= List of municipalities of the Metropolitan City of Messina =

This is a list of the 108 municipalities (comuni) of the Metropolitan City of Messina in the autonomous region of Sicily in Italy.

== List ==
Municipality	Population (2026)	Area (km²)	Density
Acquedolci	5,532	12.93	427.8
Alcara Li Fusi	1,589	62.94	25.2
Alì	596	15.94	37.4
Alì Terme	2,317	6.27	369.5
Antillo	773	43.64	17.7
Barcellona Pozzo di Gotto	39,756	59.14	672.2
Basicò	614	12.07	50.9
Brolo	5,712	7.66	745.7
Capizzi	2,707	70.17	38.6
Capo d'Orlando	13,065	14.43	905.4
Capri Leone	4,401	6.76	651.0
Caronia	2,917	227.26	12.8
Casalvecchio Siculo	675	33.62	20.1
Castel di Lucio	1,355	28.78	47.1
Castell'Umberto	2,731	11.43	238.9
Castelmola	1,071	16.83	63.6
Castroreale	2,231	53.07	42.0
Cesarò	2,060	216.93	9.5
Condrò	501	5.13	97.7
Falcone	2,826	9.34	302.6
Ficarra	1,267	18.66	67.9
Fiumedinisi	1,250	36.69	34.1
Floresta	458	31.33	14.6
Fondachelli-Fantina	1,058	42.21	25.1
Forza d'Agrò	902	11.19	80.6
Francavilla di Sicilia	3,498	82.73	42.3
Frazzanò	524	7.00	74.9
Furci Siculo	3,245	17.91	181.2
Furnari	4,246	13.55	313.4
Gaggi	3,094	7.65	404.4
Galati Mamertino	2,108	39.31	53.6
Gallodoro	320	6.91	46.3
Giardini-Naxos	9,437	5.29	1,783.9
Gioiosa Marea	6,686	26.48	252.5
Graniti	1,434	10.05	142.7
Gualtieri Sicaminò	1,508	14.38	104.9
Itala	1,491	10.98	135.8
Leni	669	8.79	76.1
Letojanni	2,979	6.72	443.3
Librizzi	1,535	23.39	65.6
Limina	703	9.99	70.4
Lipari	12,794	89.72	142.6
Longi	1,251	42.11	29.7
Malfa	1,003	8.74	114.8
Malvagna	575	6.71	85.7
Mandanici	468	11.85	39.5
Mazzarrà Sant'Andrea	1,405	6.69	210.0
Merì	2,394	1.85	1,294.1
Messina	216,458	213.75	1,012.7
Milazzo	29,779	24.70	1,205.6
Militello Rosmarino	1,168	29.54	39.5
Mirto	852	9.27	91.9
Mistretta	4,150	127.47	32.6
Mojo Alcantara	679	8.60	79.0
Monforte San Giorgio	2,390	32.26	74.1
Mongiuffi Melia	506	24.36	20.8
Montagnareale	1,342	16.38	81.9
Montalbano Elicona	2,072	67.80	30.6
Motta Camastra	762	25.31	30.1
Motta d'Affermo	646	14.58	44.3
Naso	3,344	36.74	91.0
Nizza di Sicilia	3,488	13.42	259.9
Novara di Sicilia	1,045	49.18	21.2
Oliveri	2,226	10.43	213.4
Pace del Mela	5,938	12.18	487.5
Pagliara	1,100	14.48	76.0
Patti	12,721	50.08	254.0
Pettineo	1,222	30.62	39.9
Piraino	3,724	16.97	219.4
Raccuja	839	25.20	33.3
Reitano	705	14.12	49.9
Roccafiorita	154	1.17	131.6
Roccalumera	4,143	8.91	465.0
Roccavaldina	965	7.13	135.3
Roccella Valdemone	532	41.15	12.9
Rodì Milici	1,938	36.55	53.0
Rometta	6,497	32.12	202.3
San Filippo del Mela	6,617	10.05	658.4
San Fratello	3,159	67.63	46.7
San Marco d'Alunzio	1,775	26.14	67.9
San Pier Niceto	2,518	36.68	68.6
San Piero Patti	2,535	41.82	60.6
San Salvatore di Fitalia	1,103	15.00	73.5
San Teodoro	1,185	13.97	84.8
Sant'Agata di Militello	12,133	33.98	357.1
Sant'Alessio Siculo	1,542	6.17	249.9
Sant'Angelo di Brolo	2,625	30.39	86.4
Santa Domenica Vittoria	861	20.16	42.7
Santa Lucia del Mela	4,342	85.68	50.7
Santa Marina Salina	877	8.78	99.9
Santa Teresa di Riva	9,133	8.12	1,124.8
Santo Stefano di Camastra	4,325	21.92	197.3
Saponara	3,620	26.26	137.9
Savoca	1,749	9.08	192.6
Scaletta Zanclea	1,861	4.76	391.0
Sinagra	2,418	24.03	100.6
Spadafora	4,602	10.52	437.5
Taormina	10,476	13.13	797.9
Terme Vigliatore	7,363	13.23	556.5
Torregrotta	7,283	4.13	1,763.4
Torrenova	4,483	12.93	346.7
Tortorici	5,432	70.50	77.0
Tripi	704	54.67	12.9
Tusa	2,480	41.07	60.4
Ucria	841	26.26	32.0
Valdina	1,246	2.60	479.2
Venetico	3,961	4.52	876.3
Villafranca Tirrena	7,709	14.25	541.0

== See also ==
- List of municipalities of Sicily
- List of municipalities of Italy
