= Giacomo Gagini =

Italian sculptor (1517–1598)

- Born: 15 December 1517; Palermo, Italy
- Died: 25 June 1598 (aged 80)
- Occupation: Sculptor
- Father: Antonello Gagini
- Family: Gagini family

Giacomo Gagini (also Gaggini, 15 December 1517 – 25 June 1598) was an Italian sculptor of the Gagini family.

== Biography ==
Born on 15 December 1517, in Palermo, he was the son of the sculptor Antonello Gagini, and the brother of Fazio and Vincenzo, and half-brother of Giovanni Domenico and Antonino Gagini, all sculptors.

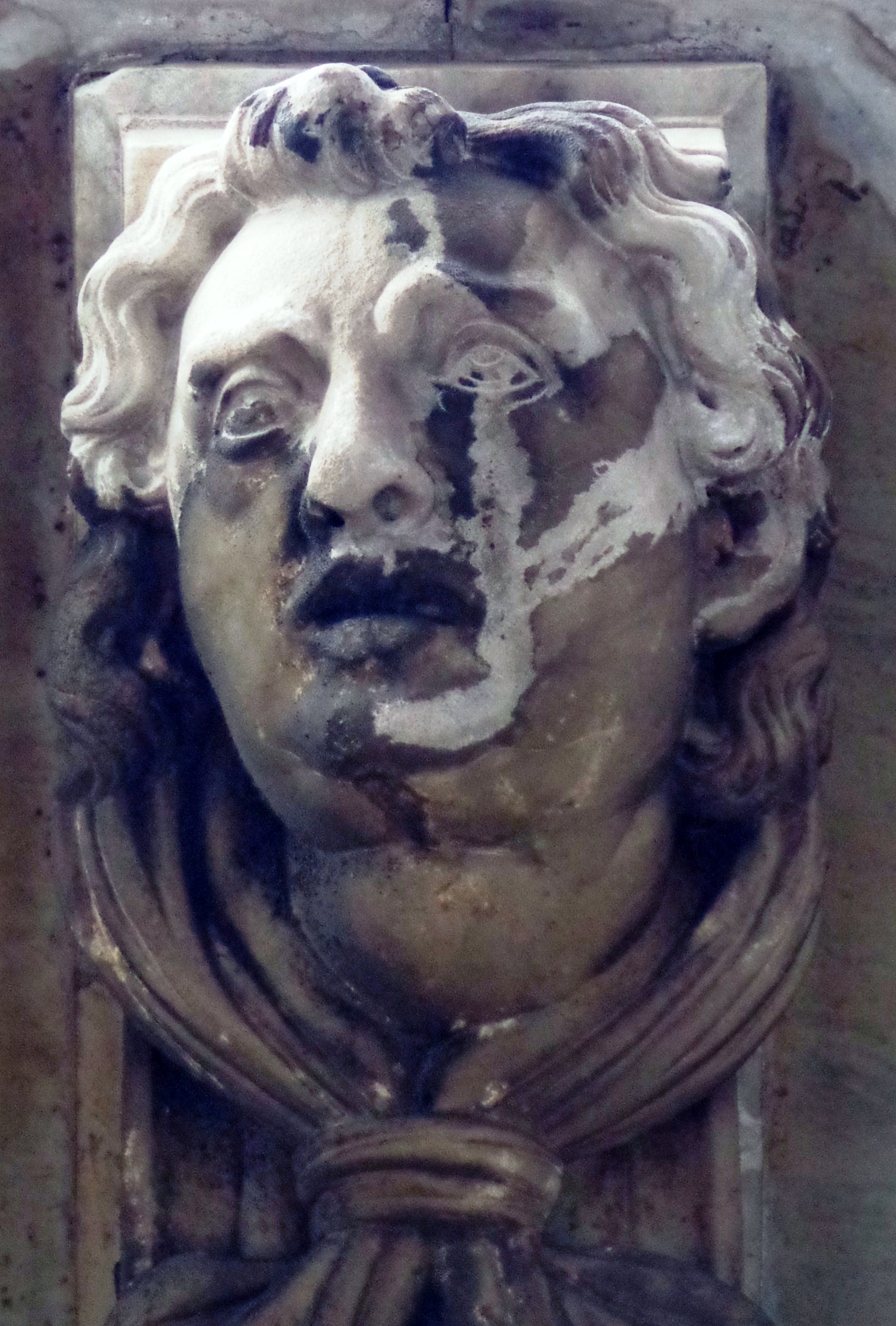
Portrait sculpture depicting Giacomo Gagini

He started to collaborate with his father at an early age, including the work at the Palermo Cathedral. In 1536, he sculpted two statues for the church of San Francesco di Paola and, in 1537, the Omodei tomb in the church of San Francesco d'Assisi. In 1544, also in the Palermo Cathedral, he sculpted the archbishop's throne, together with his brother Fazio and others. He also produced numerous works in the province of Palermo (Trapani, Alcamo, Sinagra, Naro, Pettineo).

His autographed and documented works can be found in Palermo, Ciminna, Polizzi Generosa, Caltabellotta, Naro, Sciacca, Castiglione di Sicilia, Randazzo, Calascibetta, Galati Mamertino, Longi, Messina, Mistretta, Montalbano Elicona, Roccella Valdemone, Sinagra, Tortorici, Alcamo, Erice, Marsala, and Trapani.

== Works ==
=== Agrigento and province ===
==== Caltabellotta ====
- 1535, St. Benedict and Our Lady of Consolation, marble statues, in collaboration with Father Antonello Gagini works from the church of St. Benedict, commissioned by the Confraternity of St. Benedict and since 1783 kept in the church of St. Mary of Valverde.
- 1591, Madonna of the Chain, marble statue, attribution of work kept in the cathedral basilica of Maria Santissima Assunta.

==== Naro ====
- 1534 - 1536 - 1543, Madonna of the Chain, marble statue, made in collaboration with his father Antonello Gagini, from the ancient Norman cathedral and currently housed in the cathedral of Maria Santissima Annunziata.
- 1534 - 1536 - 1543, Arch, marble artifact for the custody of the Madonna of the Chain with the depiction of St. Agatha with seraphim, the Trinity, a work in collaboration with his father Antonello Gagini documented in the old Norman cathedral.

== Sources ==
- Spiriti, Andrea (December 2008). "I Gaggini. Una stirpe di artisti bissonesi". In Giorgio Mollisi (ed.). Bissone terra di artisti. Ticino Management. p. 42.
