= Leo of Catania =

Catholic saint and 15th bishop of Catania

Saint Leo
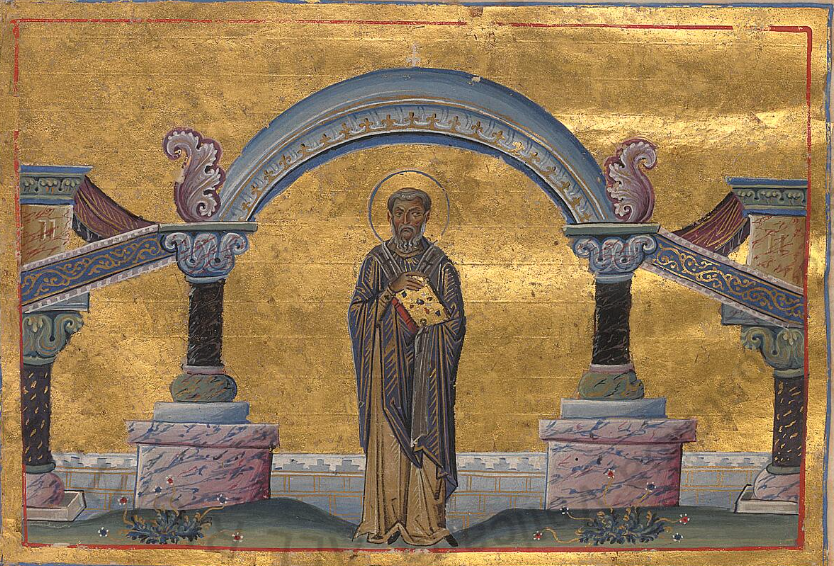
- Icon of Saint Leo of Catania, Menologion of Basil II

Bishop of Catania Confessor Wonderworker
- Born: c. 703 or 709; Ravenna, Exarchate of Ravenna
- Died: 789; Catania, Theme of Sicily
- Venerated in: Roman Catholic Church; Eastern Orthodox Church; Anglican communion Lutheranism
- Feast: February 20

Saint Leo of Catania, also known as the Thaumaturgus, or St Leo the Wonderworker in Sicily (May 703 or 709 – 20 February 789), was the fifteenth bishop of Catania, famed also for his love and care toward the poor. His feast day occurs on 20 February, the day of his death, when he is venerated as a saint by both Roman Catholics and the Orthodox Church. He lived in the hiatus between the reigns of the Emperors Justinian II and Constantine VI (the unpopular Justinian was killed in 711, and his six-year-old son Tiberius was murdered shortly thereafter. It was not to be until 790 that Constantine reached maturity, to assume sole reign).

Leo battled especially against paganism and sorcery, still troubling Byzantine Sicily in those days.

He left a reputation for prodigious and charitable deeds, earning the Greek epithet (Thaumaturgus translates literally as worker of miracles). For the people of Catania he was simply Leone "il Maraviglioso". He is the patron saint of the Sicilian localities of Rometta, Longi and Sinagra. The hamlet of Saracena in Calabria celebrates him twice a year, in spring and in late summer.

== Life ==
Leo was born at Ravenna, then part of the Byzantine empire. At a young age he became a Benedictine monk, and moved to Reggio Calabria in Southern Italy. There the local bishop Cyril nominated him archdeacon. He remained in Calabria until elected as bishop to the vacant Archidiocese of Catania, almost 300 km (190 mi) away.

Local legend has it that the Catanians, needing a new bishop, dreamt collectively that an angel pointed them to the Calabrian city of Reggio, where a man in the odour of sanctity was to be found in a hermitage. Proving initially reluctant, Leo had considered himself unworthy, and had politely refused. Eventually he must have been won over: regardless of the historic worth of this attractive tale, Leo did indeed come to be appointed to serve Catania's Christians in 765.

There then began the Byzantine Iconoclasm, a fierce and ruthless destruction of sacred images and icons throughout the Byzantine Empire (of which Catania and all of Sicily was part). Leo was quite bold in his opposition. The Byzantine governor of Sicily ordered his arrest, forcing him to leave Catania and find refuge on the Tyrrhenian side of the island. For many years he wandered in the woody Nebrodian heights, between Longi and Sinagra. It seems he was afforded refuge by people acknowledging a stout bulwark against imperial abuse. Endless roving eventually brought him to Rometta. Here, on Monti Peloritani backing Messina, he settled in a cave he had hollowed out with hands and fingernails. When the risk of incarceration waned, he returned to Catania to reclaim his bishopric. With renewed vigour, he maintained defiance of the iconoclast edict, and combatted heresy that had taken root in his diocese. He died in Catania on 20 February 789.

== A Catanian legend: the Thaumaturge and the Charmer ==
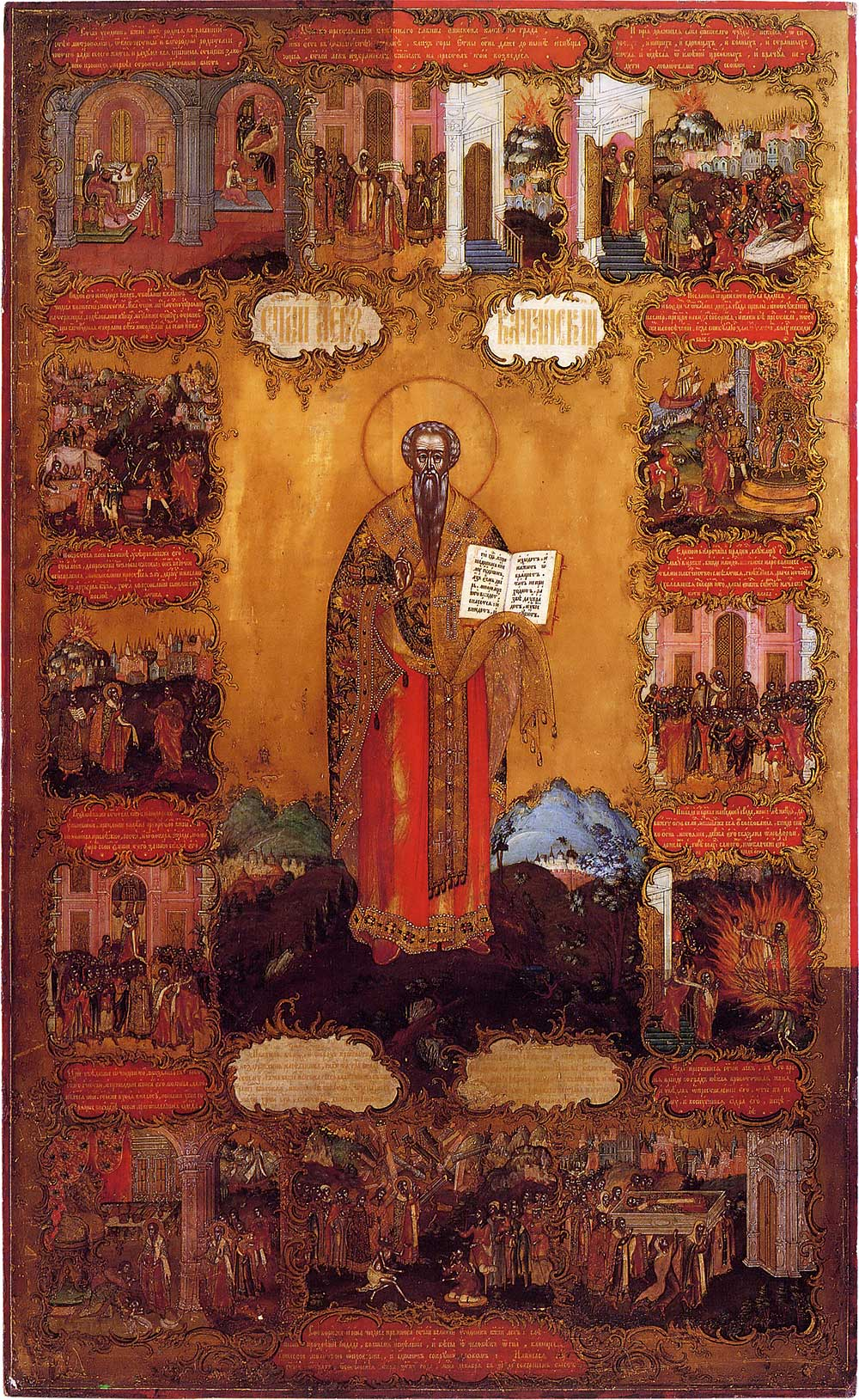
Russian Vita icon

According to a local tale, a Catanian dignitary of noble birth called Heliodorus had been one of the unsuccessful candidates for the episcopate. Perhaps identified as inexplicable and capricious, the choice of Leo, a man from faraway, had seeded envy and rage. Heliodorus disavowed the Christian faith, nursing a grudge towards the foreign-born incumbent and his fellow-citizens.

He took to magic and the occult, so as to fascinate spectators, lead them astray and acquire a following. For his part, Leo is said to have repeatedly tried in vain by peaceful means to persuade Heliodorus away from such devilish work. One Sunday in 778, so the story continues, Leo was officiating at Mass in Catania's main church. It is said that Heliodorus burst in noisily, and advanced along the pews seeking to bewitch the congregation. Leo was obliged to halt the liturgy and deal with the disturbance. He left the altar and forced his way through the congregation to come face to face with Heliodorus. He challenged him to demonstrate openly who was in the right.

The scene in this legend now shifts to the nearby Achillean Thermal Baths, where the Catania Cathedral now stands. After ordering that wood be heaped up on a fire inside, Leo is alleged to have suddenly wrapped his Omophorion (bishop's vestment) round Heliodorus and dragged him towards it. Both were engulfed in high flames, transforming their silhouettes and rendering their clothes to embers. Only Leo survived. His body unscathed, he is said to have emerged with vestments now seeming intact and shining. All that remained of what had transpired was smoking and smouldering ashes.

== Sources ==
- Santi Correnti. La città semprerifiorente. Catania, Greco, 1977.
