= Castell'Umberto =

- Comune
- Comune di Castell'Umberto
- Coat of arms

- Location within Italy Location within Sicily
- Coordinates: 38°5′N 14°48′E
- Country: Italy
- Region: Sicily
- Metropolitan city: Messina (ME)
- Frazioni: Sfaranda, San Giorgio, Vecchio Centro, Baracche, Drià.

Government
  - Mayor: Vincenzo Lionetto Civa

Area
  - Total: 11.43 km^{2} (4.41 sq mi)
- Elevation: 660 m (2,170 ft)

Population (30 November 2021)
  - Total: 2,845
  - Density: 248.9/km^{2} (644.7/sq mi)
- Demonym: Umbertini
- Time zone: UTC+1 (CET)
  - Summer (DST): UTC+2 (CEST)
- Postal code: 98070
- Dialing code: 0941
- Website: Official website

Castell'Umberto (Sicilian: Castedd'Umbertu) is a comune (municipality) in the Metropolitan City of Messina in the Italian region Sicily, located about 130 kilometres (81 mi) east of Palermo and about 70 kilometres (43 mi) west of Messina.

Castell'Umberto borders the following municipalities: Naso, San Salvatore di Fitalia, Sinagra, Tortorici, Ucria. The local economy is based on the extraction and working of stone

== People ==
- Nick Catania (born 1945)
