= Artale =

Artale is an Italian surname. Notable people with the surname include:

- Enrico Maria Artale, Italian filmmaker
- Giacinto Artale, Italian politician
- Giuseppe Artale, Italian writer
- Vito Artale, Italian general

== See also ==
- Artale II Alagona
