= San Francesco, Tortorici =

Church building in Italy

Coordinates: 38.02827°N 14.82421°E

San Francesco is a Roman Catholic church and convent located in the town of Tortorici, province of Messina, region of Sicily, Italy. The church was named a national monument. It stands diagonally across from the parish church of Santa Maria Assunta.

== History ==
The church was rebuilt in 1602 at this site by the Franciscan order of Frati Minori. A prior church called Santa Maria extra moenia (outside the walls) had been destroyed by a recent flood. Materials for the present church were re-used from the prior church, including the facade central portal. This was sculpted in 1432 by Gaspar de Ismiriglia. Over the doorway is the Franciscan symbol of the crossed arms. The lateral facade portals date to 1686. The portal leading to the gardens, formerly the monastic cloister, dates from the Norman era, was also derived from the destroyed church.

The belltower was built in the 17th century, and had a clock added in the early 1700s. The convent remained in Franciscan hands until 1866, when it was shuttered by order of the central government. The interior has a central nave and two lateral aisles and has parallel columns with gothic arches. The main altar was built in 1689. The altar on the right side has a wooden icon of St Paul sculpted in 1658 by Sebastiano Leone and gilded by Giuseppe di Giovanni. In the left altar is a marble statuary group depicting St Francis and Brother Leone, commissioned in 1535 from Antonello Gagini. On the left is a 17th-century crucifix by the Frate Umile di Petralia. In the right nave is the processional icon, il fercolo, depicting the patron saint of the town: St Sebastian. Sebastian replaced St Catald, whose statue is also in the church. The ceiling is carved with depictions of St Antonino, St Francis, and the Immaculate Conception carved by Giuseppe Tomasi in 1600.
