= Domenico Gagini =

Italian sculptor

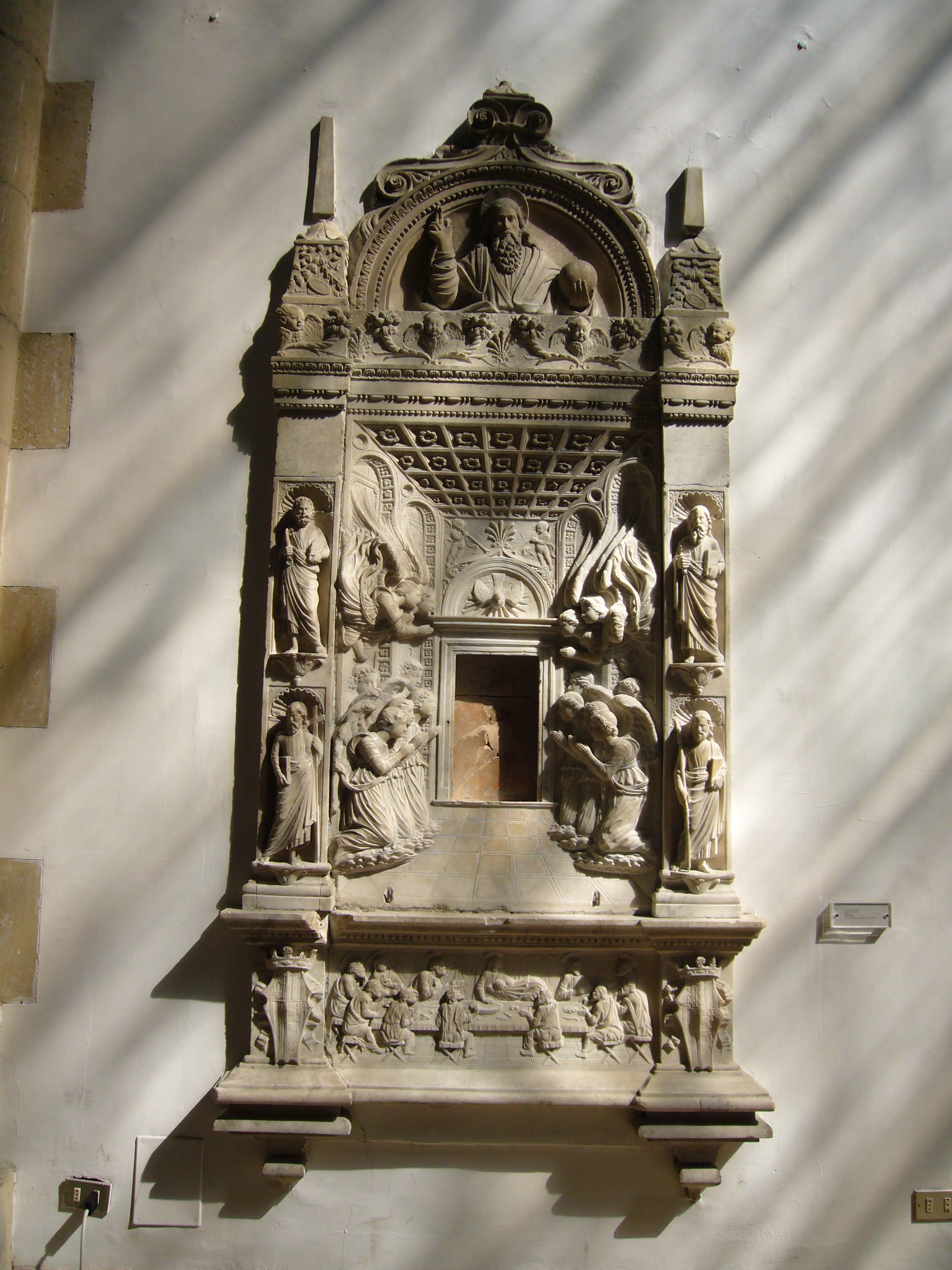
tabernacle in the Cappella palatina in Castel Nuovo in Naples

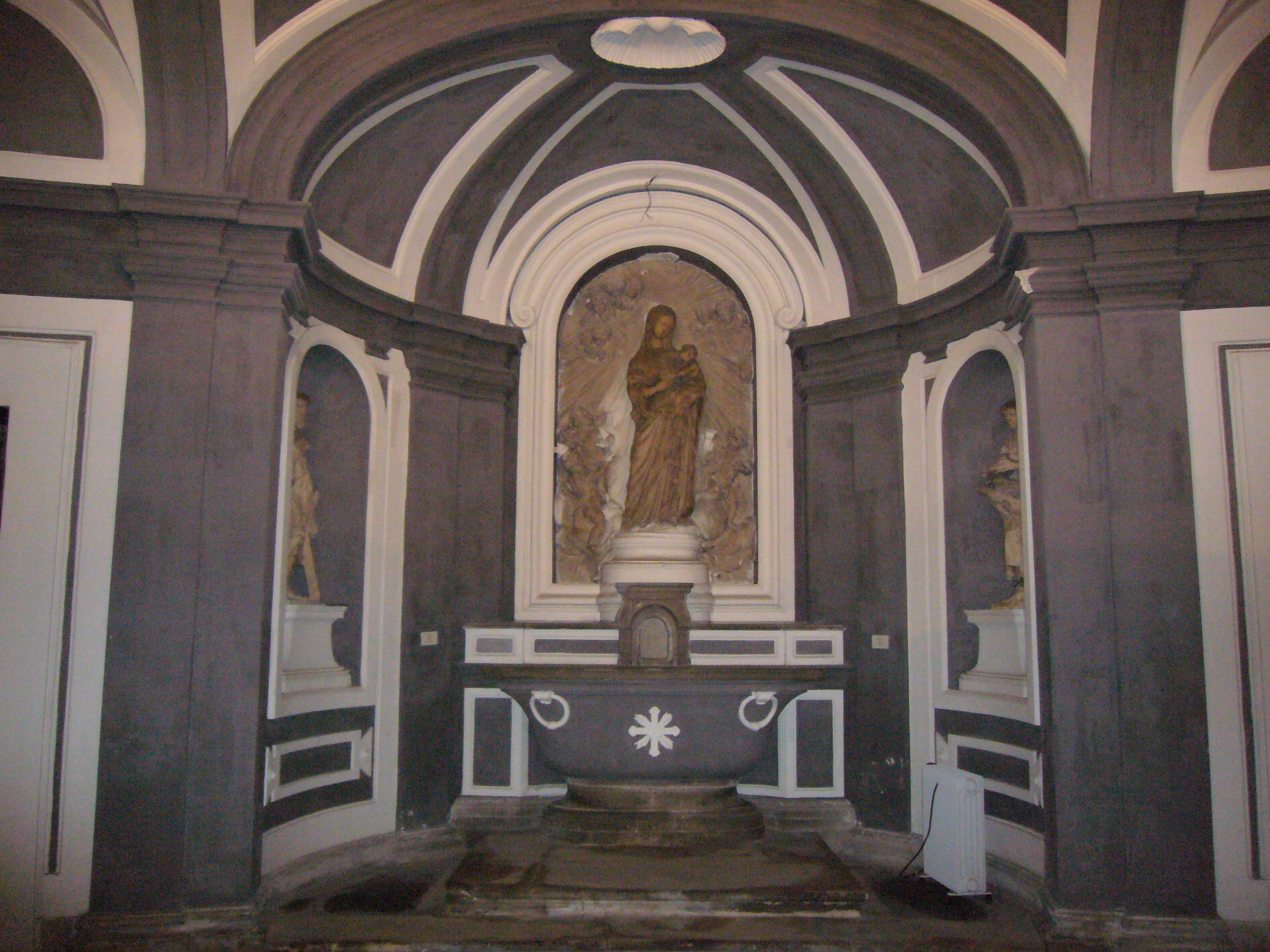
Altar with the Madonna and Child in the Basilica dell'Annunziata in Naples

Domenico Gagini (c. 1425 or 1430 in Bissone – 29 or 30 September 1492 in Palermo) was a Swiss-Italian sculptor who was active in Northern as well as Southern Italy.

== Life ==
He was the son of Pietro Gagini. The Gagini were a family of sculptors and painters working during the Middle Ages and Renaissance. First recorded in Genoa in the early 15th century, was Domenico's grandfather Beltrame Gagini, and his three sons Pietro, Giovanni and Pace.

Domenico Gagini was the first sculptor of this family to achieve international fame. Born at Bissone, in the Ticino (now part of Switzerland) he studied in Florence under Brunelleschi. Returning to Genoa in 1447 he worked on the sculpture of the dome of the church of S. Giovanni Battista. In 1457 he was recorded as working in Naples for Alfonso of Aragon. In 1463 he arrived in Palermo, Sicily where he, and later his family including Giovanni Gagini and Antonello, influenced the decorative architecture of the island, in works of both decorative and figure sculpture.

One of Domenico Gagini's most notable works is the decoration of the choir in Palermo Cathedral, which consists of a combination of life-size figures within relief panels, plus a large number of small free-standing figures.

Gagini died in Palermo in 1492.
