= Francesco Cupani =

Italian botanist (1657–1710)

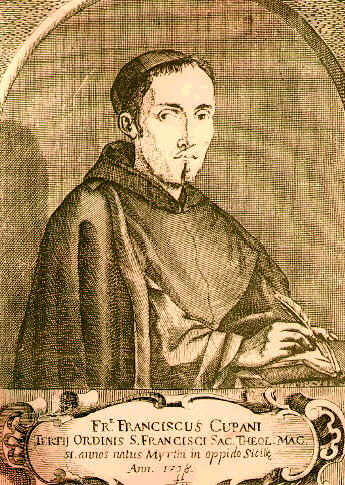
- Francesco Cupani
- Born: 21 January 1657; Mirto, Kingdom of Sicily
- Died: 19 January 1710 (aged 52); Palermo, Kingdom of Sicily
- Known for: Discovering and first cultivating the wild sweet pea
- Scientific career
- Fields: Natural history; Botany

Francesco Cupani (21 January 1657, Mirto – 19 January 1710, Palermo) was an Italian Franciscan friar and naturalist mainly interested in botany. In 1692, he became the first director of the botanic garden in Misilmeri, where he classified plants using an early system of binomial nomenclature.

== Biography ==
Born in Mirto, Sicily, on 21 January 1657, Cupani first studied medicine before entering the Franciscan at the age of 24, on 22 May 1681. After earning his doctorates in philosophy and theology, he was assigned to teach at the order's colleges in Verona and Palermo. Cupani befriended his fellow Franciscan, the naturalist Paolo Boccone, who introduced him to botanical studies. Cupani developed a classification system based on the characteristics of the inflorescence. In his in-depth study of Sicilian flora, he paid particular attention to fruit-bearing tree varieties, especially the almond tree. The results of this research were published in two works: Catalogus plantarum Sicularum noviter inventarum (1692) and Syllabus plantarum Siciliae nuper detectarum (1694).

Cupani found an effective patron in Giuseppe del Bosco, Prince of Cattolica, who financed the creation of a botanical garden in Misilmeri, near Palermo. Boccone, Pietro Citraro and Francesco Scaglione collaborated on its creation. To collect plant specimens, Cupani travelled extensively throughout Sicily, and established contact with several European botanists, including Joseph Pitton de Tournefort, Caspar Commelijn, William Sherard, James Petiver. Among his Italian contacts were Felice Viali (1638–1722), prefect of the botanical garden in Padua, and Giovanni Battista Trionfetti (1656–1708), prefect of the botanical garden in Rome. Cupani compiled a catalogue of the Misilmeri botanical garden which was published in Naples in 1696 under the title Hortus Catholicus; the work is supplemented by two additions, the first printed alongside the Hortus itself and the second printed in Palermo in 1697. Cupani is credited with discovering and first cultivating the wild sweet pea (Lathyrus odoratus). In 1699, he sent seeds of the plant to the English schoolmaster and horticulturist Robert Uvedale. This shipment marked the first recorded introduction of the sweet pea to gardens outside of Sicily. Cupani sent seeds also to Oxford botanist Jacob Bobart, and the Dutch botanist Jan Commelin who published a description and illustration of sweet peas in Amsterdam. A variety of sweet pea, the Lathyrus odoratus Cupani, is named for hm.

Illustration from Cupani's Panphyton Siculum, 1713

Cupani died in Mirto on 19 January 1710. His main work, Panphyton Siculum, was published posthumously in Palermo in 1713. This three-volume work contains nearly 700 plates and 1500 figures of Sicilian plants, insects, and birds. The author had not intended these to form a standalone work, but rather for them to serve as illustrations for a comprehensive Natural History of Sicily, which would cover the fields of zoology, botany and mineralogy. Fragments of this unpublished text can be found in the Biblioteca centrale della Regione Siciliana in Palermo.

== Works ==
- Catalogus plantarum sicularum Noviter adinventarum, Palermo, 1692.
- Syllabus plantarum Siciliae Nuper detectarum, Palermo, 1694.
- Hortus Catholicus, Naples, 1696.
- Panphyton Siculum, a natural history (fauna as well as flora) of Sicily published posthumously in 1713 and the result of 25 years work.

== Bibliography ==
- Colombero, Carlo (1985). "CUPANI, Francesco". Dizionario Biografico degli Italiani (in Italian). Vol. 31: Cristaldi–Dalla Nave. Rome: Institute of the Italian Encyclopaedia. ISBN 978-88-12-00032-6.
- Pulvirenti, Santa; Indriolo, Maria Martina; Pavone, Pietro; Costa, Rosanna Maria Stefania (2015). "Study of a pre-Linnaean herbarium attributed to Francesco Cupani (1657-1710)". Candollea. 70 (1): 67–99. doi:10.15553/c2015v701a8. ISSN 0373-2967.
- Blackhall-Miles, Robbie (24 November 2015). "Sweet peas: wild at heart". The Guardian.
