= Mirto, Sicily =

Comune in Sicily, Italy

Mirto Mirtu (Sicilian) Mirtià (Greek)
- Comune
- Comune di Mirto
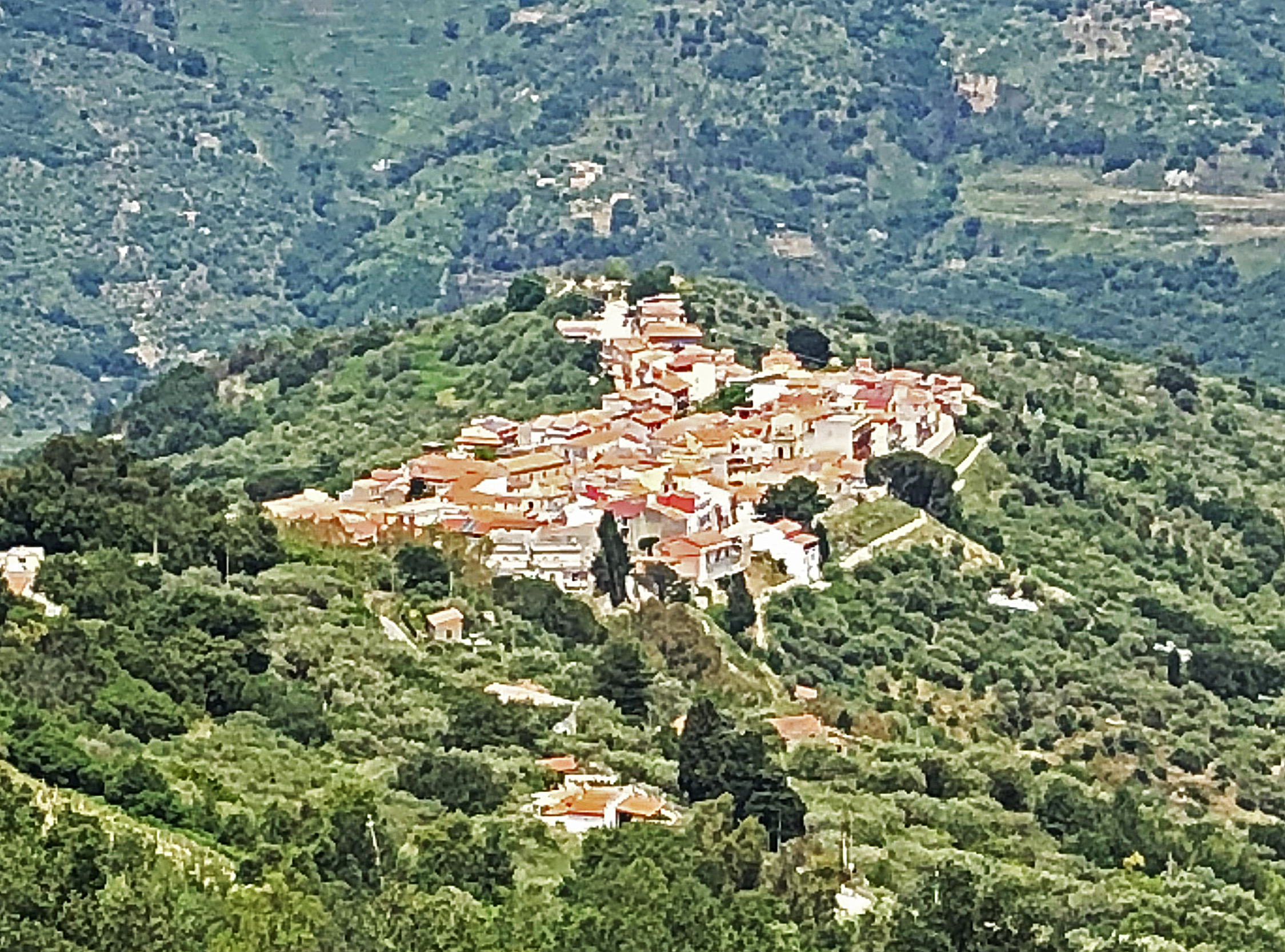
- Mirto Skyline

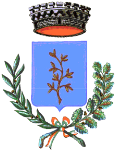
- Coat of arms

- The comune of Mirto within the metropolitan city of Messina

- Location within Sicily Location within Italy
- Coordinates: 38°5′N 14°45′E
- Country: Italy
- Region: Sicily
- Metropolitan city: Messina (ME)

Government
  - Mayor: Maurizio Zingales

Area
  - Total: 9.27 km^{2} (3.58 sq mi)
- Elevation: 428 m (1,404 ft)

Population (31 August 2020)
  - Total: 922
  - Density: 99.5/km^{2} (258/sq mi)
- Demonym: Mirtesi
- Time zone: UTC+1 (CET)
  - Summer (DST): UTC+2 (CEST)
- Postal code: 98070
- Dialing code: 0941
- ISTAT code: 083051
- Patron saint: Thecla
- Saint day: 24 September
- Website: Official website

Mirto (Sicilian: Mirtu) is a comune (municipality) in the Metropolitan City of Messina in the Italian region Sicily, located about 120 kilometres (75 mi) east of Palermo and about 70 kilometres (43 mi) west of Messina.

Mirto borders the following municipalities: Capo d'Orlando, Capri Leone, Frazzanò, Naso, San Salvatore di Fitalia.

== People ==
- Francesco Cupani (1657–1710)
