= Alcara li Fusi =

- Comune
- Comune di Alcara li Fusi
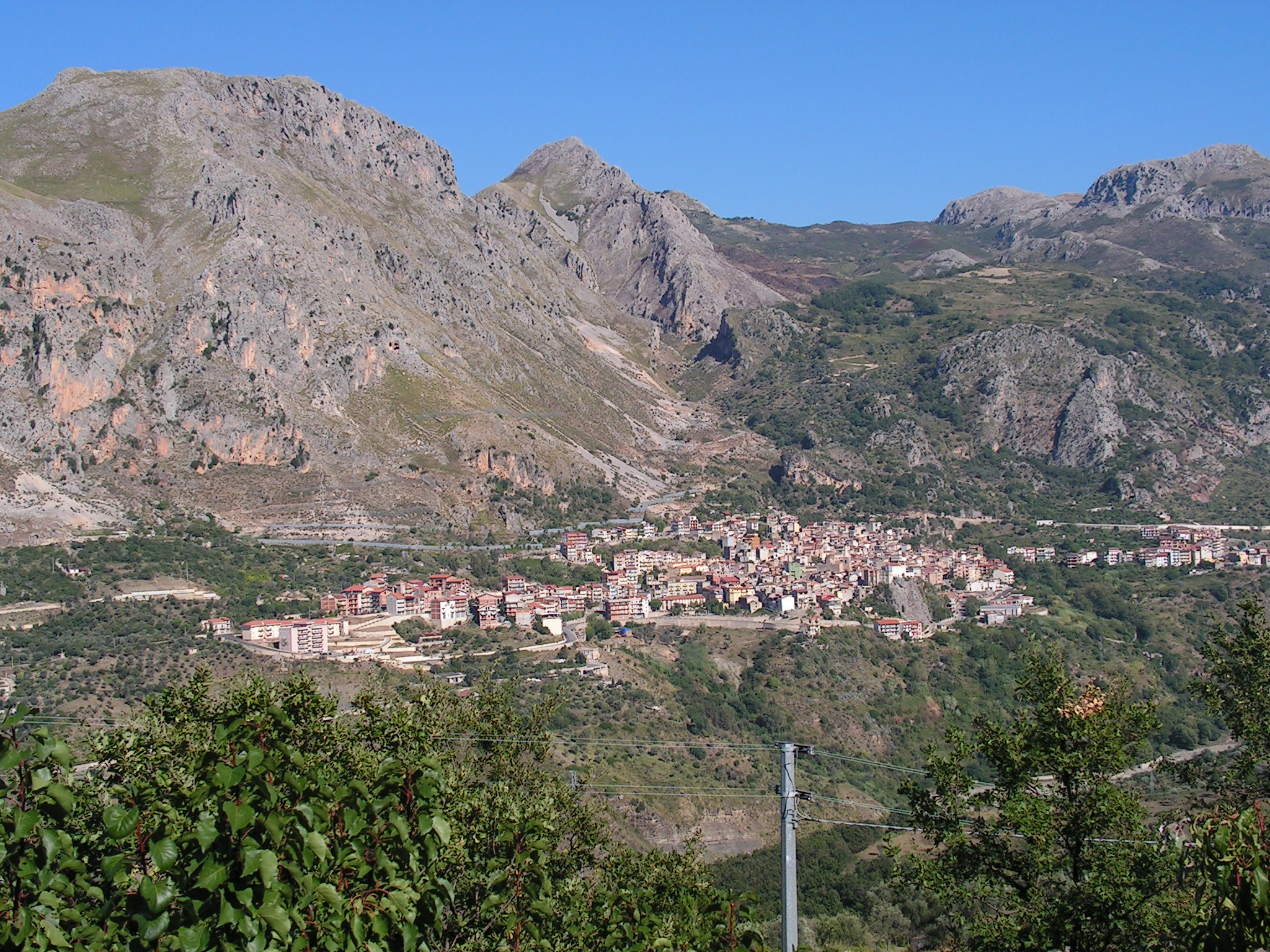

- Location of Alcara li Fusi in Italy Alcara li Fusi (Sicily)
- Coordinates: 38°1′N 14°42′E
- Country: Italy
- Region: Sicily
- Metropolitan city: Messina (ME)

Government
  - Mayor: Ettore Dottore

Area
  - Total: 62.94 km^{2} (24.30 sq mi)
- Elevation: 400 m (1,300 ft)

Population (31 December 2021)
  - Total: 1,731
  - Density: 27.50/km^{2} (71.23/sq mi)
- Demonym: Alcaresi
- Time zone: UTC+1 (CET)
  - Summer (DST): UTC+2 (CEST)
- Postal code: 98070
- Dialing code: 0941
- Website: www.comune.alcaralifusi.me.it

Alcara li Fusi is a comune (municipality) in the Metropolitan City of Messina in the Italian region Sicily, located about 120 kilometres (75 mi) east of Palermo and about 80 kilometres (50 mi) west of Messina.

Alcara li Fusi borders the following municipalities: Cesarò, Longi, Militello Rosmarino, San Fratello, San Marco d'Alunzio.

== Geography ==
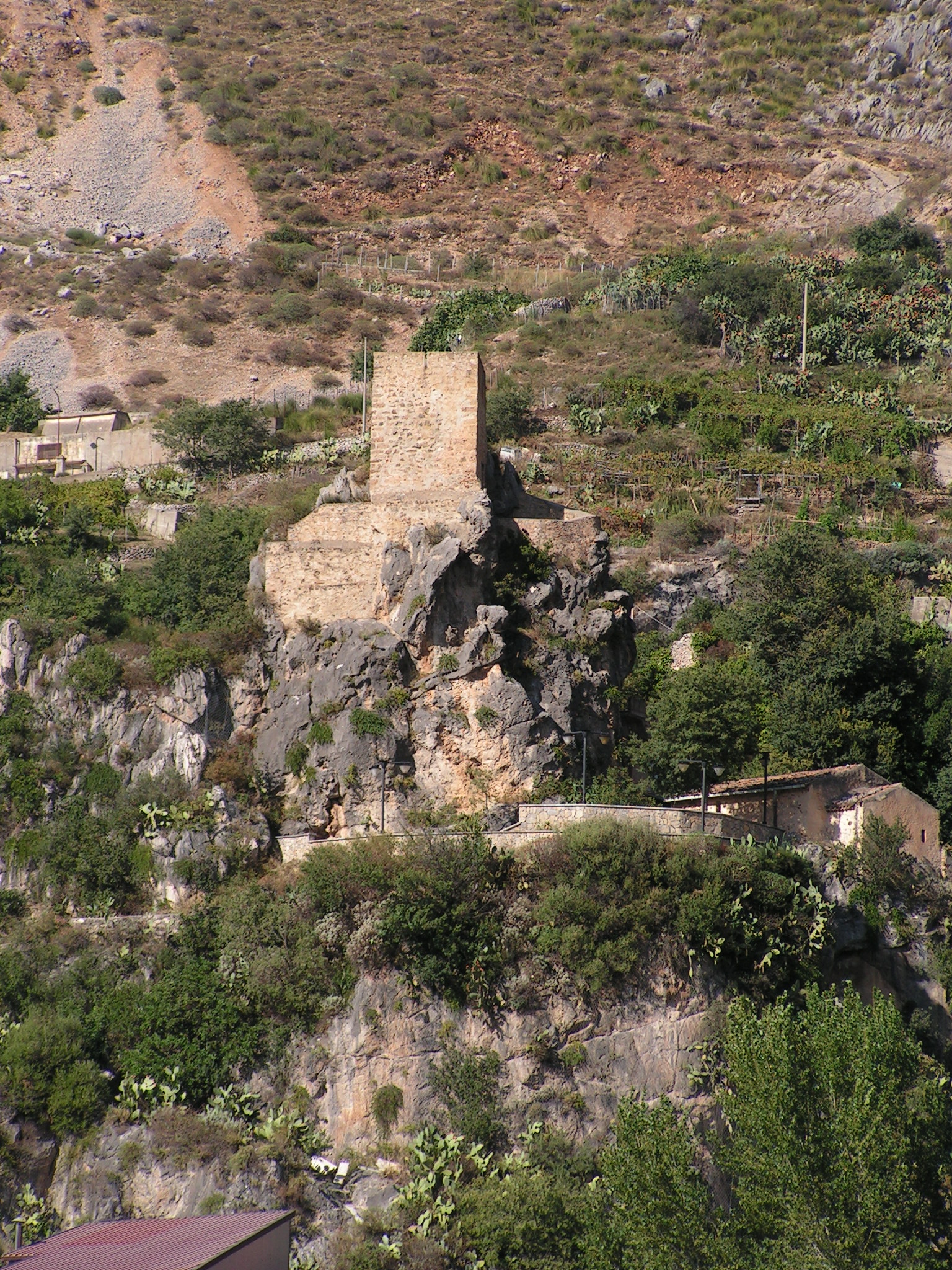
View o the Castello Turiano.

The village is 398 metres (1,306 ft) above sea level on the slopes of the Nebrodi Mountains. They extend from the peaks of Mount Crasto, which lies to the northeast at about 1,300 metres (4,300 ft) above sea level, to the plateau of Miraglia and Mount Soro, which rises to 1,847 metres (6,060 ft).

The territory is rich in watercourses; in particular is the course of the river Rosmarino, a river which has shaped a profound valley which divides into two distinct and different parts the village territory. The central habitation is found on the bank to the right of the river below magnificent rocky outcrops of calcareous origin. The left side of the Rosmarino is instead constituted by reliefs rich in vegetation which reach the ridge of the Nebrodi Mountains and the summit of Mount Soro.

== History ==
One alleged legend, reported by historical scholars in past centuries but without any references on the popular tradition, narrates about the foundation of the village by Patrone, a Greek from the city of Turio in Magna Graecia following Aeneas, who had reached the coast after having landed with some companions. In reality there is no historical evidence which can link Alcara with Turio or rather identify Alcara with the Greco-Roman city of Turiano documented on fountains in the village, besides the denomination of the "Castle Turio," the remains of a fortification which dominates the village. Equally without any historical evidence is the identification of Alcara with the greco-Byzantine city of Demenna which in any case could reasonably be localized in the area of the Nebrodi, including the area between San Marco d'Alunzio, Alcara, and Longi. Controversial also is the locality of the greco-sicanian city of Crasto (Krastos) which according to various local historians fluctuates from Western Sicily, Southern Sicily, and Eastern Sicily, but that should not deviate too much from the area between Agrigento and Imera, despite the presence of rocky outcrops of "Crasto" just above the habitation of Alcara.

According to local oral history, which takes as its source scholars of the 16th, 17th, and 18th centuries, the habitation would have its origin following the destruction by the Saracens of Crasto and Démena in 855. Following this, a part of the inhabitants transferred to an area more within the valley. The same version of the story is given, moving a little the position of the mythical cities, even for other centers within the Nebrodi Mountain region (for example for Demenna).

The improbability of the identification with Krastos and the controversial localization of Demenna, does not exclude that the actual habitation was born by the progressive abandonment of the settlement located more towards the mountain which is a common phenomenon in Apennine regions. To this conclusion could be brought for example the remains of human settlement present until a few years, even at Crasto.

=== The Middle Ages ===
The settlement probably took the Arab name of Akaret (meaning fortress) during the Islamic domination in Sicily. It does not seem improbable that the Arabs after the difficult conquest of this area of the Nebrodi (one of the last conquests, after almost a century after their landing on the island) had called for a network of fortifications for control of the territory.

Nevertheless, the first real historic reference of the existence of Alcara is from a document from 1096, a certificate from Count Roger, written in Greek, which indicated Alcara as a possession of the bishop of Messina.

The oldest quarter of the village, rising at the foot of the Turio Castle (nowadays a tower on top of a rocky spur, poorly rebuilt recently on a preexisting ruin) took the name of Motta in this period, referring to the typical model of Norman fortifications which included a tower surrounded by a wall, named "motte". It is therefore probable that to give an urban structure to a settlement perhaps having had a spread out character, was the Norman period. However, it does not seem possible, at the moment, to determine the structure of the walls of the "Motta"of which there are only small tracts.

In 1359, under the reign of Frederick IV of Sicily, the fortification and its property were assigned to Vinciguerra d'Aragona.

=== Modern Era ===
The name of the village became "Alcara Valdemone", due to its belonging to the administrative subdivision of Val Demone, even though it was documented in time different versions of the name such as "L'Arcara", "Arcara", and "L'Arcara".

In the 15th century is attested a Jewish community, probably older and particularly consistent in this area of the Nebrodi, confirming that Alcara was a commercial and economic center. The community would have disappeared by the 17th century with the expulsion of all Jews from Sicily not converted.

In 1812, with the abolition of the constituencies which had up till then divided Sicily (Val di Noto, Val di Mazara, and Val Demone), it took the name of Alcara "Li Fusi" since it was a center of production of spindles used for spinning (weaving). There are attested in the eighteen hundreds different variants such as "Alcare de fusa", "Alcara dei fusi", "Alcara de li fusi", and Alcara delle Fusa". Such denominations were due to the necessity of distinguishing this inhabited center from another "Alcara" or "L'Alcara" which for the same reason took the name of Lercara Friddi.

On 17 May 1860, at Alcara there was a peasant revolt which anticipated a similar and more famous one at Bronte (and others which happened in various centers of northeastern Sicily, such as at Caronia and Francavilla). Laborers, enraged by desperate living conditions, feeding upon expectations of a ransom and social justice in the wake of the news of the imminent arrival of Giuseppe Garibaldi and his troops, assaulted the "Casa of the nobles" slaughtering with scythes and knives many people, among whom a child. The Garibaldi group, after they came upon the village, jailed a few of the rioters, who after a quick process were executed. This episode is at the center of the masterpiece of the writer Vincenzo Consolo, Il sorriso dell'ignoto marinaio.
