= Sinagra, Sicily =

Sinagra
- Comune
- Comune di Sinagra
- Location within Italy Location within Sicily
- Coordinates: 38°5′N 14°51′E
- Country: Italy
- Region: Sicily
- Metropolitan city: Messina (ME)
- Frazioni: Martini, Limari

Government
  - Mayor: Antonino Musca

Area
  - Total: 23.9 km^{2} (9.2 sq mi)
- Elevation: 260 m (850 ft)

Population (31 December 2014)
  - Total: 2,722
  - Density: 114/km^{2} (295/sq mi)
- Demonym: Sinagresi
- Time zone: UTC+1 (CET)
  - Summer (DST): UTC+2 (CEST)
- Postal code: 98069
- Dialing code: 0941
- Website: Official website

Sinagra is a comune (municipality) in the Metropolitan City of Messina in the Italian region Sicily, located about 130 kilometres (81 mi) east of Palermo and about 60 kilometres (37 mi) west of Messina.

Sinagra borders the following municipalities: Castell'Umberto, Ficarra, Naso, Raccuja, Sant'Angelo di Brolo, Tortorici, Ucria.

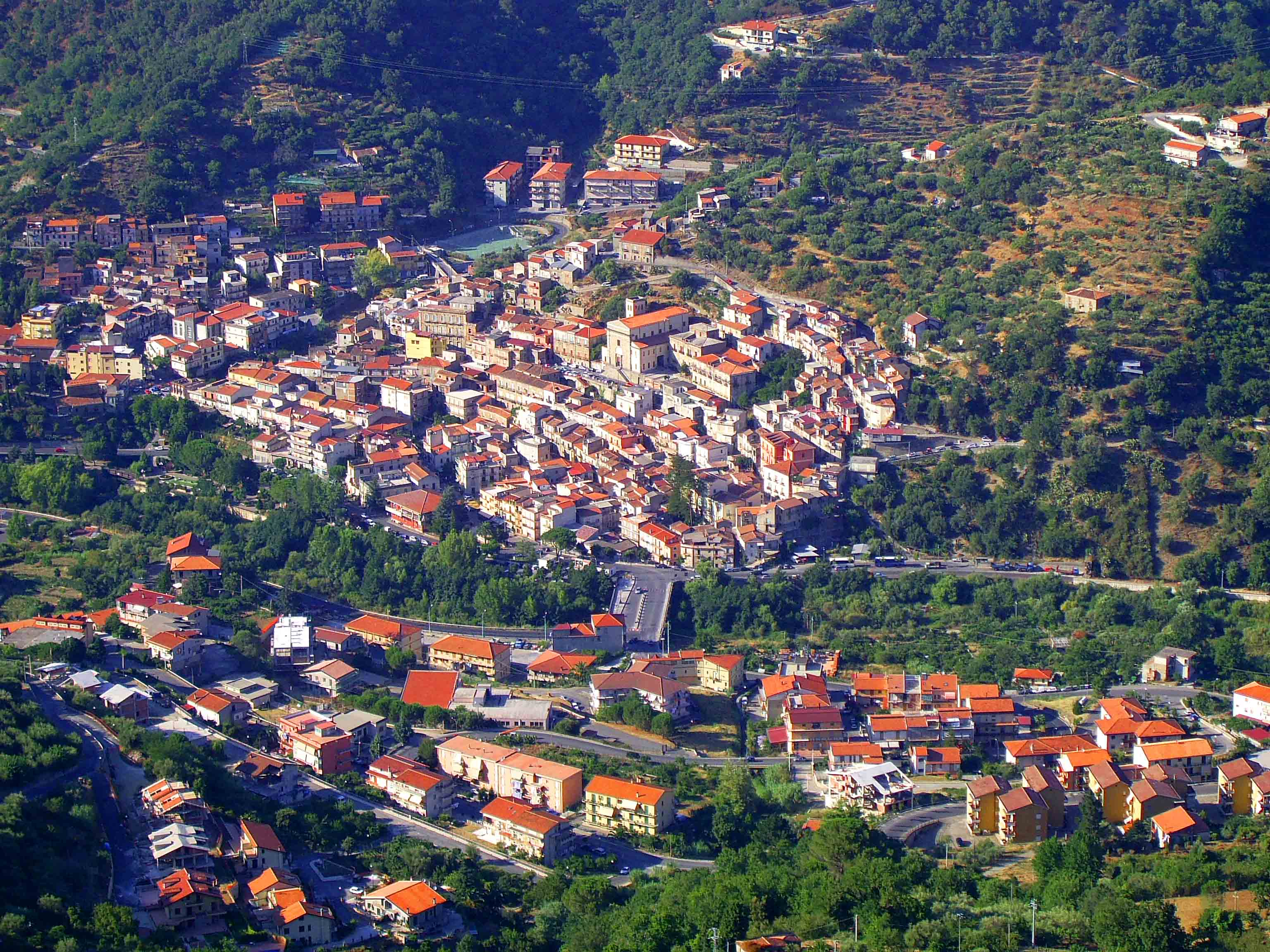
