= San Salvatore di Fitalia =

- Comune
- Comune di San Salvatore di Fitalia
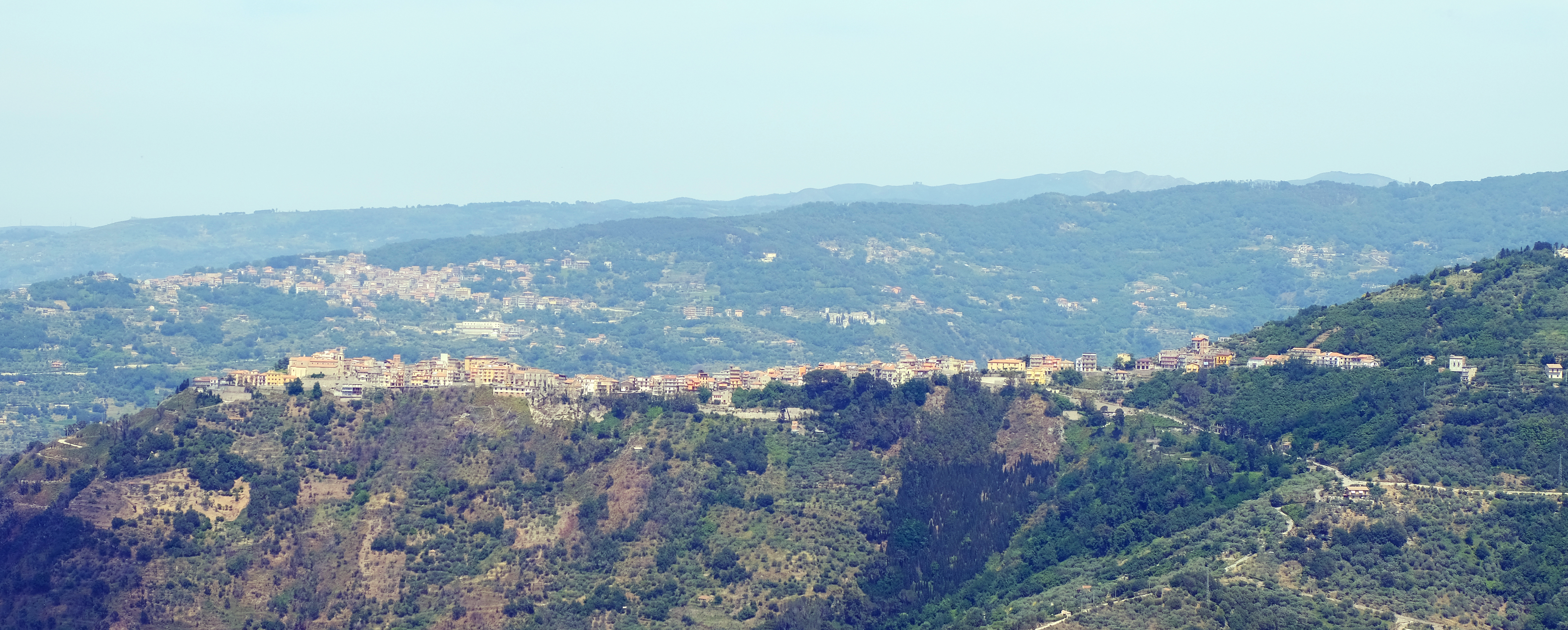

- Coat of arms

- Location within Italy Location within Sicily
- Coordinates: 38°4′N 14°47′E
- Country: Italy
- Region: Sicily
- Metropolitan city: Messina (ME)
- Frazioni: Bufana, Dovera, Grazia, Mallina, Pagliazzo, San Biagio, Sant'Adriano, Santa Lucia, Sant'Antonio, Scrisera

Government
  - Mayor: Giuseppe Pizzolante

Area
  - Total: 15 km^{2} (5.8 sq mi)
- Elevation: 603 m (1,978 ft)

Population (30 November 2021)
  - Total: 1,150
  - Density: 77/km^{2} (200/sq mi)
- Demonym: Fitalesi
- Time zone: UTC+1 (CET)
  - Summer (DST): UTC+2 (CEST)
- Postal code: 98070
- Dialing code: 0941
- Website: Official website

San Salvatore di Fitalia (Sicilian: Santu Sarvaturi di Fitalia) is a comune (municipality) in the Province of Messina in the Italian region of Sicily, located about 120 kilometres (75 mi) east of Palermo and about 70 kilometres (43 mi) west of Messina.

San Salvatore di Fitalia borders the following municipalities: Castell'Umberto, Frazzanò, Galati Mamertino, Mirto, Naso, Tortorici.

Annually is held in the city the festival of San Calogero
