= Militello Rosmarino =

- Comune
- Comune di Militello Rosmarino
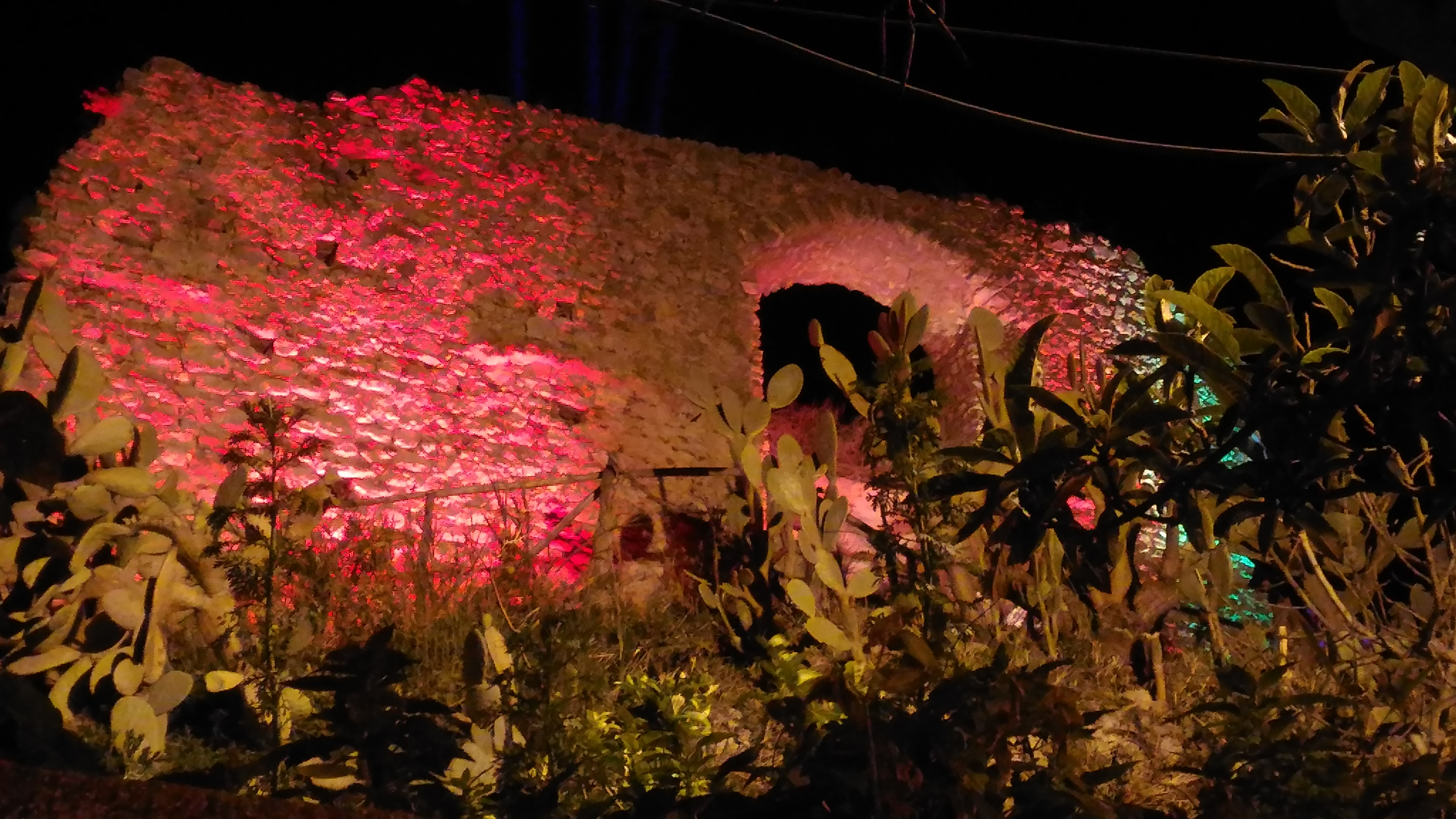

- Location within Italy Location within Sicily
- Coordinates: 38°3′N 14°41′E
- Country: Italy
- Region: Sicily
- Metropolitan city: Messina (ME)
- Frazioni: Ferretta, San Piero, San Leonardo, San Giorgio, Pigasi, Scurzi, Bulimi, Lazzarotto, Santa Maria

Government
  - Mayor: Salvatore Riotta

Area
  - Total: 29.54 km^{2} (11.41 sq mi)
- Elevation: 450 m (1,480 ft)

Population (30 November 2021)
  - Total: 1,173
  - Density: 39.71/km^{2} (102.8/sq mi)
- Demonym: Militellesi or Militellani
- Time zone: UTC+1 (CET)
  - Summer (DST): UTC+2 (CEST)
- Postal code: 98070
- Dialing code: 0941
- Website: Official website

Militello Rosmarino (Sicilian: Militiedddu) is a comune (municipality) in the Metropolitan City of Messina in the Italian region Sicily, located about 120 kilometres (75 mi) east of Palermo and about 80 kilometres (50 mi) west of Messina.

Militello Rosmarino borders the following municipalities: Alcara li Fusi, San Fratello, San Marco d'Alunzio, Sant'Agata di Militello, Torrenova, Capri Leone.

== History ==
Militello Rosmarino developed as the local center of Roman-Byzantine and then Arab culture in the Middle Ages, in particular under the domination of the Normans (1000 A.D.), who built a castle at the time of Roger the Guiscard (1081). The town belonged with San Marco d'Alunzio to the Regio Demanio until the Fourteenth Century.

The Aragonese made it a fief by assigning it to Sancho De Esur who was succeeded by Sancho of Aragon. In 1400 Martino d'Aragona granted Militello to Bernardo da Caprera who was followed by Enrico Rosso (1505). The Rosso family dominated throughout the century. XV with the title of barons. Enrico Rosso, in particular, was a true patron of Renaissance culture. In 1508, on Enrico's death, his son Girolamo Rosso was invested with the barony of Militello, and he was succeeded, in 1515, by Vincenzo Girolamo, who died without issue. Thus ended after more than a century the lordship of the Rosso house in Militello.

In 1573 the possession passed to the Gallego family. In 1628 Luigi Gallego had a castle built for the navy, proclaiming himself Marquis of Sant'Agata. In the 18th century the Gallegos settled in Palermo. In 1821 they gave their property to the Prince of Travia.

During the nineteenth century many families left Militello for Sant'Agata, which started a demographic decline. The decline worsened until the 1950s with emigration to the north of Italy and abroad.

== Twin towns ==
Militello Rosmarino is twinned with:

- Grumello del Monte, Italy
- Grotte, Italy
