= Gagini family =

Family of architects and sculptors

The Gagini or Gaggini were a family of architects and sculptors, originally from Bissone on Lake Lugano. This family founded Sicily's Gagini school, which flourished until the mid-1600s.

== Notable members ==
One of the most notable members include Domenico, who founded such school. One of the earliest records of his name involved a contract concluded in 1463, commissioning a monument in the church of the convent of San Francesco, Palermo, for Pietro Speciale. His son, Antonello, is considered the most important of the Gaginis and one of his works was the decorated arch in the Capella della Madonna in Trapani's Santuario dell'Annunziata. He was also known for the decorations of the apse of the Palermo cathedral in 1510 and the statue of St. George and the Dragon with panels inside the Church of San Francesco D'Assisi.

Pietro Gagini
Soprana	Domenico Gagini	Caterina
Giovanni Gagini	Caterina de Blasco	Antonello Gagini	Antonina Valena
Giandomenico s.	Antonino Gagini	Giacomo Gagini	Bonifacio Gagini	Vincenzo Gagini	Flora Gagini
Antonuzzo Gagini	Annibale Gagini	Francesco Gagini	Giuseppe Gagini
Giandomenico j.	Giuseppe Gagini

== Bibliography ==
- Gioacchino Di Marzo, I Gagini e la scultura in Sicilia nei secoli XV e XVI, Palermo 1884

== Image gallery ==
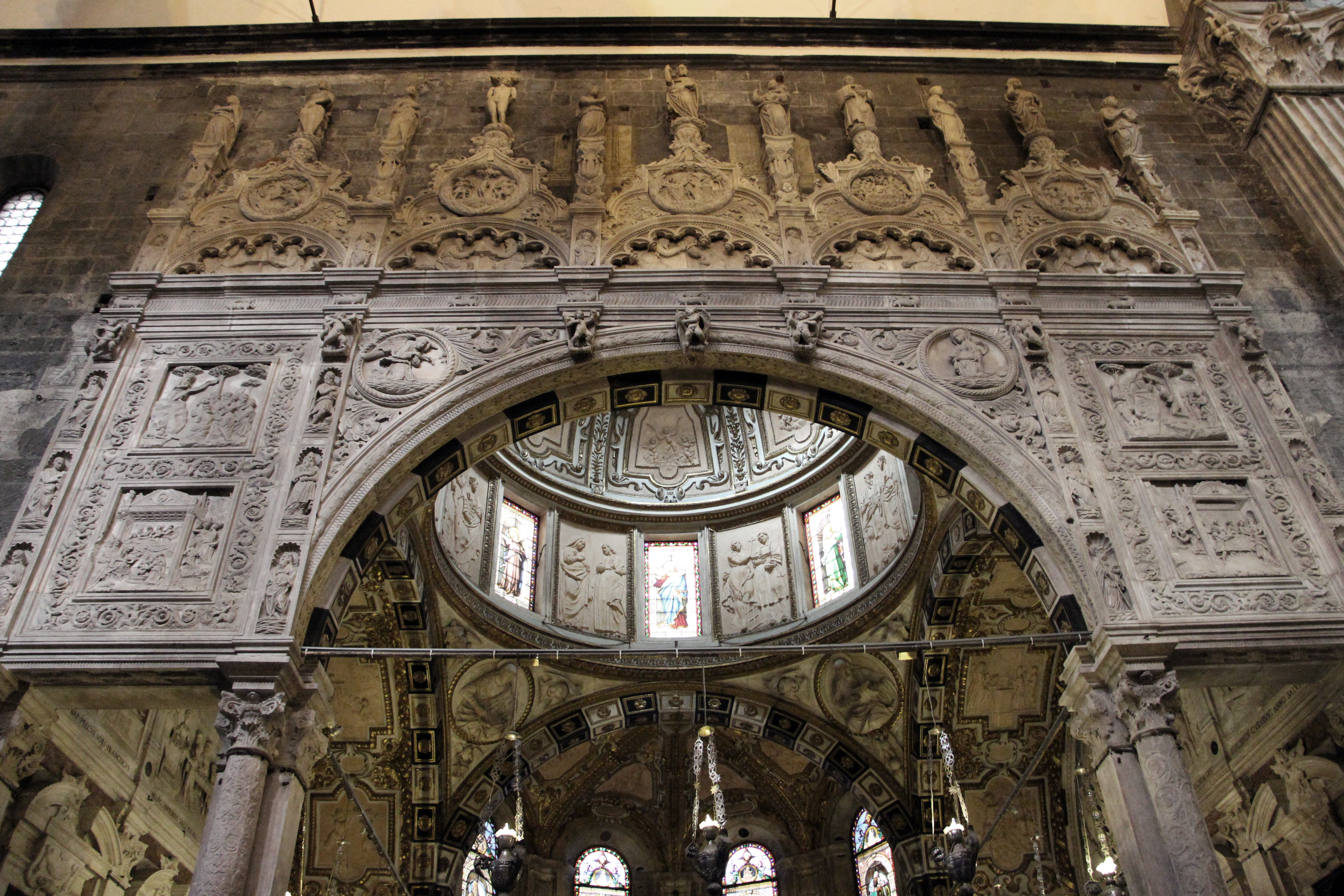
Duomo of Genoa, Chapel of St. John the Baptist, external prospect by Domenico and Elia Gagini

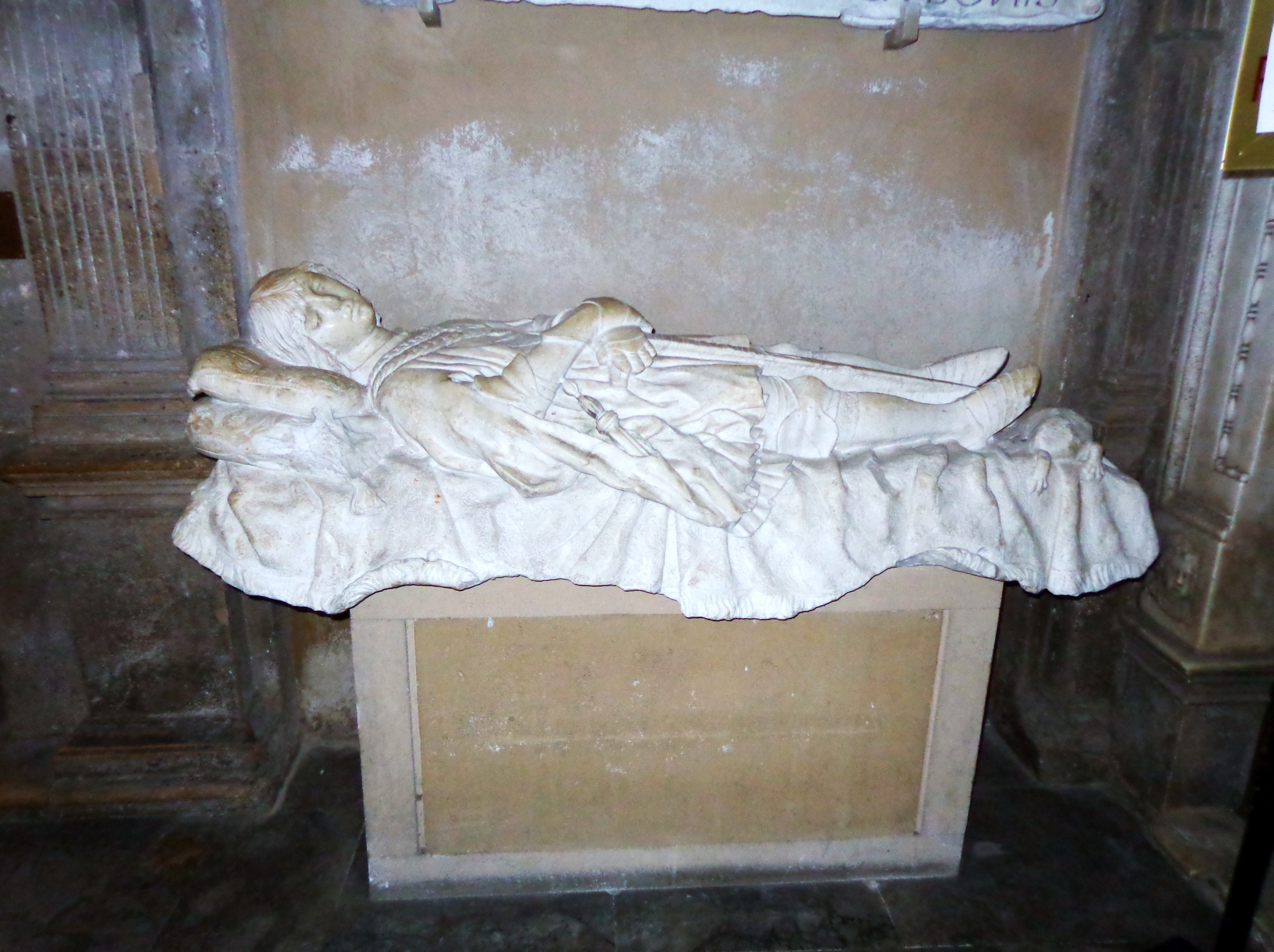
Sarcofago Speciale, by Domenico Gagini, Church of San Francesco d'Assisi, Palermo

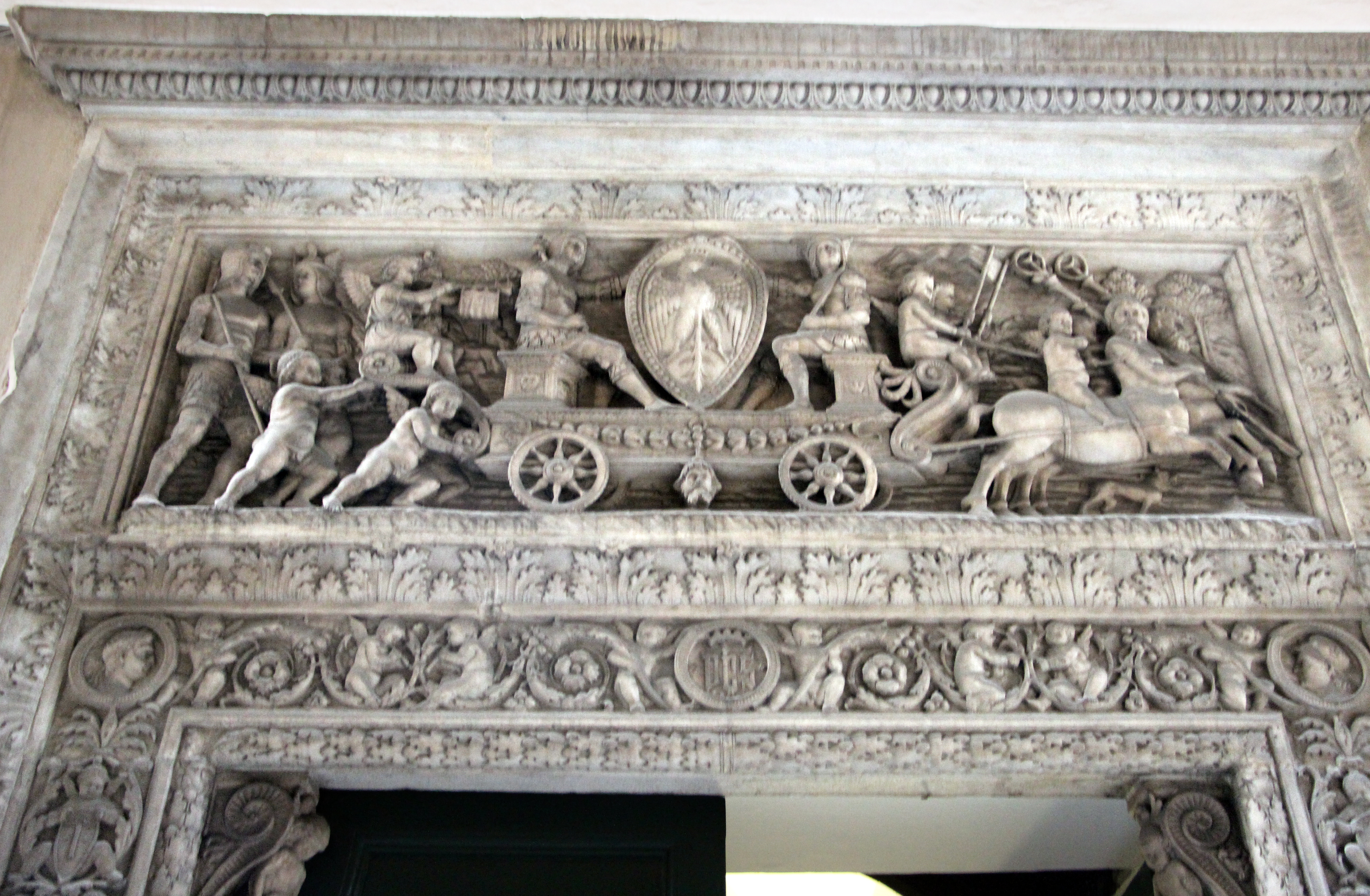
Portale del trionfo Doria, by Pace Gagini, Genoa

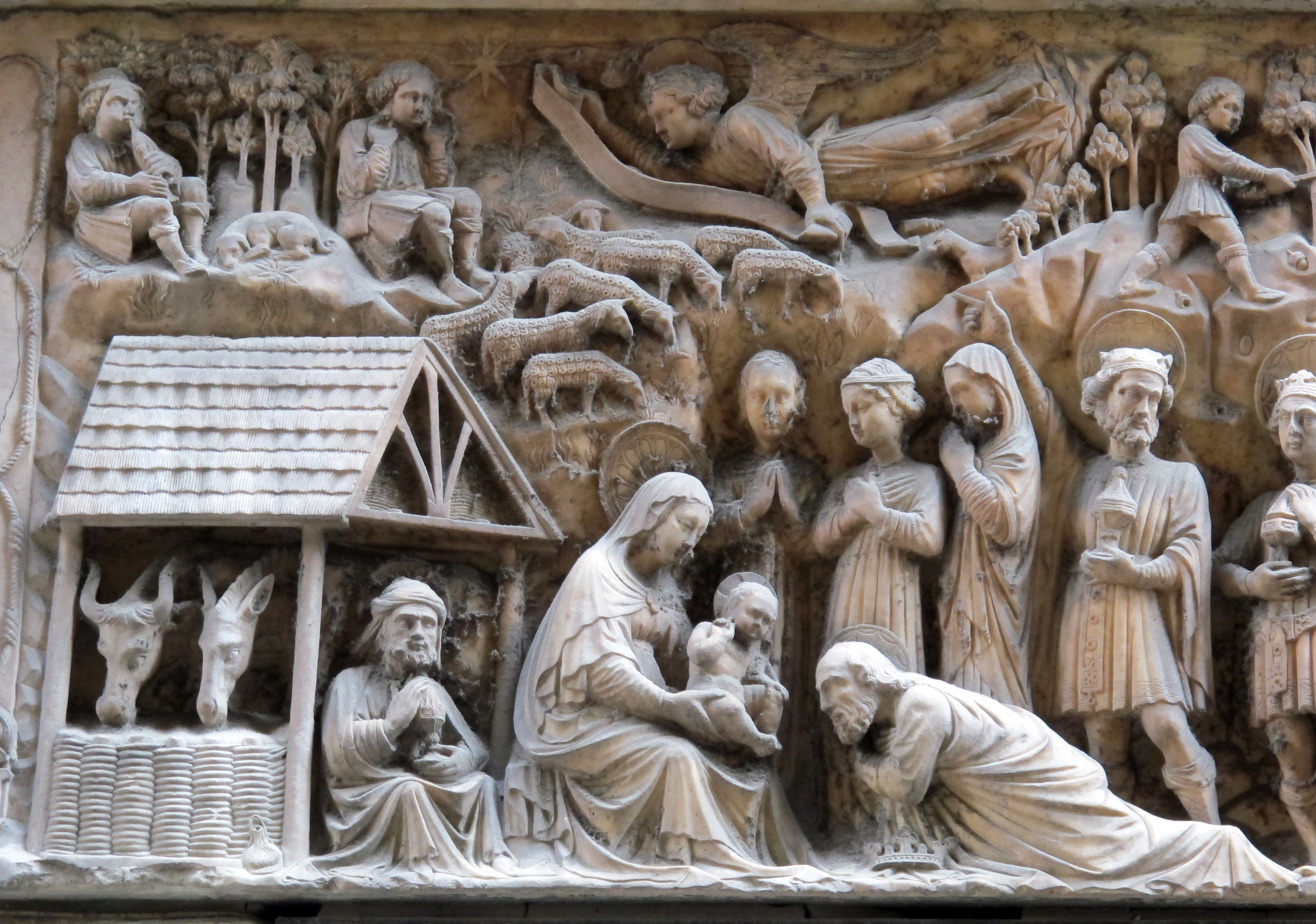
Adoration of the Magi on Via degli Orefici, Genoa

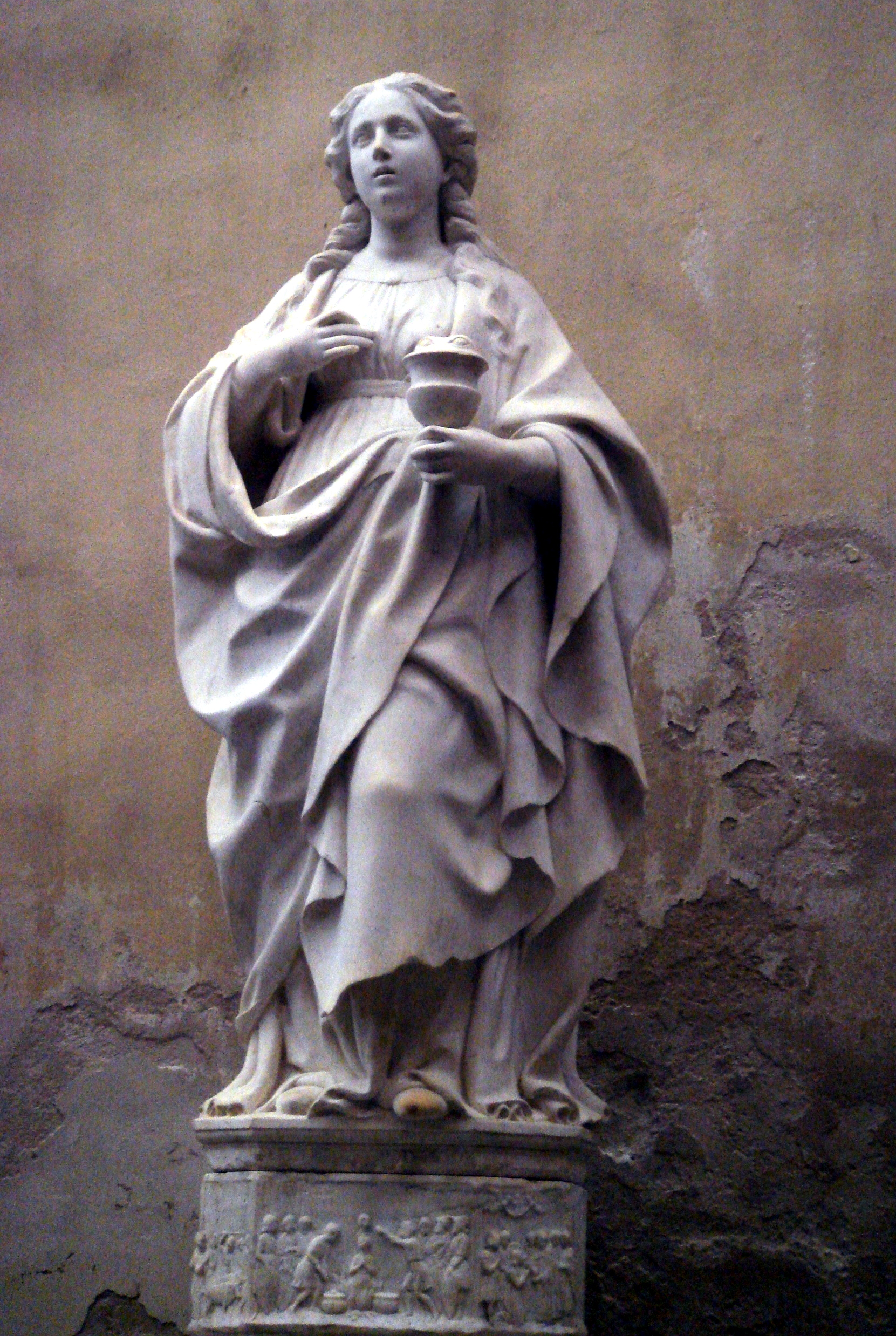
Syracuse, Cathedral, by Antonello Gagini, Saint Lucy

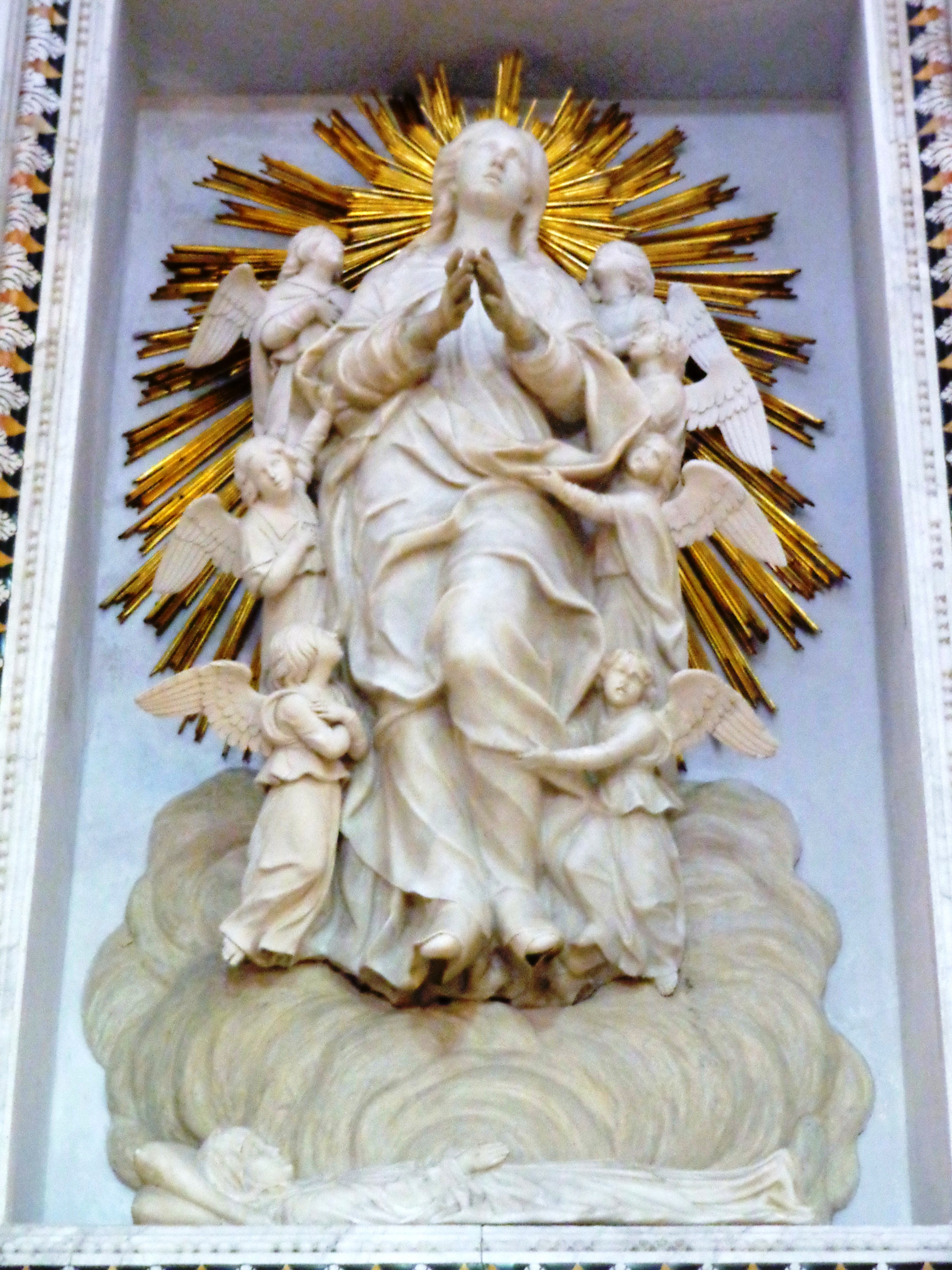
Assumption of the Virgin, by Antonello Gagini, Palermo Cathedral
