= Floresta, Sicily =

Floresta
- Comune
- Comune di Floresta
- Coat of arms

- Location within Italy Location within Sicily
- Coordinates: 37°59′N 14°55′E
- Country: Italy
- Region: Sicily
- Metropolitan city: Messina (ME)

Government
  - Mayor: Antonio Stroscio (from 11-10-2021)

Area
  - Total: 31.1 km^{2} (12.0 sq mi)
- Elevation: 1,275 m (4,183 ft)

Population (31 December 2024)
  - Total: 459
  - Density: 14.8/km^{2} (38.2/sq mi)
- Demonym: Florestani
- Time zone: UTC+1 (CET)
  - Summer (DST): UTC+2 (CEST)
- Postal code: 98030
- Dialing code: 0941
- Patron saint: Saint Anne
- Saint day: 26 July
- Website: Official website

Floresta (Sicilian: Fluresta) is a comune (municipality) in the Metropolitan City of Messina in the Italian region Sicily, located on the Nebrodi Mountains about 140 kilometres (87 mi) east of Palermo and about 60 kilometres (37 mi) southwest of Messina.

Rising at 1,275 metres, Floresta is the highest comune above sea level in Sicily. It borders the following municipalities: Raccuja, Randazzo, Montalbano Elicona, Santa Domenica Vittoria, Tortorici, Ucria.

== History ==
During the ancient period beginning around 260 BC, the heavily forested site was used by the Romans as a penal camp and to obtain the plentiful timber needed to construct their warships and transport vessels. After being abandoned in the early Middle Ages due to its isolated location and harsh winter climate, Floresta was amalgamated into the domains of King Frederick III of Sicily in the 14th century, becoming a fiefdom and a centre for the production of cereal and the raising of livestock. However Floresta was only officially established as a town in the 17th century with the Spanish king Philip III having designated Antonio Quintana Duegna "Marquis of the Forest of San Giorgio and Grassetta" in 1619.

Two hundred years later in 1820 Floresta became an independent municipality and developed its urban layout around the Sant'Anna Church and streets Via Vittorio Emanuele and Corso Umberto I characterised by traditional stone houses and winding alleys.

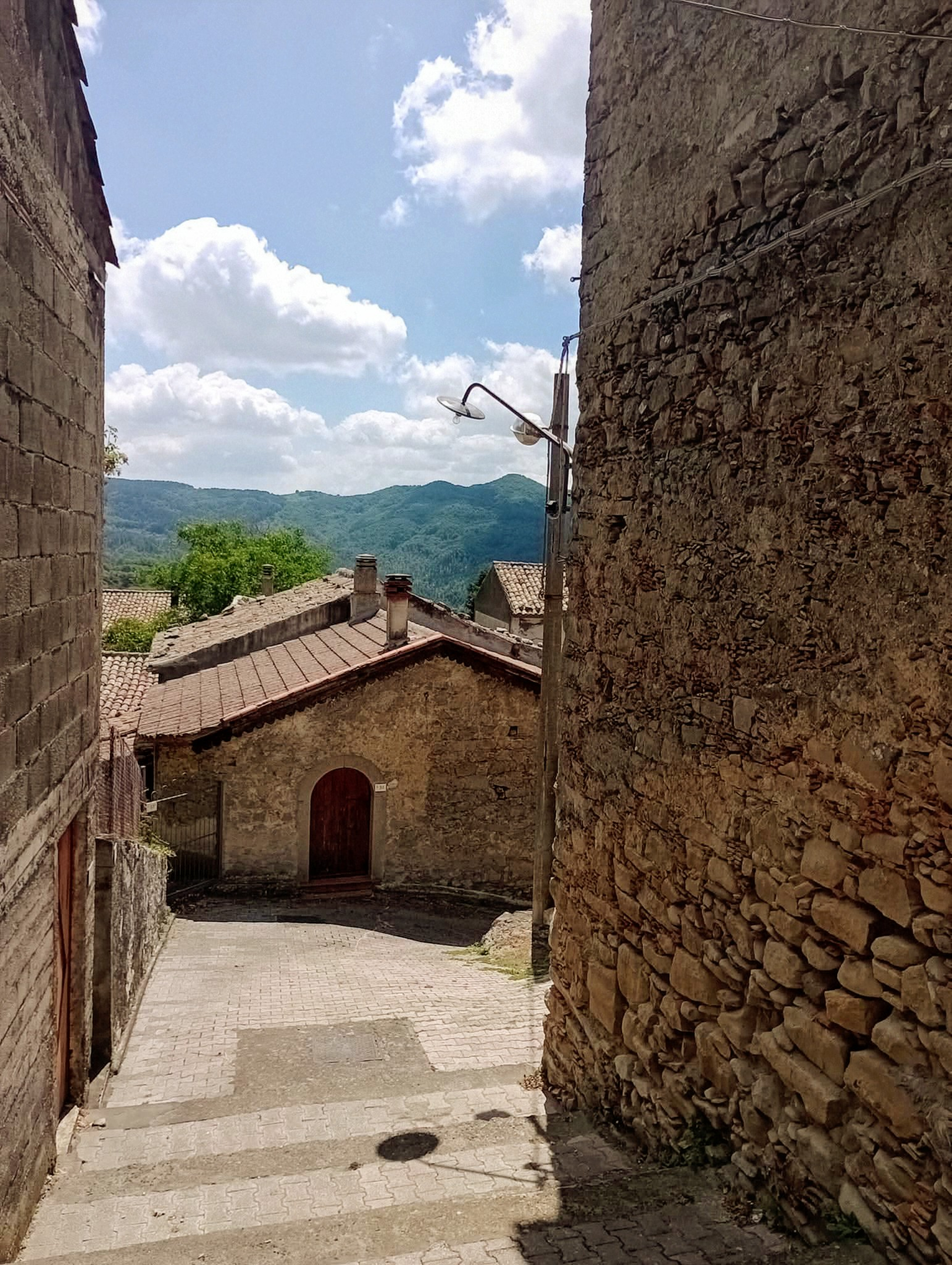
A street in Floresta with a view of the Nebrodi Mountains in the background
