= San Marco d'Alunzio =

- Comune
- Comune di San Marco d'Alunzio
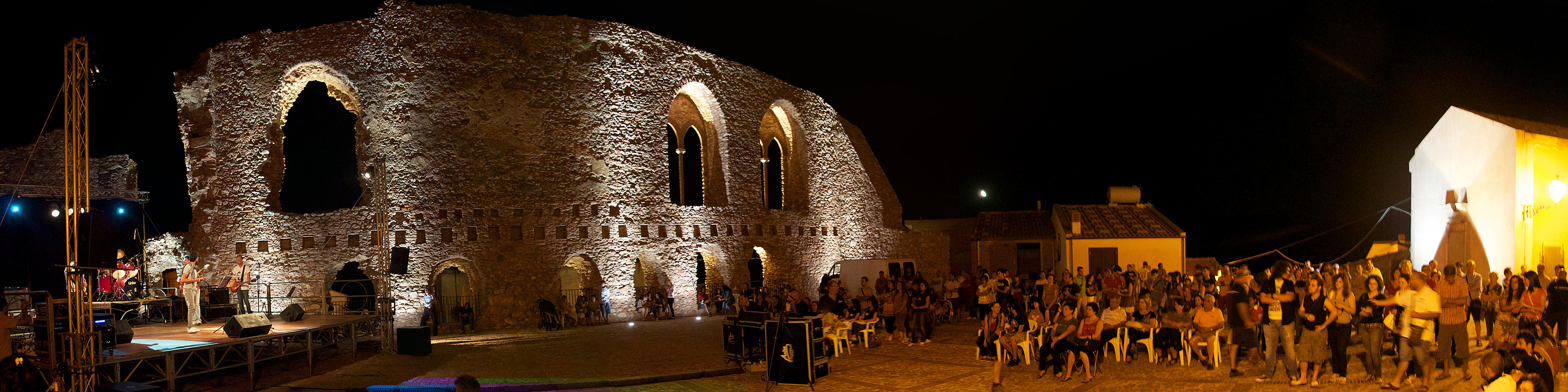

- Location within Italy Location within Sicily
- Country: Italy
- Region: Sicily
- Metropolitan city: Messina (ME)

Government
  - Mayor: Filippo Miracula

Area
  - Total: 26.14 km^{2} (10.09 sq mi)
- Elevation: 548 m (1,798 ft)

Population (30 November 2021)
  - Total: 1,828
  - Density: 69.93/km^{2} (181.1/sq mi)
- Demonym: Aluntini or Sanmarcoti
- Time zone: UTC+1 (CET)
  - Summer (DST): UTC+2 (CEST)
- Postal code: 98070
- Dialing code: 0941
- Website: Official website

San Marco d'Alunzio (Sicilian: San Marcu, Ancient Greek: Ἀλόντιον (Ptol.) or Ἀλούντιον (Dion.), Latin: Aluntium or Haluntium) is a city and comune (municipality) in the Metropolitan City of Messina in the Italian region Sicily, near the north coast of the island, located about 120 kilometres (75 mi) east of Palermo and about 80 kilometres (50 mi) west of Messina.

San Marco d'Alunzio borders the following municipalities: Alcara li Fusi, Capri Leone, Frazzanò, Longi, Militello Rosmarino, Torrenova. It is one of I Borghi più belli d'Italia ("The most beautiful villages of Italy").

== History ==
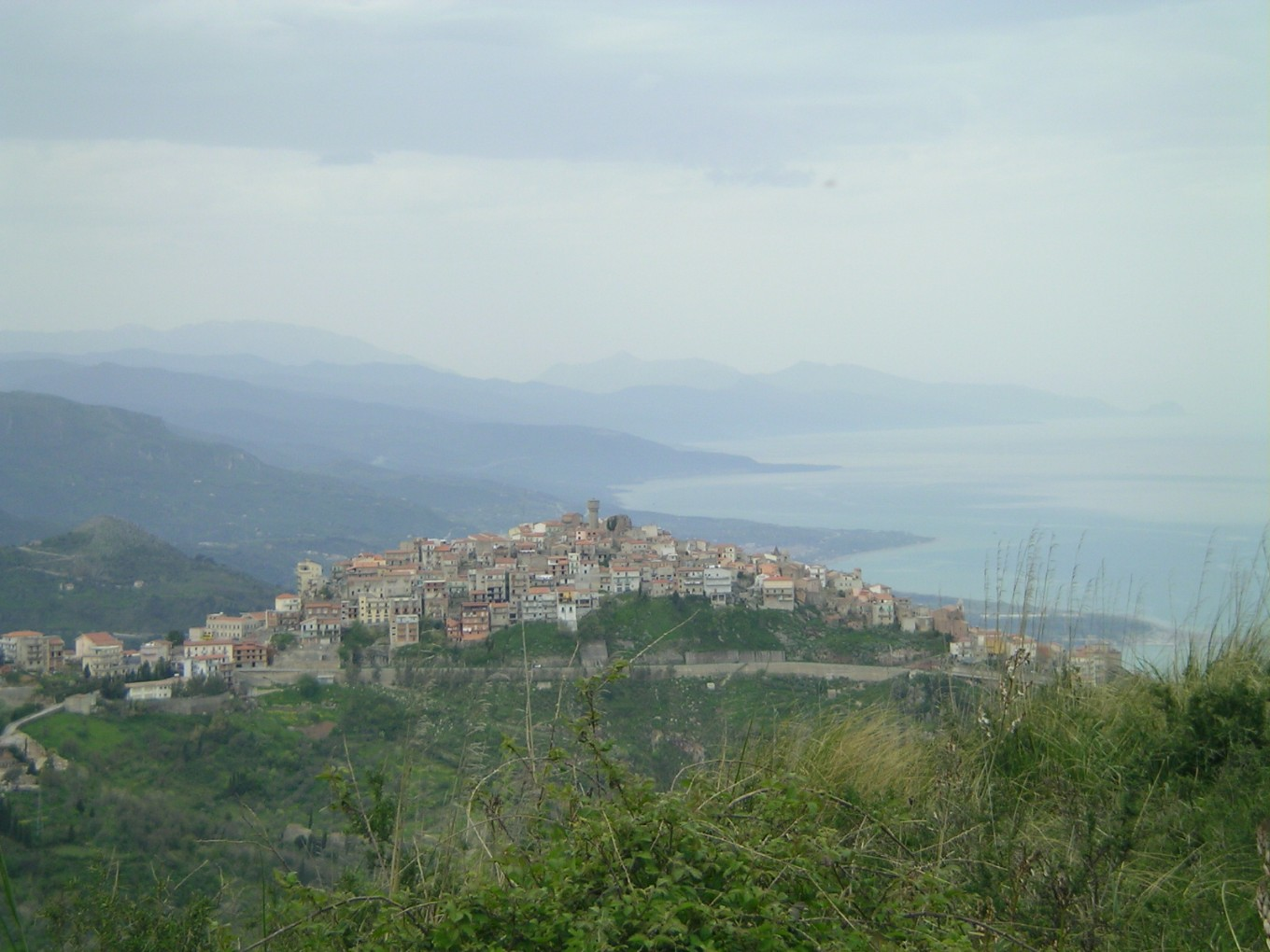
View of San Marco d'Alunzio

Aluntium or Haluntium was situated between Tyndaris and Calacte. Its foundation was ascribed by some authors to Acarnanians led by Patron, some of whom settled here after guiding Aeneas across the Ionian Sea from Greece. If this legend is true the Acarnanian colonists probably were quickly assimilated by the Sicelian, who inhabited this area in historical times. No mention of it is found in Diodorus, nor is it noticed in history prior to the Roman conquest of Sicily. But in the time of Cicero it appears to have been a place of some importance. He mentions it as having suffered severely from the exactions of Verres, who, not content with ruinous extortions of corn, compelled the inhabitants to give up all their ornamental plate. We learn from inscriptions that it retained the rank of a municipium, and was a flourishing town at least as late as the reign of Augustus.

The city sits atop a lofty hill of steep and difficult ascent, about 5 km from the Tyrrhenian Sea. This position exactly accords with that described by Cicero, who tells that Verres would not take the trouble to visit the town himself quod erat difficili ascensu atque arduo, but remained on the beach below while he sent Archagathus to execute his behests. Various inscriptions also are preserved at the site, or have been discovered there, one of which begins with the words τὸ Μουνικίπιον τῶν Ἀλοντίνων. Cluverius, following Fazello, placed Aluntium at a spot near San Filadelfo (modern San Fratello), where the ruins of an ancient city were then visible, and regarded San Marco d'Alunzio as the site of Agathyrna (now identified with modern Capo d'Orlando).

Aluntium minted coins in antiquity, some of which survive.

After the fall of the Western Roman Empire, Aluntium became part of the Byzantine Empire as Demenna. After a period under the Emirate of Sicily, it was captured by the Normans in the 11th century, and was used by Robert Guiscard as one of his main bases for the conquest of the island. As part of the Kingdom of Sicily, San Marco d'Alunzio was a fief of the Filangieri family from 1398 until 1806.

== People ==
- Scipione Rebiba (1504–1577)
- San Luca di Demenna (X century–Oct. 13th, 984)
- Bonaventura di Démena (XIV century)
