= Frazzanò =

- Comune
- Comune di Frazzanò
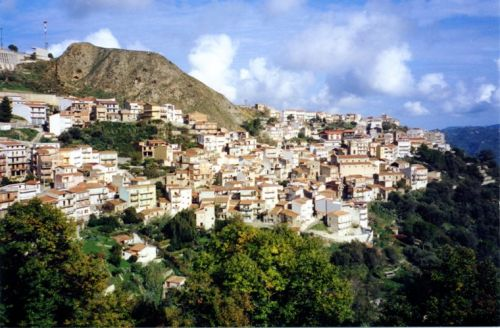

- Location within Italy Location within Sicily
- Coordinates: 38°4′N 14°45′E
- Country: Italy
- Region: Sicily
- Metropolitan city: Messina (ME)

Government
  - Mayor: Gino di Pane

Area
  - Total: 7 km^{2} (2.7 sq mi)
- Elevation: 563 m (1,847 ft)

Population (30 November 2021)
  - Total: 594
  - Density: 85/km^{2} (220/sq mi)
- Demonym: Frazzanesi
- Time zone: UTC+1 (CET)
  - Summer (DST): UTC+2 (CEST)
- Postal code: 98070
- Dialing code: 0941
- Website: Official website

Frazzanò is a comune (municipality) in the Metropolitan City of Messina in the Italian region Sicily, located about 120 kilometres (75 mi) east of Palermo and about 70 kilometres (43 mi) west of Messina.

Frazzanò borders the following municipalities: Capri Leone, Galati Mamertino, Longi, Mirto, San Marco d'Alunzio, San Salvatore di Fitalia.
