= Giacinto Artale =

Italian politician (1906–1970)

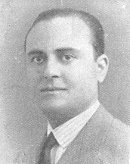
Giacinto Artale

Giacinto Artale (18 April 1906 – 30 May 1970) was an Italian politician belonging to the Christian Democracy party.

Artale was born in Ficarra. He was elected a member of the Chamber of Deputies in 1948.
