= Antonello Gagini =

Italian sculptor

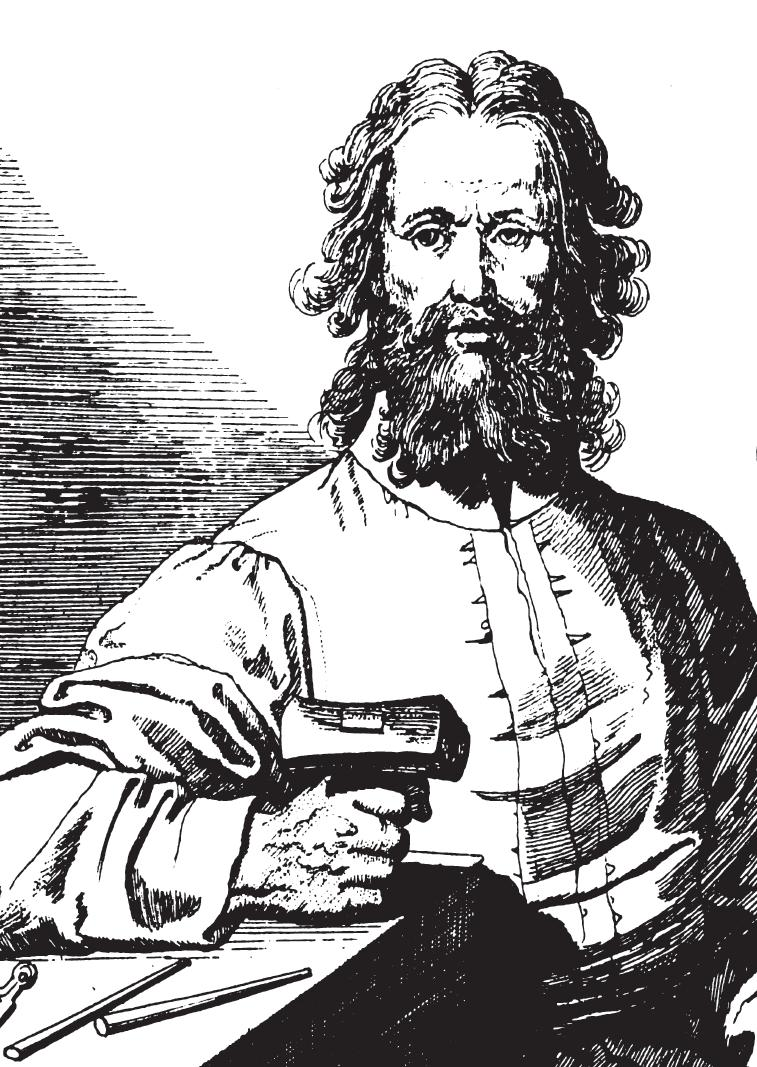
Antonello Gagini

Antonello Gagini (1478 in Palermo – 1536 in Palermo) was an Italian sculptor of the Renaissance, mainly active in Sicily and Calabria.

Antonello belonged to a family of sculptors and artisans, originally from Northern Italy, but active throughout Italy, including Genoa, Florence, and Rome. The family included his father, Domenico (1449–1492), also a sculptor. Antonello had five sons who were sculptors: Antonio (or Antonino; 1510s–1574), Fazio (1520s–1567), Giacomo (1517–1598), Giandomenico (1503-1560s), and Vicenzo (1527–1595).

Antonello was born, in 1478, in Palermo, where the Gagini family had settled in 1463. Antonello is said to have aided Michelangelo in the sculptural work on the massive tomb of Pope Julius II in San Pietro in Vincoli, a project now known for the statue of Moses.

One of Antonio Gagini's most notable works is the decorated arch in the Capella della Madonna in the Santuario dell'Annunziata in Trapani which he completed in 1537. Antonello also completed decorative ecclesiastical sculpture in the area of Messina. A large collection of his works including an Annunciation, Madonna with Child, Madonna of the Snow and the Appearance of the Cross to Constantine are now in the Palazzo Abatellis in Palermo. In the Chiesa dell'Addolorata in Soverato Superiore, Calabria there is the "Pietà", a representation of Mary and her dead son. He worked also at the Cathedral of Palermo. Other works were destroyed during earthquakes. He helped train Giacomo del Duca.
