= Tortorici =

Tortorici Mìra (Greek)
- Comune
- Comune di Tortorici
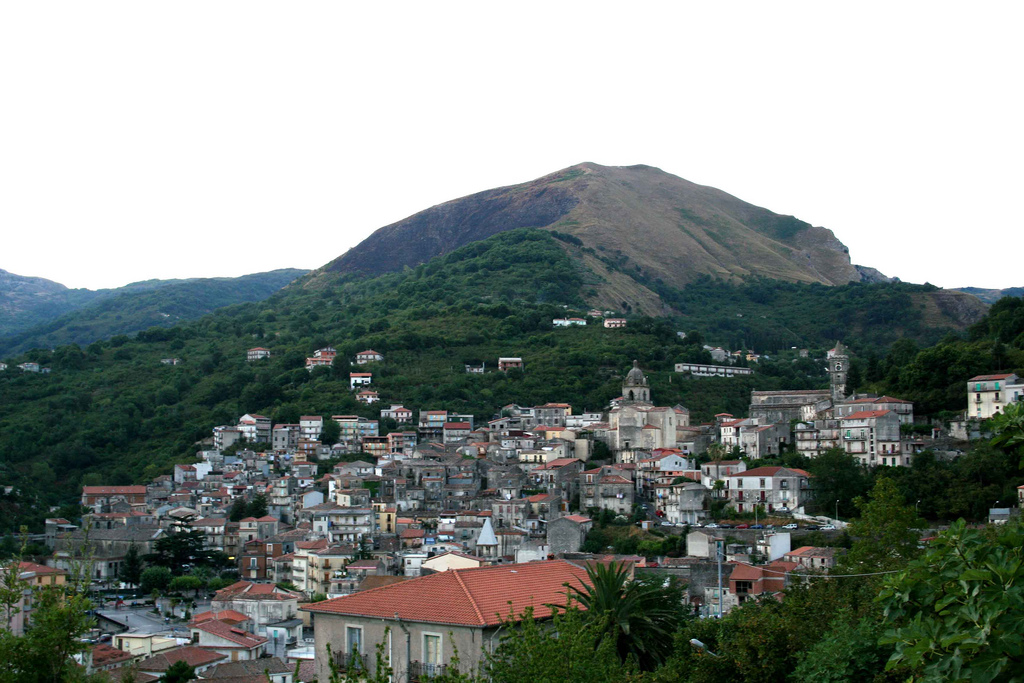

- Coat of arms

- Location within Italy Location within Sicily
- Coordinates: 38°2′N 14°49′E
- Country: Italy
- Region: Sicily
- Metropolitan city: Messina (ME)
- Frazioni: Batana, Bruca, Capreria, Capuccini, Colla, Casitti, Fiumara, Grandusa, Grazia, Ilombati, Lembo, Martini, Masugna, Mercurio, Marù, Moira, Pagliara, Parisi, Piano Canne, Potame, Pullo, San Leonardo, Salvo, Sant'Andrea, Santa Nagra, Sceti, Sciortino, Serro Alloro, Serro Polino, S. Sergio

Government
  - Mayor: Carmelo Rizzo Nervo

Area
  - Total: 70.5 km^{2} (27.2 sq mi)
- Elevation: 450 m (1,480 ft)

Population (30 November 2011)
  - Total: 5,800
  - Density: 82/km^{2} (210/sq mi)
- Demonym: Oricensi or Tortoriciani
- Time zone: UTC+1 (CET)
  - Summer (DST): UTC+2 (CEST)
- Postal code: 98078
- Dialing code: 0941
- Website: Official website

Tortorici (Sicilian: Turturici) is a comune (municipality) in the Metropolitan City of Messina in the Italian region Sicily, located about 130 kilometres (81 mi) east of Palermo and about 70 kilometres (43 mi) west of Messina.

Located in the Nebrodi regional park, Tortorici borders the following municipalities: Bronte, Castell'Umberto, Floresta, Galati Mamertino, Longi, Randazzo, San Salvatore di Fitalia, Sinagra, Ucria.

== People ==
- Adriana Faranda (born 1950)

== Main sights ==
- San Francesco: church and monastery
