= Torrenova =

- Comune
- Comune di Torrenova
- Location within Italy Location within Sicily
- Coordinates: 38°5′N 14°41′E
- Country: Italy
- Region: Sicily
- Metropolitan city: Messina (ME)

Area
  - Total: 13.0 km^{2} (5.0 sq mi)
- Elevation: 10 m (33 ft)

Population (Dec. 2004)
  - Total: 5,635
  - Density: 433/km^{2} (1,120/sq mi)
- Demonym: Torrenovesi
- Time zone: UTC+1 (CET)
  - Summer (DST): UTC+2 (CEST)
- Postal code: 98070
- Dialing code: 0941

Torrenova (Sicilian: Turrinova) is a comune (municipality) in the Province of Messina in the Italian region Sicily, located about 130 kilometres (81 mi) east of Palermo and about 80 kilometres (50 mi) west of Messina. As of 31 December 2004, it had a population of 5,635 and an area of 13.0 square kilometres (5.0 mi^{2}).

Torrenova borders the following municipalities: Capo d'Orlando, Capri Leone, Militello Rosmarino, San Marco d'Alunzio, Sant'Agata di Militello.

== Demographic evolution ==
Historical population

Year	Pop.	±%
1861	638	—
1871	768	+20.4%
1881	823	+7.2%
1901	1,109	+34.8%
1911	1,095	−1.3%

Year	Pop.	±%
1921	1,303	+19.0%
1931	1,686	+29.4%
1936	1,867	+10.7%
1951	1,098	−41.2%
1961	1,558	+41.9%

Year	Pop.	±%
1971	1,540	−1.2%
1981	2,834	+84.0%
1991	3,414	+20.5%
2001	3,691	+8.1%

Source: Data from ISTAT
