= Longi =

Municipality in Sicily, Italy

- Comune
- Comune di Longi
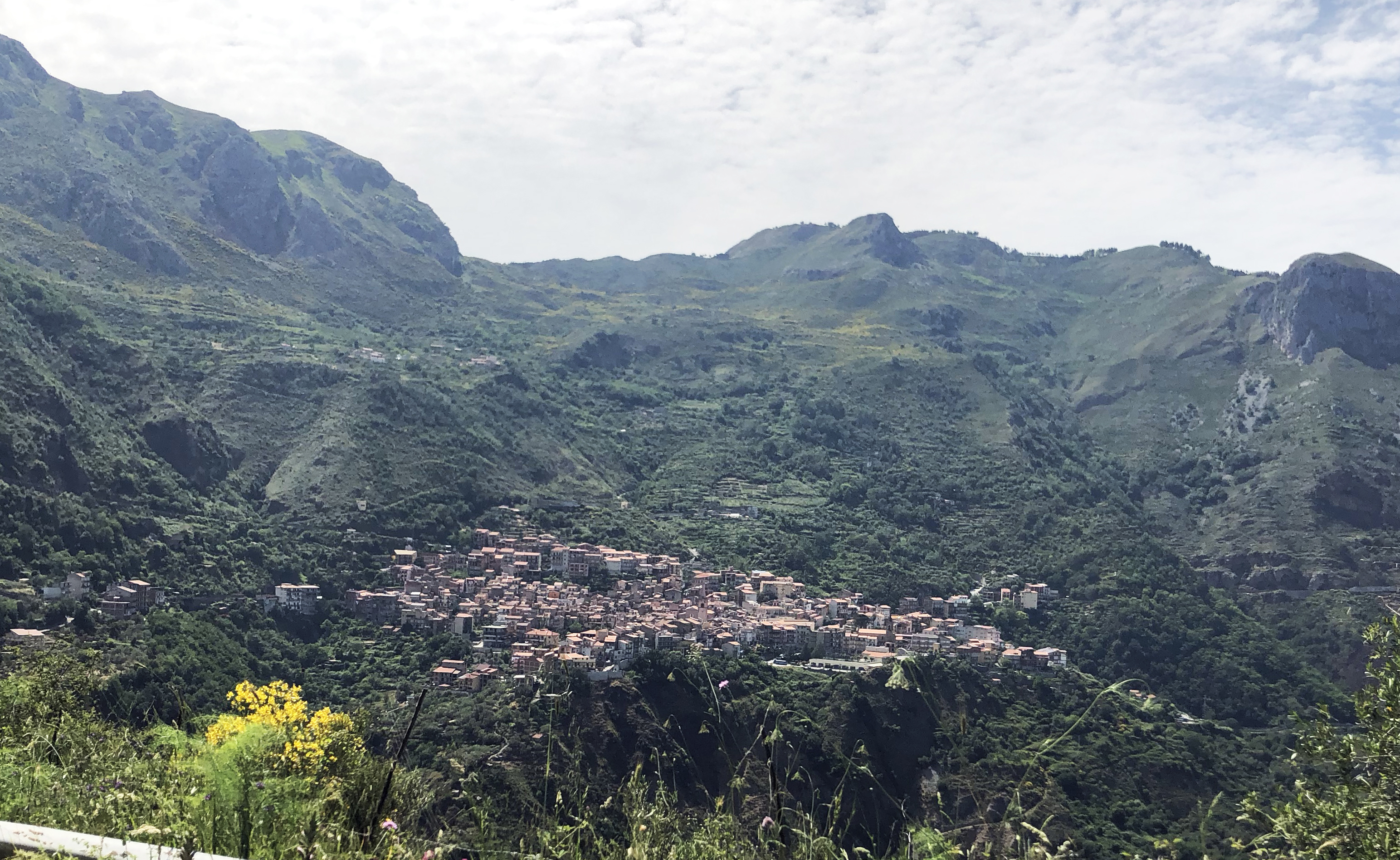

- Location within Italy Location within Sicily
- Coordinates: 38°2′N 14°45′E
- Country: Italy
- Region: Sicily
- Metropolitan city: Messina (ME)
- Frazioni: Stazzone, Crocetta, Pado, Filipelli

Government
  - Mayor: Fabio Antonio

Area
  - Total: 42.2 km^{2} (16.3 sq mi)
- Elevation: 616 m (2,021 ft)

Population (30 November 2021)
  - Total: 1,350
  - Density: 32.0/km^{2} (82.9/sq mi)
- Demonym: Longesi
- Time zone: UTC+1 (CET)
  - Summer (DST): UTC+2 (CEST)
- Postal code: 98070
- Dialing code: 0941
- Website: Official website

Longi (Sicilian: Lonci) is a comune (municipality) in the Metropolitan City of Messina in the Italian region Sicily, located about 120 kilometres (75 mi) east of Palermo and about 70 kilometres (43 mi) west of Messina.

Longi borders the following municipalities: Alcara li Fusi, Bronte, Cesarò, Frazzanò, Galati Mamertino, Maniace, San Marco d'Alunzio, Tortorici.
