= Galati Mamertino =

- Comune
- Comune di Galati Mamertino
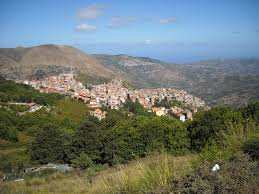

- Location within Italy Location within Sicily
- Coordinates: 38°2′N 14°46′E
- Country: Italy
- Region: Sicily
- Metropolitan city: Messina (ME)
- Frazioni: San Basilio

Government
  - Mayor: Vincenzo Amadore

Area
  - Total: 39.31 km^{2} (15.18 sq mi)
- Elevation: 820 m (2,690 ft)

Population (31 August 2021)
  - Total: 2,346
  - Density: 59.68/km^{2} (154.6/sq mi)
- Demonym: Galatesi
- Time zone: UTC+1 (CET)
  - Summer (DST): UTC+2 (CEST)
- Postal code: 98070
- Dialing code: 0941
- Website: Official website

Galati Mamertino is a comune (municipality) in the Metropolitan City of Messina in the Italian region Sicily, located about 120 kilometres (75 mi) east of Palermo and about 70 kilometres (43 mi) west of Messina.

Galati Mamertino borders the following municipalities: Frazzanò, Longi, San Salvatore di Fitalia, and Tortorici.

== People ==
- Antonio Lombardo (1891–1928)
