= Capri Leone =

- Comune
- Comune di Capri Leone
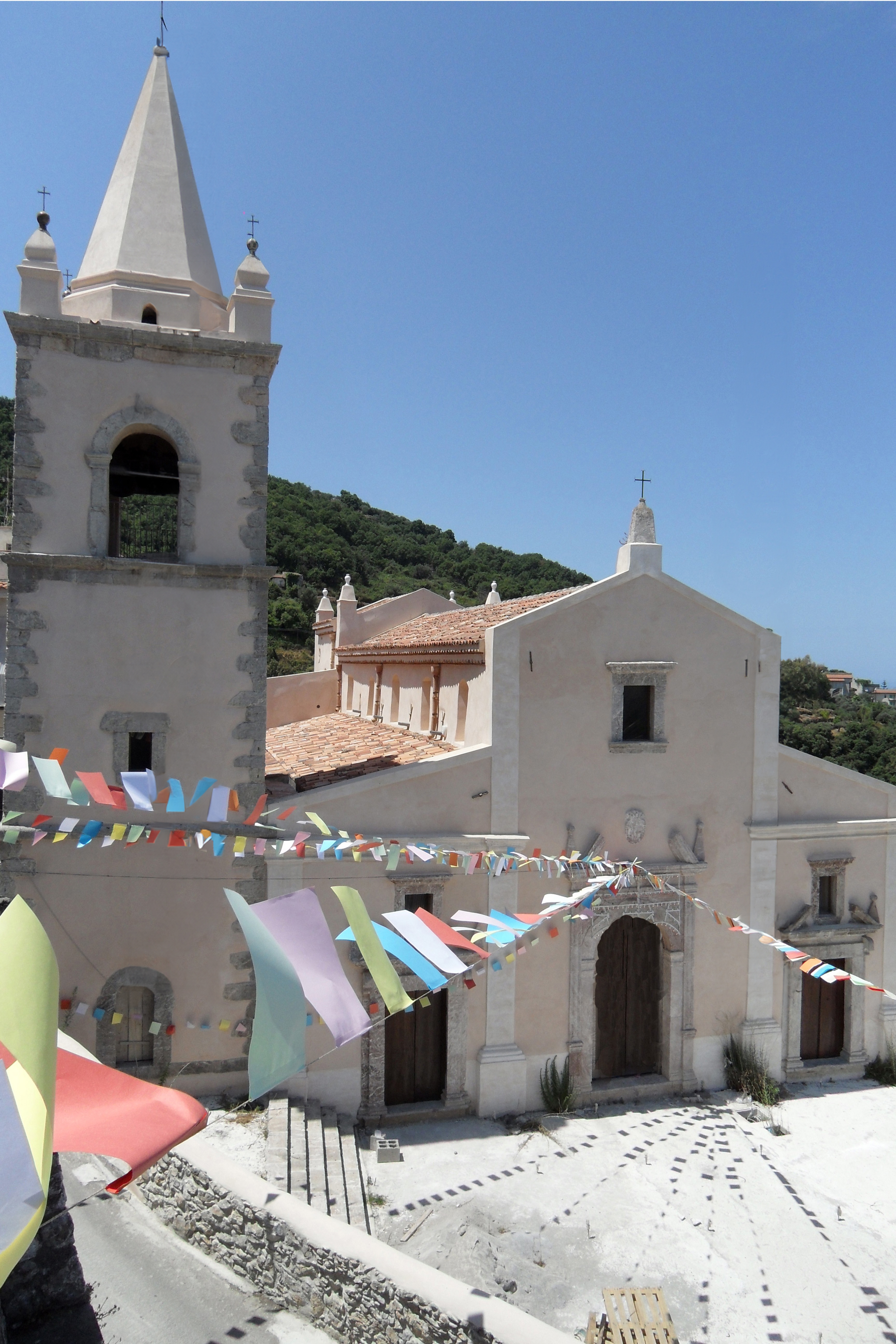
- Church of the Annunciation.

- Location within Italy Location within Sicily
- Coordinates: 38°5′N 14°44′E
- Country: Italy
- Region: Sicily
- Metropolitan city: Messina (ME)
- Frazioni: Rocca di Capri Leone

Government
  - Mayor: Bernadette Grasso

Area
  - Total: 6.76 km^{2} (2.61 sq mi)
- Elevation (Rocca di Capri Leone: 30): 420 m (1,380 ft)

Population (31 December 2021)
  - Total: 4,313
  - Density: 638/km^{2} (1,650/sq mi)
- Demonym: Caprileonesi or Capritani
- Time zone: UTC+1 (CET)
  - Summer (DST): UTC+2 (CEST)
- Postal code: 98070
- Dialing code: 0941
- Patron saint: St. Constantine
- Saint day: Last Saturday in July
- Website: Official website

Capri Leone (Sicilian: Capri Liuni) is a comune (municipality) in the Metropolitan City of Messina in the southern Italian region Sicily, located about 120 kilometres (75 mi) east of Palermo and about 70 kilometres (43 mi) west of Messina. Capri Leone sits in the foothills of the Nebrodi Mountains. Capri Leone borders the following municipalities: Capo d'Orlando, Frazzanò, Mirto, San Marco d'Alunzio, Torrenova.

== History ==
The town was originally called just “Capri”. The “Leone” was added only in 1862 after the formation of the Kingdom of Italy to distinguish it from other Italian Capris. It was apparently founded only in the medieval times and it is known in 1320 to have been in the fiefdom of Count Vitale de Aloysio. It subsequently passed through the hands of several Baronial families, including those of the Lancellotto di Larcan, the Filangeri di Mirto, the Balsamo, the Branciforte, and the Cordona. In 1620, it again passed into the hands of the Filangeri di Mirto family. It apparently remained in their possession until the reforms of the early 19th century.
