= Cesarò =

- Comune
- Comune di Cesarò
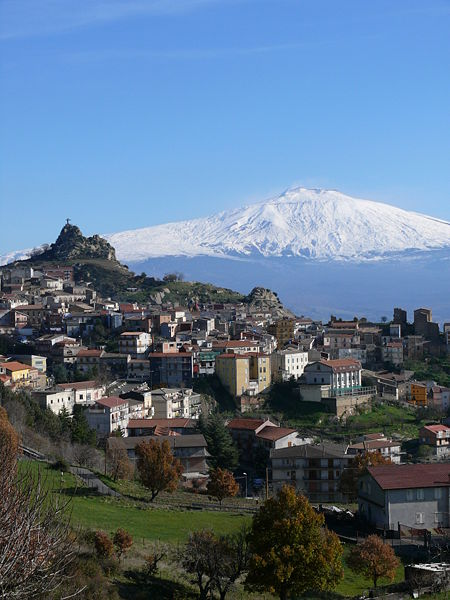

- Coat of arms

- Location within Italy Location within Sicily
- Coordinates: 37°51′N 14°43′E
- Country: Italy
- Region: Sicily
- Metropolitan city: Messina (ME)

Government
  - Mayor: Katia Antonina Ceraldi

Area
  - Total: 216.93 km^{2} (83.76 sq mi)
- Elevation: 1,150 m (3,770 ft)

Population (30 November 2021)
  - Total: 2,182
  - Density: 10.06/km^{2} (26.05/sq mi)
- Demonym: Cesaresi
- Time zone: UTC+1 (CET)
  - Summer (DST): UTC+2 (CEST)
- Postal code: 98033
- Dialing code: 095
- Patron saint: St. Calogerus
- Saint day: 18 June
- Website: Official website

Cesarò is a comune (municipality) in the Metropolitan City of Messina in the Italian region Sicily, located about 120 kilometres (75 mi) east of Palermo and about 80 kilometres (50 mi) southwest of Messina.

It is included in the Parco dei Nebrodi.
