= Ficarra =

- Comune
- Comune di Ficarra
- Coat of arms

- Location within Italy Location within Sicily
- Coordinates: 38°6′N 14°50′E
- Country: Italy
- Region: Sicily
- Metropolitan city: Messina (ME)
- Frazioni: Matini, Crocevia, Sauro, Rinella

Government
  - Mayor: Basilio Ridolfo

Area
  - Total: 18.66 km^{2} (7.20 sq mi)
- Elevation: 450 m (1,480 ft)

Population (30 June 2022)
  - Total: 1,300
  - Density: 70/km^{2} (180/sq mi)
- Demonym: Ficarresi
- Time zone: UTC+1 (CET)
  - Summer (DST): UTC+2 (CEST)
- Postal code: 98062
- Dialing code: 0941
- Patron saint: Madonna SS. Annunziata
- Saint day: March 25 and August 5
- Website: Official website

Ficarra is a comune (municipality) in the Metropolitan City of Messina in the Italian region Sicily, located about 130 kilometres (81 mi) east of Palermo and about 60 kilometres (37 mi) west of Messina, in the Monti Nebrodi. It is surrounded by woods of hazel and olive trees.

== History ==
Ficarra is believed to be Mediaeval in origin, possibly during the Muslim Emirate of Sicily. The name may be derived from the Arabic Fakhar (meaning: glorious), or the Sicilian Ficara (meaning: a field of figs).

== Main sights ==
- Convent of the Minor Friars of St. Francis, dating to 1522
- Sanctuary of the Annunziata (15th century)
- Jail Fortress, originating as a watch tower and later turned into an austere stone fortress with square plan. It was damaged by bombs during World War II.

== Notable people ==
- Giacinto Artale (1906–1970)
- Daniel Ricciardo - paternal family hails from the comune.

== Twin towns ==
- Vigevano, Italy
