= Naso, Sicily =

Naso Nìsos (Greek)
- Comune
- Comune di Naso
- Location within Italy Location within Sicily
- Coordinates: 38°7′N 14°47′E
- Country: Italy
- Region: Sicily
- Metropolitan city: Messina (ME)
- Frazioni: Bazia, Brucoli, Cagnanò, Caria Ferro, Cresta, Feudo, Francì, Gattina, Madonnuzza, Maina, Miceli, Malò, Ficheruzza, Grazia, Munafò, Munidari, Piano San Cono, Ponte Naso, Risari, San Giorgio, Sant'Antonio, Valentino

Government
  - Mayor: Daniele Letizia

Area
  - Total: 36 km^{2} (14 sq mi)
- Elevation: 490 m (1,610 ft)

Population (30 November 2011)
  - Total: 4,070
  - Density: 110/km^{2} (290/sq mi)
- Demonym(s): Nasitani, Nasensi
- Time zone: UTC+1 (CET)
  - Summer (DST): UTC+2 (CEST)
- Postal code: 98074
- Dialing code: 0941
- Patron saint: St. Conon
- Saint day: September 1
- Website: http://www.comune.naso.me.it/

Naso (Sicilian: Nasu) is a town and comune in northeastern Sicily, Italy, administratively part of the Metropolitan City of Messina. As of 2011, it had a population of 4,070.

== History ==
Origins

Naso, a village with roots in the early Middle Ages, was established by people seeking refuge from Arab invasions. The settlement's establishment around the 9th century AD is documented by Carlo Incudine. Residents from neighboring regions, especially Agatirso and Nasida, relocated to higher terrains for safety.

Historian Giuseppe Buttà, a Naso native, provides an account: "Naso, often referred to as 'Castel di Naso' by ancient historians, stands on the ruins of Nasida. Located near the present town of Ficarra, Nasida was notable due to Basilian Abbot Conone Navacita, a revered figure from the era of King Roger II. The relics of St. Conone, born under King Roger II and believed to have died in 1236, are preserved here, and he is honored as the town's patron saint."

Nearby Capo d'Orlando hosted the ancient settlement of Agathyrsum, believed to be founded by Agathirsus, son of Aeolus. Historical records differ in their naming conventions, with some, like Diodorus (90-27 BC), referring to it as "Agathyrnus," while others, including Polybius (200-118 BC), called it 'Agathirsa’. Over time, after Agathyrsum was razed by Muslims, its inhabitants migrated to Nasida, which was also eventually destroyed by the Saracens. Survivors from Nasida then established Naso on a fortified hill.

Norman Era

During Norman rule, Naso first appeared as "Nasa" in 1082 when Count Roger documented a property grant to the Church of Traina. This name resurfaced in 1094 when Count Roger endowed part of the 'Nasa' castle to the Abbey of St. Bartholomew. Over time, Naso changed hands among prominent feudal families like the Barresi and the Alagona.

The Middle Ages in Naso were marked by frequent changes in dominion. Historian V. Castelli summarized the tumultuous transitions, highlighting the rule of prominent figures such as Goffredo di Naso, Gualtieri di Guantes, Abbo Barresi, and various others spanning centuries. The town was adversely affected by numerous earthquakes, notably in 1693 when it suffered extensive damage.

Later periods

By the 18th century, Naso was under the dominion of the Sandoval family. Giovan Diego of the Sandoval, in particular, was notorious for his oppressive rule. In 1788, Naso was declared a State town by the decree of Ferdinand IV. An earthquake in 1823 further damaged the town, leading to the collapse of several significant structures.

In more recent times, like many Sicilian towns, Naso faced economic challenges, compounded by significant emigration during the 19th and 20th centuries. Presently, the town's economy revolves around agribusiness and tourism.

== Etymology ==
The ancient town of Naso has been historically referred to by various names, including "Neso" and "Nasus". Historical records dating back to 1545 mention the town as "Neso", believed to be located near a region called ‘Nesia’ close to Mount Etna. This name evolved over time, and by the 18th century, references describe the town as ‘Naso’ [Nose], noting its proximity to ‘Nesia’ and the promontory 'Capo d'Orlando'.

Early etymological interpretations by scholars Berosus and G.B. Caruso suggest that Naso's original name, "Nesus", later became "Nasus". They believed that the town's name might be derived from the Greek word "Nesos", meaning "island", signifying a remote or secluded spot. However, the renowned linguist Gerald Rohlfs contested this interpretation, arguing that the name 'Nasus' likely originates from the Latin 'nasus', which means 'nose' or 'tip'. This perspective aligns with Carlo Battisti's view, emphasizing that some names previously thought to have Greek origins were in fact derived from Latin, as evidenced by adjectival suffixes.

Delving deeper into the linguistic evolution of the name, Rodney Sampson posits that the vowel /a/ tends to shift to /e/ when adjacent to nasal consonants /m, n/ in certain Southern Italian dialects. This phonetic phenomenon, seen in Neo-Latin languages like French, transforms Latin "Nasum" to French "Nez" (nose). Further complicating the debate, Franz Bopp suggested a connection between the Greek "Nesos" and the Sanskrit 'nasa' and Latin 'nasus', proposing that 'Nesos' might have originally meant 'nose' or 'cape'.

Evidence from "Classics and Oriental Studies" adds another layer of complexity, suggesting that "Nesos-Nasos" could signify a 'mountain' or specifically a 'populated mountain'. This challenges the common interpretation of "Naso" meaning 'island', proposing instead that its true essence might be closer to 'nose', 'hump', or even 'mountain'.

== People ==
- Conon of Naso (1139–1236)
- Lady Gaga's paternal great-grandparents immigrated from Naso, Italy to New York, United States in 1904.

== Attractions ==
The most important monuments of the village are the Baroque Mother Church, dedicated to the SS Apostoli Filippo and Giordano, includes impressive works of art created in the 16th century; the Church of Santissimo Salvatore, built in the 16th century, includes precious paintings and frescos dating back to the 17th century; the Church of Santa Maria del Gesù, built in the 15th century; the Sacred Art Maueum, located in the “Catacombs of San Cono”, was opened to the public in May 2002 with the aim to preserve and promote the knowledge of the historical and artistic heritage collected from local churches.
