= Ucria =

- Comune
- Comune di Ucria
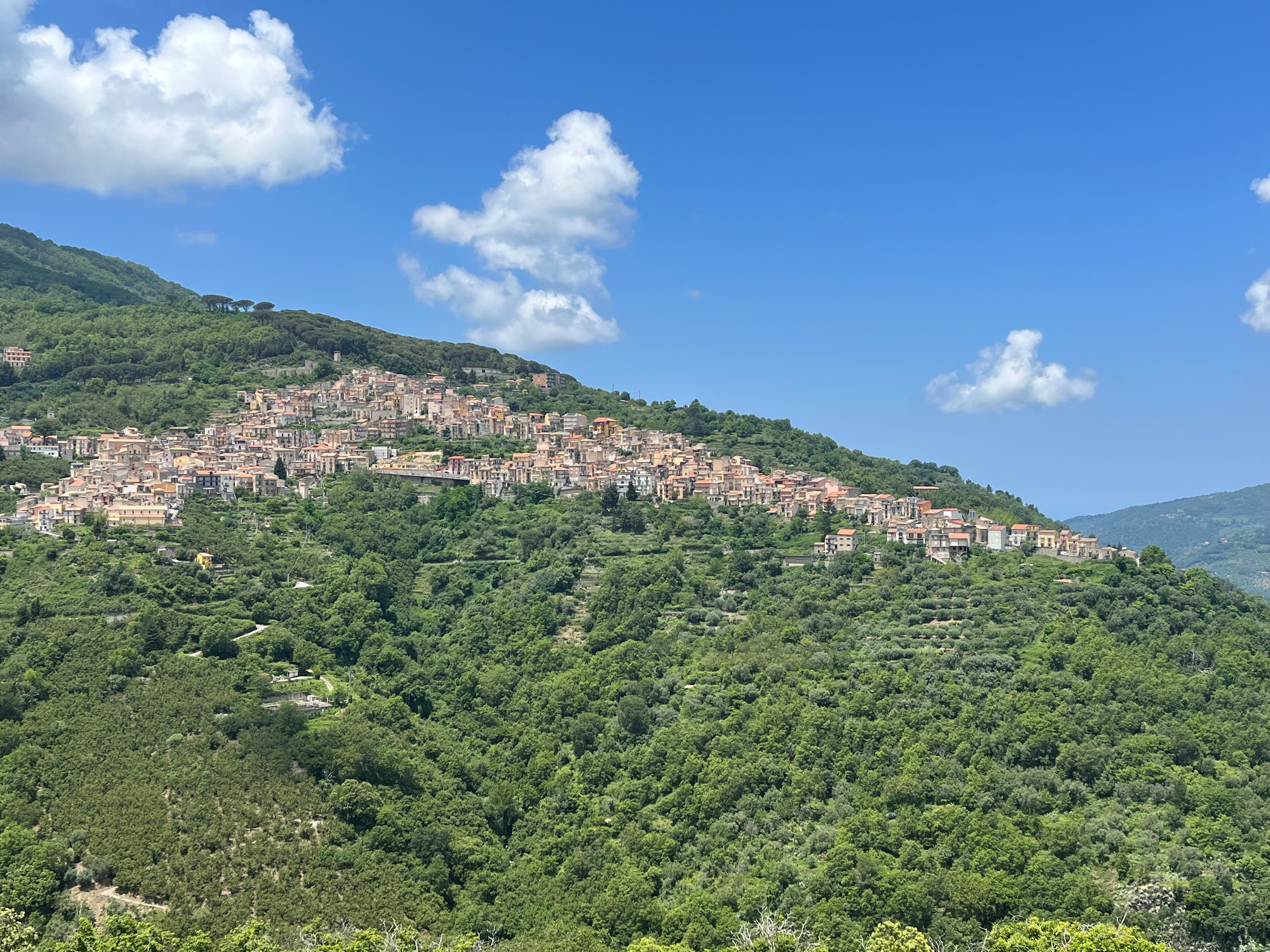

- Coat of arms

- Location within Italy Location within Sicily
- Coordinates: 38°3′N 14°53′E
- Country: Italy
- Region: Sicily
- Metropolitan city: Messina (ME)

Government
  - Mayor: Giuseppe Giovanni Lembo

Area
  - Total: 26.2 km^{2} (10.1 sq mi)
- Elevation: 710 m (2,330 ft)

Population (30 November 2013)
  - Total: 1,079
  - Density: 41.2/km^{2} (107/sq mi)
- Demonym: Ucriesi
- Time zone: UTC+1 (CET)
  - Summer (DST): UTC+2 (CEST)
- Postal code: 98060
- Dialing code: 0941
- Patron saint: S.S. Cristo della Pietà
- Saint day: May 3
- Website: Official website

Ucria is a comune (municipality) in the Metropolitan City of Messina in the Italian region Sicily, located about 130 kilometres (81 mi) east of Palermo and about 60 kilometres (37 mi) west of Messina. It is part of the Parco dei Nebrodi.

== Physical geography ==
Ucria is a small mountain town, between 710 and 790 metres (2,330 and 2,590 ft) above sea level, in the Nebrodi Mountains. It is the meeting point of three major thoroughfares: the State Road #116 (Capo d'Orlando - Randazzo), the Provincial Road #136 (San Piero Patti - Ucria), and the Provincial Road #139. The last of these passes through Sinagra on the way to the sea at Brolo. The Via Padre Bernardino (Strada Statale #116) bisects the town and provides a view of the surrounding mountains and the valley.

== History ==
Prehistoric tools, close to the Rocca di San Marco, and a storage room of Roman coins in the locality Arelluso, have been found in the area.

The origin of the town dates back to the Magna Graecia era, while the name is derived from either the Greek onchria, meaning "rust of forage", or the Arabic kerya, meaning "village". The town was annexed by Syracuse in 269 BC, until it was incorporated into the Roman Empire in 242 BC.

The two Saracen towers, one in the outskirts that was to serve as a lookout and one in the north of the town, show that the village already existed during the Islamic domination in Sicily, and that it represented a strategic location on the way to the sea. Since the year 1000, Ucria was dominated by a castle that, after the Christian conquest of the island, passed from one power to another, including the Normans, Hohenstaufen, Angevin and Aragonese. In the Norman period, Ucria was a fiefdom of Abbo Barresi.

In 1625, the Mother Church was built in Ucria and dedicated to Saint Peter the Apostle. During Norman rule, the feudal system was incorporated into the town; however, it was officially abolished with the Sicilian constitution of 1812.

Some residents of Ucria immigrated to Waltham, Massachusetts, USA in the late 19th and early 20th centuries.

== Main sights ==
=== Religious architecture ===
- Mother Church "St. Peter the Apostle"
- Church of the Virgin Mary
- Church of Our Lady of Mount Carmel
- Church of the Madonna dell' Annunziata
- Ruins of the Church of St. Maria Della Scala
- Church of Our Lady of the Rosary
- Church of St. Michael the Archangel

=== Museums ===
- Pedagogical Museum of Arts and Youth Creativity
- Typological Museum of Traditional Arts of Sicily
- Museo della Carta Pesta "Gianpistone"
- Museum of the Nebrodis ethnohistorian "Antonino Gullotti"
- Mosaic Nico Nicosia "Comparing the Two Worlds"

==== Living plant germplasm bank ====
The Germplasm Bank of Living Plants includes the adjacent Botanical Garden, dedicated to the botanist Bernardino da Ucria (1739 -1796). It houses a collection of plant species of therapeutic interest and a variety of seeds of traditional cultivars of endangered fruits. It also houses a biological laboratory working at the protection and multiplication of germplasm for the conservation of biodiversity.

== Events ==
- Festival of S.S. Christ of Pity, patron saint of Ucria, taking place on 3 May, and September 14
- The Emigrant's Day, held on August 14.
- Feast of St. Michael the Archangel, held on the last Saturday of September.
- Feast of Our Lady S.S. del Rosario, held on the last Sunday of October.
- Show and Festival of Mushroom, held on the last Sunday of October.
- Show and Festival of Hazelnuts, held in the month of September.

== People ==
- Bernardino da Ucria (1739–1796)
- Antonino Pietro Gullotti (1922–1989)
- Paolo Miraglia-Gulotti

== Twin Town ==
- Gozzano, Italy, since May 2014
