= List of Italian horse breeds =

This is a list of some of the breeds of horse considered in Italy to be wholly or partly of Italian origin. Some may have complex or obscure histories, so inclusion here does not necessarily imply that a breed is predominantly or exclusively Italian.

Horse breeding in Italy is overseen by the Ministry of Agriculture, Food Sovereignty and Forests. There is a long history of the horse in Italy.

Local name(s)	English name if used	Notes	Image
Anglo-Arabo Sardo	Sardinian Anglo-Arab		
Avelignese; Avelignese Tradizionale			
Calabrese			
Cavallino della Giara	Giara		
Cavallino di Monterufolo; Monterufolino			
Cavallo Agricolo Italiano da Tiro Pesante Rapido; TPR	Italian Heavy Draft		
Cavallo Appenninico; Appenninico			
Cavallo Bardigiano; Bardigiano			
Cavallo del Delta			
Cavallo del Ventasso; Ventasso			
Cavallo di Catria	Catria		
Cavallo Maremmano; Maremmano			
Cavallo Pentro; Pentro			
Cavallo Romano della Maremma Laziale			
Cavallo Siciliano; Siciliano Indigeno			
Pony di Esperia; Cavallino di Esperia	Esperia Pony		
Haflinger			
Lipizzano	Lipizzaner		
Murgese			
Napoletano			
Norico; Noriker			
Persano			
Purosangue Orientale			
Salernitano			
Samolaco			
Sanfratellano			
Sarcidano			
Sella Italiano			
Tolfetano			
Trottatore Italiano	Italian Trotter		
