= Sella Italiano =

Italian breed of horse

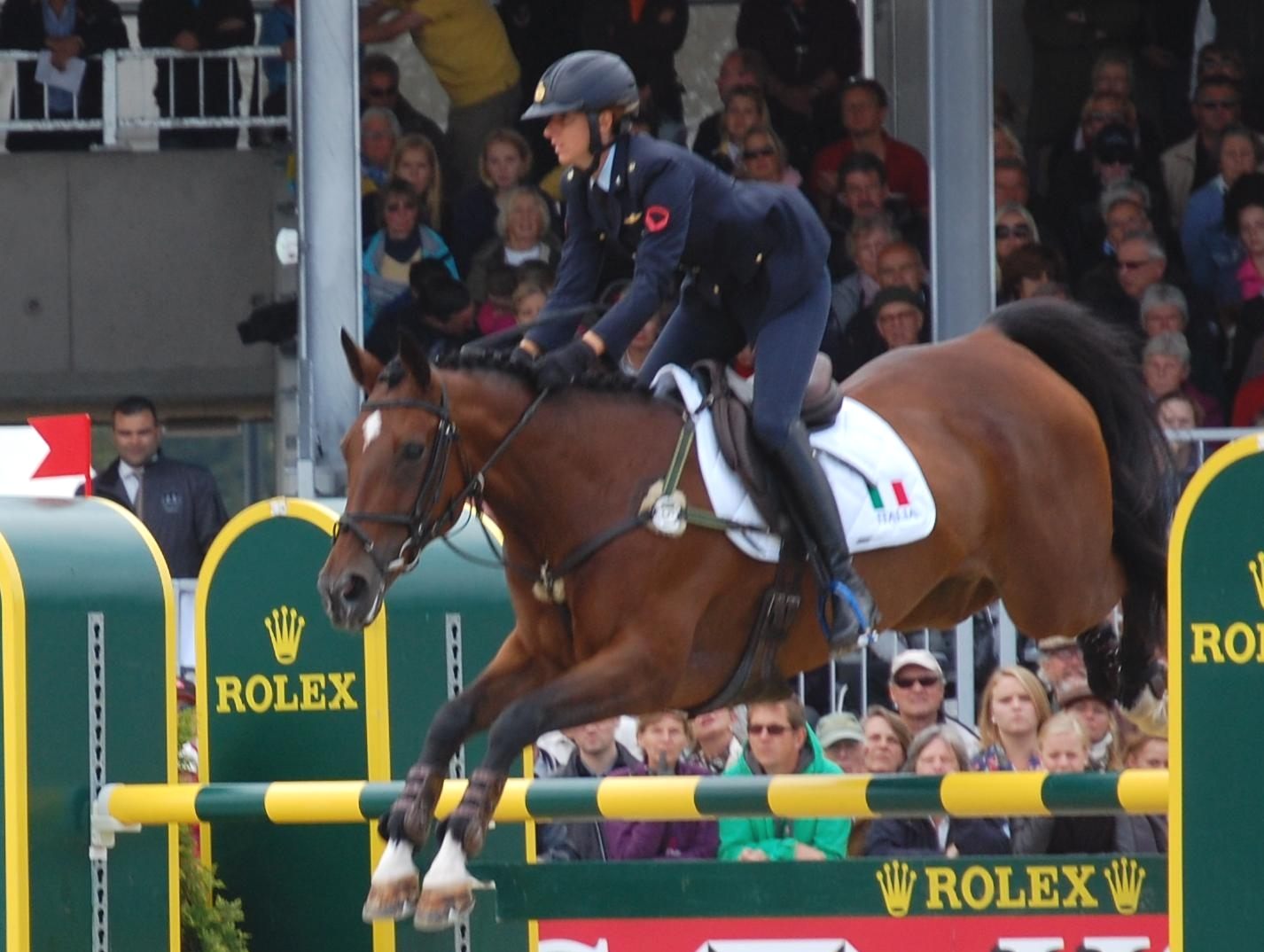

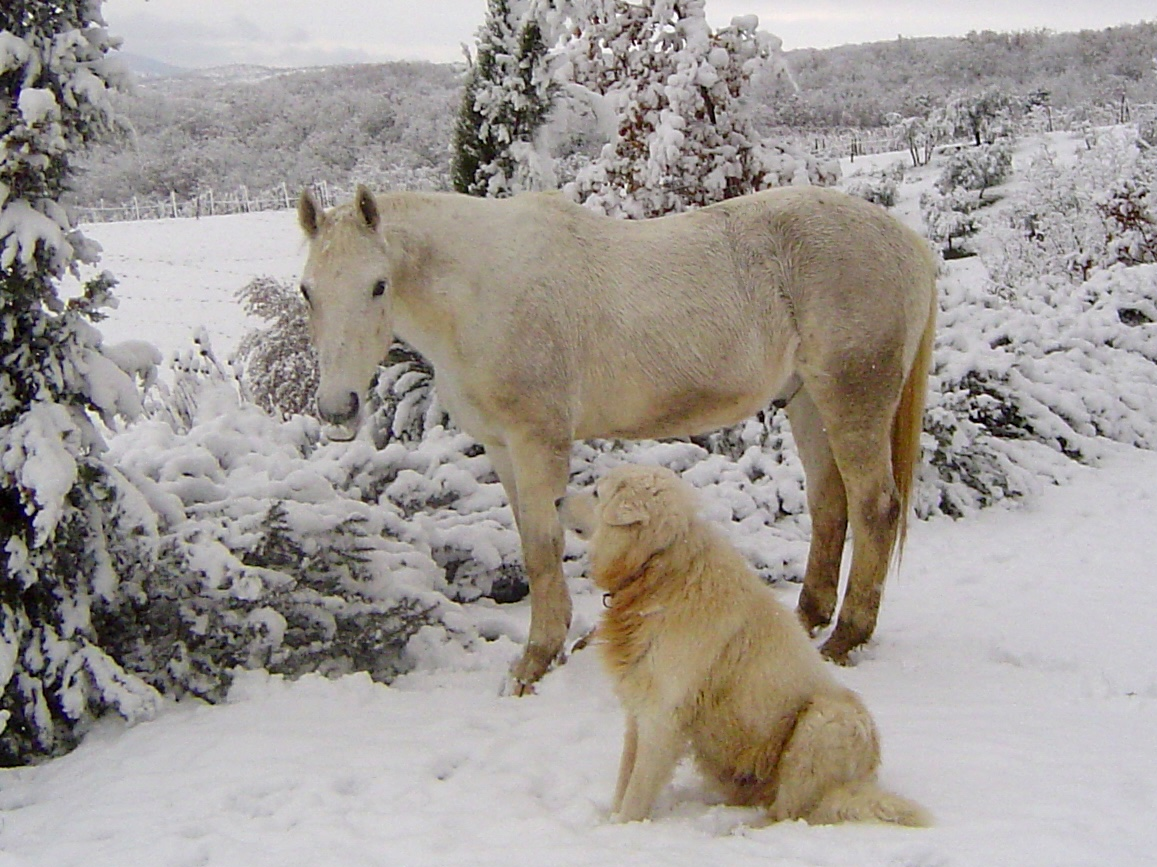
- Conservation status: FAO (2007): no data; DAD-IS (2024): not at risk
- Other names: Cavallo da Sella Italiano; Italiano da Sella
- Country of origin: Italy
- Distribution: nation-wide
- Standard: MIPAAF (in Italian)
- Use: sport horse; riding horse

Traits
- Height: minimum 156 cm (15.1 h)

The Sella Italiano is an Italian breed or stud-book of riding horse of sport horse type. It is bred to compete in showjumping, in dressage, in the three-day event and in endurance.

== History ==
The stud-book of the Sella Italiano was established by ministerial decree in 1973, one of three sections of the Libro genealogico dei cavalli di razza to be administered by the Ente Nazionale Cavallo Italiano; the other two sections were for the registration of pure-bred Oriental horses (with separate sub-sections for Arab and Purosangue Orientale animals), and of Anglo-Arab stock.

The breed blends the remnant indigenous Italian breeds of Maremmano, Salernitano and Persano horse with Anglo Arabo Sardo, Purosangue Orientale, Arabian and Thoroughbred. The progeny of these horses can be registered as Sella Italiano if they can pass a “performance test”. The stud book is open to other European warmbloods if they can pass the performance test and be approved by the breed registry. The breed is intended to produce a sport horse which can compete successfully at the international level.

== Characteristics ==
Horses standing less than 156 cm at the withers are not eligible for registration.

== Use ==
The Sella Italiano is bred as a riding horse with marked aptitude for equestrian sports, and particularly to compete in showjumping, in dressage, in the three-day event and in endurance riding.
