= Buttero =

Italian mounted livestock herder

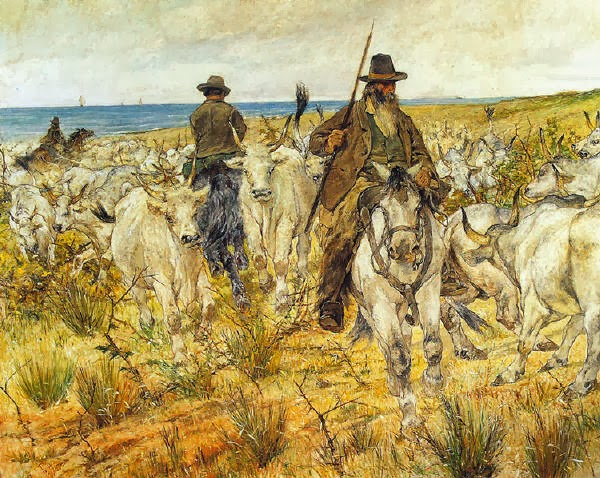
I Butteri, Giovanni Fattori (1893)

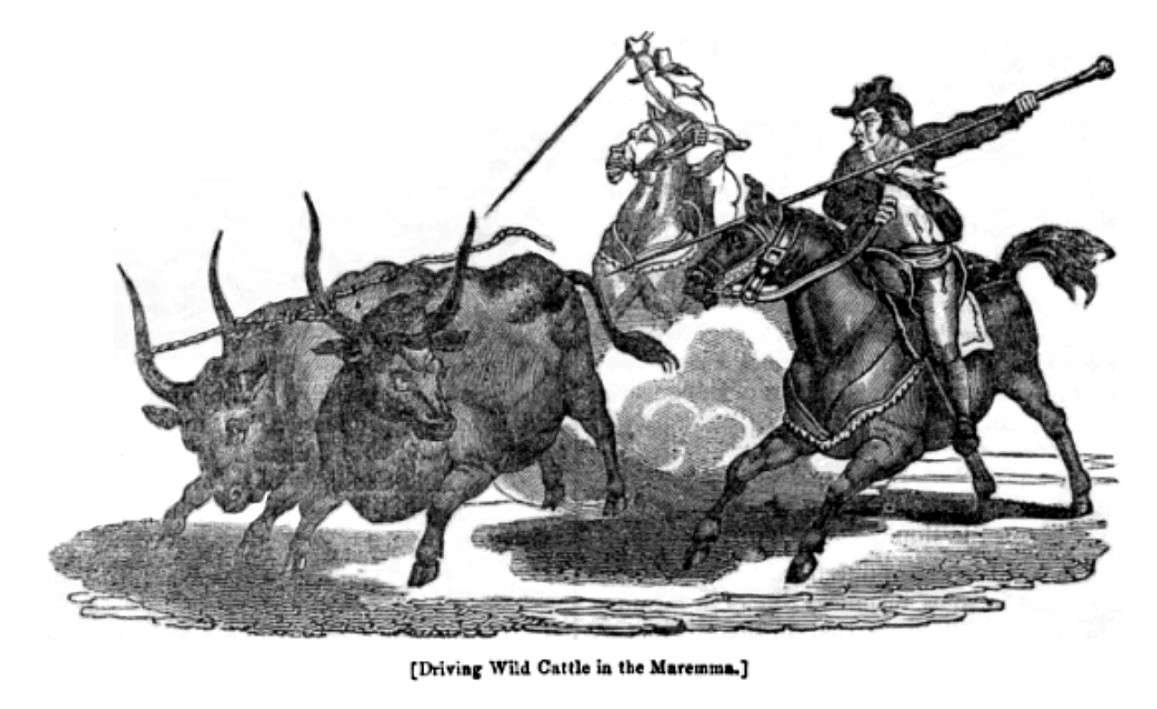
"Driving wild cattle in the Maremma", illustration from The Penny Magazine, 1832

A buttero (Italian pronunciation: [ˈbuttero], plural butteri) or cavalcante is a mounted herder, usually of horses, of cattle, or of buffaloes, in Italy, predominantly in the Maremma region, in the Roman Marshes or in the Pontine Marshes.

== History ==
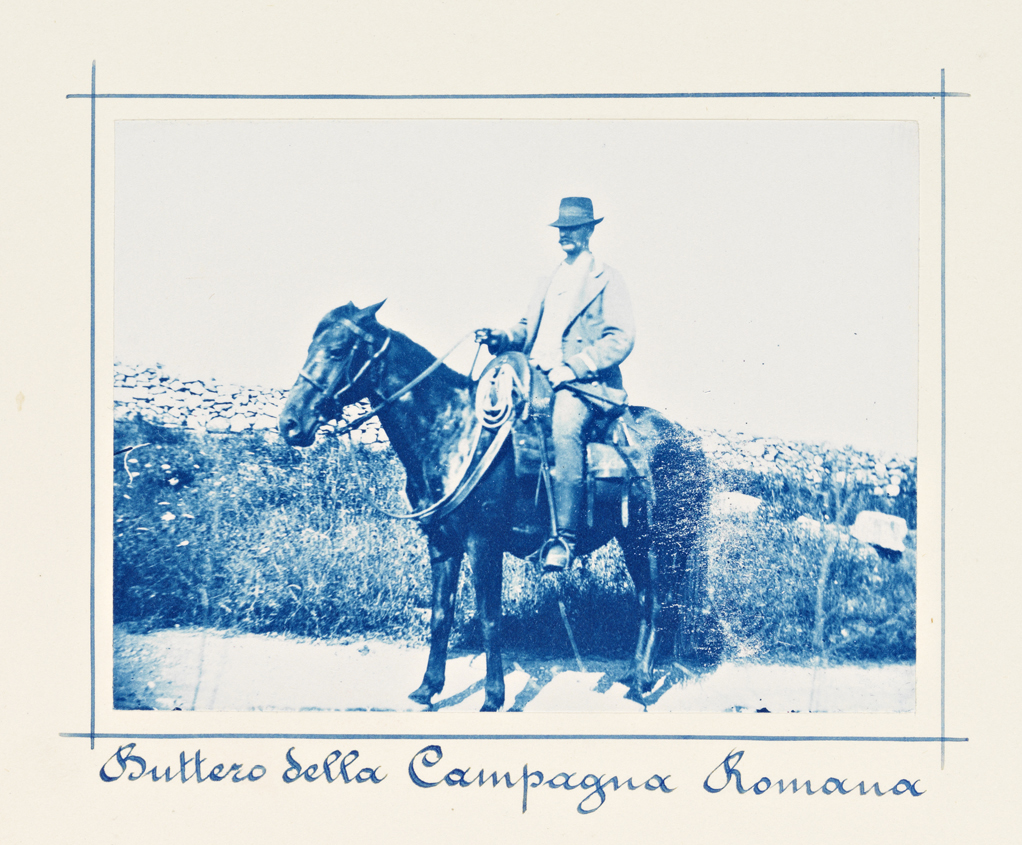
Buttero in the Campagna Romana, cyanotype from 1899

The buttero habitually rides a horse of one of the working breeds of the Maremma and the Roman Campagna – the Cavallo Romano della Maremma Laziale, the Maremmano, and the Tolfetano. He tends livestock, usually cattle (such as the native Maremmana breed), horses or buffaloes. Two saddles are in common use: the scafarda is the standard saddle in the Tuscan Maremma, while in Lazio the bardella is the saddle of choice; an older saddle, the sella col pallino, is no longer in common use. The buttero's attire consists of coarse cotton pants, leggings, a velvet jacket and a black hat. He protects himself from the rain with a large mantle called the pastràno. He carries the mazzarella, a stick employed for herding oxen and horses.

They are still present in the memory of older Tuscans and in folk celebrations. On the day of Sant'Antonio Abate (January 17) for the benediction of the animals, they parade in the centers of Tarquinia, Tuscania, Marta, and Valentano. Butteri participate in the various fetes of the merca in Alberese, Blera, Monte Romano, Tarquinia, and Tuscania. In the merca held in April at the Roccaccia, not far from Tarquinia, after having branded the young calves born in the year, the butteri compete in games of ability.

Solemn participation in various celebrations of Jesus Christ's Passion assumes particular color and vivacity in the procession of the Resurrected Christ held in Tarquinia in the late afternoon of Easter. The mounted butteri precede the statue through the crowd, firing salvoes with their maremmana shotguns.

The life of the buttero of other times was not to be envied from a qualitative point of view: the hard job in the marshes of the Maremma began before dawn, with rounding up the herds on horseback. They would take a unique meal before midday:

We made loaf with bread and chicory accompanied (but not always) from a piece of ventresca or budellone. We picked up tomatoes, chicory, potatoes and ferlenghi for the acquacotta. At dusk, after the return to the barn, the only comfort was the rapazzola , a rudimentary bed, close to the beasts. The town was sometimes visited, for the inn, to warm up themselves with the wine of the wine cellar, to discuss livestock and to tune up a song "a braccio".

== Roots in Northern Italian military history ==
The image of the military mercenary of the 14th and 15th centuries in Northern Italy (called cavalieri) riding in suits of armor wielding the mazza (mace) persists in that of the buttero. Many pastoralists of Northern Italy found better pay as mercenaries of the period, but when unemployed returned to their pastoral lifestyle. They brought back their accoutrements of battle and adapted them, whimsically, to herding.

== Current roles in Italian society ==
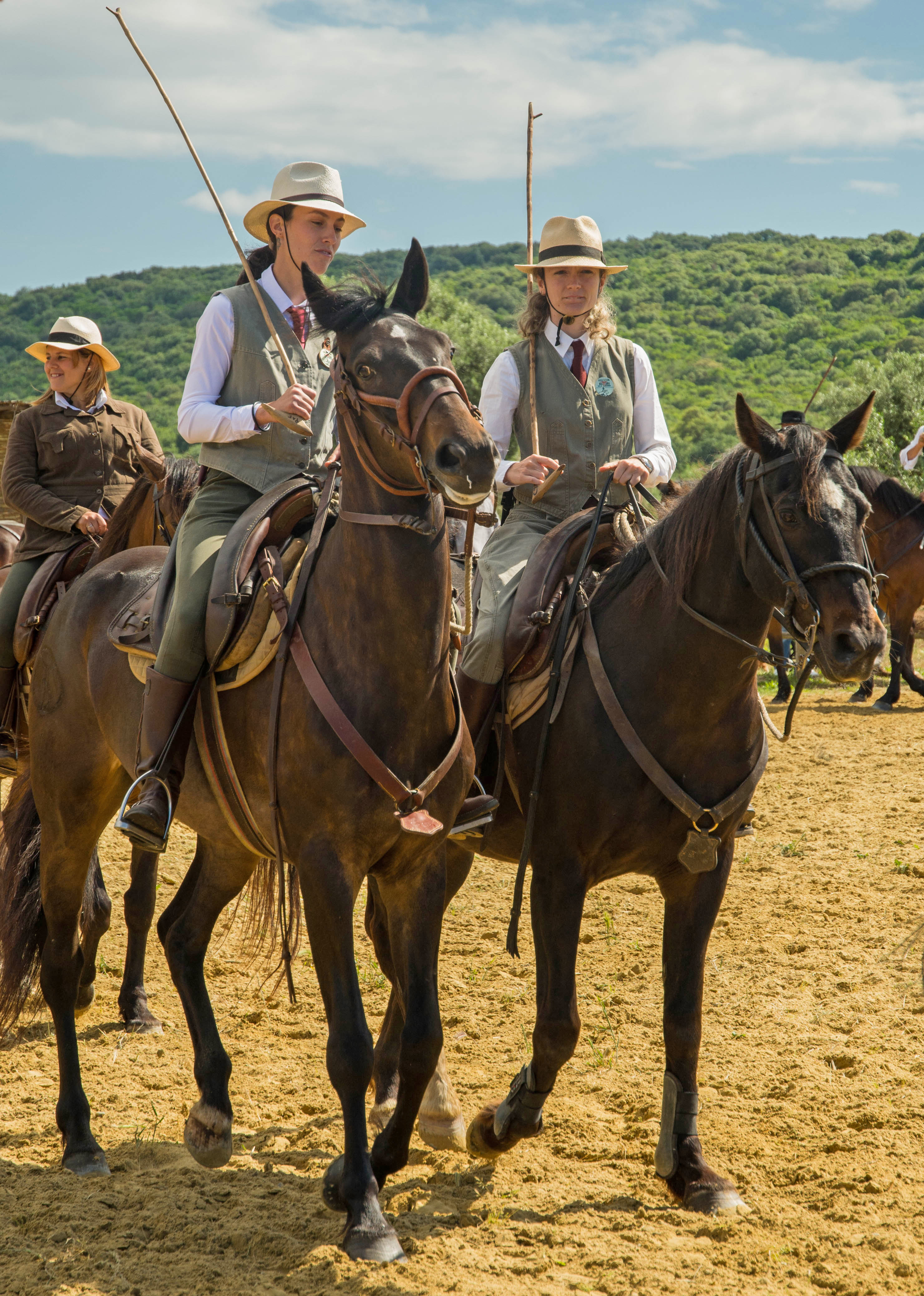
Butteri in southern Tuscany

With only five or six large herds still tended by butteri today in the unspoiled national park of Maremma (the rest of Italy's livestock largely raised by commercial concerns), the tradition of the butteri is still relived outside the park in small demonstrations in the region's rural towns and in the Italian equivalent of rodeos.

It is still possible to ride with the butteri as they check their cattle in the Parco Regionale della Maremma (Maremma regional park).

== Buffalo Bill and the butteri ==
In 1890, Buffalo Bill took his Wild West show to Rome and northern Italy (during his tour of Europe) to display cowboy skills, such as the capture of young cattle and the taming of wild horses. Unimpressed, the Italian cowboys (the butteri) led by Augusto Imperiali challenged Buffalo Bill and his show to a contest of skill. As the story is told, the butteri proved far more experienced than the Buffalo Bill troupe, and the national moment of glory for the butteri was savored for many years.

== Remembrance ==
The first Sunday in August in Tuscany still provides an annual festival to commemorate the skills of the butteri.

== Existence outside of Italy ==
Italian emigrants to California brought the tradition of the buttero with them, where they called themselves cavalcanti. They brought with them skills in rounding up large herds of cattle, usage of the lasso, and horsemanship.
