= Salernitano =

Breed of horse

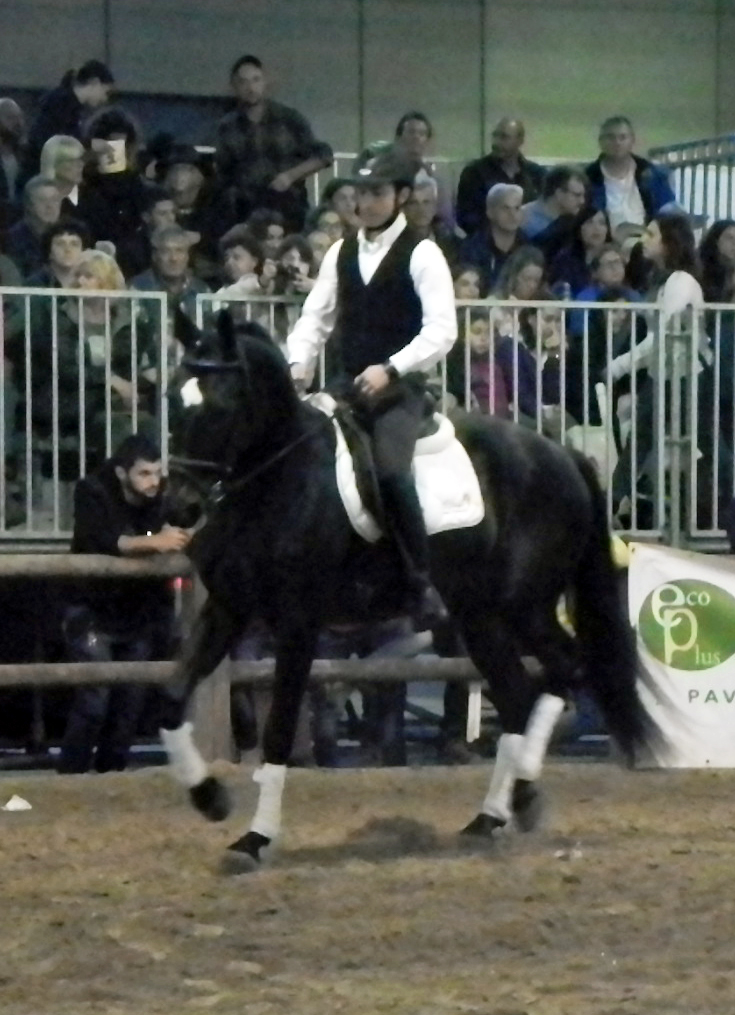
- At Fieracavalli, Verona, in 2014
- Conservation status: FAO (2007): endangered
- Other names: Salerno horse
- Country of origin: Italy
- Distribution: province of Salerno; province of Naples; province of Caserta
- Use: riding; harness; Show-jumping; sports

Traits
- Height: Male: 158 cm at 42 months; Female: 150 cm at 42 months
- Colour: bay; chestnut

Breed standards
- MIPAAF

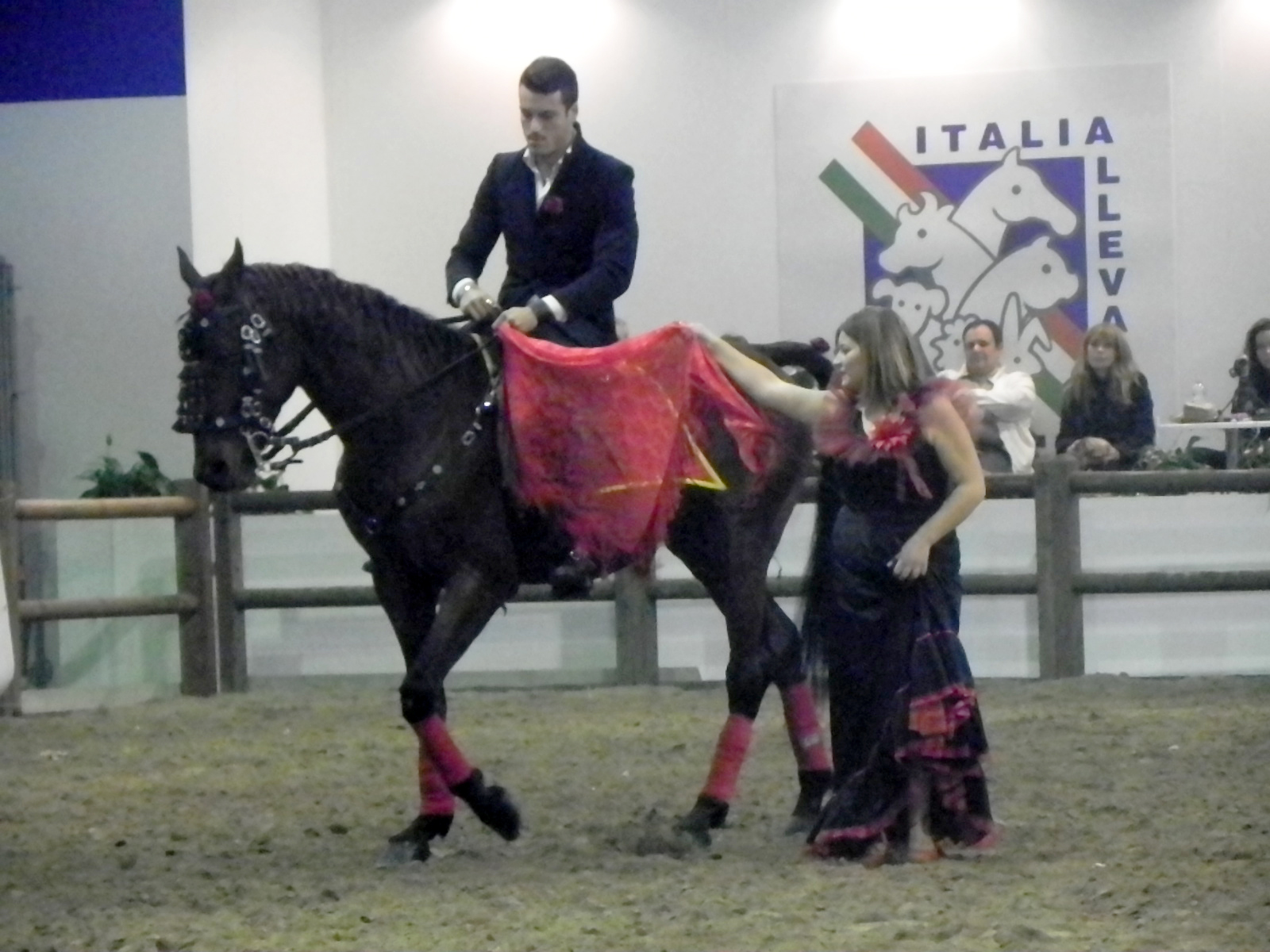
At Fieracavalli, Verona, 2014

The Salernitano is an endangered Italian breed of horse. It originates from the floodplain of the Sele river, in the province of Salerno in southern Italy. It was formerly used as a military horse, but in the twentieth century became principally a sport horse.

== History ==
The Salernitano originates in the floodplains of the Sele river in the comuni of Battipaglia, Capaccio and Eboli, in the province of Salerno in Campania in southern Italy. From the time of the Republic of Amalfi and during the crusades, the local horses of the area were influenced by Oriental blood. Under the Bourbons there were influences from Spanish horses and again from the Orient. From the early years of the nineteenth century, Thoroughbred and – to a lesser extent – Hackney blood was used to improve military aptitudes. From the 1920s the Salernitano began to be used as a sport horse, in flat racing, over jumps and in show-jumping. After the Second World War there was little demand for cavalry horses, and the breed was used mostly for sports. The Campania regional administration started a conservation programme for the breed in the 1970s. In 1990 the total number was estimated at 100. In 2007 the FAO recorded the conservation status of the breed as "endangered".

The Salernitano was formerly registered together with the Persano, which originates from much the same area and shares some of the same history. In 2015, the two breeds were recognised as separate by the Ministero delle Politiche Agricole Alimentari e Forestali, the Italian ministry of agriculture.

== Characteristics ==
The usual coat colour is bay; chestnut, grey and black are also accepted.

== Use ==
The Salernitano is suitable for use as a riding horse, as a harness horse, for equestrian touring and horse-trekking, and for sports, particularly show-jumping.
