= Antonio Giarola =

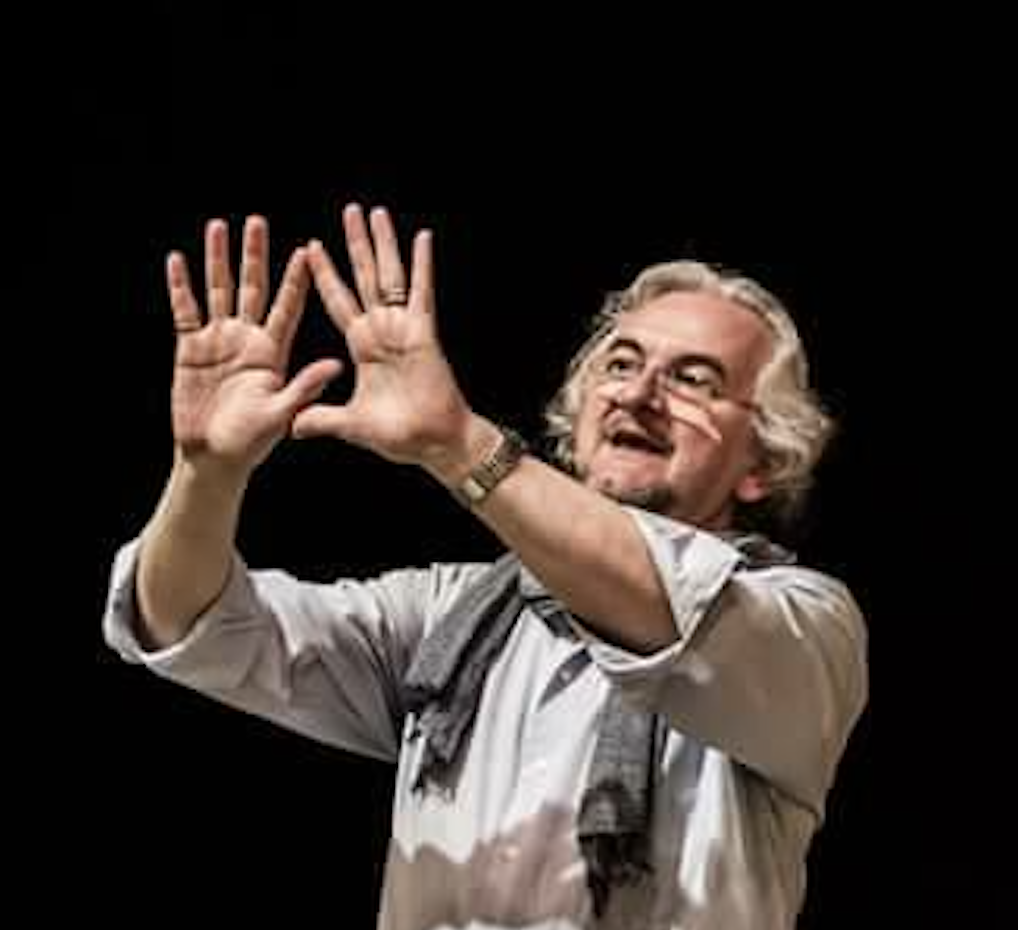
- Born: 1957; Legnago
- Occupations: Theater Director, Circus Historian, Poet

Antonio Giarola born in 1957, is an Italian poet, circus and theater director and circus historian.

== Biography ==
Graduated in Dramaturgy at the University of Literature and Philosophy in Bologna, Italy, he began his career at the Teatro Laboratorio in Verona in the early 1980s as an assistant to Ezio Maria Caserta. In 1984 he created his own circus, the Clown's Circus. which constitutes the first example of Theatrical Direction applied to the Classical Circus in the history of the Italian Circus

He was one of the founders of the Accademia d'Arte Circense in Verona (1988), where he taught Circus History (1988–1989). He directed the City of Verona International Circus Festival (1992–1994). From 2009 to 2011 he was artistic director of the Salieri Opera Festival in Legnago. He is currently President of the National Association for the Development of Circus Arts (ANSAC) and of the Circus Arts Documentation Educational Center (CEDAC) in Verona. As a Circus Historian, he is the author of various publications and represents the World Circus Federation with conferences in Europe, China and Canada, he also participated as a speaker at the La Biennale di Venezia convention with David Larible. As a Poet, Historian and Journalist, he has made several publications. He was a member of the Circuses and Traveling Shows Commission at the Italian Ministry of Cultural Activities (1996–2002). He also is the artistic director of The International Salieri Circus Festival, which intends to be the unique competitive festival on the national and international scene presenting a competition of circus numbers with classical music as soundtrack.

In 2021 he created the International Salieri Circus Award, the first competitive circus festival in theater with classical and art music, of which he is also the artistic director.

=== Circus direction ===
- Il Circo, Una Festa, Clown's Circus, Italy, 1984
- Il Circo in Arena, Il Florilegio di Darix Togni, Verona, Italy, 1991–1998
- Omaggio a Federico, Antico Circo Orfei, Rome, Italie, directed with Ambra Orfei, 1994
- Bellissimo, Hermann Renz, Netherlands 2007
- Carnevale, Circus Nikulin, Moscow, Russia, 2015
- Veneziano, Circus Nikulin, Izhevsk, Russia, 2016
- Hi-Ten Show, Hi-Ten Circus, Sanya, China, directed with Joseph Bouglione, 2016
- Hi-Ten Show, Hi-Ten Circus, Lijiang, China, 2016
- Venice Tribute, Hi-Ten Circus, Beijing, China, 2018
- Fantastika, Cirque Nikulin, Moscow, Russia, 2020

=== Theatrical direction ===
- Ringraziamento all'Arte ch'io professo, Lyrics and Music by Antonio Salieri, Salieri Opera Festival, Legnago, Verona, 2009–2011
- Varietas Delectat, RBR Dance Company, tournées in Italy and in Saint Petersburg, Russia, 2009-2012
- Il Circo di Zeus - RBR Dance Company, tournées in Italy, 2015
- Bianco, with choreography by Elena Grossule, Verona, 2025

=== Equestrian theater direction ===
- Zlatne Grive, Arena, Pula, Croatia, 1988–1989
- La Briglia D'Oro, Fieracavalli, Verona, 1991
- Rêve, an Equestrian Dream, Bobbejaanland, Belgium, 2009
- Horse Music, Nuit du Cheval, Paris, 2013
- Visions, Fieracavalli, Verona, 2014
- Horse Dance, Nuit du Cheval, Paris
- White. Un Viaggio nel Colore dei Nostri Sogni, with choreography by Elena Grossule, Equestrian Theater, 2014–2016
- Anniversary, Fieracavalli, Verona, 2018
- Rêve, Salon du Cheval d'El Jadida, Morocco, 2019
- Dreams, Fieracavalli, Verona, 2019
- Horse Dreaming, Equestrian Theater, Qingdao, China, directed with Mario Luraschi, 2019
- Chakras, with choreography by Elena Grossule - Teatro Tenda Villa Giona, Italia, 2022
- Sable, Salon du Cheval d'El Jadida, Morocco, 2022
- Meraviglia, Fieracavalli, Verona, 2022
- Marocco, Land of colors - Salon du Cheval d'El Jadida, El Jadida, Marocco, 2023
- Arte, Gala d'Oro – Fieracavalli, Verona, 2023
- Pathos, Gala d'Oro – Fieracavalli, Verona, 2024
- Bellezza, Gala d'Oro – Fieracavalli, Verona, 2025

== Publications ==
=== Essays ===
- Circo Classico e Nuovo Circo in Italia e all'estero, publisher La Biennale di Venezia - Musicateatrodanza n.4, 2000
- Il Circo Contemporaneo: Alla Ricerca di Una Nuova Identità, en Aa.Vv., Il Circo e La Scena. Forme Dello Spettacolo Contemporaneo, Edizioni La Biennale di Venezia 2001
- CEDAC – Documenti e Attività 2003-2006, publisher ANSAC-CEDAC, 2006
- CEDAC – Documenti e Attività 2007-2008, publisher ANSAC-CEDAC, 2008
- CEDAC – Documenti e Attività 2009-2010, publisher Equilibrando, 2010 ISBN 978-88-95424-01-9
- CEDAC – Documenti e Attività 2011-2012, publisher Equilibrando, 2012 ISBN 978-88-95424-03-3
- Corpo Animali Meraviglie. Le Arti Circensi a Verona tra Sette e Novecento, publisher Equilibrando, 2013 ISBN 978-88-95424-05-7
- CEDAC – Documenti e Attività 2013-2014, publisher Equilibrando, 2014 ISBN 978-88-95424-09-5
- CEDAC – Documenti e Attività 2015-2016, publisher Equilibrando, 2016 ISBN 978-88-95424-06-4
- CEDAC – Documenti e Attività 2017-2020, publisher Equilibrando, 2020 ISBN 978-88-95424-10-1
- Il pericolo è il mio mestiere! in Il circo e la scena : forme dello spettacolo contemporaneo, publisher La Biennale di Venezia, 2001 ISBN 8831777890
- Il cavallo in scena, Edizioni Equilibrando, 2025, ISBN 978-88-95424-26-2

=== Poems ===
- Simbiosi, Edizioni MG, 1978
- Poesie (1972-1989), Edizioni MG, 1989
- Carnaval, (photo by Marco Bertin), Giunti Editore, Florence, 1995
- Fiabe, Edizioni del Leone, 1998
- Masquerade (photo by Marco Bertin) publisher Edel Classics, Hambourg, 2005 ISBN 3-937406-33-6
- Il Circo Classico, publisher Equilibrando, 2007, ISBN 978-88-95424-00-2
- White. Un Viaggio nel Colore dei Nostri Sogni, publisher Equilibrando, 2014 ISBN 978-88-95424-08-8
- Il Circo, Una Festa: poesie, publisher Equilibrando, 2019 ISBN 978-88-95424-31-6
- L'Uscio che canta (il nulla si fa parola), Edizioni Equilibrando, 2022 ISBN 978 88 95424 20 0

=== Translations ===
- Antinoo, Epigrammi d’Amore, (translation from Greek to Italian), publisher Equilibrando, 2012 ISBN 978-88-95424-04-0
- Gustavo Bernstein, Esercizi di Fede, (translation from Spanish to Italian), publisher Equilibrando, 2018 ISBN 978-88-95424-15-6

== Bibliography ==
- F. Cappa; P. Gelli (1998). Dizionario dello Spettacolo del '900. Baldini&Castoldi. ISBN 978-88-80892-95-3.
- Fabio Marino (2010). Ringraziamento all'Arte ch'io professo. Fondazione Culturale Antonio Salieri. ISBN 978-88-96930-08-3.
