= Fratello =

Fratello may refer to:

People:

- Fratello Metallo ("Brother Metal"), a name given to Cesare Bonizzi (born 1946), Capuchin friar and heavy metal singer
- Jose Luis Fratello (born 1987), the top lieutenant of the Mexican gang called La Línea, the armed wing of the Juárez Cartel
- Mike Fratello (born 1947), American color analyst and a professional basketball coach
- Rosanna Fratello (born 1951), Italian singer and actress

Other:

- Grande Fratello, the Italian version of reality television franchise Big Brother, began in September 2000
- San Fratello, a comune in the Province of Messina in the Italian region of Sicily
- San Fratello horse, an Italian light horse breed that originated in San Fratello, Sicily
