= Catria =

Catria may refer to:

- Catria, playable character and one of the Whitewing Sisters from Fire Emblem: Shadow Dragon.
- Monte Catria, the mountain located in central Apennines in Italy.
- Catria horse, the Italian breed of horse from Monte Catria.
