= Purosangue =

Purosangue may refer to:

- Purosangue Orientale, an Italian horse breed
- Ferrari Purosangue, an Italian sports SUV
