= Tolfetano =

Breed of horse

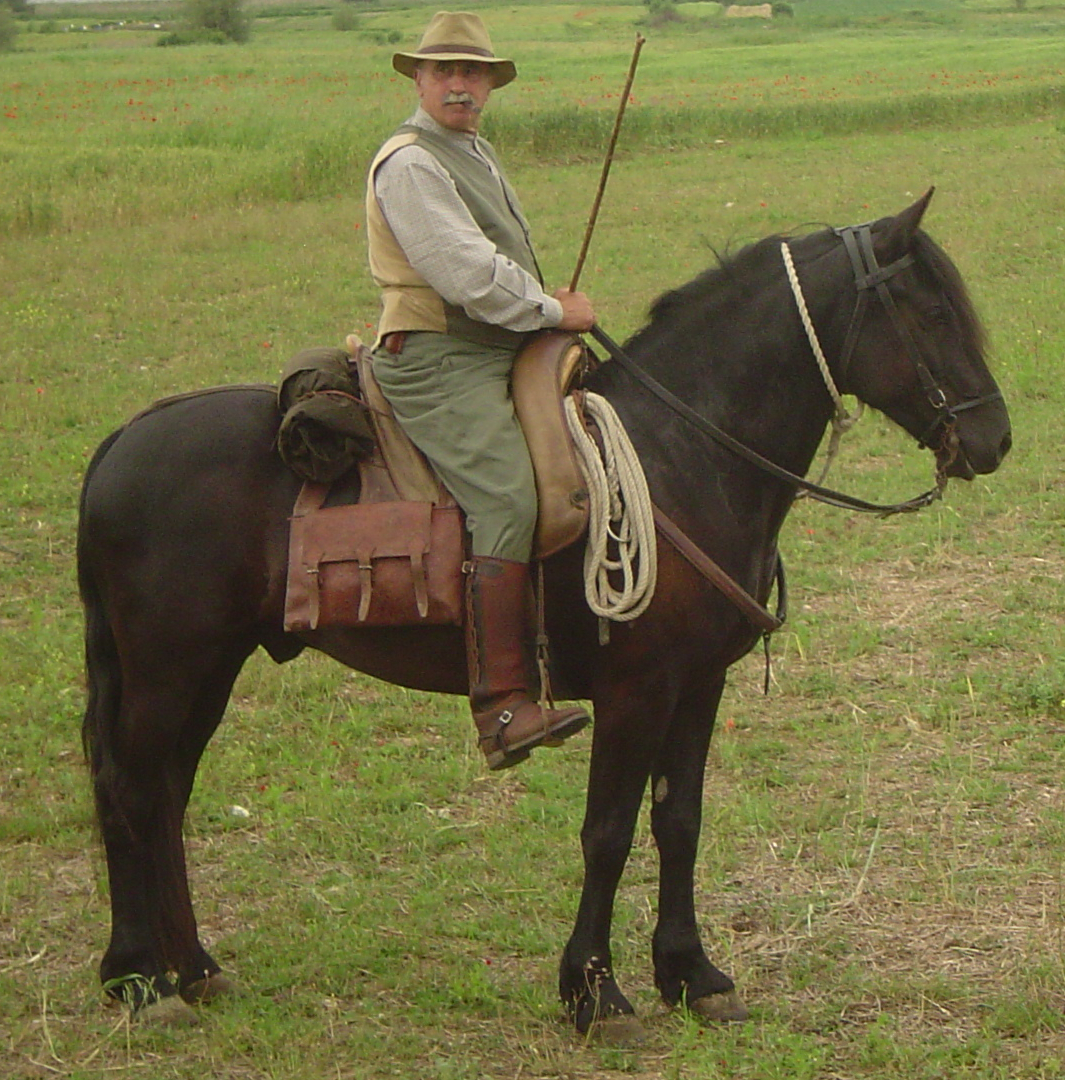
- A working Tolfetano carrying his breeder
- Country of origin: Italy, native to Lazio

Breed standards
- Associazione Italiana Allevatori

The Tolfetano or Cavallo Tolfetano is a breed of horse from the northern part of the Lazio region of Italy. It is indigenous to the Monti della Tolfa range of hills which lie within the Maremma Laziale, and which give the breed its name. The harsh terrain and limited resources of the area are thought to have contributed to the resistant and frugal nature of the breed.

The Tolfetano is one of the fifteen indigenous horse "breeds of limited distribution" recognised by the AIA, the Italian breeders' association. At the end of 2008 it was present in 15 Italian provinces, with a total registered population of 1085.

== History ==
The horse is thought to represent the original version of the better known "Maremmano", before the introduction of Thoroughbred blood in the Maremmano breed.

According to some the Tolfetano derives from Mongolian horses that found their way into Italy following the hordes of Bulgarian invaders who accompanied the Lombards in their conquest of the northern half of Italy. According to others it originated as a mixture of indigenous horses, barb horses and Spanish horses.

Whatever the origin the Tolfetano of today is a working horse, the favorite mounts of the local cowboys (called "Butteri" in Italian) in the "Maremma Laziale".

== Characteristics ==
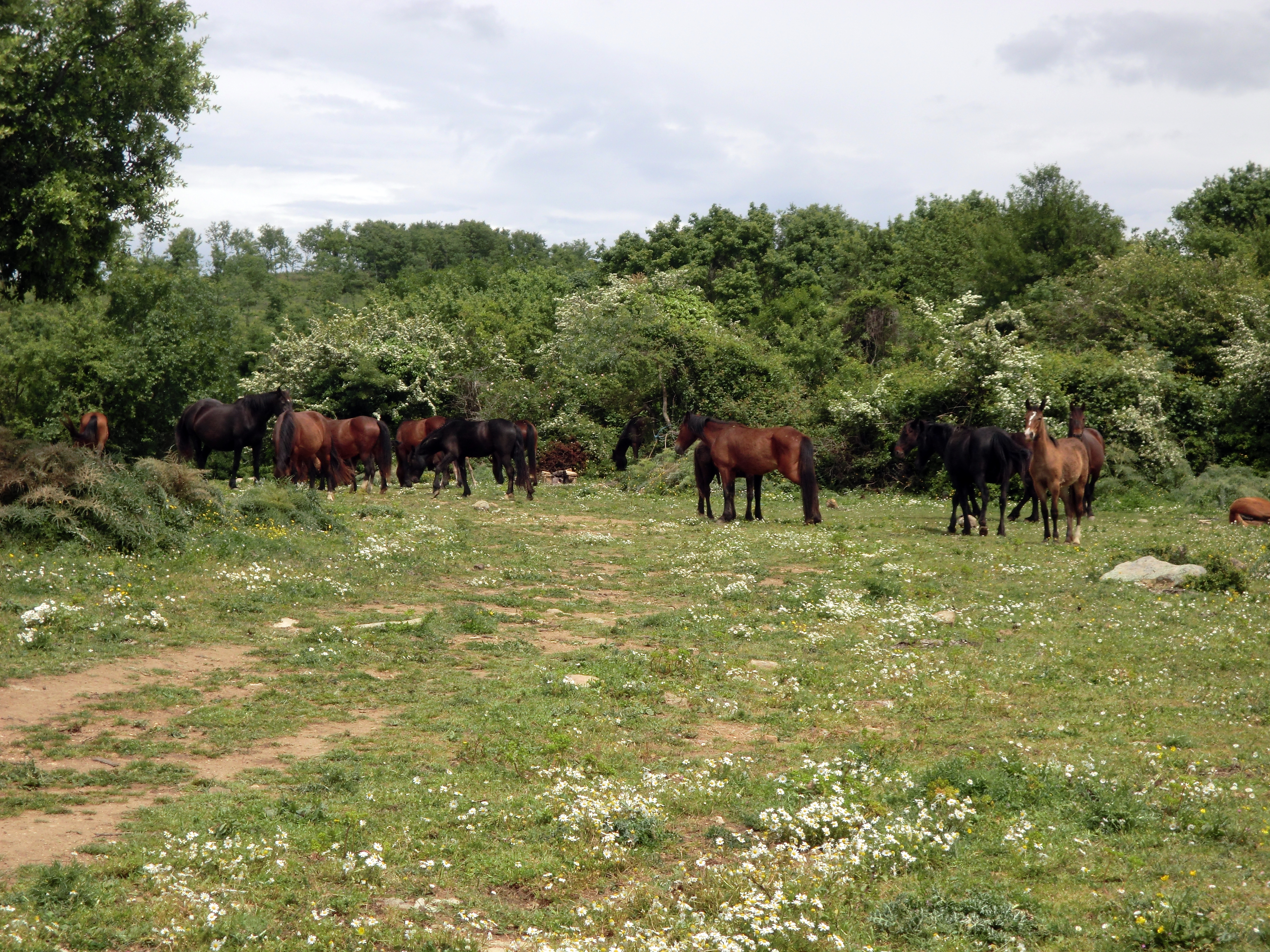
Tolfetano horses pasturing near Mount Tolfaccia

The Tolfetano's physique is stockier than its Maremmano cousin and is well-suited to carry weight. Most Tolfetanos stand 145 centimetres (14.1 hands) to 158 centimetres (15.2 hands) and have a cannon bone circumference of 20 centimetres (7.9 in).

== See also ==
- Cavallo Romano della Maremma Laziale
- Maremmano
