= Ventasso horse =

Breed of horse

- Other names: Cavallo del Ventasso
- Country of origin: Italy

Traits
- Height: 150-164 cm

Breed standards
- Associzione Italiana Allevatori

The Ventasso horse (Italian: Cavallo del Ventasso) is a rare breed of horse originating from the upper Val d'Enza valley in the Emilia-Romagna region of Italy. From the 1800s until the 1940s the military procured horses from this region. The Ventasso horse breed was formed in the 1960s through the crossing of a Lipizzaner stallion with Maremmano mares. It is one of several indigenous horse breeds of "limited distribution" recognised by the AIA, the Italian Breeders Association, and takes its name from the mountain Monte Ventasso.

The Ventasso has a straight profile and a muscular, medium-length neck. The shoulder is sloping and the back compact. Acceptable colors are bay, chestnut, grey, and black. Spotted colorations and excess white socks are disqualifying faults.

== See also ==
- List of Italian horse breeds
