= Italian Trotter =

Italian breed of horse

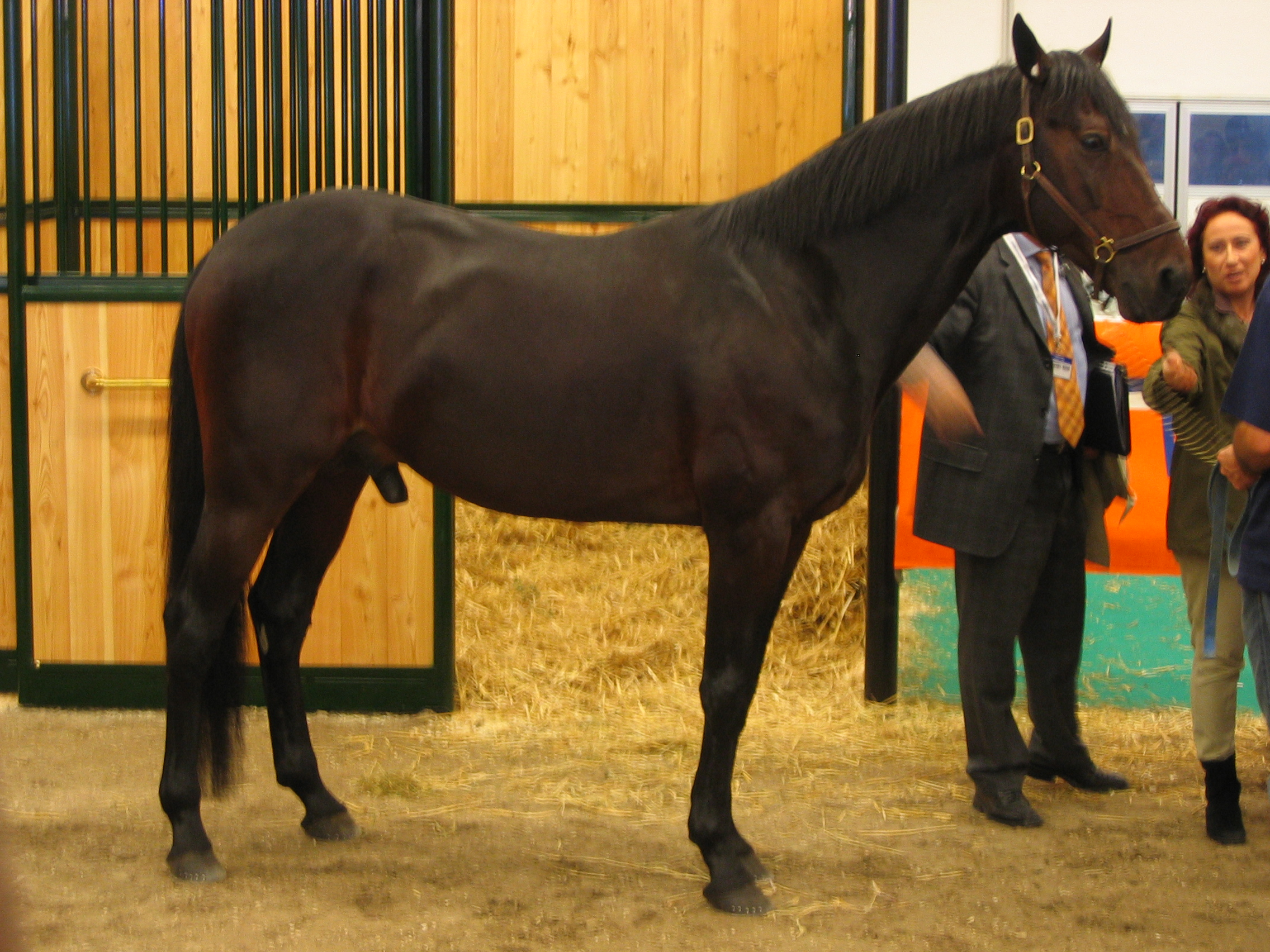
- Varenne at Fieracavalli, Verona, in 2004
- Conservation status: FAO (2007): not at risk
- Other names: Trottatore Italiano
- Country of origin: Italy
- Distribution: nationwide, but particularly: Campania; Emilia Romagna; Lombardy; Tuscany; the Veneto
- Use: trotting races

Traits
- Height: 145–160 cm
- Colour: any

The Italian Trotter, Italian: Trottatore Italiano, is the Italian breed of trotting horse. It has been selectively bred exclusively for its racing ability. Varenne, one of the most successful trotters in the history of the sport, was an Italian Trotter.

== History ==
The Italian Trotter has been influenced by the French Trotter, the Russian Orlov Trotter and the American Standardbred. The move in recent years towards races over shorter distances has led to greater reliance on horses of the American type.

The first trotting races in the Italian peninsula were held in the Prato della Valle of Padua (which at that time was in the Napoleonic Kingdom of Italy) from 1808, some two years after the earliest official races at New Haven, Connecticut, in the United States. Selection of the Italian Trotter did not begin until the second half of the nineteenth century, when mares with aptitude for trotting were put to English Thoroughbred stallions. The first notable Italian trotting horse was Vandalo, foaled in Ferrara in 1862. A genealogical stud-book was started in 1896. The stud-book is closed – only horses born to registered parents can be registered; however, trotters registered elsewhere can sometimes be admitted if their racing record is exceptional.

The most celebrated Italian Trotter is Varenne, foaled in 1995, who raced in seven countries, won 61 of his 73 races, and whose winnings of over €6 million are thought to be a record.

== Characteristics ==
There is no breed standard or morphological requirement of any kind. The most common coat colours are bay, chestnut and black. Heights at the withers usually lie between 145 and 160 cm.

== Use ==
The Italian Trotter has been selectively bred exclusively for its racing ability, particularly over short (1600–1660 m) and medium (2060–2100 m) distances; races over longer distances are no longer common in Italy.
