= Sanfratellano =

Italian breed of horse

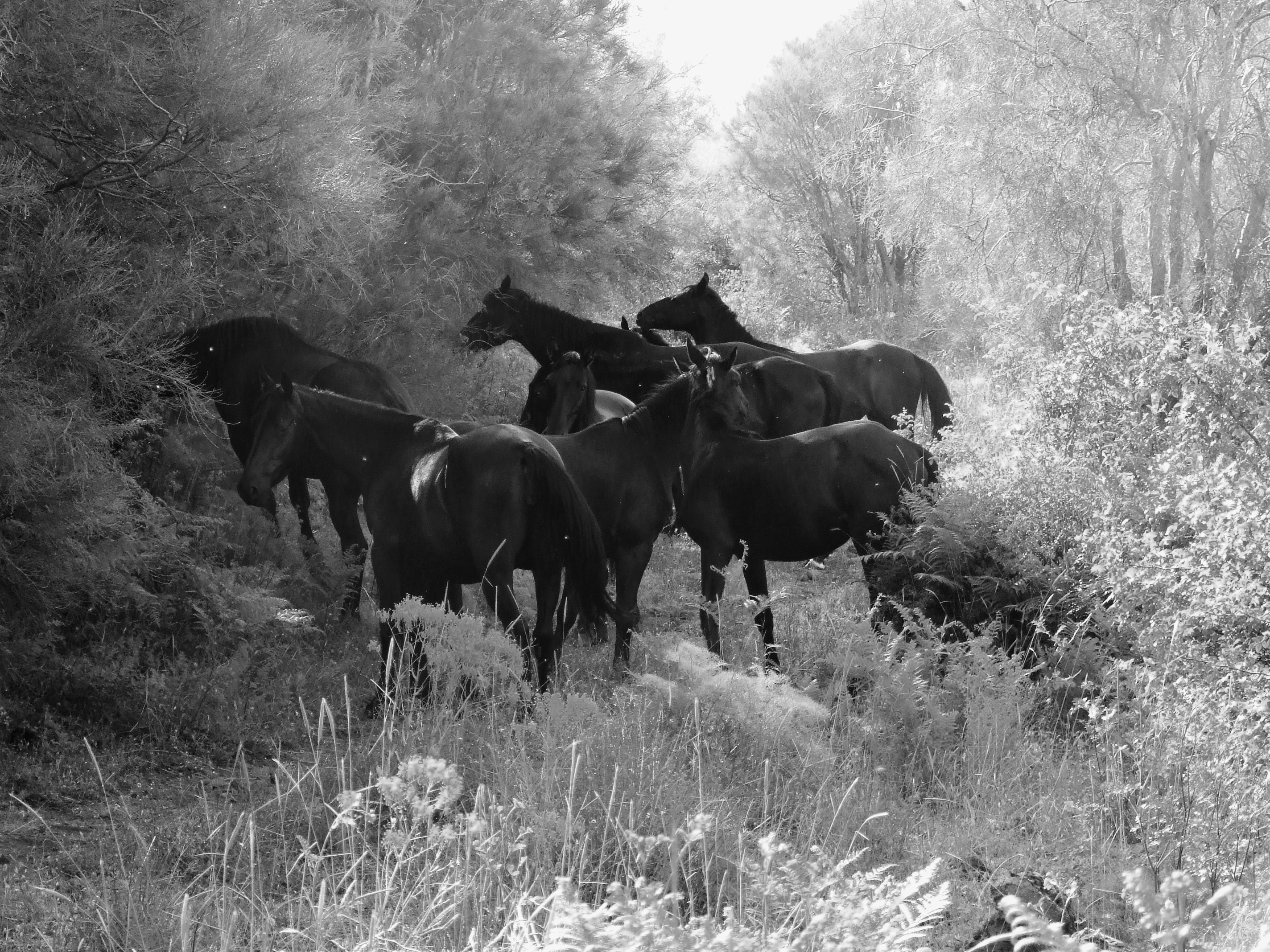
- Other names: Cavallo Sanfratellano; Razza di San Fratello
- Country of origin: Italy
- Distribution: Sicily
- Standard: Associazione Nazionale Allevatori Cavallo Sanfratellano
- Use: riding; harness; agricultural; meat

Traits
- Height: Male: 152 cm; Female: 150 cm
- Colour: bay, dark bay or black

The Sanfratellano or Razza di San Fratello is an Italian breed of riding horse. It originates in the comune of San Fratello, in the Nebrodi Mountains in the province of Messina in north-eastern Sicily. It is one of three Sicilian breeds, the others being the Purosangue Orientale and the Siciliano Indigeno.

== History ==
The history of Sicily over the three millennia preceding the Unification of Italy in 1861 is one of repeated conquest and strife, with many different peoples and powers achieving total or partial dominance over the island for a time. These have included the Phoenicians, Greeks, Carthaginians, Romans, Vandals, Ostrogoths, Byzantines, Muslim North Africans, Lombards, Normans, Swabians, Angevins, Catalan-Aragonese, Spanish and Bourbons. It is likely that many of these invaders brought horses with them – from the Middle East, from North Africa, from the Iberian Peninsula and from Northern Europe. The Muslims who were present in the island from 827 to 1091 brought very large numbers of horses of Oriental type, while the Lombards brought heavy war-horses and the Spanish brought Iberian stock.

The Sanfratellano is named for, and is believed to have originated in, the comune of San Fratello, in the Nebrodi Mountains in the province of Messina in north-eastern Sicily. The town is believed to have been founded by the Lombards in the eleventh century; a Gallo-Italic dialect with Lombard influences is still spoken there.

The modern history of the Sanfratellano began in 1864 with the establishment of a Deposito Stalloni or military stud at Catania; this later became an Istituto di Incremento Ippico or horse-breeding institute. Breeding records for this period were lost during the First World War. In 1925 the area of San Fratello and of the nearby towns of Caronia and Mistretta was important for its horse-breeding, with a number of the principal stud-farms. At this time a number of private breeders in Sicily were putting their good local mares to Arab and Anglo-Arab stallions to produce horses with better speed, size and conformation, and were able to sell many of these to the state studs or as military mounts.

In the twentieth century Maremmano stallions were much used to cover Sanfratellano mares. From 1935 four stallions of English origin and one of Oriental type also stood at stud. Five Nonius stallions were imported from Hungary in 1959, and remained in use for ten years. Further use was then made of Maremmano stallions, some of which were by this time significantly influenced by cross-breeding with Thoroughbred stock.

A breed society, the Associazione Nazionale Allevatori Cavallo Sanfratellano, was formed in 1996.

The Sanfratellano is bred principally in the Parco dei Nebrodi, not only in the comune of San Fratello but also in Alcara Li Fusi, Capizzi, Caronia, Castell'Umberto, Cesarò, Floresta, Galati Mamertino, Longi, Militello Rosmarino, Tortorici and Ucria. Its conservation status was listed by the Food and Agriculture Organization of the United Nations in 2007 as 'endangered'; in 2024 it was listed in DAD-IS as 'at risk/endangered'. A breed census in 2022 found the population to be 'stable' at 1494 head, including 973 brood mares and 260 stallions.

== Characteristics ==
The Sanfratellano is compact and robust, somewhat longer in the body than it is tall. Average height at the withers is 150 cm for mares, 152 cm for males; average chest circumferences are 173 cm and 175 cm respectively, while the average cannon bone circumference is 19 cm in both sexes. The facial profile is straight or slightly convex. The coat may be bay, dark bay or black, preferably without white markings: a few white hairs on the face may be tolerated, but white socks are a disqualifying defect.

The horses are rustic, well able to forage for themselves, and well adapted to survival in the open, to the cold of the Sicilian winter and to the intense heat of summer.

== Use ==
The Sanfratellano is used as a riding horse, as a harness horse, for agricultural work, for meat and for the production of mules. Approximately half of all Italian mules are bred in Sicily.

The horses are usually managed extensively, living in large semi-feral herds in the forests of the Nebrodi, grazing on the undergrowth or on patches of pasture land.
