= Siciliano Indigeno =

Italian breed of horse

- Conservation status: FAO (2007): not at risk; DAD-IS (2024): at risk/critical
- Other names: Cavallo Siciliano; Sicilian
- Country of origin: Italy
- Distribution: Sicily
- Standard: Istituto Incremento Ippico per la Sicilia

Traits
- Height: Male: 153–165 cm; average 159 cm; Female: 152–163 cm; average 157 cm
- Colour: bay, black, chestnut, grey

The Siciliano Indigeno or Cavallo Siciliano is an Italian breed of light riding horse native to the Mediterranean island of Sicily in southern Italy. It derives from cross-breeding of local mares with stallions of Oriental and North African type. In the twentieth century there was substantial intromission of Thoroughbred and Anglo-Arab blood, resulting in a marked increase in average height.

It was officially recognised as a breed in 2024. It is one of three Sicilian horse breeds, the others being the Purosangue Orientale and the Sanfratellano.

== History ==
The history of Sicily over the three millennia preceding the Unification of Italy in 1861 is one of repeated conquest and strife, with many different peoples and powers achieving total or partial dominance over the island for a time. These have included the Phoenicians, Greeks, Carthaginians, Romans, Vandals, Ostrogoths, Byzantines, Muslim North Africans, Lombards, Normans, Swabians, Angevins, Catalan-Aragonese, Spanish and Bourbons. It is likely that many of these invaders brought horses with them – from the Middle East, from North Africa, from the Iberian Peninsula and from Northern Europe. The Muslims who were present in the island from 827 to 1091 brought very large numbers of horses of Oriental type, while the Lombards brought heavy war-horses and the Spanish brought Iberian stock.

By the early twentieth century the resulting heterogeneous population had developed into two identifiable types: a "lowland" population standing some 140 to 152 cm at the withers and showing similarities to the horses of North Africa; and a smaller "mountain" type with more resemblance to Oriental horses, standing some 135–145 cm. From no later than 1925, mares of these types were being bred to Thoroughbred and Arab stallions in the hope of producing offspring with greater size and speed.

A breed society, the Associazione Regionale Allevatori del Cavallo Siciliano Indigeno, was formed in the early twenty-first century. In 2024 the breed was officially recognised by the Ministero dell'Agricoltura, della Sovranità Alimentare e delle Foreste, the Italian ministry of agriculture, and added to the register of local horse and donkey breeds of limited diffusion.

== Characteristics ==
The Siciliano is of medium size, with a height at the withers of 153–165 cm for males and 152–163 cm for mares; chest circumference and cannon bone circumference are 180–190 cm and 19–22 cm for males and 170–180 cm and 19–20 cm for mares. The coat may be any shade of bay, black, chestnut or grey.

== Use ==
Horses of this breed may be used for recreational riding, for working riding, for light harness work or for sporting activities including dressage, showjumping and eventing.

It is one of the many breeds used by mounted regiments of the Carabinieri.
