= Sardinian Anglo-Arab =

Italian breed of horse

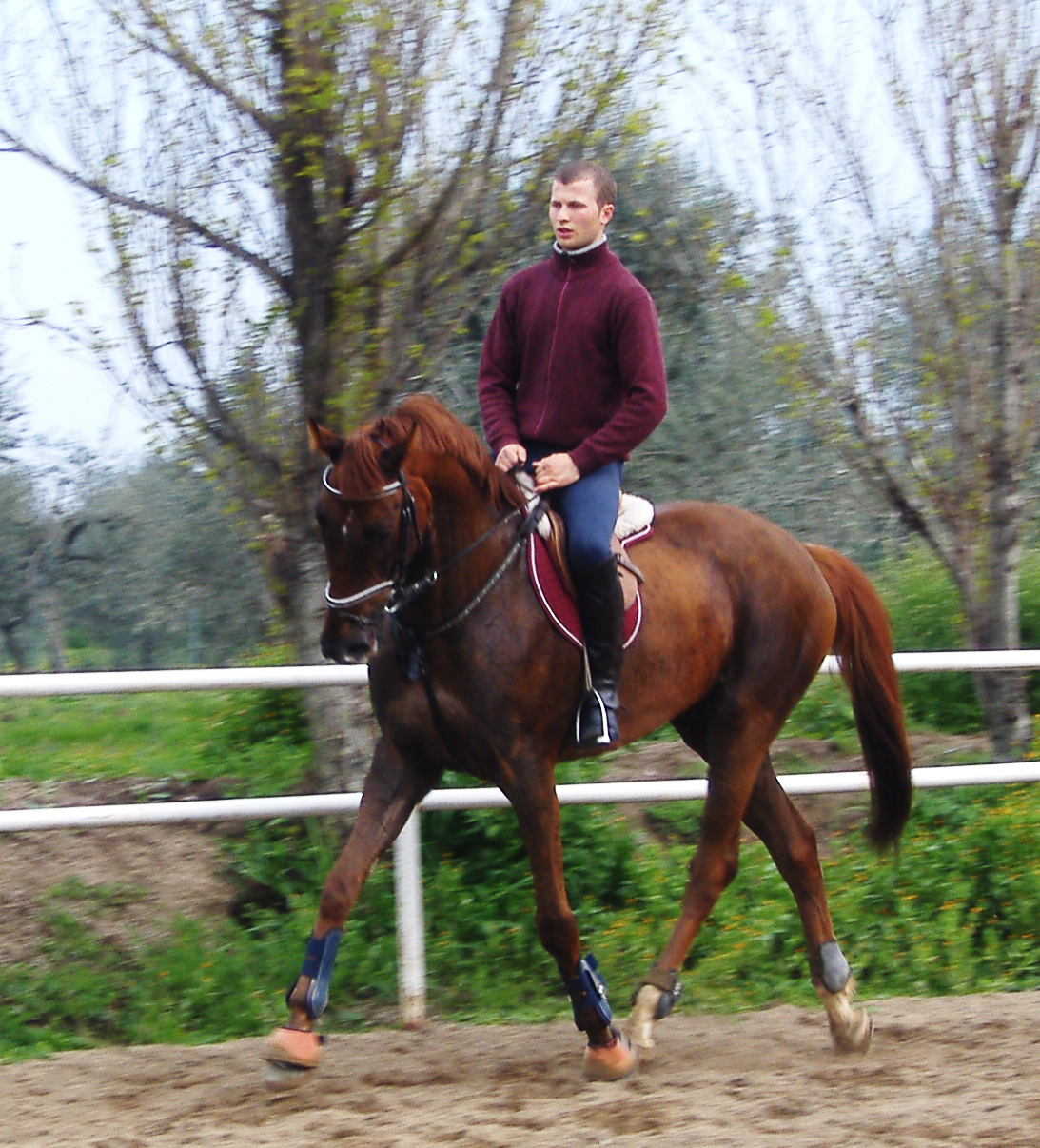
- Conservation status: FAO (2007): not at risk; DAD-IS (2022): at risk/endangered
- Other names: Italian: Anglo-Arabo Sardo; Sardinian: Anglu-Arabu Sardu; Cavallo Anglo-Arabo
- Country of origin: Italy
- Distribution: principally Sardinia
- Standard: MIPAAF (in Italian)
- Use: riding horse

Traits
- Weight: 450–600 kg
- Height: 158–170 cm
- Colour: bay; brown; chestnut; grey; black

The Sardinian Anglo-Arab or Anglo-Arabo Sardo is an Italian breed of riding horse from the Mediterranean island of Sardinia. It derives from cross-breeding of local mares with stallions of Arab, Anglo-Arab and Thoroughbred stock. Breeding began in 1874; the breed was officially recognised in 1967.

== History ==
Breeding of what would become the Sardinian Anglo-Arab began in 1874, when the Regio Deposito Stalloni or royal stud was established at Ozieri in the province of Sassari in northern Sardinia. There indigenous Sardinian mares were put to Oriental stallions of the Purosangue Orientale breed, with the aim of producing riding horses suitable for military use in the army of the new Italian state. From 1883 both French Anglo-Arab and Thoroughbred stallions were also used; from 1915 to 1937 the use of these was discontinued and only Arab stallions were employed. The demand for military horses was already substantially reduced by this time, and following the Second World War became negligible; from that time the horses were bred principally for competitive sport. Since the 1960s the major influence on the development of the breed has been the French Anglo-Arab.

The Anglo-Arabo Sardo was officially recognised in 1967. It is registered in the second section of the stud-book of the Sella Italiano. Like other sporting horses, it falls under the Ministero delle Politiche Agricole, Alimentari e Forestali, the Italian ministry of agriculture; the stud-book is kept by the Associazione Italiana Allevatori, the national association of animal breeders.

In 2018 the breeding stock stood at just over 3000 head, consisting of 134 stallions and 2871 brood-mares. In 2022 the conservation status of the breed was reported to DAD-IS as 'at risk'/'endangered'.

== Characteristics ==
The Sardinian Anglo-Arab is markedly Oriental in appearance. It is dolichomorphic in outline, lightly built but strong. The head is light and square, with a straight profile, small ears and large eyes and nostrils. The skin is fine, the coat fine, short and silky, with abundant mane and tail; the principal colours are bay, chestnut, less often grey.

== Use ==
The Anglo-Arabo Sardo was originally bred as a riding horse for military use. Since about the time of the Second World War it has been bred principally for competitive sport. It is particularly suitable for three-day eventing, but is also used for show-jumping and in races held specifically for half-blood horses, of which there are many in Sardinia; most of the horses that run in the Palio di Siena are of this breed.

In the three-day event, an early success was that of Rohan de Lechereo, ridden by Marina Sciocchetti, in the team which took the silver medal at the Summer Olympics in Moscow in 1980.
