= Esperia Pony =

Italian breed of horse

Pony dell'Esperia
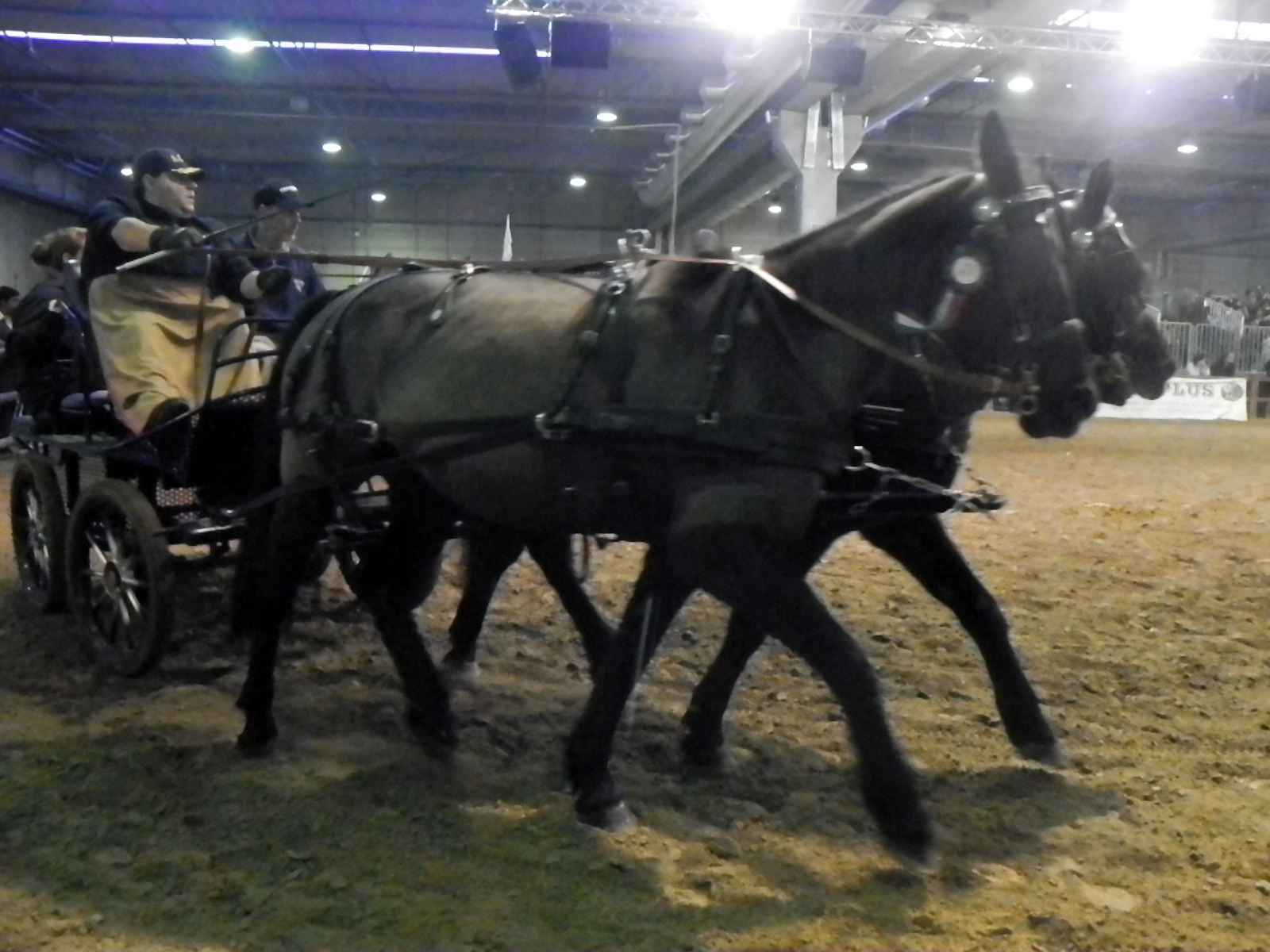
- Pair in harness at Fieracavalli, Verona, 2014

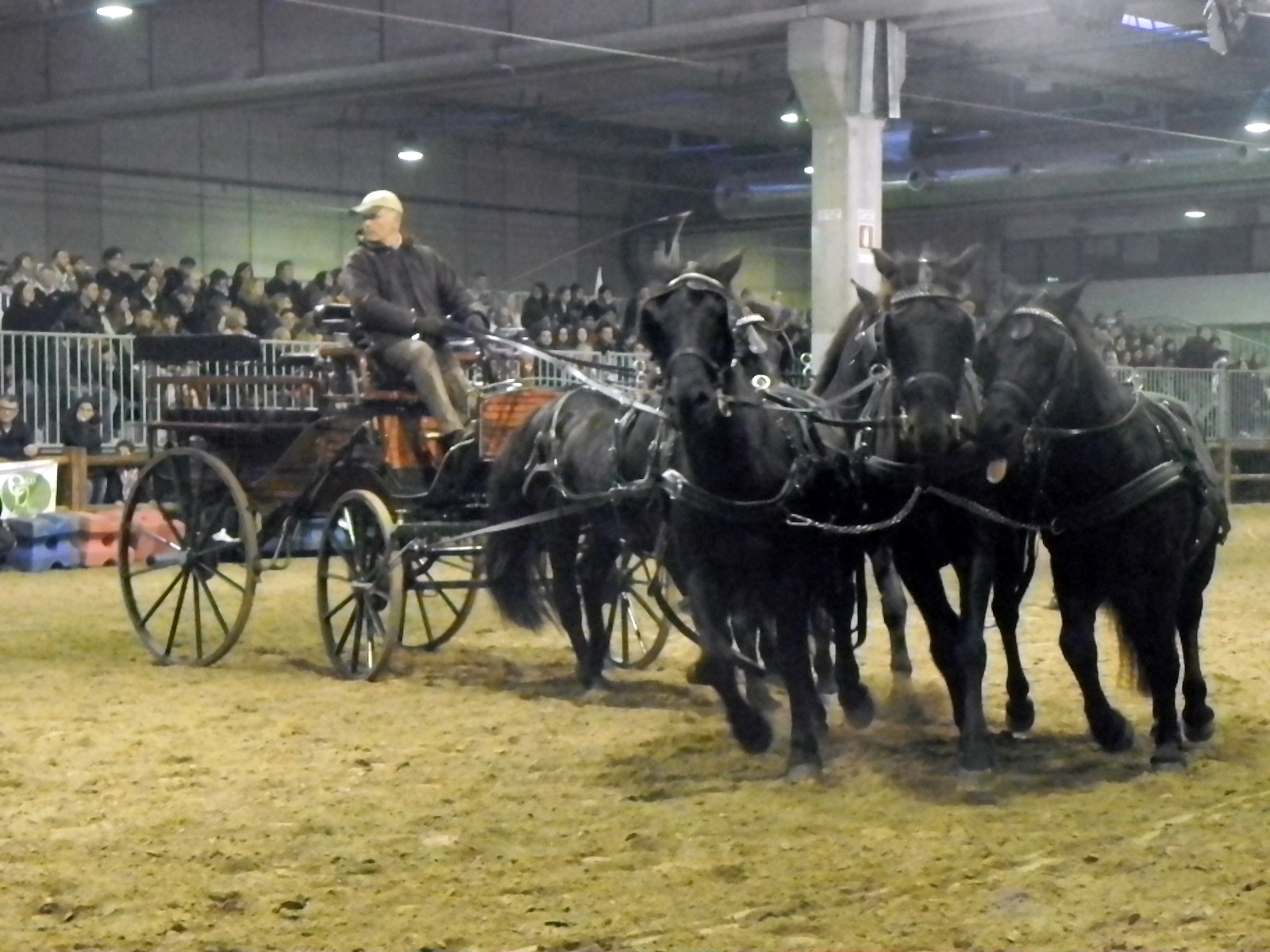
- Driven five-in-hand at Fieracavalli
- Conservation status: FAO (2007): endangered; DAD-IS (2025: at risk/endangered
- Other names: Esperia Pony; Pony di Esperia
- Country of origin: Italy
- Distribution: Lazio
- Standard: Associazione Italiana Allevatori

The Esperia Pony, Italian: Pony dell'Esperia or Pony di Esperia, is an Italian breed of small horse or pony originating in the area of the Monti Aurunci, the Monti Ausoni and the Monti Lepini, near Esperia in the province of Frosinone, in the Lazio region of Italy. It is one of the fifteen indigenous horse "breeds of limited distribution" recognised by the Associazione Italiana Allevatori, the Italian national breeders' association. It is the only Italian breed to be officially denominated a pony.
