= Roman Campagna =

Low-lying area surrounding Rome

Map of the region

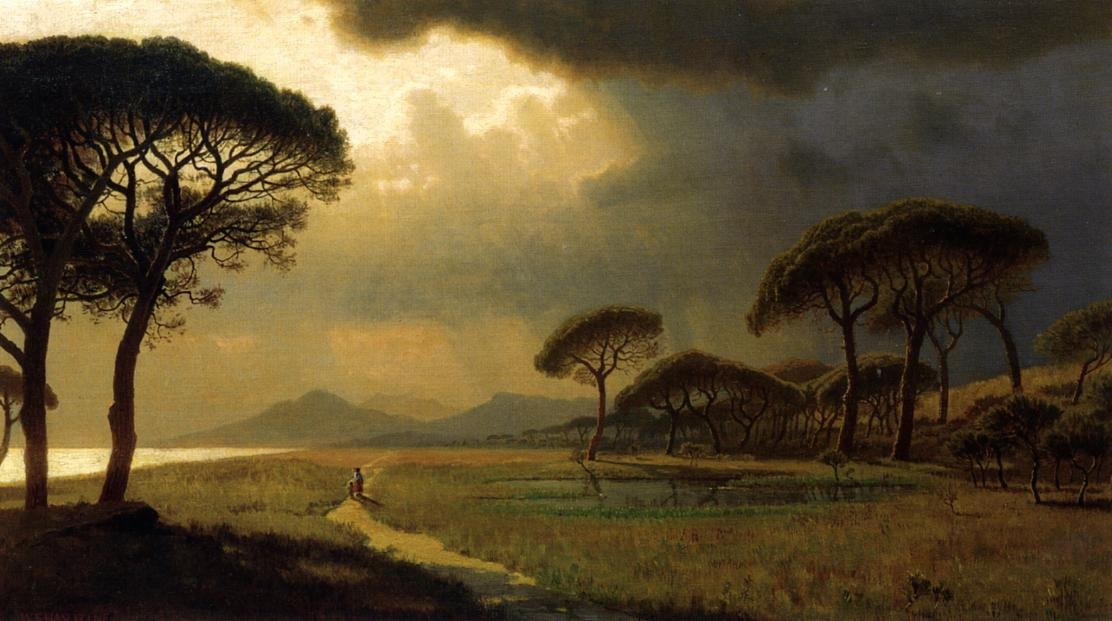
William Stanley Haseltine – Morning Light, Roman Campagna, 1871

The Roman Campagna (Italian: Campagna romana) is a low-lying area surrounding Rome in the Lazio region of central Italy, with an area of approximately 2,100 square kilometres (810 sq mi).

It is bordered by the Tolfa and Sabatini mountains to the north, the Alban Hills to the southeast, and the Tyrrhenian Sea to the southwest. The rivers Tiber and Aniene run through the area.

== History ==
During the ancient Roman period, it was an important agricultural and residential area, but it was abandoned during the Middle Ages due to malaria and insufficient water supplies for farming needs. The pastoral beauty of the Campagna inspired the painters who flocked into Rome in the 18th and 19th centuries. During that time, the Campagna became the most painted landscape in Europe. An excursion into the Roman countryside was an essential part of the Grand Tour.

The region was reclaimed in the 19th and 20th centuries for use in mixed farming, and new settlements have been built. Starting with the 1950s, the expansion of Rome destroyed large parts of the Campagna, all around the city. The only continuous green area where the natural resources of the region were saved from overbuilding is along the Via Appia.
