= Monterufolino =

Breed of horse

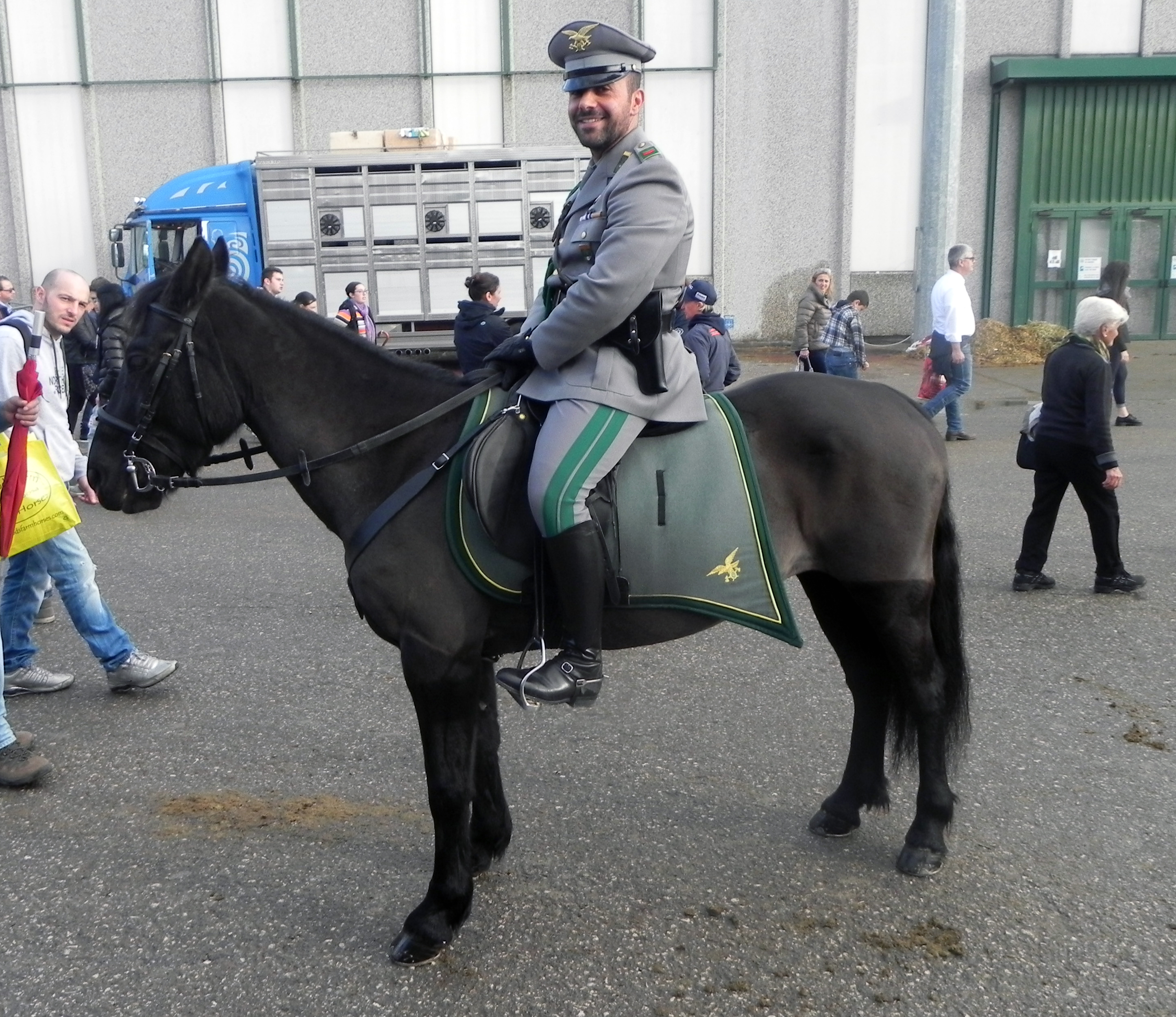
- Other names: Cavallino di Monterufoli
- Country of origin: Italy, native to Tuscany

Breed standards
- Associazione Italiana Allevatori

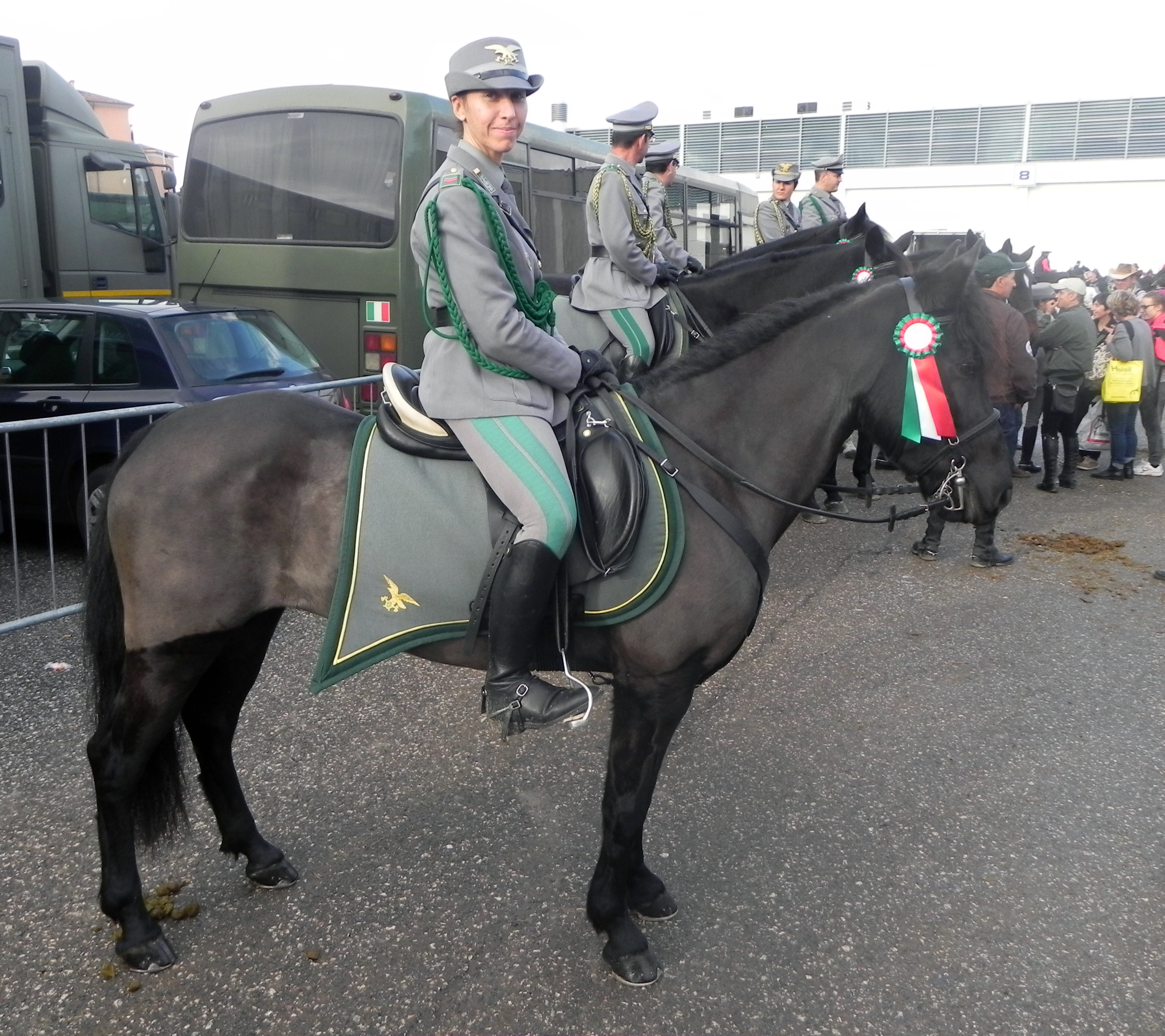
Monterufolino of the Corpo Forestale dello Stato at Fieracavalli, Verona

The Monterufolino or Cavallino di Monterufoli is a breed of small horse originating in the province of Pisa, in the Tuscany region of Italy. It is one of the fifteen indigenous horse "breeds of limited distribution" recognised by the AIA, the Italian breeders' association. It takes its name from a former farm estate, the "Tenuta di Monterufoli", now broken up, which covered some 4000 ha in the comuni of Pomarance, Montecatini Val di Cecina and Monteverdi Marettimo.

The status of the Cavallino di Monterufoli was listed in 2007 as critical by the Food and Agriculture Organization of the United Nations. At the end of 2008 the breed consisted of 38 mares, 9 stallions, and 125 foals.
