= Cavallo Romano della Maremma Laziale =

Horse breed from the Lazio region of Italy

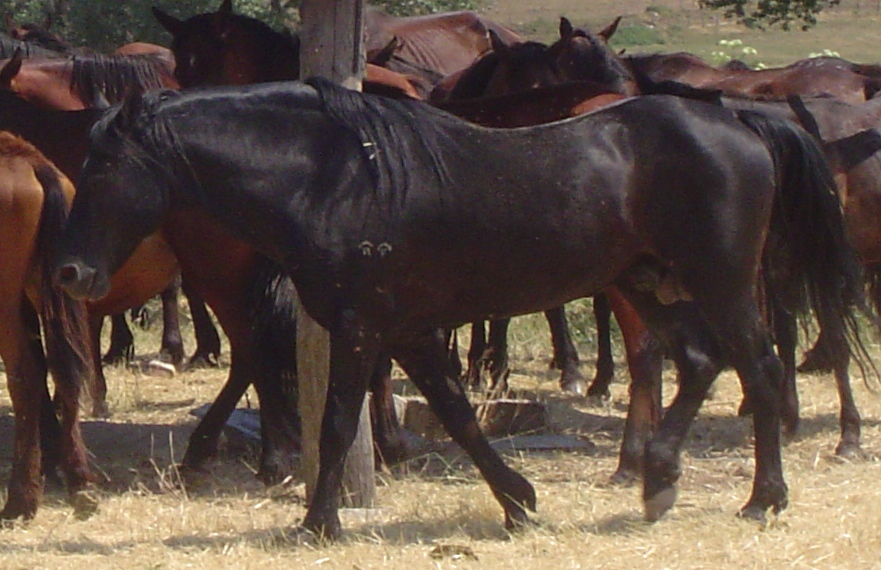
- A stallion in the breeding herd
- Country of origin: Italy, native to Lazio region

Breed standards
- Associazione Italiana Allevatori

The Cavallo Romano della Maremma Laziale, or "Roman horse of the part of the Maremma that is in Lazio", is a horse breed native to the Lazio region of Italy. An ancient breed, it was officially recognised only in 2010; it is now one of the fifteen indigenous horse "breeds of limited distribution" listed by the AIA, the Italian breeders' association. The Lazio region has assigned it the conservation status "at risk of erosion". The population numbers about 800, of which most are in the comune of Monte Romano in the province of Viterbo; a herd of approximately 200 is at Ponzano Romano in the province of Rome, and others are in the province of Rieti.

== History ==
The breed register for the Cavallo Romano della Maremma Laziale was opened on 19 October 2010, and the breed standard confirmed by Ministerial Decree 27202, dated 1 December 2010. DNA testing had shown that the traditional working horse of the Maremma of Lazio was not only physically but genetically distinguishable from its counterpart in the Tuscan Maremma, the Maremmano, with which it had previously been classed. The two populations are reported as having common origins but limited overlap, with the Roman horse showing greater variability and a higher proportion of "ancestral" genes; Ripert reports informally that the Cavallo Romano della Maremma Laziale has 38.5% genes of the original type, while the registered Maremmano population has only 12%. The genetic study, carried out by the Consorzio per la Sperimentazione, Divulgazione e Applicazione di Biotecniche Innovative (CONSDABI), National Focal Point for Italy of the Animal Genetic Resources project of the FAO, was presented at the 12th conference on "New findings in equine practice" held at Druento (Turin, Italy), 11–13 November 2010.

The ARSIAL (regional agency for development and innovation in agriculture of Lazio) suggests that this is the same horse breed as the "Cavallo Romano" that was well described in 19th century treatises; authors who discuss the Cavallo Romano include Moreschi (1903) and Fogliata (1910). It is also suggested that the Cavallo Romano della Maremma Laziale descends from the horses of the ancient Romans, such as that of Marcus Aurelius, or even of the Etruscans.

== Characteristics ==
The Cavallo Romano della Maremma Laziale may be bay, black, chestnut or grey; limited facial markings (star and stripe) are permitted, as are white socks. Males measure 155–165 cm (15.1–16.1 hands) at the withers, females 150–162 cm (14.3–16.0 hands). The girth and cannon measurements are similar for both sexes, approximately 170–210 cm (67–83 in) and 19–24 cm (7.5–9.4 in) respectively. The head is well set on, slightly long and heavy, and the profile convex or Roman; the neck is thick, muscular and arched, the mane and tail long and thick. The shoulder is muscular and tends to be straight, the chest is broad with substantial muscle, the girth is deep and the back is short, straight and muscular, sometimes slightly concave. The croup is broad and sloping, and the tail is set low. The legs are solid, strong and muscular, the hooves broad and strong. Horses with concave profile, long or drooping ears, or poor conformation of the legs are not admitted for registration.

The action of the Cavallo Romano is lively and well-marked, and its temperament docile and courageous. It is sure-footed on even the most difficult terrain.

For comparison, the description of the Cavallo Romano given by Moreschi in 1903 is this:

"The characteristics of the robust Roman horse were these: slightly convex profile, broad forehead, ears small and firmly attached, large eyes, neck a little thick but with plenty of curvature, mane long and thick, well developed withers, shoulder rather short, robust forearm, strong knees, cannons slightly rounded, fore pasterns short and feathered, hoof strong, sole resistant, forefeet sure, body cylindrical, ribs rounded, chest broad, back straight, loins robust, croup broad and a little sloping, long thick tail attached a little low, thigh rounded and a little curved, gaskins strong and short, the hocks strong, hind cannons as the fore, height from 1.45 m to 1.60 m, coat black in all its variations, also many bays and greys. Camped under at the front; majestic bearing."

== Uses ==
Although sometimes employed in the past as a warhorse and as a carriage horse, the primary use of the Cavallo Romano was as a working horse for the management of open-range livestock, particularly horses, cattle and sheep. Until the land drainage and reclamation of the fascist era the Maremma region was, like the campagna romana and the Pontine Marshes, wild and inhospitable, and inhabited mostly by vast herds of livestock, transhumant shepherds and the cavalcanti, the "riders", as the butteri of the Maremma Laziale were called. The traditions of the cavalcanti and their style of working riding, the Monta italiana da lavoro, are still taught and transmitted by a small number of riding academies. In addition to herding work, the Cavallo Romano is used today as a saddle horse for trekking; other uses include agricultural and light draught work, use as pack animals, and the production of high quality meat and of milk for paediatric or cosmetic use.
