= Persano horse =

Breed of horse

Persano
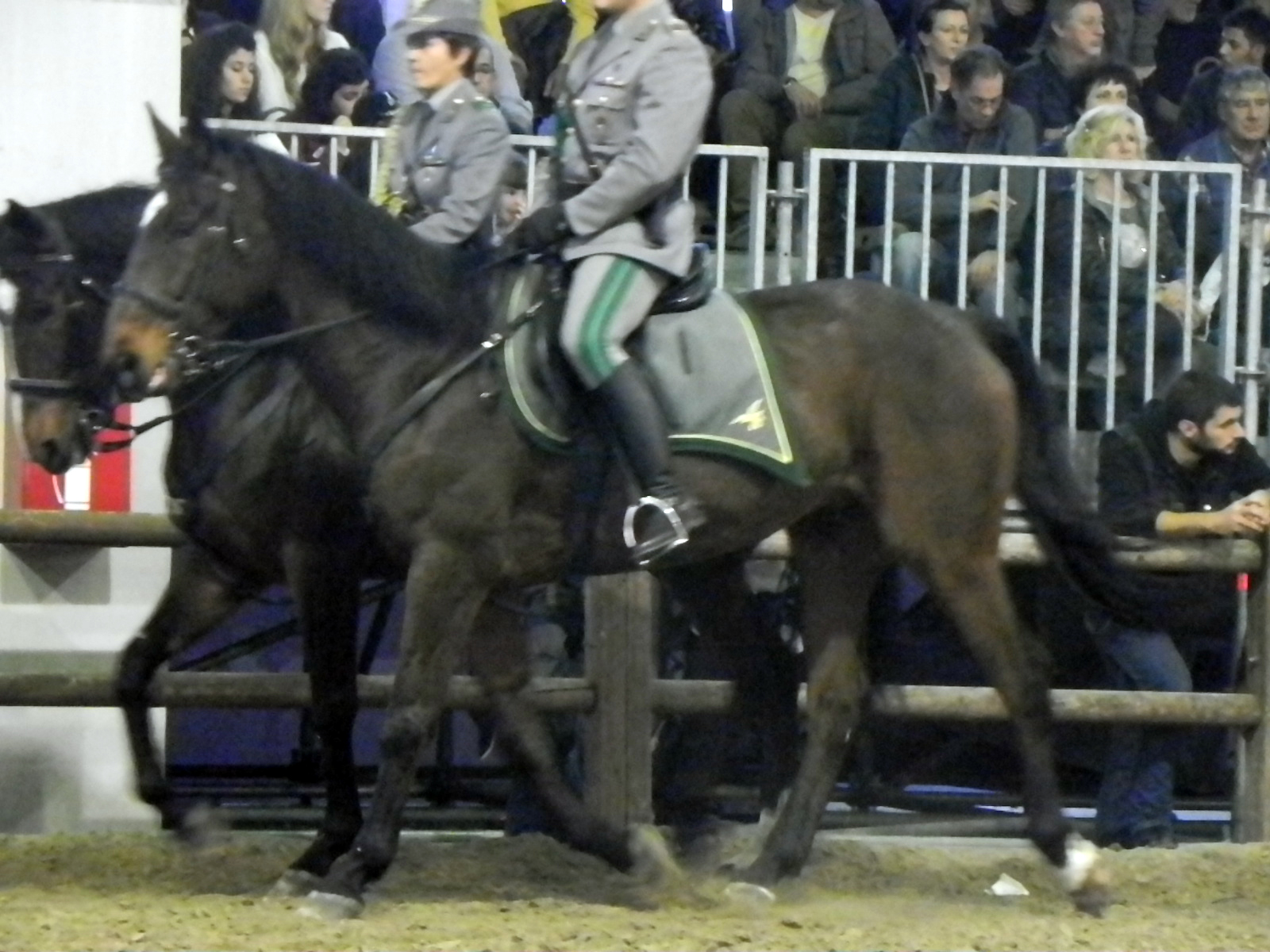
- Persano horses of the Corpo Forestale dello Stato at Fieracavalli in Verona

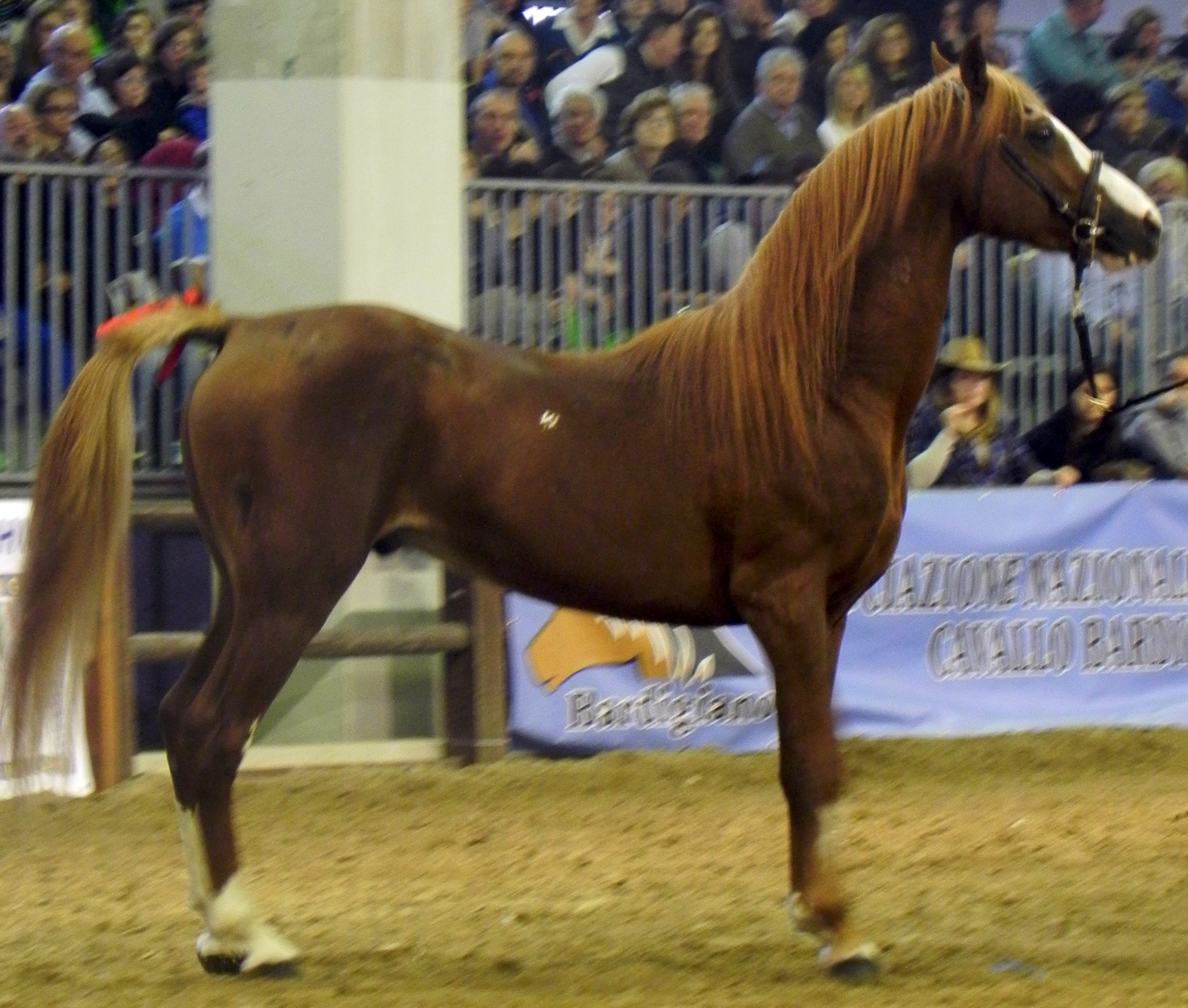
Persano stallion

The Persano is a horse breed created during the Kingdom of Naples (18th century) at the Royal Stud of Persano near Serre in the Italian province of Salerno. It is similar in appearance to an Anglo Arabian and was created by crossing Andalusians, Arabians, Turkomans and Mecklenburgers.

The original breeding herd was dispersed, but was later reconstituted by crossbreeding the horses still available with Purosangue Orientale, Thoroughbred and a new group of stallions freshly imported from Syria. The process was driven by the needs of the Italian Cavalry. After the second world war the breed was reduced to only about 50 heads, most of which were transferred to the Grosseto Army Remount Station. Some horses however are still in the hands of private owners. The status of the Persano was listed in 2007 as critical by the Food and Agriculture Organization of the United Nations.

The Persano were developed for use as cavalry horses, and are used today by the mounted Carabinieri Regiments. Horses of this breed were amongst the protagonists of the last successful classical cavalry charge in history in August 1942 near Isbushensky on the Don river by a cavalry unit of the Italian Expeditionary Corps in Russia (Corpo di Spedizione Italiano in Russia, or CSIR) on the Eastern Front. The 2nd squadron of the 3rd Dragoons Savoia Cavalleria Regiment of the Prince Amedeo Duke of Aosta Fast (Celere) Division, armed with sabres and hand grenades, outflanked an estimated 2,000 Soviet infantry while the remainder of the regiment took Isbushensky in a dismounted attack. The Persano proved to be tough enough for the conditions encountered in the Russian steppe, a claim which few foreign horses can make.

== References and external links ==
- 1939 Documentary on the Persano Horse Herd
- Persano Horse today
- The Charge at Isbushensky, last cavalry charge in history
- Persano Horse Association
