= Monti della Tolfa =

Volcanic group in the Anti-Apennines, Lazio, Italy

Coordinates: 42°08′N 11°54′E

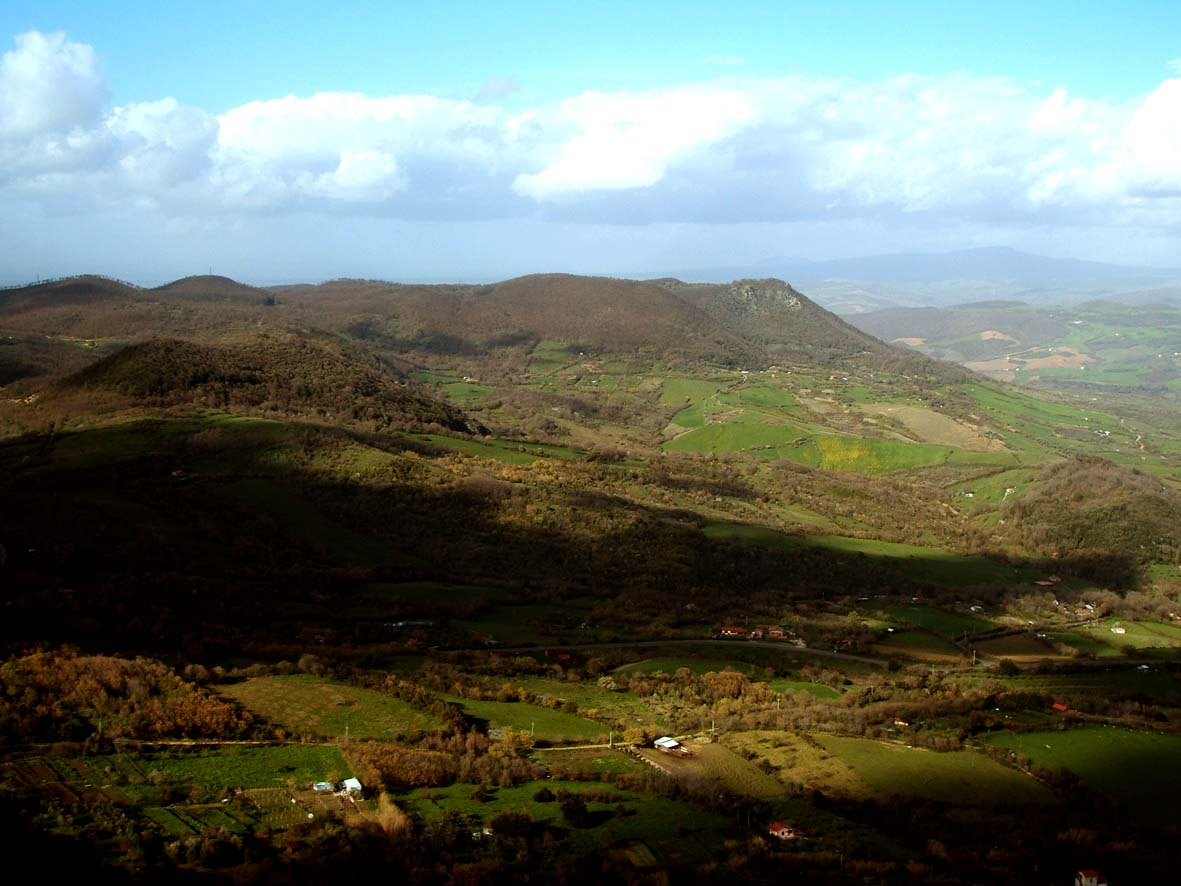
A view in the Monti della Tolfa.

The Monti della Tolfa (or Tolfa Mountains) are a volcanic group in the Anti-Apennines of the northern part of the Lazio region of Central Italy. They are bounded by the Tyrrhenian Sea coast to the west, by the Monti Sabatini to the east, and by the Monti Cimini and the Mignone river to the north. Tolfa and Allumiere are the principal towns; the cruise ship port of Civitavecchia is the largest nearby city.

The highest peak is the Monte Maggiore (633 m above sea level).

The Monti della Tolfa consists mostly of trachytes formed during the Eocene and the early Pleistocene.

The mountains are an important source of alunite, from which alum is extracted. The mineral was discovered there in 1461, and extensively mined until the mine closed in 1941, after almost 500 years; for much of this time it was the principal source of alum in Europe.

The Tolfetano breed of horse originates in the area, and takes its name from it.
