= Monti Sabatini =

Mountain range in Italy

Coordinates: 42°10′N 12°15′E

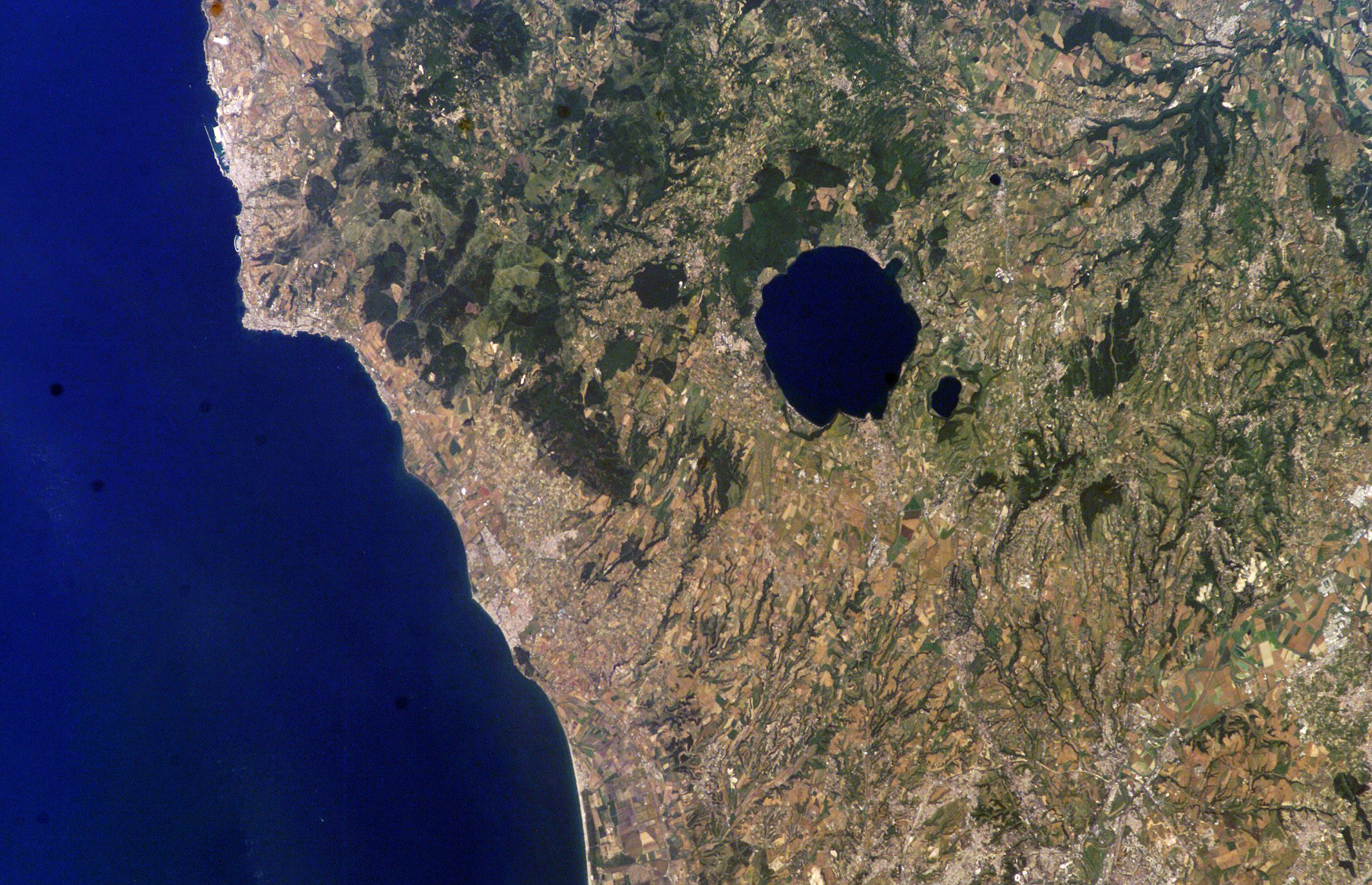
A view from the space of the Sabatini region, showing Lake Bracciano as the dark round structure. Source: Nasa Shuttle.

The Monti Sabatini is a geologic region in Lazio, central Italy, a remnant of intense volcanism which started ca. 600,000 years ago, mainly with pyroclastic and maar forming eruptions which continued until 100,000 years ago. The region is classified as a dormant volcanic district. The mountains are part of the Lazio's Anti-Apennines. Included between the Monti Sabatini is the Lake Bracciano, which is a volcanotectonic depression formed about 3.7 Ma, and the Lake Martignano. The sedimentary base of the Sabatini complex lies buried under 200 m (660 ft) of volcanic ash and rocks.

== Background ==
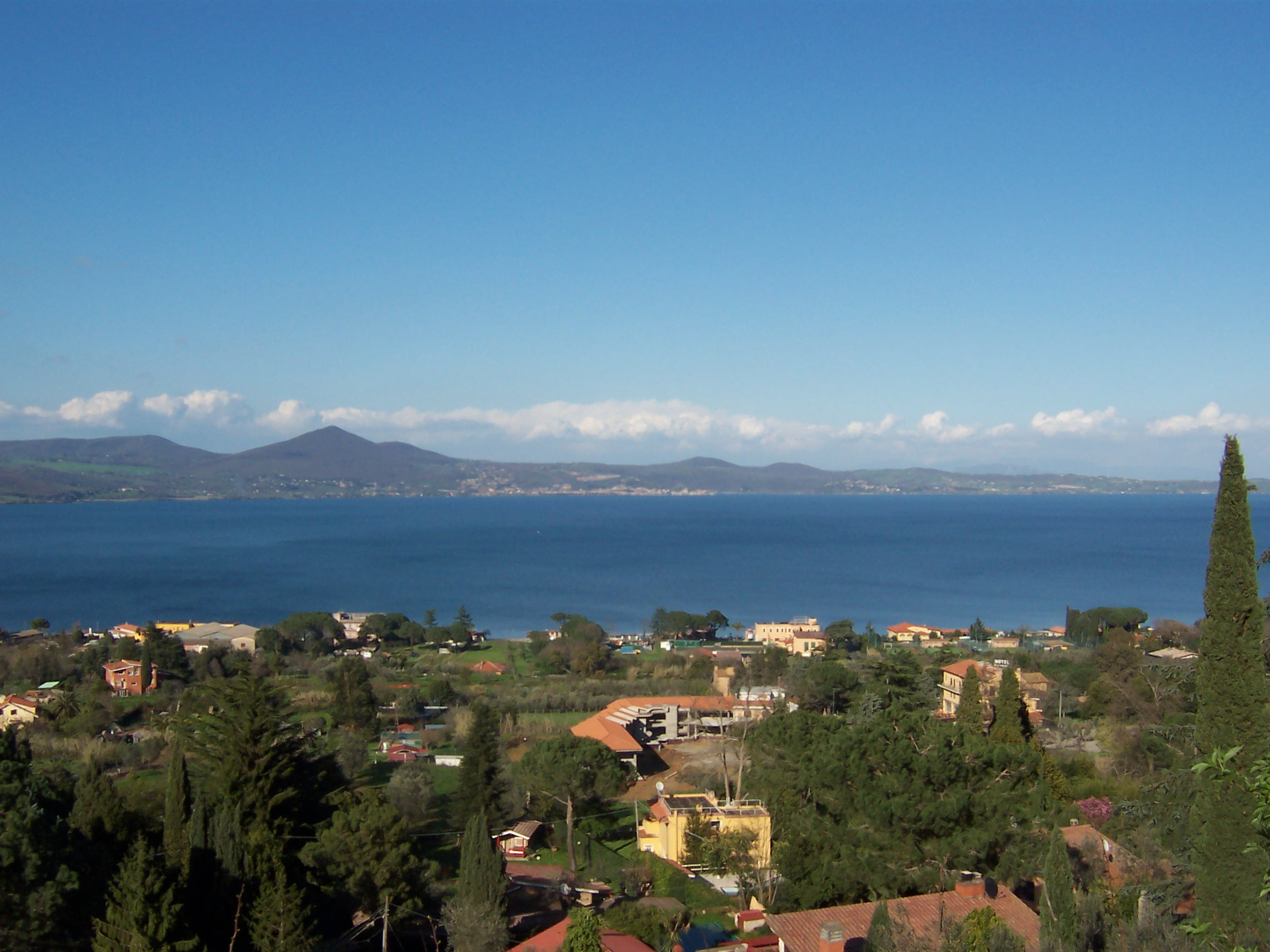
Lake Bracciano.

The highest point is Monte Rocca Romana (a postcaldera stratocone), at 612 m (2,008 ft).

Other mountains in the area include Monti della Tolfa, Monte Soratte, and more southwards, by the Monti Cornicolani.

== See also ==
- List of volcanoes in Italy
- Monti Volsini
- Monti Cimini
