= Maremma =

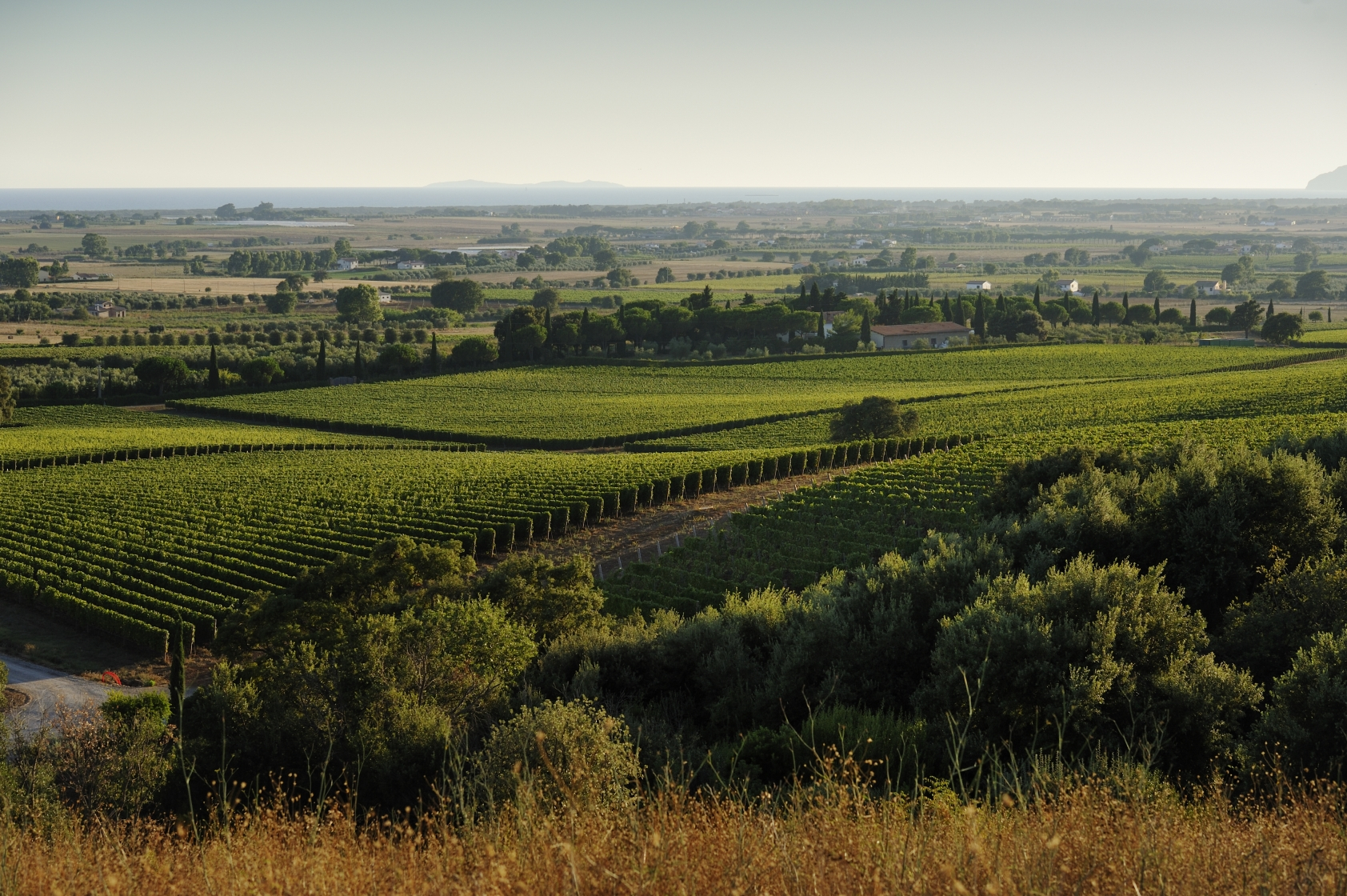
- Landscape near Capalbio, province of Grosseto

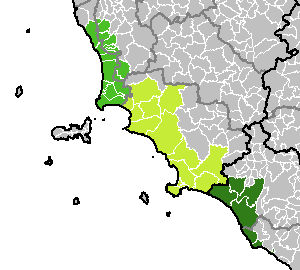
- Area of Maremma
- Coordinates: 42.70°N 11.20°E
- Country: Italy
- Region: central and southern Tuscany; northern Lazio

Area
  - Total: 5,000 km^{2} (1,900 sq mi)

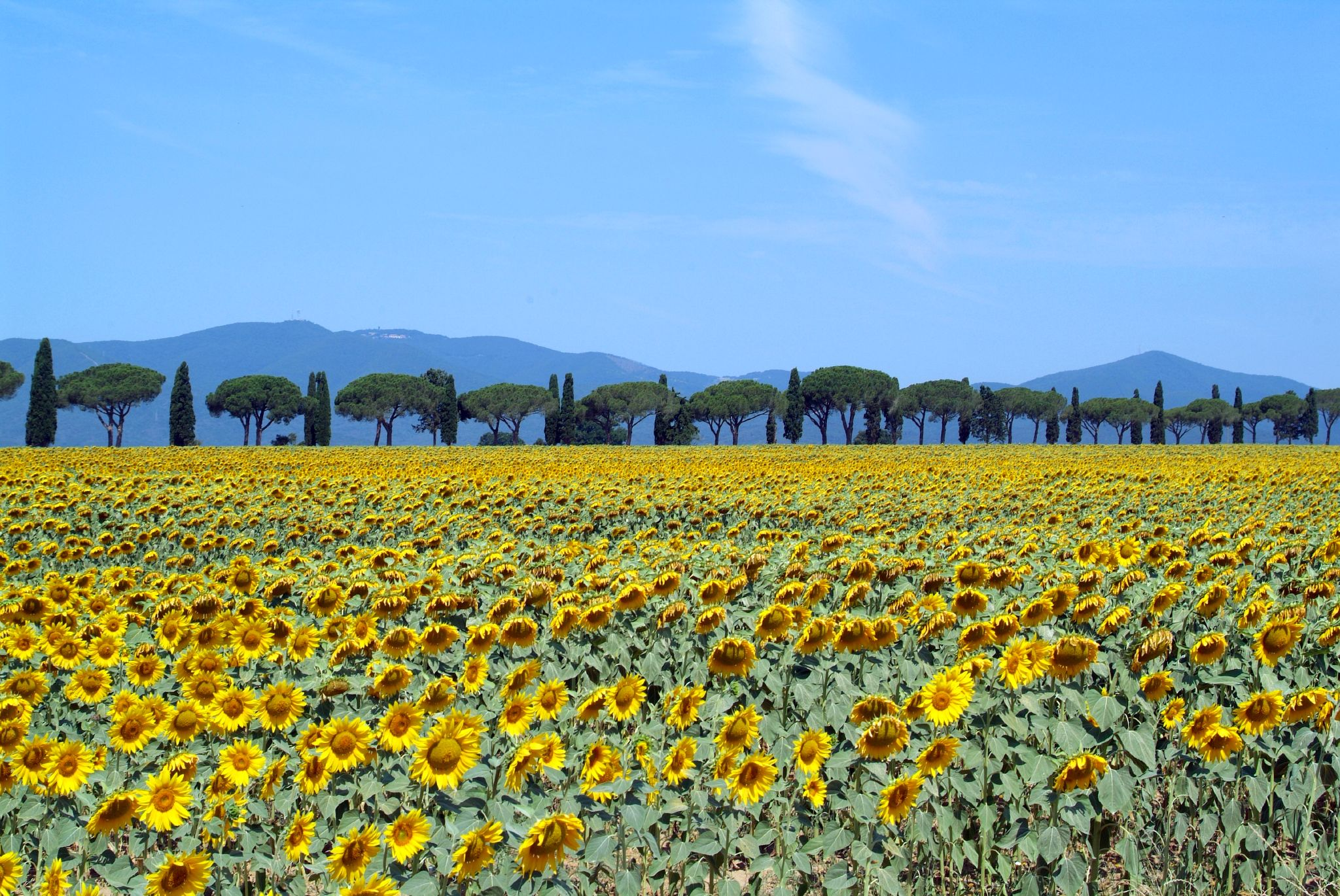
A sunflower field in the Maremma

The Maremma (/məˈrɛmə/, Italian: [maˈremma]; from Latin maritima, lit. 'maritime [land]') is a geographical region in Tuscany and northern Lazio. The largest city is Grosseto.

== Geography ==
The Maremma has an area of about 5000 km^{2}. The central part corresponds with the province of Grosseto, and it extends northward to Cecina in Tuscany, and southwards into Lazio as far as Civitavecchia. The territory is mainly flat and hilly.

== Animal breeds ==
The Maremma has given rise to, or given its name to, several breeds of domestic animal. These include two breeds of working horse, the Maremmano and the Cavallo Romano della Maremma Laziale, formerly used by butteri and cavalcanti; the Maremmana breed of large grey cattle; the Maremmano breed of shepherd's guard-dog; and the Macchiaiola Maremmana breed of small pig, so named because it was kept extensively, left to roam in the woodland.
