= Catria horse =

Breed of horse

Catria
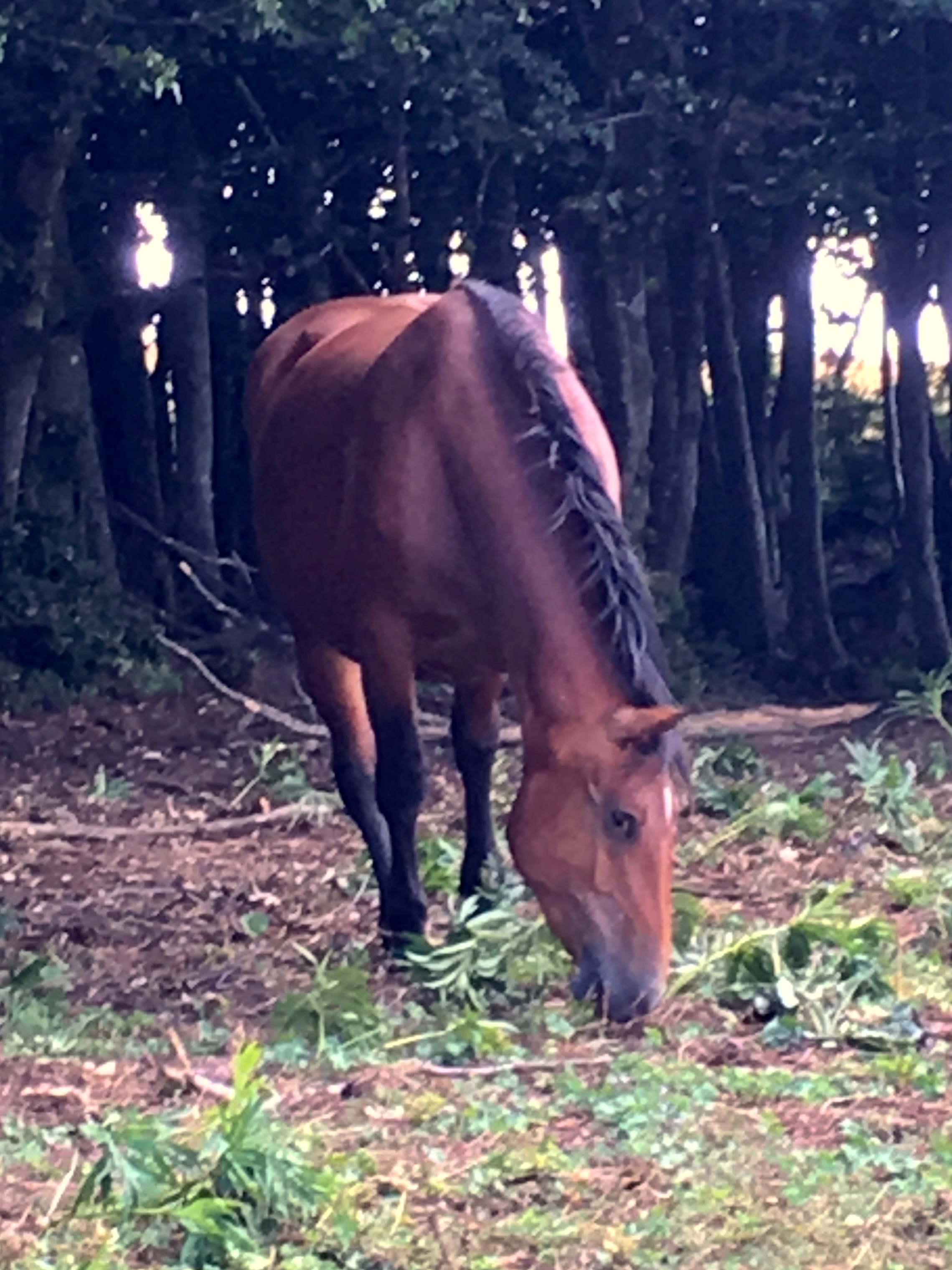
- Mare on Monte Catria
- Conservation status: FAO (2007): endangered
- Other names: Cavallo del Catria
- Country of origin: Italy
- Distribution: Marche; Umbria
- Standard: Associazione Italiana Allevatori

Traits
- Colour: bay, black bay or chestnut

The Catria or Cavallo del Catria is an Italian breed of horse. It is named for the massif of Monte Catria in the Marche region of Italy, where it is thought to have originated, and is distributed also in parts of the provinces of Ancona, Perugia and Pesaro. It is one of the fifteen indigenous horse "breeds of limited distribution" recognised by the AIA, the Italian breeders' association.

== History ==
The Catria derives from the cross-breeding of Maremmano-derived stock from west of the Apennines, thought to have been brought from their homeland in Tuscany mainly by charcoal burners, with other breeds, principally the Swiss Franches-Montagnes. Numbers fell at the time of the Second World War, and the population survived in mountainous areas suitable only for untended livestock. In 1974, the Azienda Speciale Consortile del Catria, or "special co-operative agency of Catria", took control of horse breeding in the area. In 1980, a herd book was opened to conserve the bloodlines of the breed.

== Characteristics ==
The coat colour may only be bay, black bay or chestnut; breeding stallions may not be chestnut. The head is light with a straight profile. The chest is wide and muscular. Heights at the withers are 145–160 cm (14.1–15.3 h) for males and 140–155 cm (13.3–15.1 h) for mares.

== Use ==
The horses are used in the mountains for agricultural purposes, particularly for carrying cut firewood from steep woodland. They are also used for riding and for the production of horsemeat.
