= Maremmano =

Breed of horse

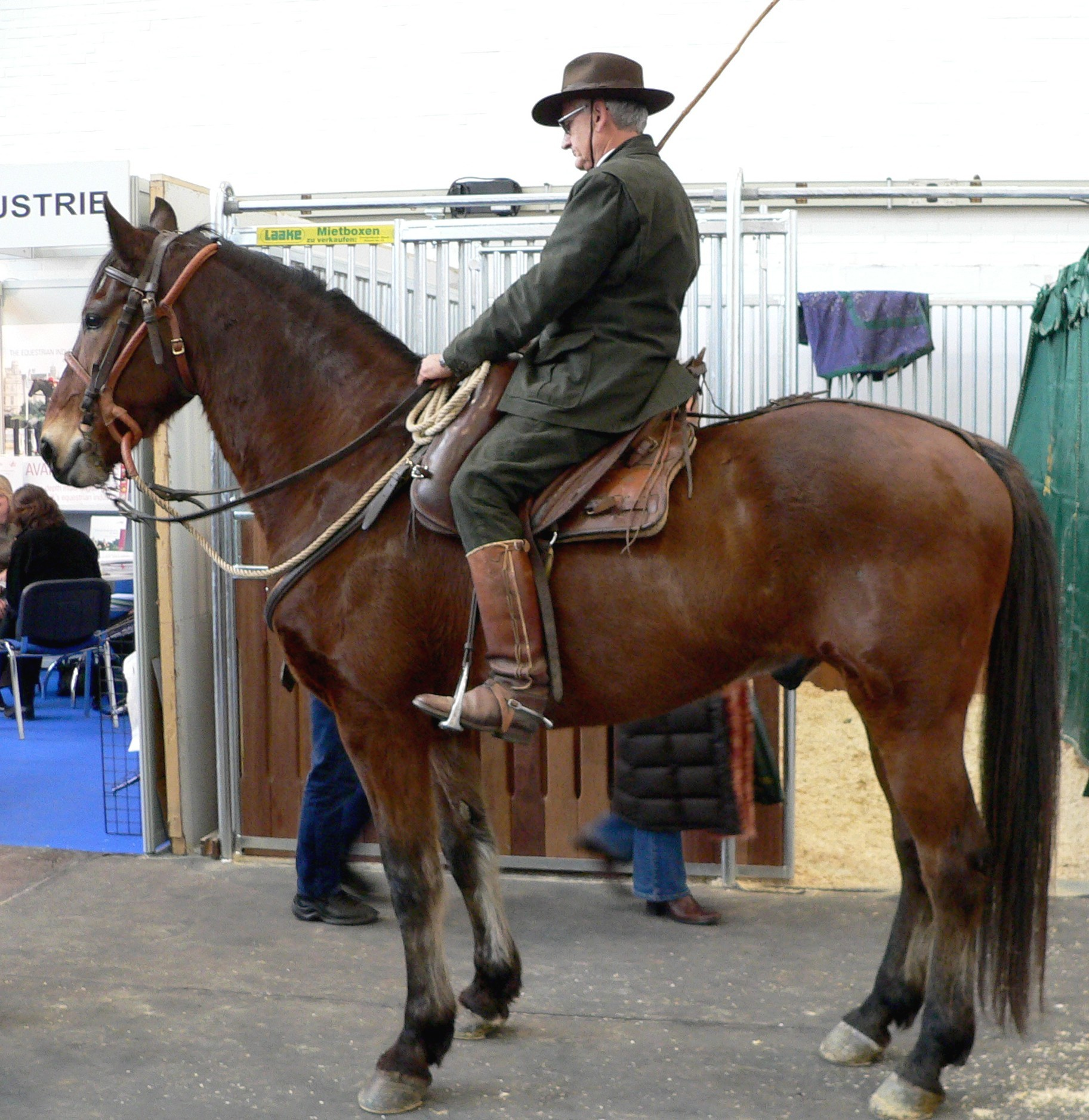
- Maremmano horse
- Other names: Tuscan Horse
- Country of origin: Italy

The Maremmano is a breed of horse originating in the Maremma area of Tuscany and northern Lazio in Italy. Traditionally a hardy working horse used by the Butteri for livestock management, it is today principally a saddle horse. Extensive crossing with Thoroughbred and other breeds has led to a more athletic type, the Maremmano migliorato, or "Improved Maremmano".

== History ==
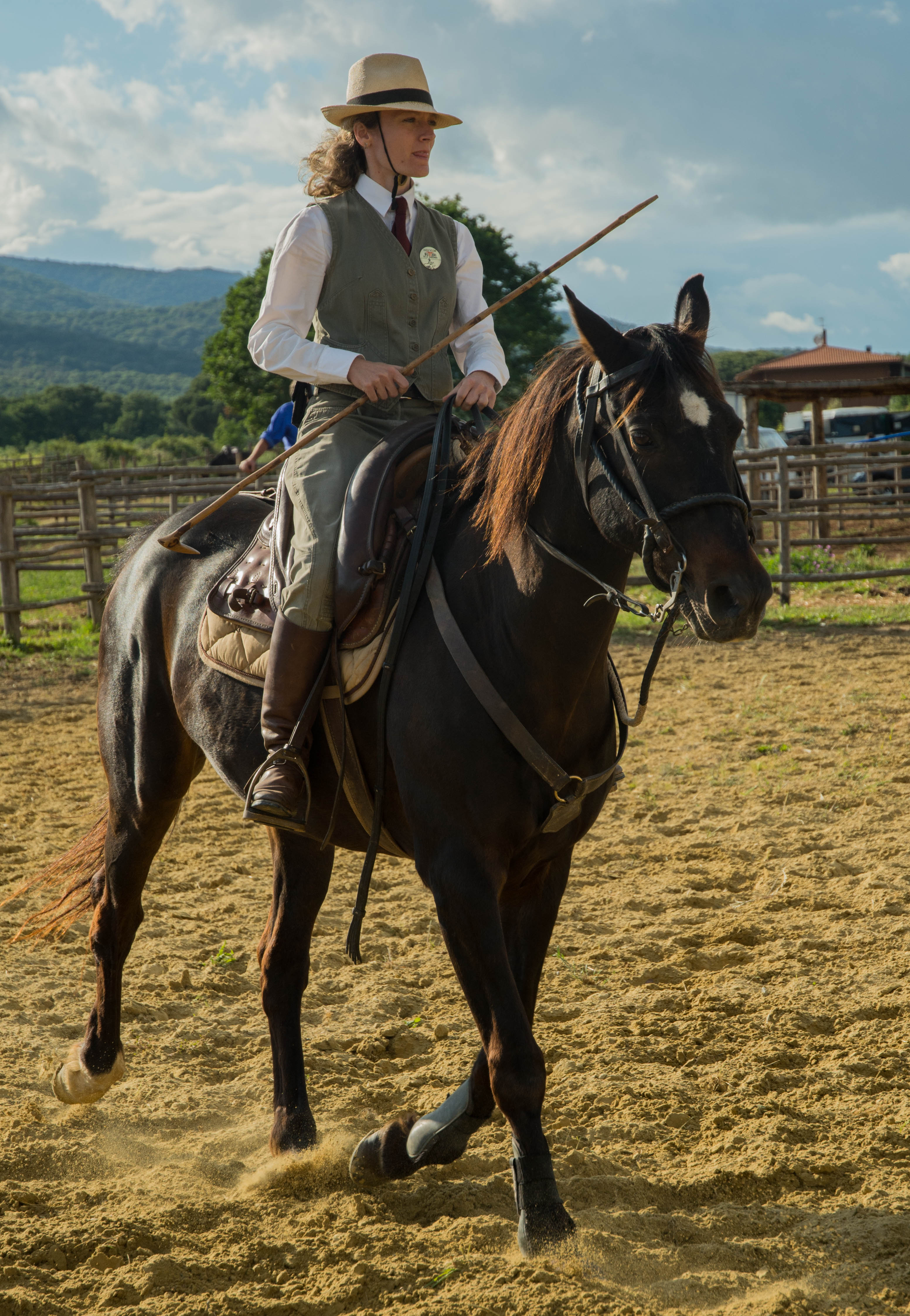
A buttero from Tuscany riding a Maremmano horse.

The history of the Maremmano breed is not fully known, but it is thought that they were developed from North African stock that was combined with Spanish, Barb, Neapolitan and Arabian blood. During the 19th century, Thoroughbred, Norfolk Roadster and other blood was probably added.

For more than a century the original Maremanno type has been crossbred with additional Thoroughbred blood, resulting in a taller and more refined type, but at the expense of the hardiness and stamina of the original breed. Crossbreeding with Freiberger horses in the Pesaro province of Italy has resulted in a breed known as the Catria Horse.

== Breed characteristics ==
The Maremmano breed generally stands between 15 and 15.3 hands (60 and 63 inches, 152 and 160 cm) and is usually bay, brown, dark chestnut or black, although gray and roan are occasionally seen. It has a long, slightly heavy head, a muscular neck that is broad at the base, high, well-muscled withers, a full chest and sloping shoulders. The back is short, the croup sloping, and the legs solid and sturdy with good joints and strong hooves. The breed is known for its solidity and their ability to adapt to bad weather and rough terrain.

== Uses ==
The Maremmano is the traditional mount of the Maremma cattle men, known as butteri, and is also used for light draft work. Horses of this breed have often been used as cavalry mounts and today are used by Italian Mounted Police. They were amongst the protagonists of the last successful classical cavalry charge in history in August 1942 near Isbushensky on the Don river by a cavalry unit of the Italian Expeditionary Corps in Russia (Corpo di Spedizione Italiano in Russia, or CSIR) on the Eastern Front. The 2nd squadron of the 3rd Dragoons Savoia Cavalleria Regiment of the Prince Amedeo Duke of Aosta Fast (Celere) Division, armed with sabres and hand grenades, outflanked an estimated 2,000 Soviet infantry while the remainder of the regiment took Isbushensky in a dismounted attack, . The Maremmano proved to be tough enough to brave the Russian steppe, a feat which few foreign horses can boast about.

== See also ==
- Buttero
- Monterufolino
- Tolfetano
- Cavallo Romano della Maremma Laziale
