= Fieracavalli =

- Date: Annually
- Locations: Verona Exhibition Centre, Verona, Italy
- Inaugurated: 1898
- Most recent: 3–6 November 2022
- Next event: 9–12 November 2023
- Attendance: 158,000 by 2013

Fieracavalli is an international show dedicated to horses and horse riding, which takes place in Verona every year from 1898 in early November. Since 2001 the Festival hosts the only Italian stage Rolex FEI World Cup, International Grand Prix jump obstacles. The Italian stage Jumping Verona is held inside the Exhibition Centre during the event.
