= Purosangue Orientale =

Breed of horse

- Country of origin: Italy

The Purosangue Orientale or Puro Sangue Orientale (PSO) (en: "Oriental Purebred"), is an Italian horse breed developed by Royal Decree n° 2690 of 19 September 1875 in the Kingdom of Italy, which created a stud book dedicated to the breed. Beginning in 1864, the Italian Government had sent emissaries into Levant and Mesopotamia to purchase desert bred Arabian horses directly from Bedouin tribes. Numerous stallions and mares were purchased and brought back to Sicily, many being destined for the Royal Remount Station in Catania. The breeding of Arabian Horses in Italy, therefore predates the Crabbet Park Stud which only started in 1878. Furthermore, the Crabbet Park Stud obtained most of its horses from the stables of Abbas-Pasha in Egypt, and therefore Africa, whereas the horses obtained from the Italian Government came directly from the Syrian Desert, and therefore from Asia and Arabia. One must also consider that the financial resources of a major European government must also surpass those of a private individual and a government can certainly afford to purchase much more expensive horses, since the purpose was to improve cavalry remounts and therefore national interest was at stake. Lastly, the Italian Government could also rely on the expertise of Carlo Guarmani, who was born in Italy in 1828, but whose family moved to the Middle East, where he was raised. He was fluent in Arabic and had a passion for horses, and spent 16 years traveling in Syria, Palestine, Egypt and Northern Arabia. He knew the Bedouins of the Syrian desert well and spent much time with them. He was commissioned to acquire Arab stallions for the stables of Napoleon III and for the then king of Italy, Vittorio Emanuele II. Although he had been to Egypt, he headed for the Syrian desert when he needed to purchase horses. His knowledge and direct contact with the Bedouins of the Arabian desert was far greater than that of Lady Anne Blunt, the founder of Crabbet Park Stud.

The PSO constitutes the oldest officially recognised Italian breed. The Puro Sangue Orientale is a mesomorphic or mesodolichomorphic horse, with particularly harmonious forms. It closely resembles an Arabian horse, being however a little taller and with more substantial physique. Height is between 14.1 to 15.1 hands (57 to 61 inches, 145 to 155 cm), with some specimens reaching 15.3 hands (63 inches, 160 cm). Average height of males is 148 cm, cannon bone circumference is 19 cm and chest circumference is 174 cm. Its coat is usually bay, chestnut or gray. It is therefore similar to a Shagya or a Tersk horse. Today there are only 170 specimens of this horse, of which 150 live in Sicily. Its numbers have been declining, and the Government Stud where it is bred is carrying out a policy of crossing with other strains of Arabian horses, causing the dilution of the qualities of the original Syrian desert bred strain.

== References and external links ==
- Young PSO Stallion
- page on PSO
- How the Italian Army obtained Desert bred Syrian Stallions to create PSO and AAS-Italian
- Article from cavallo 2000 magazine on PSO
- Ajroldi di Robbiate E (1908) - Sull’acquisto di stalloni arabi in Oriente 1907–1908, Roma
