= Bartolomeo d'Aragona =

Statesman and count

Bartolomeo d'Aragona (English: Bartholomew) was a Sicilian statesman, the eldest son and heir of Vinciguerra d'Aragona. His surname derives from the fact that he was a great-great-grandson of Peter III of Aragon in the male line.

He succeeded his father as count of Cammarata in an unknown year (1379–1381 with castles of Motta S. Agata and Pietra d'Amico). He was opposed to the succession of Martin I in 1390 and was appointed seneschal of Sicily on 10 July 1391 at a meeting of the baronage at Castronovo. In 1391 he added title to Ficarra, Raccuja, Librizzi, Galati, Calatabiano, Oliveri, Piraino, Sant'Angelo di Brolo, Tortorici, Zuppardino and Naso (with castle of Capo d'Orlando) to his résumé. He rebelled openly in 1393, but submitted in 1396 to the offer of Guglielmo Ventimiglia.

In 1397 Bartolomeo again rebelled, this time with Guglielmo Raimondo de Moncada and Antonio de Ventimiglia, count of Collesano. After Martin and the Papacy reached an agreement, Bartolomeo fled to exile at the court of Ladislaus of Naples. He armed a small fleet in 1400 in an attempt to return to Sicily, but he was defeated and died in exile.

His daughter Bartolomea spouse of Enrico II de Ventimiglia, Count of Geraci, and mother of Giovanni I de Ventimiglia, Viceroy of Sicily and Duchy of Athens, Governor of Naples, Marquis of Geraci (1436), Count of Montesarchio, lord of Bitonto, Sciacca, Cefalù etc.

== Sources ==
- Ghisalberti, Alberto M., ed. Dizionario Biografico degli Italiani: III Ammirato – Arcoleo. Rome, 1961.
