= Natoli =

Natoli is a surname. It may refer to:

- Carlotta Natoli (born 1971), Italian actress
- Guido Natoli (1893-1966), Italian banker
- Giacomo Natoli (1846-1896), Italian banker and politician
- Giovanni Natoli, Sicilian nobleman
- Giuseppe Natoli (1815-1867), Italian statesman
- Luigi Natoli (1799-1875), Sicilian archbishop
- Piero Natoli (1947–2001), Italian actor, director and screenwriter
- Vincenzo Natoli (1690-1770), Sicilian magistrate
