= Oriole =

Oriole or Orioles may refer to:

== Animals ==
- Old World oriole, colorful passerine birds in the family Oriolidae
- New World oriole, a group of birds in the family Icteridae

== Music ==
- The Orioles, an R&B and doo-wop group of the late 1940s and early 1950s
- Oriole (band), a London-based world music jazz fusion band active in the 2000s
- Oriole Records (UK), a record label
- Oriole Records (U.S.), a record label

== Places ==
=== Australia ===
- Oriole Park (Sydney), a park and a former baseball stadium in the western suburb of Auburn

=== United States ===
- Oriole, Indiana, an unincorporated community
- Oriole, Kentucky, an unincorporated community
- Oriole, Maryland, an unincorporated community
- Oriole, Missouri, an unincorporated community

=== Canada ===
- Oriole (provincial electoral district), a provincial electoral district
- Oriole GO Station, a station in the GO Transit network located in North York, Ontario

== Sports teams ==
=== United States ===
- Baltimore Orioles, a Major League Baseball team
- Baltimore Orioles (1882–1899), an American Association and National League baseball team from 1882 to 1899
- Baltimore Orioles (1901–1902), an American League baseball team
- Baltimore Orioles (minor league), two minor league baseball teams
- Baltimore Orioles (ice hockey), a hockey team from 1932 to 1942
- Charlotte Knights, a minor league baseball team known as the Charlotte Orioles from 1976 to 1988
- Cordele Reds, a minor league baseball team known as the Americus-Cordele Orioles in 1954 and the Cordele Orioles in 1955 before folding
- Dublin Irish, a minor league baseball team known as the Dublin Orioles in 1958
- Erie Sailors, a minor league baseball team known as the Erie Orioles from 1988 to 1989
- Fitzgerald Pioneers, a minor league baseball team known as the Fitzgerald Orioles in 1957
- Gulf Coast League Orioles, a minor league baseball team
- Leesburg Athletics, a minor league baseball team known as the Leesburg Orioles from 1960 to 1961

=== Elsewhere ===
- Dominican Summer League Orioles, a Dominican minor league baseball team
- Orioles de Montréal, a Canadian junior baseball team
- West Coast Fever, formerly Perth Orioles, Western Australia's Commonwealth Bank Trophy (netball) representatives

== Naval ships ==
- USS Oriole, various United States Navy ships
- HMCS Oriole, the sail training vessel of the Canadian Forces
- HMS Oriole, two Royal Navy ships

== Aircraft ==
- Curtiss Oriole, an American general-purpose biplane first flown in 1919
- Doyle O-2 Oriole, an American parasol-wing airplane first flown in 1928

== Other uses ==
- Orioles family, a Sicilian noble family
- "Oriole" (Homeland), a 2015 episode of the TV series Homeland
- A fluorescent gel stain made by Bio-Rad for visualization and quantitation of proteins
- Oriole, a Dixon Ticonderoga pencil brand
