= Michele Catti =

Italian artist

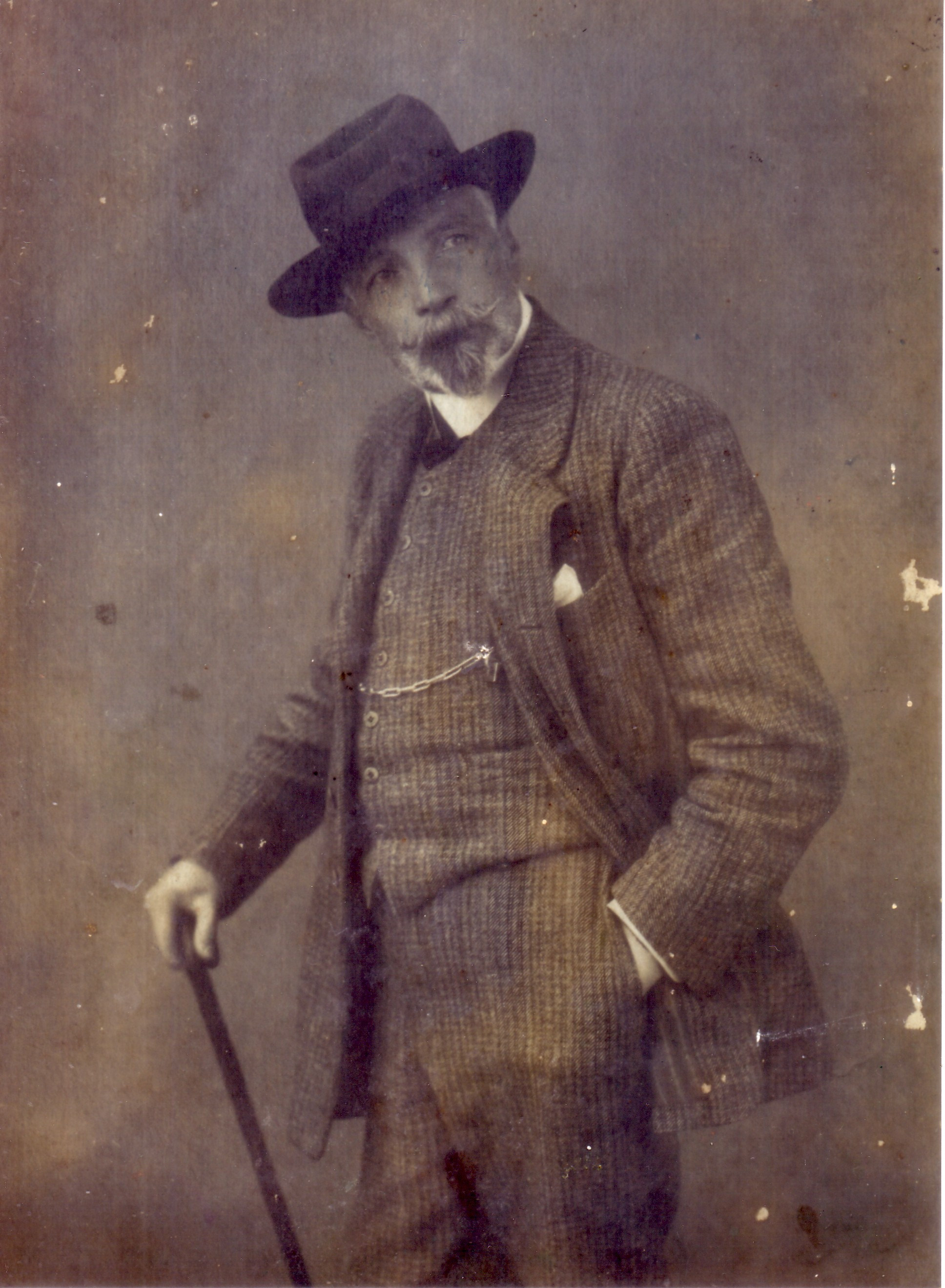
- Born: 5 April 1855; Palermo, Kingdom of Two Sicilies
- Died: 4 July 1914 (aged 59); Palermo, Kingdom of Italy
- Known for: landscape painting

Michele Catti (5 April 1855 – 4 July 1914) was an Italian artist, considered one of the most important Sicilian landscape painters of the Belle Époque.

== Biography ==
Catti was born in Palermo to Andrea Catti and Carmela Riotta. He was the second son in a family of 4 brothers and 3 sisters.

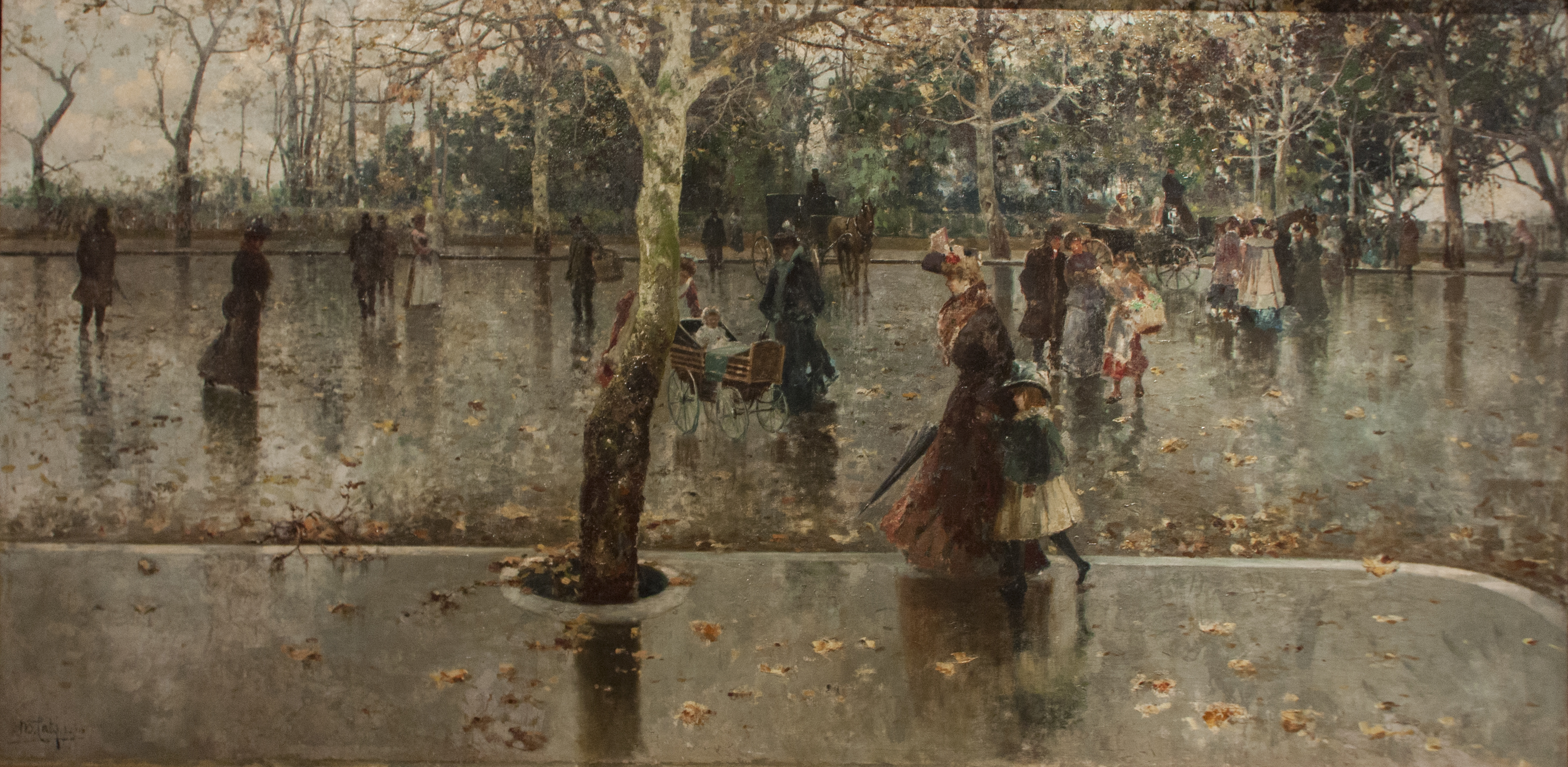
Ultime foglie (Il viale della Libertà in una giornata di pioggia). 1906. Oil on canvas, 100 x 201 cm. Collection Galleria d'arte Moderna (Palermo).

His father, born to Michele Catti the Elder and Concetta Natoli; the latter born to an aristocratic family originally from Patti, which had produced a number of judges and lawyers in the Bourbon kingdom of Sicily. Andrea, who had relocated to the town of Carini, wanted his son to also start legal studies in Palermo, and was sent him there to live with to his aunt, Sabina Distefano. Michele, however, while in Palermo, abandoned the study of law. In anger, his father ceased to support Michele financially and ceased communicating with his son. Nonetheless, his aunt continued to host and nourish him. His father's cousin Luigi Natoli, who would become famous himself as a writer under the pseudonym William Galt and also an important patron for Michele in this period.

Soon however Catti tried, by writing to his father's influential friends, to re-establish contact with him and in the end some friends made him reconcile with his son. Despite the fact that the relationship between the two remained difficult, his father arranged for his son to start working as a clerk at the court of Palermo. This work was a restraint for a bohemian like him. During this time he spent a great deal of time with Luigi Natoli, who encouraged him in his painting and introduced him to the Palermo salons of the wealthy Florio, Lanza and Trabia families and studios of the main artistic personalities of the time. The young Michele Catti, brilliant and extrovert, gained the esteem of the painter Francesco Lojacono, the foremost Sicilian landscape artist in this period, who took him in as a pupil. Catti initially followed the lessons of the Lojacono with great enthusiasm and, distinguished for his talent and disposition, became his student. But tired of focusing on technical painting and the sensitivity of Lojacono, he soon moved on.

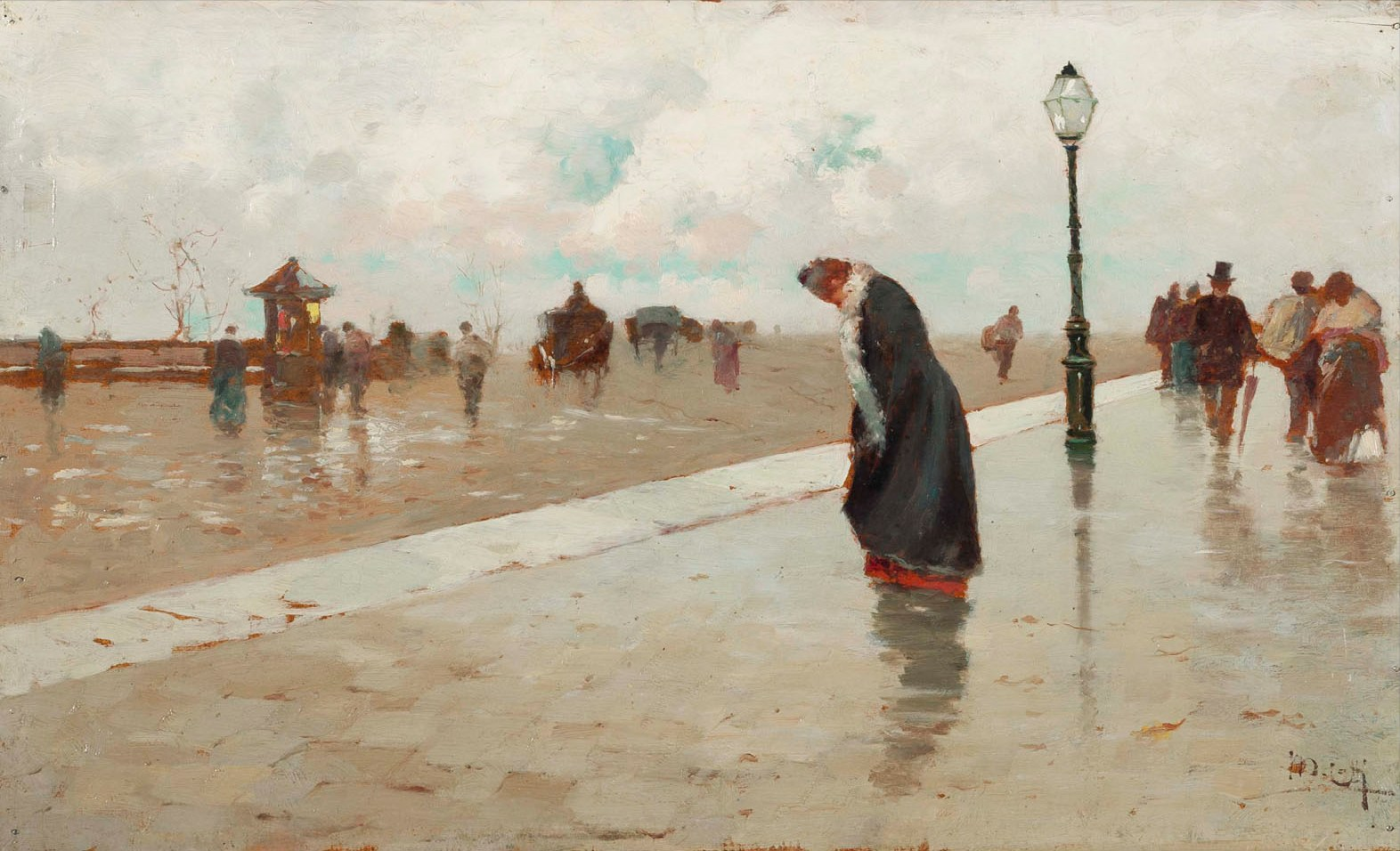
Tempo piovoso. Undated. Oil on wood, 41 x 24 cm, private collection.

Around 1875, Catti met the artist Vincenzo Ragusa, who had just returned to Palermo with his wife, artist O'Tama, from Japan, where he had opened a painting school that had been very successful. He immediately hit it off with him, and enthusiastic about the many Japanese components he had introduced in his art, they planned to open a school together, but the sad economic situation and the precarious state of his health prevented this. In 1875 Catti decided to participate in the exhibition organized in Montevergini, for the Congress of Scientists held in Palermo. Catti, unknown to anyone, prepared a work especially for the exhibition, Burrasca d’autunno, a canvas of 50 x 80 cm. His painting was considered one of the most beautiful works of the exhibition and one of the men who bestowed him with such compliments was Francesco Lojacono.

At the inauguration all the nobility of Palermo was present, accompanying the honored guests Prince Umberto of Savoy and Margherita along with other personalities. Umberto, after being introduced by Prince Ferdinando Monroy, gave him his hand and said, "You are from Palermo. It is good that you honor your homeland." After a short conversation Umberto bought the painting. He also received a flattering appraisal by the French painter and sculptor Jean-Léon Gérôme, who said during the exhibition that Catti was a revelation.

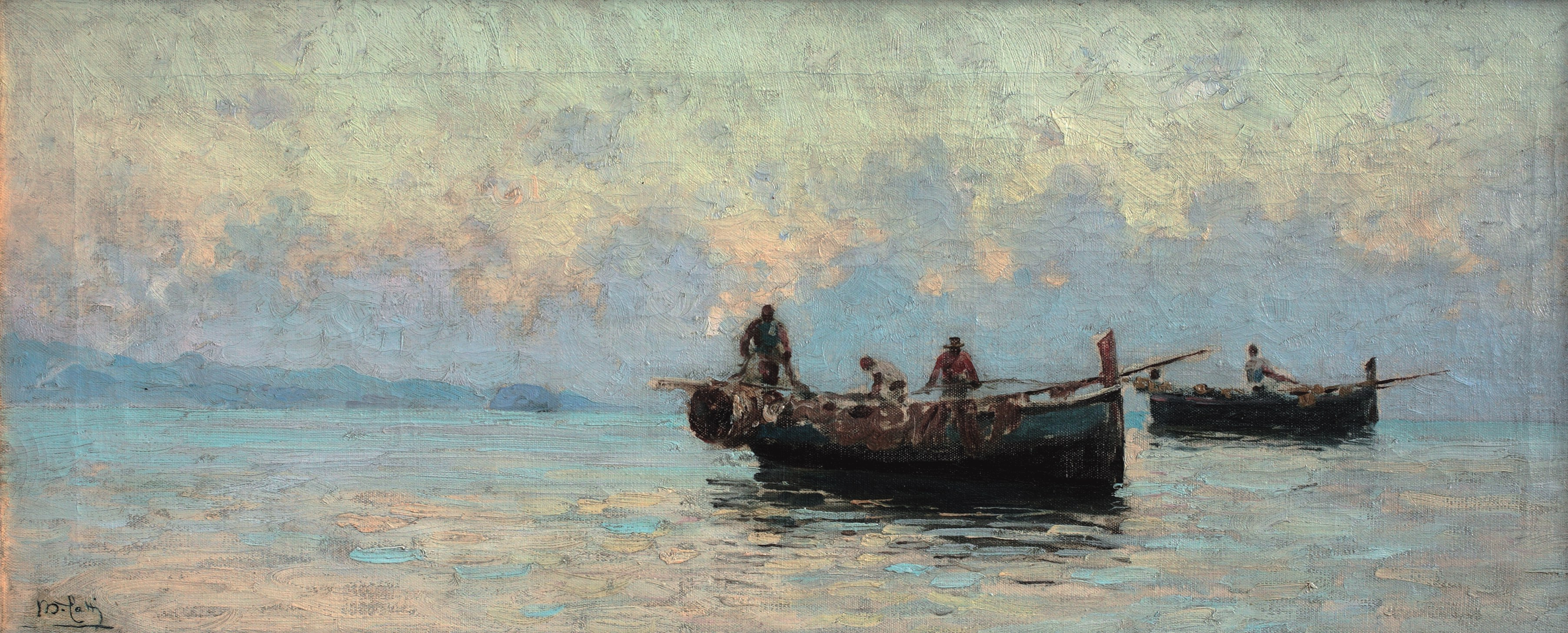
Marina. Undated. Oil on canvas, 30 x 67 cm. Private collection.

In 1881 he participated in the Fine Arts Exhibition of the Milan National Exhibition with the seascape Crepuscolo. Nonetheless, Michele Catti took only one trip outside of Sicily in his whole life. Together with Luigi Natoli, he went to Rome in 1883. There the painter Francesco Paolo Michetti, admiring his paintings, invited him to work in his studio, but Catti appears to have declined. He went back after several months with the conviction of devoting himself entirely to painting the reality of Sicily.

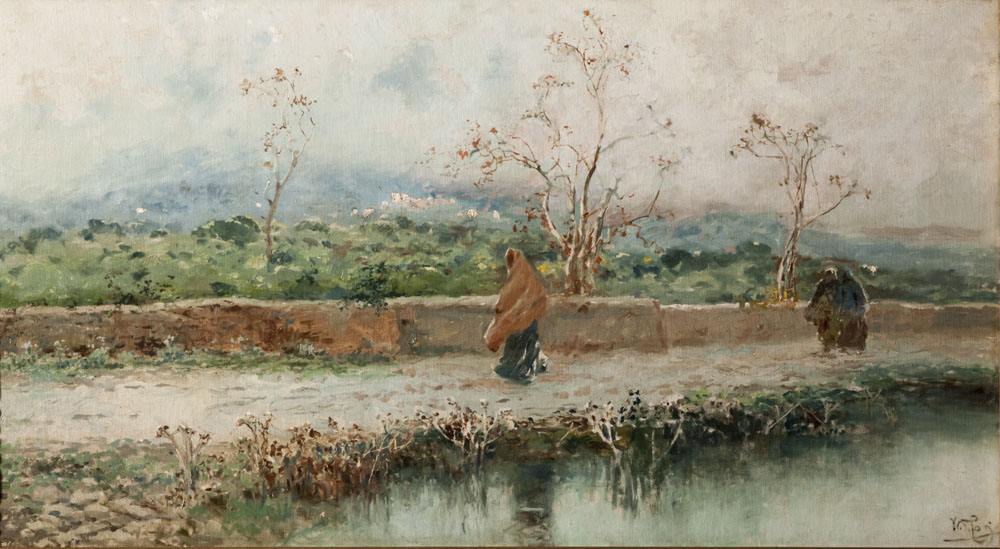
Vento e nebbia. Undated. Oil on wood, 68,5 x 131 cm. Private collection.

Returning to Palermo, he married Maria Anna Contarini, of a marquesal family originally from Venice, on 7 April 1888. From this marriage came four children: Ugo, Carmela, Laura and Aurelio. Unfortunately the economic situation in Sicily following the Risorgimento was dire and this affected the Catti family as well.

After 1885, Catti abandoned his realistic approach, to an impressionism possibly inspired by the works of Antonio Leto, characterized by a wide and sparse brushstroke. In 1891 he exhibited again in Milan and at the Promotrice in Palermo, where he also exhibited in 1893. In 1892 he painted Castel di Tusa and in 1896 he obtained a personal success at the exhibition held at the Circolo Artico di Palermo with the paintings Estate, Primavera, Autunno e Inverno (the 4 seasons). He held a personal exhibition in 1898 and in 1900 he exhibited at the Belle Arti exhibition at the Teatro Massimo.

Catti also had a pupil, Erminio Kremp, with whom he spent many hours in the osteria drinking. His friendship with Kremp was important in his life as a man and artist. Apart from Kremp he had many noble Palermitan friends who appreciated him, besides his artistic talent, for his remarkable qualities: he was, in fact, a brilliant, generous and pleasant man in gatherings. Testimony to his sociability and charisma, the Prince of Trabia regularly organized balls in his honor or following his successes at various exhibitions, and Prince Tasca Lanza could often be found at Catti's home.

Catti exhibited in Palermo and also outside the island, but he had little contact with artists from other regions, although his works include typical techniques and manners of the Tuscan Macchiaioli painters and the Impressionists themselves. Meeting and befriending painter Giuseppe De Nittis was therefore important to Catti, as he could talk of his French experiences and the local art movements.

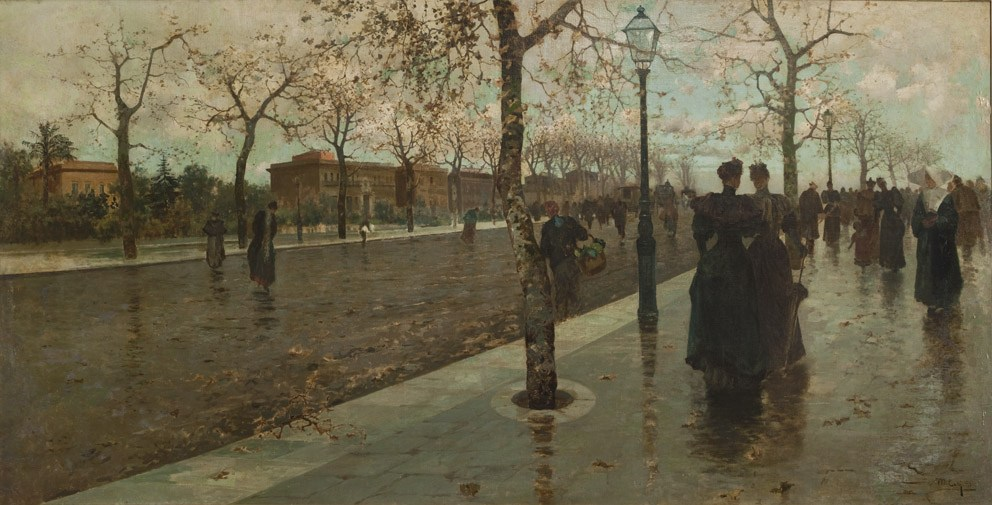
Viale della Libertà. 1895. Oil on canvas, 97 x 198 cm. Collection Circolo Artistico Palermo.

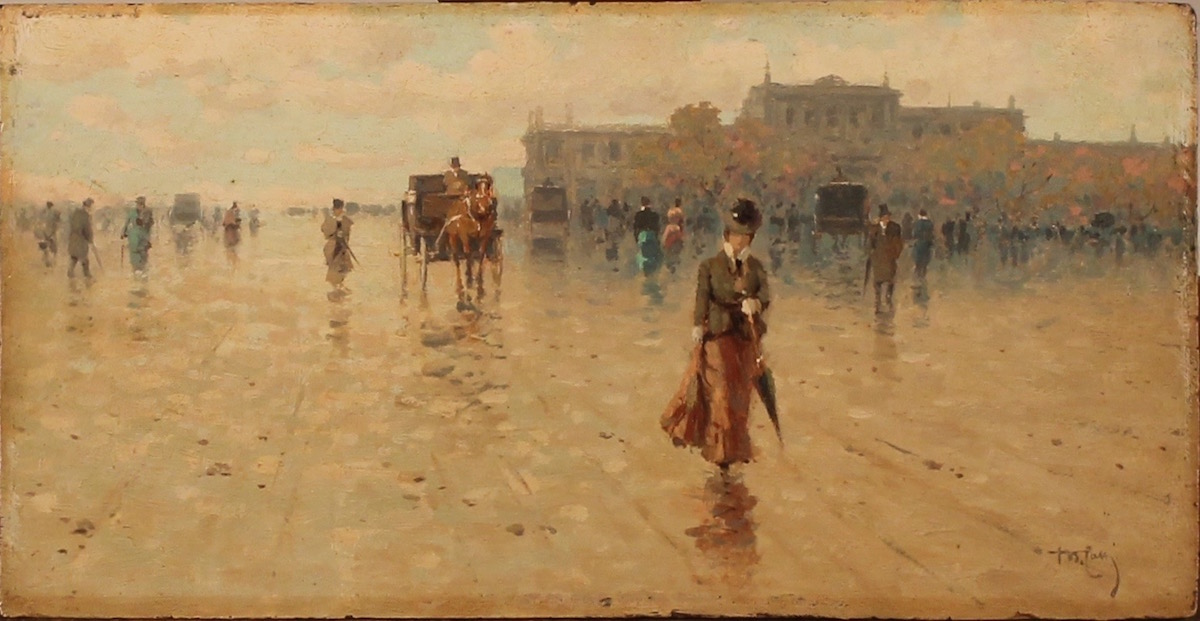
Autunno a Palermo. Undated. Oil on canvas, 31 x 16 cm. Private collection

His most mature works, characterized by a smooth brushstroke and a robust and vibrant style, are from the early twentieth-century: he appreciated sad autumn atmospheres, gray skies, and cold windy days, which he portrayed with dim and melancholic tones. In 1901 he composed Donna a passeggio, in 1903 Paesaggio paludoso, in 1906 Via Libertà and Donna che raccoglie i fiori, in 1908 Scogli a riva, in 1910 Alberi a riva, Barche, Marina con scogli. Organized by Edoardo Alfano, he held a large personal exhibition in 1910 in Palermo where thirty-six of his works were presented. In 1911 he was awarded the gold medal at the National Exhibition of Rome for the picture Ultime foglie (Il viale della Libertà in una giornata di pioggia) of 1906.

In his last years his health became very bad and his eyesight worsened to such extent that he was no longer able to paint. Michele Catti died on July 4, 1914, in Palermo. Apart from his works in Palermo's Galleria d'Arte Moderna, the Fondazione Sicilia at Villa Zito and numerous galleries, most of Catti's works remain in private collections, primarily in Palermo, Sicily - his homeland, as Prince Umberto of Savoy said in 1875.

== Exhibitions ==
- Exhibited at Palermo (exhibition of Montevergini) of 'Burrasca d'autunno', bought by Prince Umberto of Savoy, 1875
- Exhibited and rewarded at Palermo, 1876
- Exhibited at Naples, 1877
- Participated in an exhibition in Naples, 1887
- Participated in the National Exhibition of Turin, 1880
- Participated in the National Exhibition of Milan, 1881
- Participated in the National Exhibition of Palermo, 1891
- Exhibited at the Promotrice of Palermo, 1893
- Exhibited at Circolo Artistico, Palermo, 1896
- Exhibited in Palermo, 1898
- Participated in the exhibition of the Belle Arti in Teatro Massimo, 1900
- Exhibited in Palermo, 1910
- Exhibition in Palermo, 1929
- Exhibition in Rome, 1953
- Exhibition in Palermo at the Whitaker Foundation, 1982
- Exhibition in Agrigento, Complesso Chiaramontano, 2001
- Exhibition in Agrigento, Complesso Chiaramontano, 2007
- Exhibition in Palermo, Galleria Beatrice, 2011
- Exhibition in Palermo, Fondazione Sant'Elia, 2013

== Selected works ==
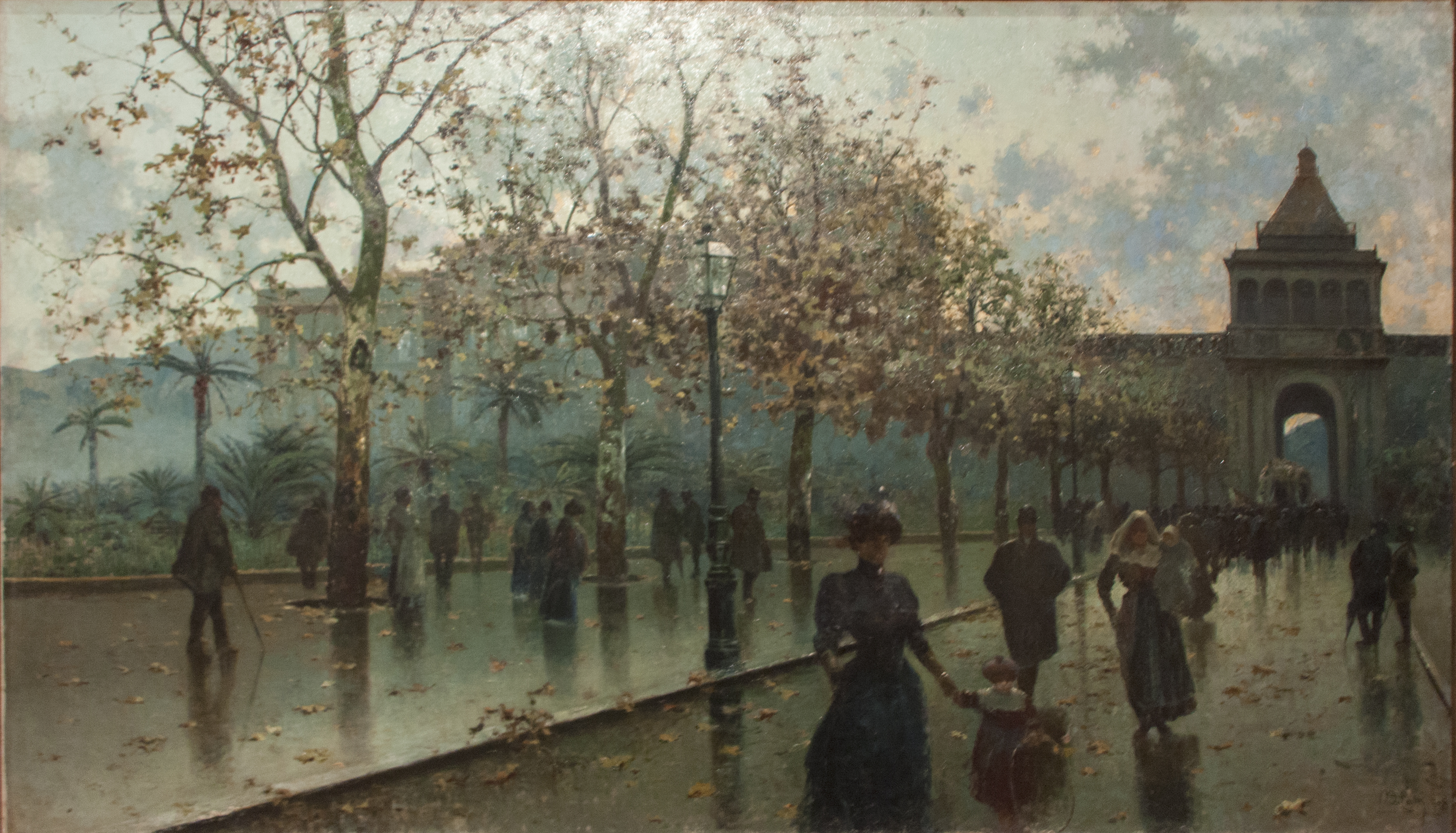
Porta Nuova. 1908. Oil on canvas, 113 x 198 cm, collection Galleria d'Arte Moderna (Palermo).

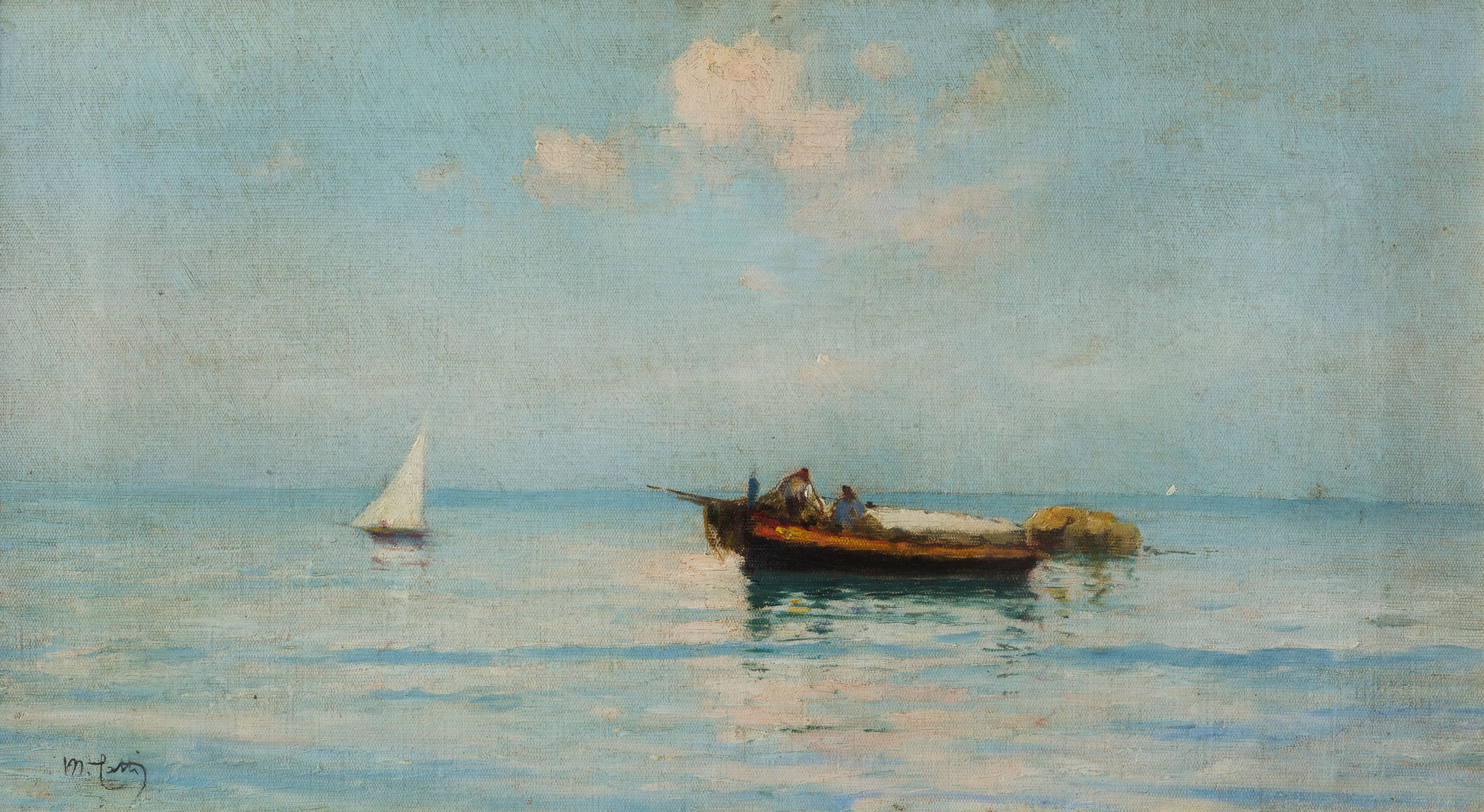
Marina con barca e pescatori. Undated. Oil on canvas, 29 x 53 cm, private collection.

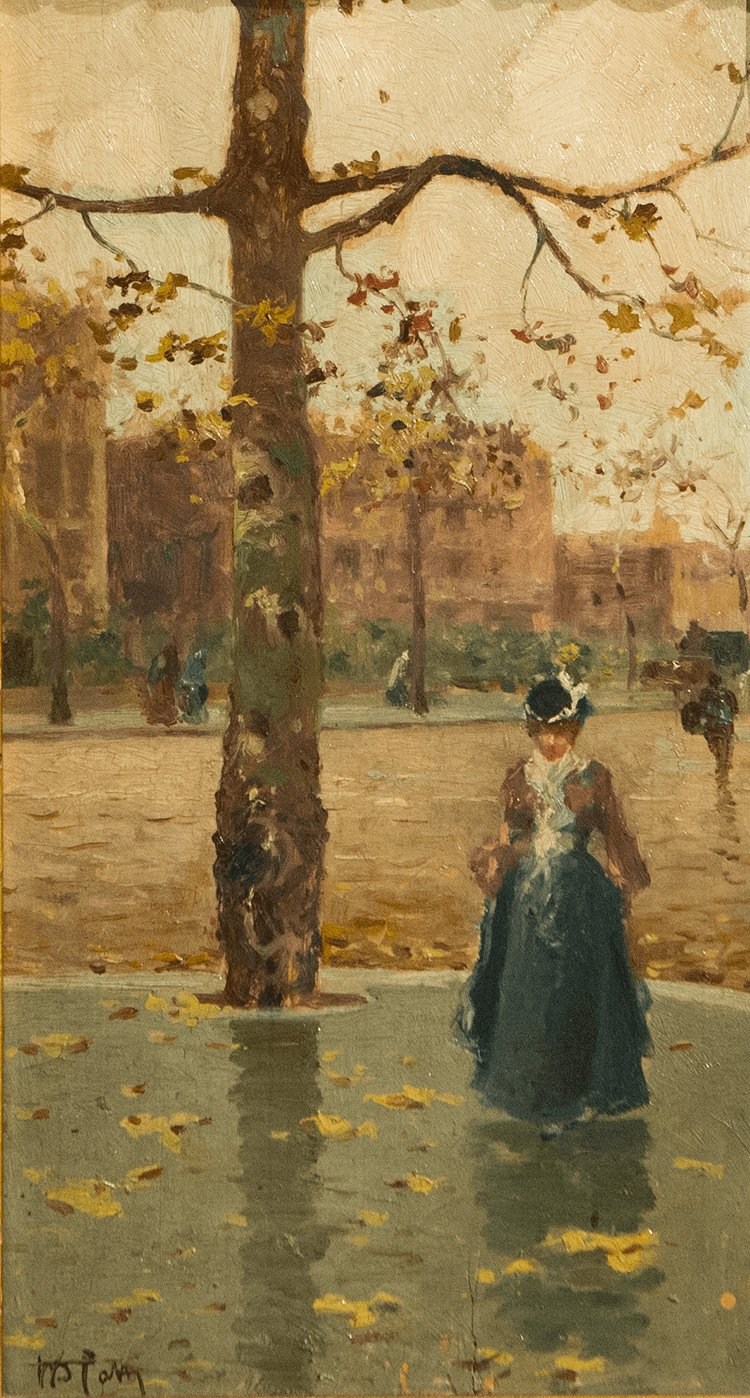
Scorcio di via Libertà. Ca. 1900-1910. Oil on canvas, 37 x 28 cm, collection Fondazione Sicilia.

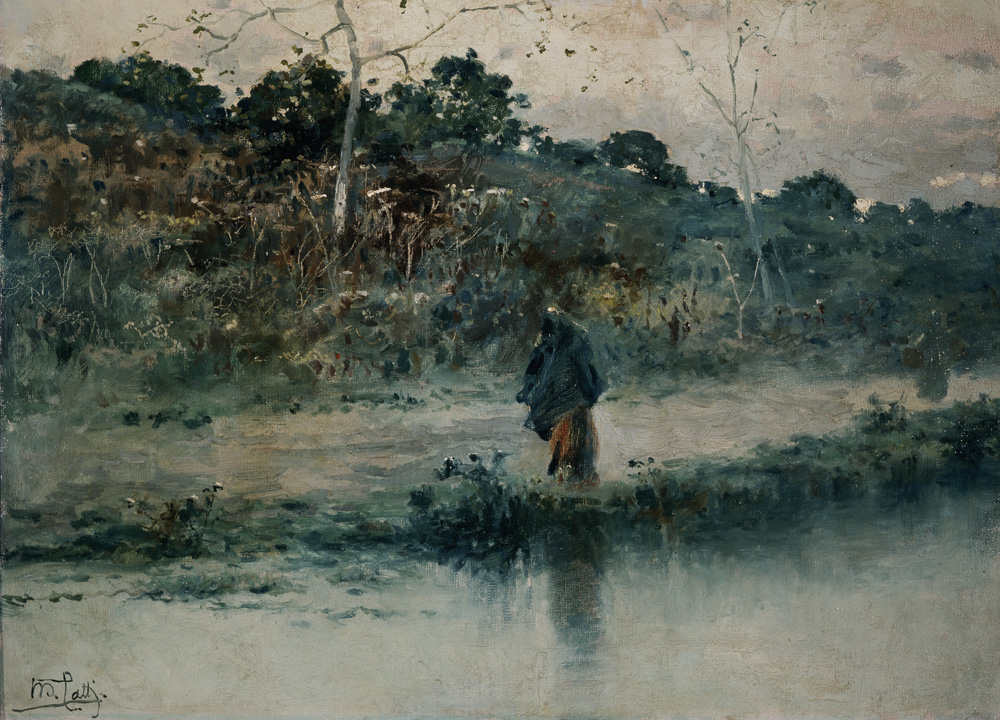
Autunno. Ca. 1905-1910, oil on wood, 36 x 49 cm, collection Galleria d'Arte Moderna (Palermo).

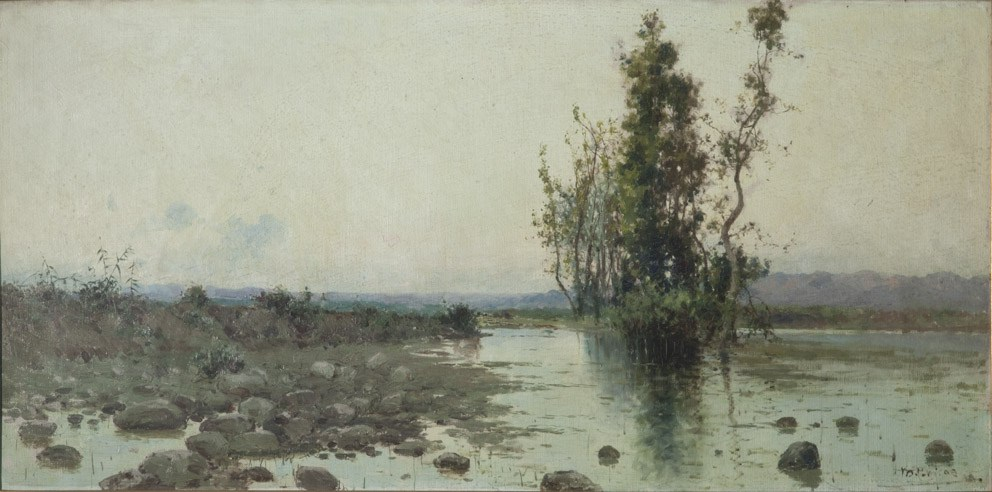
Paesaggio paludoso. 1903. Oil on canvas, 36 x 75 cm, private collection.

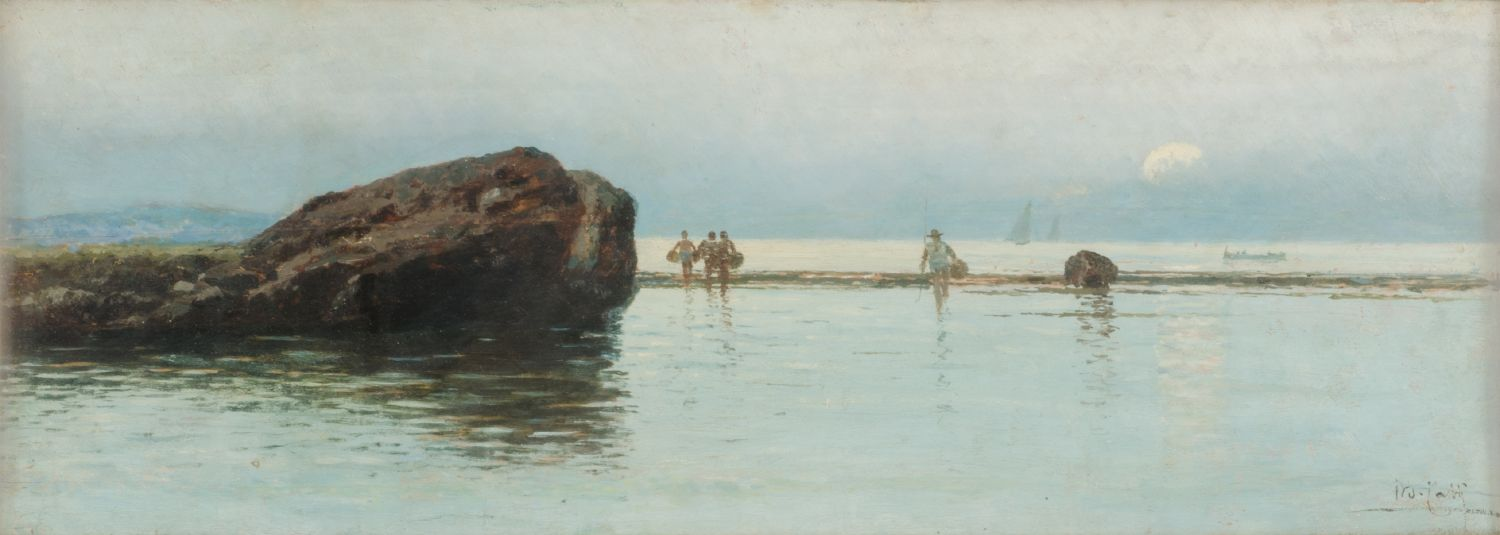
Paesaggio marino con scogli e personaggi. Undated. Oil on wood, 58 x 20 cm, private collection.

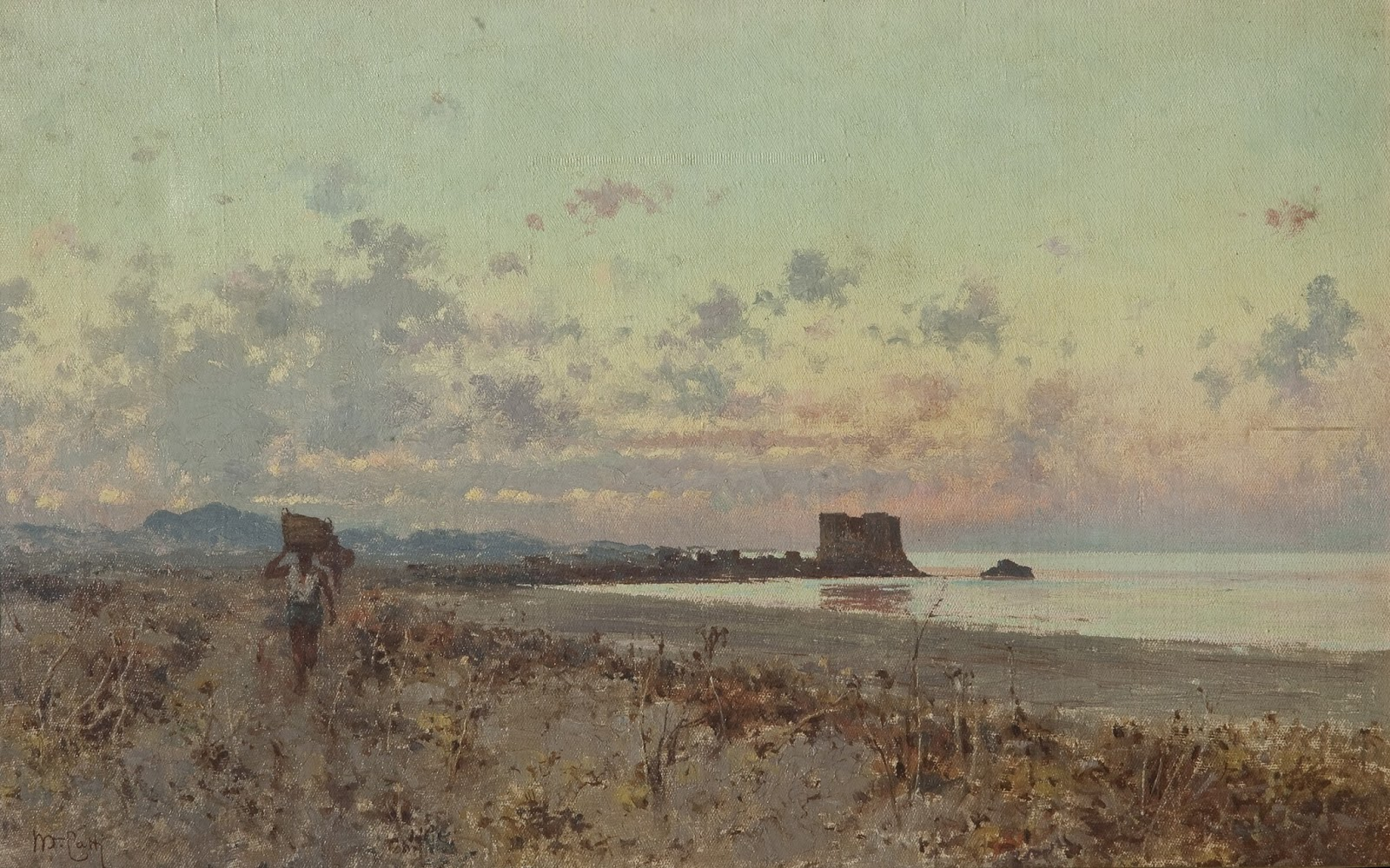
Castel di Tusa. Undated. Oil on canvas, 29 x 49 cm, private collection.

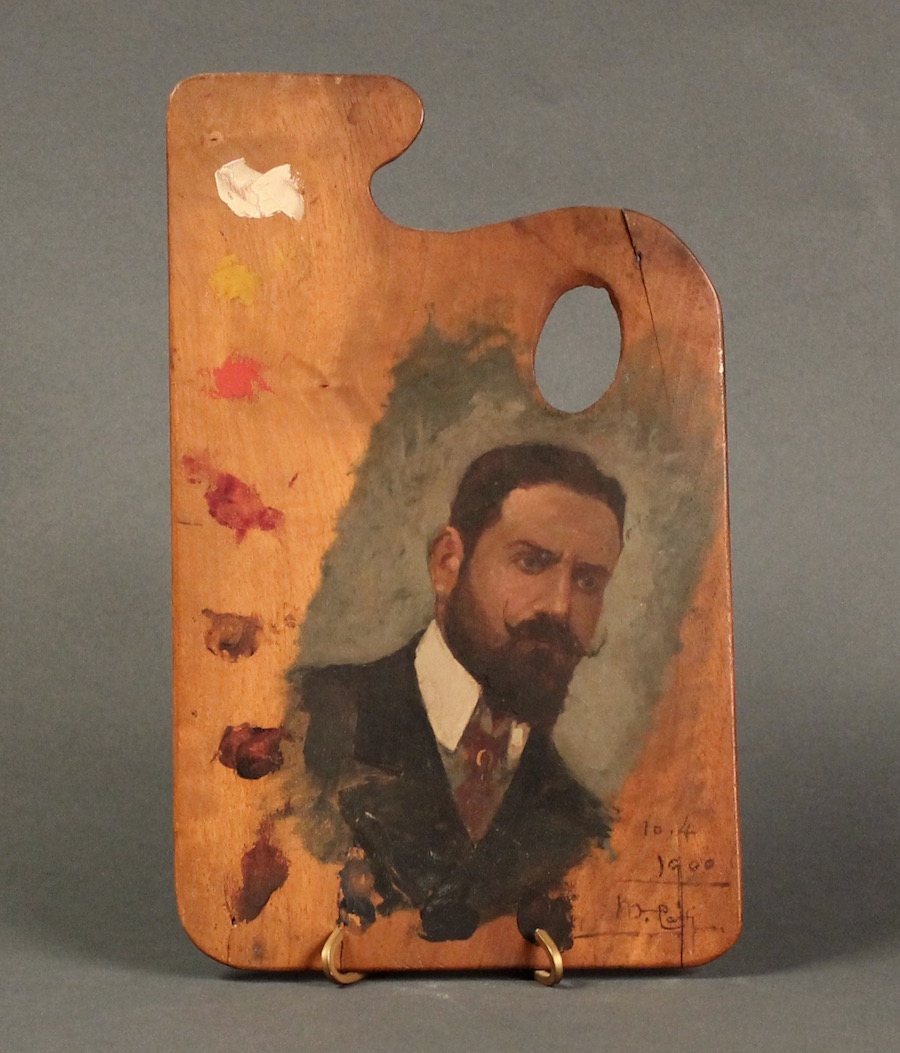
Autoritratto a 45 anni. April 10, 1900. Oil on palette, private collection.
