= Montagnareale =

- Comune
- Comune di Montagnareale
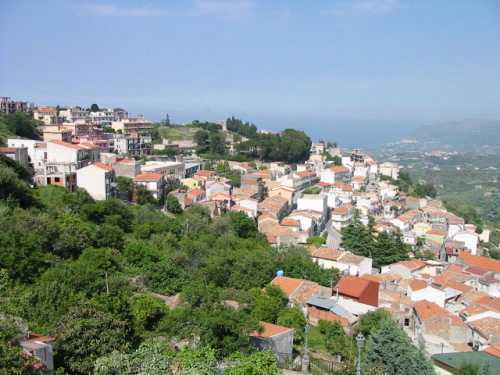

- Location of Montagnareale in Italy Montagnareale (Sicily)
- Coordinates: 38°8′N 14°57′E
- Country: Italy
- Region: Sicily
- Metropolitan city: Messina (ME)
- Frazioni: San Nicolella

Government
  - Mayor: Salvatore Sidoti

Area
  - Total: 16.2 km^{2} (6.3 sq mi)
- Elevation: 300 m (980 ft)

Population (30 September 2025)
  - Total: 1,341
  - Density: 82.8/km^{2} (214/sq mi)
- Demonym: Montagnarealesi
- Time zone: UTC+1 (CET)
  - Summer (DST): UTC+2 (CEST)
- Postal code: 98060
- Dialing code: 0941
- Patron saint: St. Anthony the Abbot
- Saint day: 17 January
- Website: www.comune.montagnareale.me.it

Montagnareale (Sicilian: Muntagnariali) is a comune (municipality) in the Metropolitan City of Messina in the Italian region Sicily, located about 140 kilometres (87 mi) east of Palermo and about 50 kilometres (31 mi) west of Messina.

Montagnareale borders the following municipalities: Gioiosa Marea, Librizzi, Patti, Sant'Angelo di Brolo.

The town is located on the northern Nebrodi in the Saracen mountain group and shares the hill with the hamlet of Patti, Sorrentini.

== Geography ==
It is a small town in the Nebrodi mountains, with around 1,800 inhabitants, located on a hill about 300 m above sea level and surrounded by the lush greenery of the mountains and the blue of the sea and sky, overlooking the gulf of Patti.

== History ==
The first traces of settlements almost certainly date back to the Greek period, as evidenced by archaeological finds and the toponymy of some localities (Agatirsi, Piraino). The first significant urban nucleus arose in the early 17th century and was originally called Casale della Montagna and was under the control of Patti.

The prosperity achieved, thanks to livestock farming, fig and chestnut cultivation, and the thriving silk and linen industry, prompted the inhabitants, who had long resented Patti's rule, to secede from Patti. Thus, thanks to the help of a nobleman from Messina, Don Ascanio Ansalone, who paid a ransom of 4,000 ducats, the Casale della Montagna obtained emancipation in 1636 and took the name Montagna Regia or Reale. Later, Don Ascanio Ansalone himself took possession of the village with the title of Duke. It was under the rule of the Ansalone family first and then the Vianisi family that Montagnareale developed economically and demographically.

== Monuments and places of interest ==
=== Religious architecture ===
- Church of the Madonna Santissima delle Grazie can be reached from Via Rovere.
- Church of Santa Caterina is located in the square of the same name in the northern part of town.
- Church of San Sebastiano, on the other hand, is located in the upper part of the village, in the green area of a park.

=== Civil architecture ===
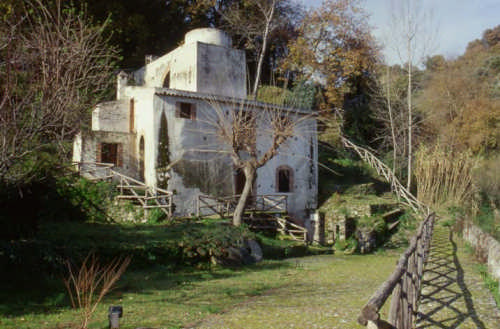
Mulino di Capo

- Mulino di Capo is the ancient watermill, the only one of its kind still in operation in the area, is also home to the town museum.
- War Memorial – Dedicated to Captain Pilot Gioacchino Aragona on the 70th anniversary of their birth. The monument is located at the entrance to the Montagnareale cemetery.

=== Natural area ===
- Pineta di Rocca Saracena is a charming location of extraordinary panoramic beauty, about 5 km from the town centre and extends over an area of over 70 hectares, at an altitude of about 800–900 metres.
