= Andrea Tummiolo =

Italian footballer (born 1984)

Personal information
- Date of birth: 20 March 1984 (age 42)
- Place of birth: Sciacca, Italy
- Height: 1.82 m (6 ft 0 in)
- Position: Midfielder

Team information
- Current team: Igea Virtus

Senior career*
Years	Team	Apps	(Gls)
2003	Ragusa	15	(0)
2004–2007	Messina	2	(0)
2004–2005	→ Acireale (loan)	18	(0)
2007–2008	Valenzana	20	(0)
2008–	Igea Virtus		
- * Club domestic league appearances and goals

Andrea Tummiolo (born 20 March 1984) is an Italian former footballer who played for Igea Virtus.
