= HMS Oriole =

HMS Oriole may refer to the following ships of the Royal Navy

- HMS Oriole (1916), an Admiralty M-class destroyer
- PS Eagle III, a paddle steamer used as a minesweeper, designated as HMS Oriole from 1939–1946

== See also ==
- HMCS Oriole
- USS Oriole
- Oriole (disambiguation)
