= Sicilian Peasant Telling an American Officer Which Way the Germans Had Gone =

1943 photograph by Robert Capa

Sicilian Peasant Telling an American Officer Which Way the Germans Had Gone (Sperlinga, 1943) by Robert Capa

Sicilian Peasant Telling an American Officer Which Way the Germans Had Gone. Near Troina. Italy. August 1943 is a black and white photograph taken by Robert Capa in Sicily on 4 August 1943. Capa had come to Sicily in late July 1943 to document the Allies invasion of the Italian island and took many photographs related to the conflict, presenting the American soldiers, the German invaders, the Italian partisans and the civilian population.

== Description ==
Capa had already photographed a large amount of material related to the ongoing invasion of Sicily, when he took this photograph, in Sperlinga, near Troina, on 4 August 1943. It went to become one of his most popular and the most emblematic from the group taken during the Sicily campaign.

The photograph depicts in the foreground an old Sicilian peasant, dressed in traditional clothing, talking to a young American soldier, who listens, in a crouched position, while he points with his cane to the direction where the Germans have gone. The old man does not hide his enthusiasm in helping the liberators of his island, while the soldier listens with interest. There is a certain complicity between both men, despite their differences in age and origin. In the large background, there is a Mediterranean landscape, with grazing land and some trees.

== Public collections ==
There are prints of the photograph at the International Center of Photography, in New York, and at the Hood Museum of Art, Dartmouth College, in Hanover, New Hampshire.
