= Vinciguerra d'Aragona =

Vinciguerra d'Aragona was the eldest son of Sanciolo d'Aragona and Lucia Palizzi. His father was an illegitimate son of Frederick II of Sicily.

In 1355 he rebelled against his cousin Frederick III, who in December sent him to Patti as Captain to serve until December 1356. With Guerao Gullielm De Sidot and Corrado Spadafora, the captain and castellan of Lipari, he joined his younger brother Sancho (Sanciolo) in a pro-Angevin revolt in 1357. In March 1359 he fell out with Anjou and helped his cousin the king put down what remained of the insurrection. He was rewarded with the lordship of Termini and the county of Novara, which had been his maternal grandfather's, in 1364. From his nephew Mattiotto, the son of Sancho, he inherited the county of Cammarata in 1369. In 1371 he became Baron of Militello, his own father's barony, and San Marco. From 1365 to 1368 he acted as Grand Chancellor of Sicily, replacing Enrico Rosso. He left as his heir his son Bartholomew.

A fortress Vinciguerra built in 1366, the Torre Vinciguerra, in Gioiosa Marea, still bears his name; he also built a castle on the top of Gioiosa Guardia.

== Sources ==
- Ghisalberti, Alberto M., ed. Dizionario Biografico degli Italiani: III Ammirato – Arcoleo. Rome, 1961.
