= Gianforte =

Gianforte is both a surname and a given name. Notable people with the name include:

- Greg Gianforte (born 1961), American politician and businessman
- Gianforte Natoli (died 1633), 17th-century Sicilian noble, also known as Giovanni Natoli
