= Palazzo Natoli =

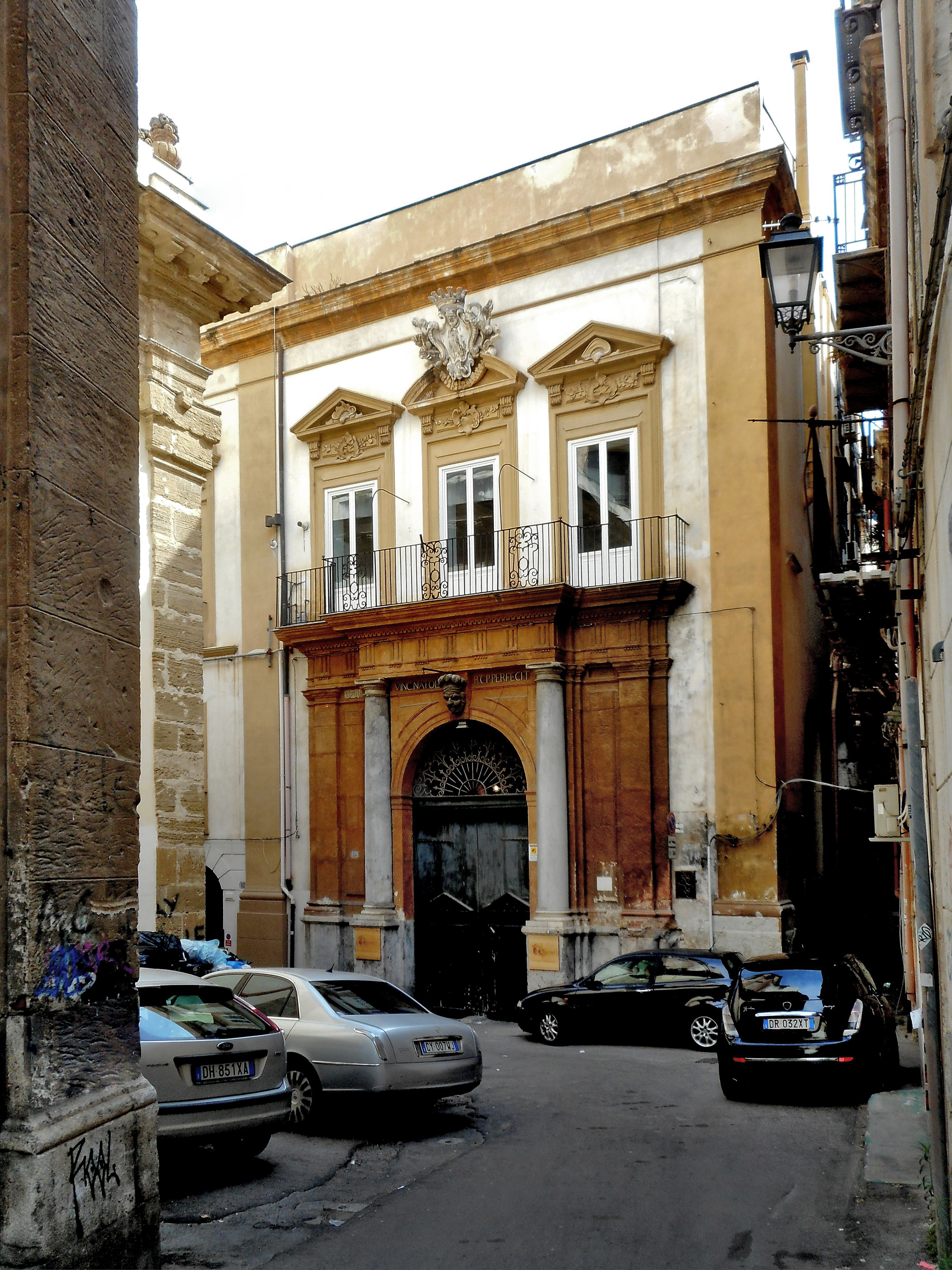
- Interactive map of Palazzo Natoli

General information
- Architectural style: Baroque
- Location: Palermo, Italy
- Coordinates: 38.11435°N 13.35905°E
- Completed: 1765

Palazzo Natoli is a Baroque palace in Palermo, in the Mediterranean island of Sicily. It was built by Vincenzo Natoli in 1765. It has a fine entrance on via S. Salvatore, and frescoes by Gioacchino Martorana.
