= USD Ragusa 2014 =

Italian football club

Ragusa
- Full name: Unione Sportiva Dilettantistica Ragusa 2014
- Founded: 1940; 2008 (refounded); 2014 (refounded)
- Ground: Stadio Aldo Campo, Ragusa, Italy
- Capacity: 4,500
- Chairman: Nicola D'Amico
- Manager: Filippo Raciti
- League: Serie D
- 2025–26: Serie D/I, 13th (qualified for relegation play-off)
Home colours	Away colours

Unione Sportiva Dilettantistica Ragusa 2014 is an Italian association football club located in Ragusa, Sicily. It currently plays in Serie D.

== History ==
=== U.S. Ragusa ===
The football in Ragusa arrived before the foundation of this company, in 1949: since the '30s there were at least 2 teams FUCI and Junior, who played at the stadium ENAL (built in 1928 and inaugurated with a match between national teams of Ragusa and Rosolini finished 2–1 for the Ragusa).

There are reports in the 1940–1941 season with a team that bore the name of the city and fighting in Prima Divisione (one level below the Series C).

For nearly thirty years the U.S. Ragusa has played in Serie D and Promozione Regionale, but in 1977 came the breakthrough: the Azzurri won Serie D and were promoted to Serie C. For four years represented the team in the semi-professionals: the first season came 17th (step in Serie C2), the second 16th, 9th in the third and 18th in the final season in 1980–81, which marked the return to Serie D.

In Serie C2 returned only in the 2001–02 season, with winning Girone I of Serie D. In 2003, Ragusa was saved and finished at 13th place in the group C. In 2004 came 15th and was forced to play the play-out, winning against Castel di Sangro. In 2005 finished the season once again in 15th place, but this time lost to Taranto to the playoffs, and relegated to Serie D.

In 2005–06 the Ragusa came in ninth place in the Girone I of Serie D, after a year full of troubles.

On 12 July 2007, the company declares bankruptcy due to lack of funds, and debts that would reach 500,000 euros.

=== A.S.D. Ragusa Calcio ===
After his bankruptcy the team of Pozzallo, played in the regional championship of Promozione, by acquiring the title of Pozzallo Ragusa-Dubrovnik, and moved to playing its home games at the Stadio Aldo Campo di Ragusa. In 2008, the merger between the companies "-Pozzallo Ragusa" and "Ragusa '90" born the new company called A.S.D. Ragusa Calcio, who played in the championship of the season for Eccellenza Sicily 2008–2009.

==== Serie D and amateur leagues ====
In the season 2011–12 the team was promoted from Eccellenza Sicily to Serie D after 5 years. The next season Ragusa finished 15th, after beating A.C. Palazzolo. In January 2014 it was excluded from Serie D after 20 match days for renouncing to play four games, and subsequently folded. For the 2014–15 season the club was refounded as USD Ragusa and joined Promozione Sicily. The club returned to Eccellenza in 2017, then relegated back to Promozione in 2018, then promoted back to Eccellenza in 2019.

In the 2021–22 season, Ragusa won the regional Coppa Italia Dilettanti tournament, defeating Mazara in the final, and successively won the Eccellenza title on 10 April 2022, with one game left to go, thus ensuring themselves their return to Serie D after eight years.

== Colors and badge ==
Its colors are blue and white.

== Honours ==
=== U.S. Ragusa ===
Serie D

- Champions: 1976–77, 2001–02

=== A.S.D. Ragusa Calcio ===
Eccellenza Sicily

- Champions: 2011–12

=== U.S.D. Ragusa 2014 ===
Eccellenza Sicily

- Champions: 2021–22

Coppa Italia Dilettanti Sicilia

- Champions: 2021–22

== Notable former managers ==
- (Italy) Pasquale Marino

== Former players ==
- Emanuele Curcio
- Andrea Tummiolo
