= Palazzo Branciforte, Palermo =

Historic palace in Palermo, Italy

Coordinates: 38.12140°N 13.36229°E

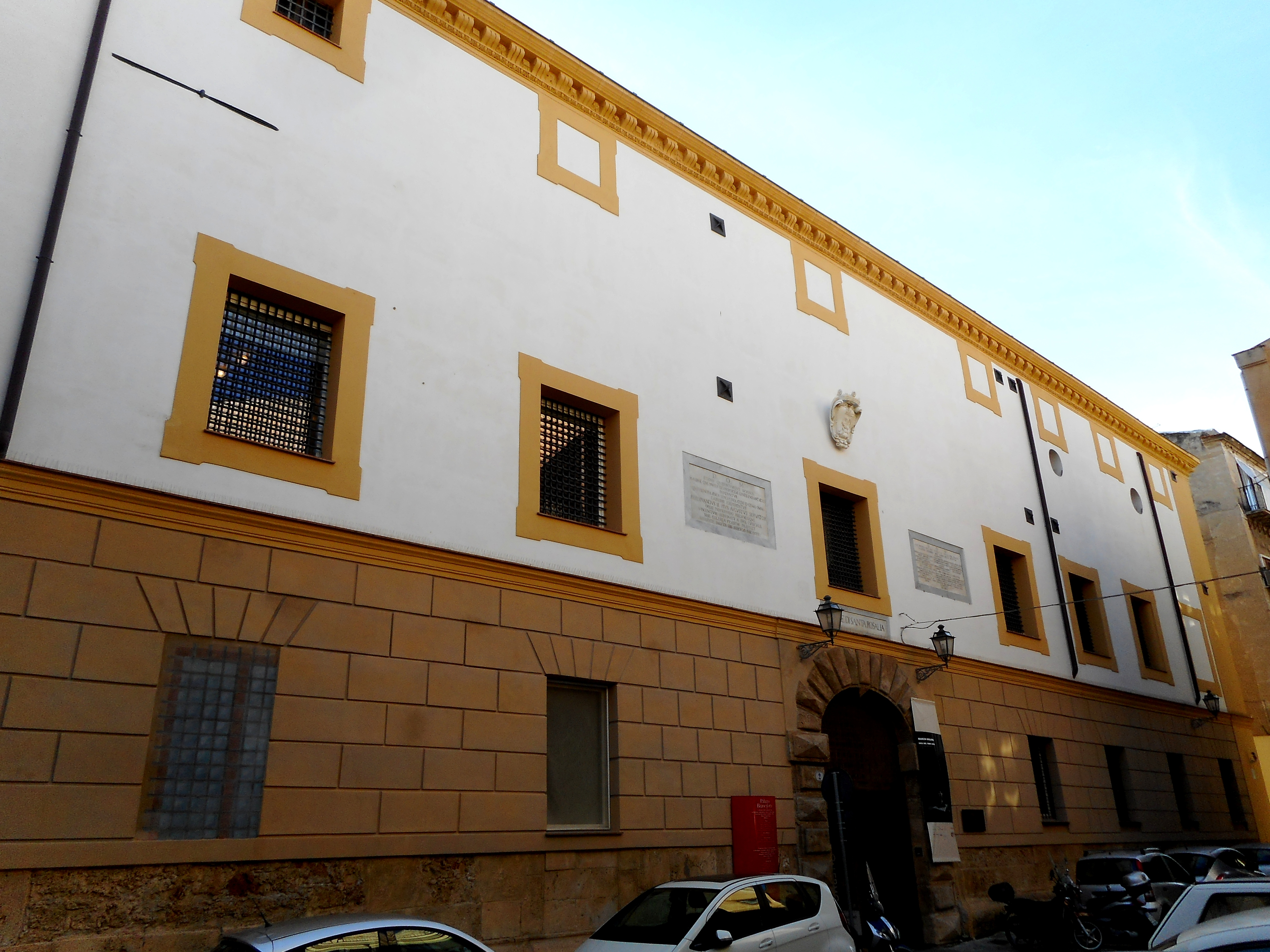
Exterior facade

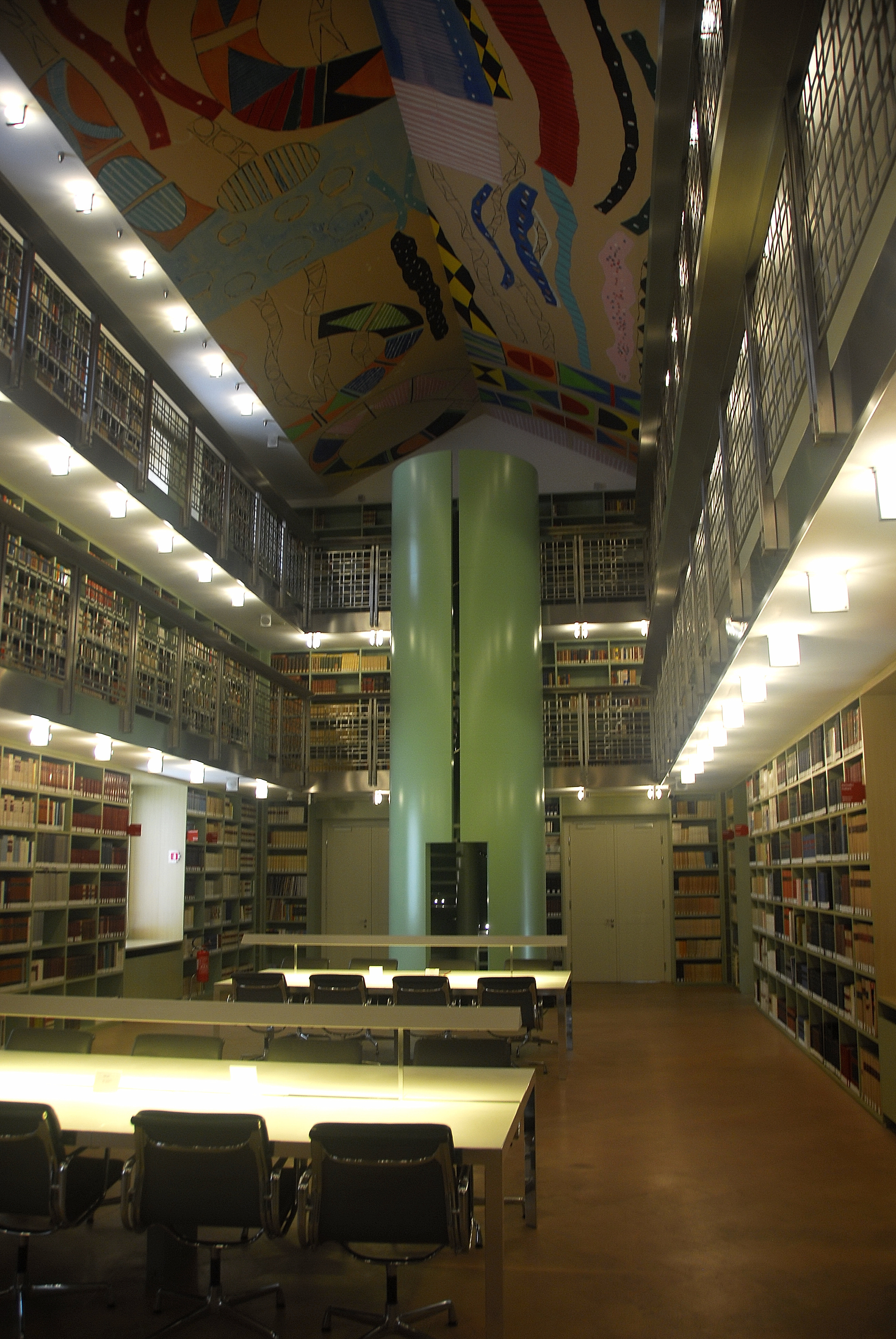
Interior of modern library with ceiling fresco by Ignazio Moncada di Paternò

The Palazzo Branciforte is Renaissance-style aristocratic palace located on Via Bara dell'Olivella, in the historic center of Palermo, region of Sicily, Italy. It underwent extensive refurbishment under the direction of the architect Gae Aulenti, and since completion of the work in 2012 has been the home of the Fondazione Sicilia, and houses a modern library, auditorium, and exhibition halls.

== History ==
In the 1500s, the massive palace, encompassing nearly an entire city block, was initially built as the home of the Branciforte and Lanza family. In the 18th-century, it was inherited by the Branciforte di Butera family, who ceded the palace in 1801 to the Senate of Palermo. The Senate converted the structure into the Monte di Santa Rosalia, a home for the indigent of Palermo. The charity was funded by a Monte della Pietà per la Pignorazione, a Monte dei Pegni or pawn shop establishment.

The building was heavily damaged by a fire during the Sicilian revolution of 1848. In 1929, it was acquired by the Cassa di Risparmio Siciliana. The building was again damaged during the aerial bombardments of World War II. It continued functioning as a pawn-shop until the 1980s. In 2005, it was acquired by the Fondazione Banco di Sicilia, who led to the refurbishment and present use. The Fondazione Sicilia uses the palace to display its collections of archaeological artifacts, coins, stamps, tin-glazed pottery (maiolica), sculpture and frescoes on panel. The main painting collection of the Foundation is on display in Villa Zito. The Foundation also has a collection of Sicilian puppets made by the Cuticchio family, along with the theatrical scenes. It contains a local cooking school and restaurant sponsored by Gambero Rosso.
