= Orioles family =

Orioles
- Country: Kingdom of Sicily

The Orioles are or were a Sicilian noble family. They came to Sicily from Spain in the time of the Aragonese. At various times they were princes of Castelforte and Roccapalumba, counts of Bastiglia, and barons of Baglia, Xiari and Collabascia, of Cabica, of Campobianco, of Comiso, of Comitini and Pietra di Caltasudeni, of Luchito, of Raccuja and of San Pietro sopra Patti.
