= Giovanni Natoli =

Sicilian aristocrat

- Died: 15 July 1633
- Title: Prince of Sperlinga
- Successor: Francesco Natoli
- Spouses: 1. Melchiorra Orioles Moncada; 2. Maria Cottone Aragona
- Parents: Blasco Natoli Lanza; Domenica Giambruni Perna

Giovanni Forti Natoli or Gianforte Natoli was a Sicilian nobleman, the son of Blasco Natoli Lanza and Domenica Giambruno Perna. He was baron of S. Bartolomeo and Belice. On 20 August 1597 he bought the barony of Sperlinga from Giovanni Ventimiglia, marquis of Gerace, for 30,834 ounces of gold. Natoli was granted a licentia populandi cum privilegium aedificandi ("licence to populate and build") by the king of Sicily, Philip II of Spain. In 1627 he was made prince of Sperlinga by Philip IV of Spain.

Natoli was married twice: first to Maria Cottone Aragona, daughter of Stefano, count of Bauso; and second, to Melchiora Orioles Moncada, daughter of Orazio, baron of San Pietro di Patti. With the latter he had a son, Francesco Natoli.

Giovanni Natoli died on 15 July 1633.
