= Villa Zito =

18th-century palace in Palermo, Italy

Coordinates: 38.13439°N 13.34903°E

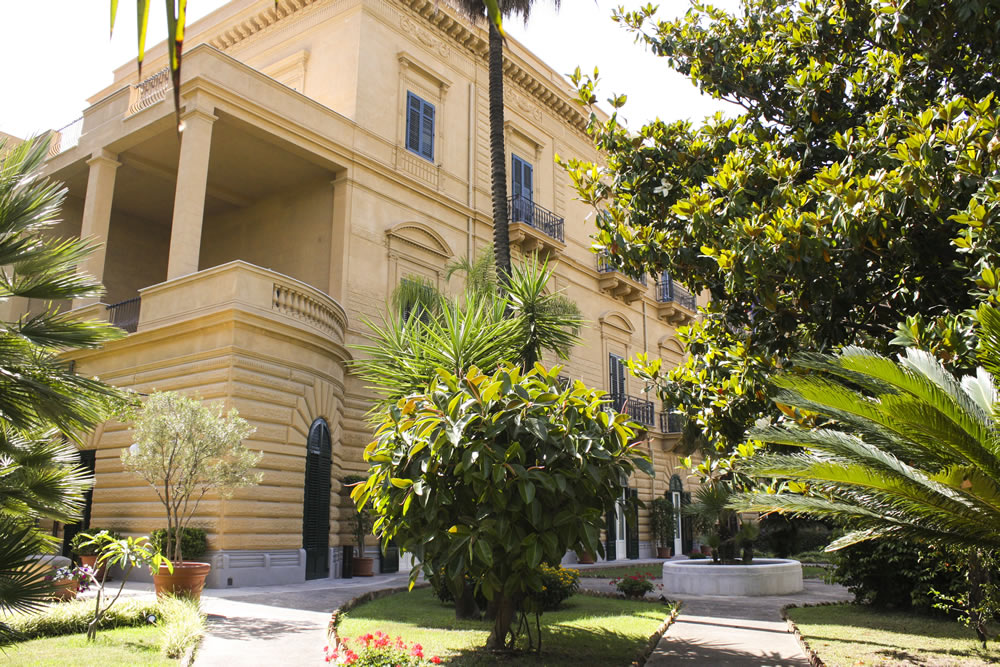
- External view of the palace
- Established: 17th century
- Location: Palermo, Sicily, Italy
- Type: Art
- Owner: Fondazione Sicilia
- Website: www.villazito.it

Villa Zito is an 18th-century palace located on Via della Liberta #52 in Palermo, region of Sicily, Italy. The structure is now owned by the Fondazione Sicilia and serves as their museum gallery and exhibition space for their collection of artworks, mainly graphic works and paintings, by mainly Sicilian artists from the 17th to the early 20th century.

== History ==
The palace was originally at the site of a large semirural house owned by Gaspare Scicli in the first half of the 18th century. The chapel and its decorations date to 1762. In the 19th century, the palace and grounds was sold to Antonio La Grua, prince of Carini. In 1909, it was purchased by the merchant Francesco Zito Scalici. He refurbished and expanded the palace in a Neo-Renaissance style in the early 20th-century using designs by the architect Michele La Cavera. In the 1920s, the palace was acquired by the Banco di Sicilia. The director general of the Bank, Ignazio Mormino, housed here his collection of Sicilian archeology, in what was called Museo Mormino, but these works were moved to the Palazzo Branciforte by 2015.

In 1983, it was made the exhibition hall of its collection promoted by its cultural arm, the Fondazione Banco di Sicilia, which by 2012 had been renamed the Fondazione Sicilia, which since 2005, administers the present collections and has employed the architect Corrado Anselmi in reorganizing display spaces and offices.

On display in this pinacoteca are artists from various centuries, including Bernardo Strozzi, Mattia Preti, Luca Giordano, Salvator Rosa, Francesco Solimena, Ettore De Maria Bergler, Francesco Lojacono, Antonino Leto, Michele Catti, Aleardo Terzi, Camillo Innocenti; Mario Sironi, Filippo De Pisis, Boldini, Giuseppe De Nittis, Federico Zandomeneghi, Signorini, Ottone Rosai, Carlo Carrà, Arturo Tosi, Ugo Attardi, Fausto Pirandello, Renato Guttuso, Armando Pizzinato, Aleardo Terzi, Galileo Chini, Mario Schifano, and Corrado Cagli.

The archeologic, numismatic, philatelic, maiolica, and sculpture collections of the Fondazione, as well as a large library, are housed in the Palazzo Branciforte of Palermo. In addition this palace displays frescoes by Gaspard Dughet.
