= Sant'Angelo di Brolo =

- Comune
- Comune di Sant'Angelo di Brolo
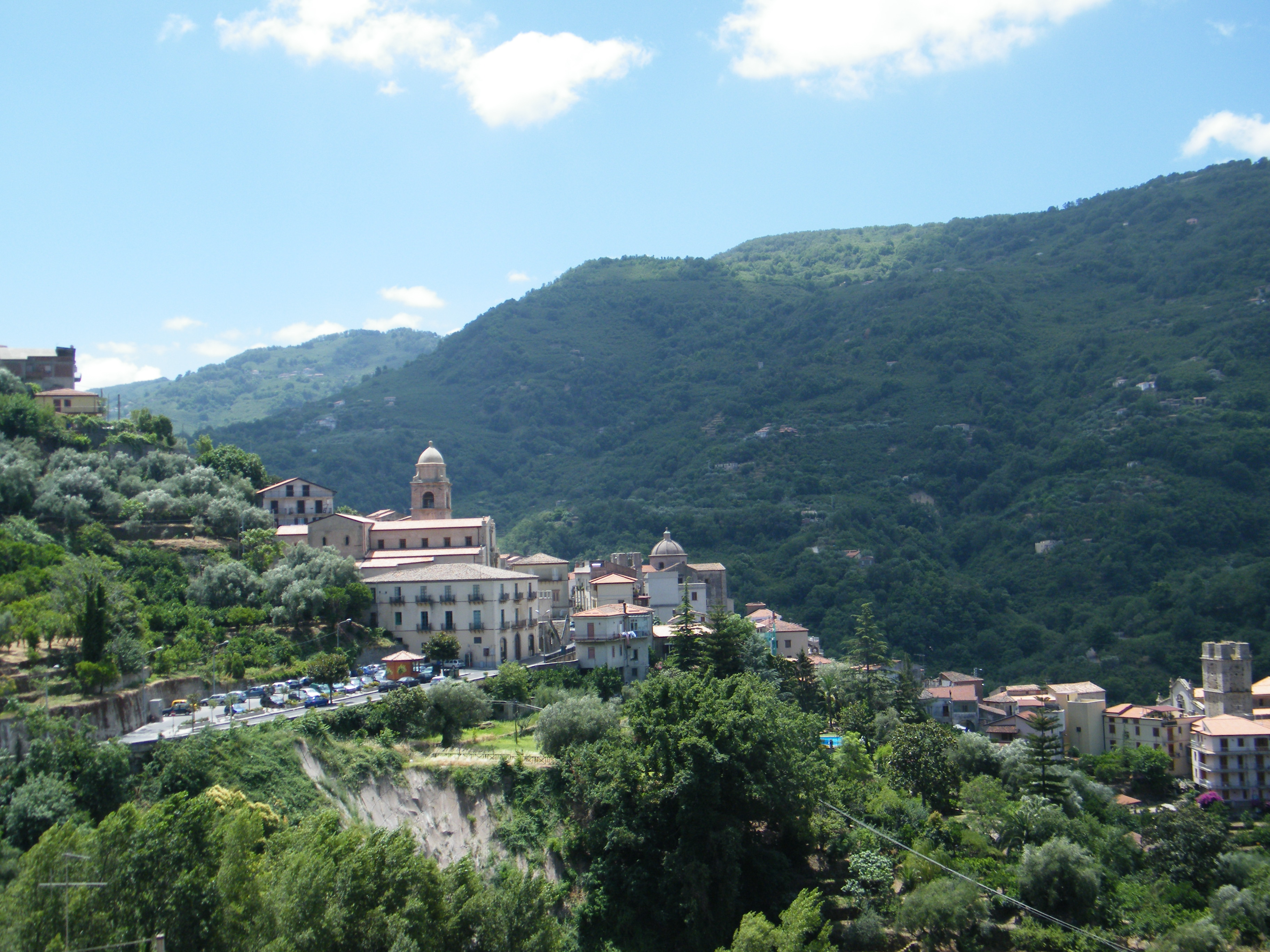

- Location within Italy Location within Sicily
- Coordinates: 38°7′N 14°53′E
- Country: Italy
- Region: Sicily
- Metropolitan city: Messina (ME)

Government
  - Mayor: Francesco Paolo Cortolillo

Area
  - Total: 30.2 km^{2} (11.7 sq mi)
- Elevation: 314 m (1,030 ft)

Population (30 November 2011)
  - Total: 3,300
  - Density: 110/km^{2} (280/sq mi)
- Demonym: Santangiolesi
- Time zone: UTC+1 (CET)
  - Summer (DST): UTC+2 (CEST)
- Postal code: 98060
- Dialing code: 0941
- Website: Official website

Sant'Angelo di Brolo (Sicilian: Sant'Àncilu di Brolu) is a comune (municipality) in the Metropolitan City of Messina in the Italian region Sicily, located about 130 kilometres (81 mi) east of Palermo and about 60 kilometres (37 mi) west of Messina. Sant'Angelo di Brolo borders the following municipalities: Ficarra, Raccuja, San Piero Patti, Piraino, Brolo, Gioiosa Marea, Librizzi, Montagnareale, Sinagra.

== Notable people ==
- Vincenzo Natoli (1690–1770), judge and marquess
- Emanuele Curcio (born 1953), former professional football player
