= Emanuele Curcio =

Italian footballer (born 1953)

Personal information
- Date of birth: 3 May 1953 (age 73)
- Place of birth: Sant'Angelo di Brolo, Italy
- Height: 1.68 m (5 ft 6 in)
- Position: Winger

Senior career*
Years	Team	Apps	(Gls)
1971–1972	Orlandina		
1972–1974	Messina	36	(4)
1974–1975	Roma	15	(2)
1975	Alessandria	0	(0)
1975–1978	Cosenza	79	(9)
1978–1979	Ragusa	26	(1)
1979–1981	Trapani	52	(12)
Total		209	(26)
- * Club domestic league appearances and goals

Emanuele Curcio (born 3 May 1953) is an Italian former professional footballer who played as a winger. He made 15 appearances for Roma in the 1974–75 Serie A season, scoring twice, and played 71 times in Serie C for Messina and Cosenza.

== Life and career ==
Curcio was born in 1953 in Sant'Angelo di Brolo, in the Province of Messina, Sicily. As a youngster, he played local football for Orlandina before joining Messina, where he made his senior debut on the opening day of the 1972–73 Serie C season in the starting eleven for a goalless draw away to Trani. Curcio finished the season with 13 appearances as his team were relegated, but the following season scored four goals from 23 appearances as Messina won their section of Serie D.

His performances earned the 21-year-old Curcio a move to Roma of Serie A. Head coach Nils Liedholm gave him his debut as a second-half substitute on the opening day of the 1974–75 season in a 1–0 defeat away to Torino; his introduction livened up the attack, but made no difference to the score. He made two more appearances in 1974 and, after some muscle problems, made an unexpected return to the first team for the visit to Vicenza on 5 January 1975. Demonstrating pace, trickery and clean shooting, he scored both goals in a 2–0 win that extended Roma's winning run to five and earned him a run in the side. He finished the season with 15 appearances from a possible 30, but no more goals. Because of industrial action, the regular football highlights were not broadcast for the weekend of Curcio's goals against Vicenza. However, film still existed in the archives, and in 2011, Curcio was a guest on Rai 2's Domenica Sportiva when his goals were aired for the first time.

Curcio joined Alessandria at the start of the 1975–76 season, but in three months he played twice in the Coppa Italia Semiprofessionisti and not at all in Serie C. Interviewed some 40 years later, he recalled believing he was not good enough, and that Roma's reasoning for moving him on was that with him in the team, they finished third, but with someone better in his place, they could win the title.

In November, he joined another Serie C side, Cosenza, where he played more regularly. He scored three goals from 58 appearances over 18 months in Serie C, and a further six goals from 21 appearances in Serie D in 1977–78, after which he returned to Sicily and completed his football career with Ragusa in Serie C2 and Trapani in Serie D.

At 28, he retired from football and settled in Capo d'Orlando, Messina, where he took up coaching artistic gymnastics. Initially he taught his daughters, but then opened a gym where other young girls could train, and the ASD Gymnasium Ginnastica Artistica expanded into a training centre "looking more like a theme park than a gym" with 150 girls of all ages.
