= Brolo =

- Comune
- Comune di Brolo
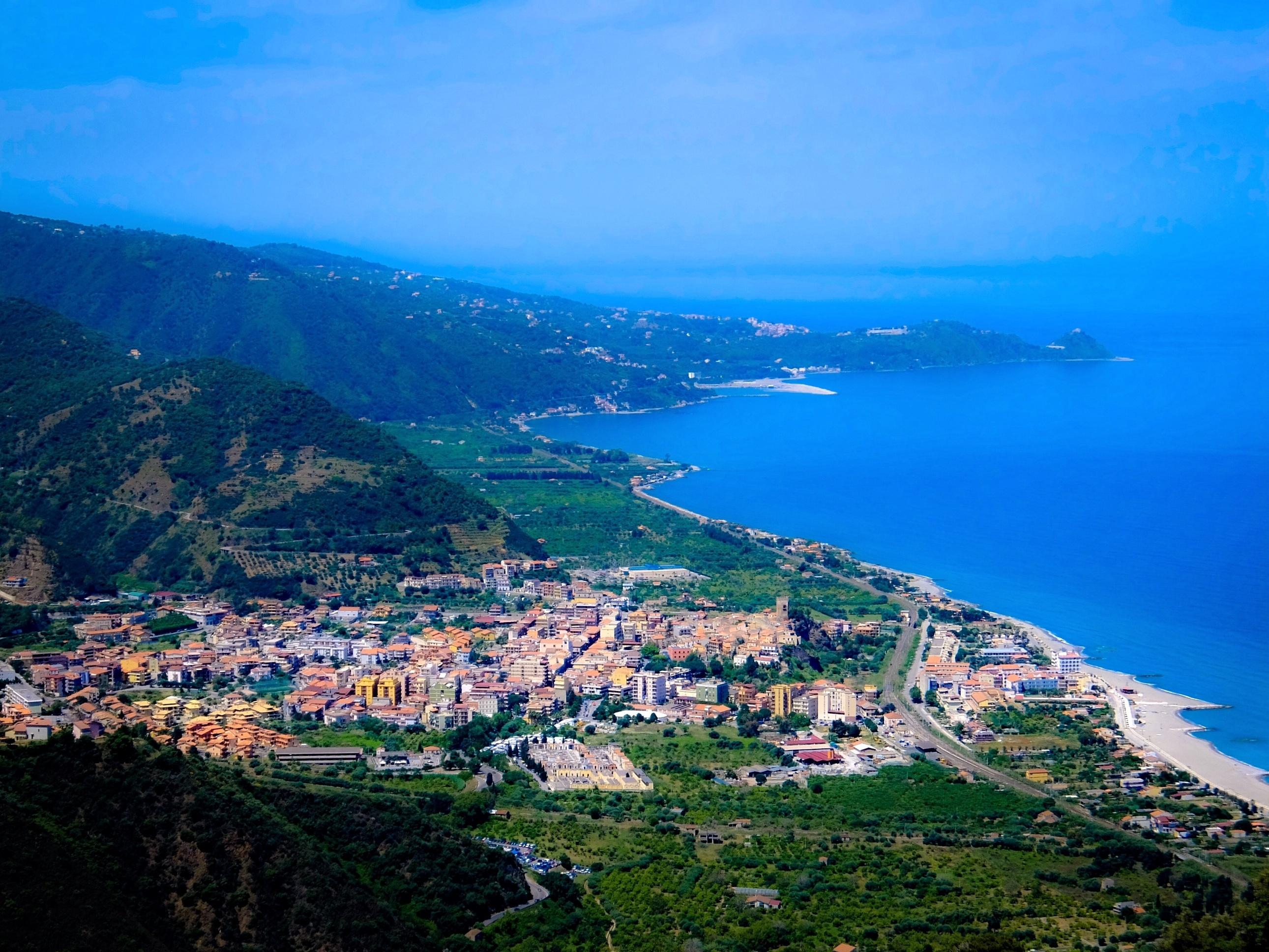

- Coat of arms

- Location within Italy Location within Sicily
- Coordinates: 38°9′N 14°50′E
- Country: Italy
- Region: Sicily
- Metropolitan city: Messina (ME)
- Frazioni: Casette, Filanda, Iannello, Lacco, Lago, Malpertuso, Parrazzà, Piana, Sant'Anna, Sellica

Government
  - Mayor: Rosaria Ricciardello

Area
  - Total: 7.9 km^{2} (3.1 sq mi)
- Elevation: 8 m (26 ft)

Population (31 December 2016)
  - Total: 5,739
  - Density: 730/km^{2} (1,900/sq mi)
- Demonym: Brolesi
- Time zone: UTC+1 (CET)
  - Summer (DST): UTC+2 (CEST)
- Postal code: 98061
- Dialing code: 0941
- Patron saint: Maria SS. Annunziata
- Saint day: March 25
- Website: Official website

Brolo (Sicilian: Brolu) is a comune (municipality) in the Metropolitan City of Messina in the Italian region Sicily, located about 130 kilometres (81 mi) east of Palermo and about 60 kilometres (37 mi) west of Messina.

Brolo borders the following municipalities: Ficarra, Naso, Piraino, Sant'Angelo di Brolo.

Until 1960 the economy was mostly based on agriculture, the main produces including olives and lemons. Now the economy is based on buildings houses, commerce and some summer tourism.

== History ==
During the Roman era Brolo was called Brolium, meaning "garden" or "Park" in Latin, and was crossed by the Via Valeria. In the Middle Ages it had a castle on the sea, around which, probably from the 11th century, a fishermens' settlement arose. Bianca Lancia, mistress and wife of Emperor Frederick II of Hohenstaufen, probably lived in the castle during the 13th century according to some historians.

Brolo was the scene of an amphibious landing during the Battle of Sicily in World War II.
