= Helle Busacca =

Italian poet, painter, and writer

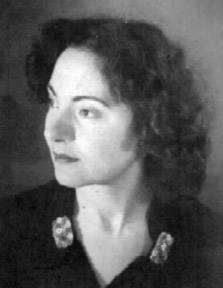

Helle Busacca (Note: Name derived from Greek Ἕλλη.) (Italian pronunciation: [ˈɛlle buˈzakka]; San Piero Patti, 21 December 1915 – Florence, 15 January 1996) was an Italian poet, painter, and writer.

== Life ==
Born in a well-to-do family in San Piero Patti, Province of Messina, Sicily, Helle Busacca lived for part of her youth in her birthplace. Then she moved to Bergamo and later to Milan together with her parents. She graduated with a degree in classical letters at the Royal University of Milan. In the following years, she taught letters in various high schools, moving from city to city: Varese, Pavia, Milan, Naples, Siena, and finally Florence, where she died on 15 January 1996.

Her papers, which include correspondence, sketches, and rough drafts of published works, as well as many unpublished manuscripts, are kept in a special collection at the State Archives of Florence.

In December 2015, at a conference on the centenary of her birth, the Municipal Library of San Piero Patti was named for her.

== Poetry ==
Helle Busacca, from C'è chi nasce un mattino (There's someone who is born one morning)
Italian

E c'è
come te e me, chi è nato
con la nebbia che nessun sole potrà forare

English
transl.

And there is
like you and me, one who is born
with the fog that no sun can pierce

I realize that almost all my writings, whether prose or poetry, are writings of war, where someone who was seeking lyric poetry would be wasting their time. [...] Poetry is the culmination of the infinite layering that from the first bang has created us as we are: this is why, from time immemorial, we can "find ourselves" in it: where we don't find ourselves there is no poetry." (from a curriculum vitae of 1988)

Busacca's papers, which include correspondence, sketches, and rough drafts of published works, as well as many unpublished manuscripts, are kept in a special collection at the State Archives of Florence.

Her poetry and prose have been linked by commentators to events in her personal life, including the suicide of her brother Aldo.. Busacca studied classical literature, and critics have discussed her poetry in relation to modern poetic traditions, including T. S. Eliot and Ezra Pound.. The suicide of her brother Aldo became a central subject in Busacca's later poetry. Her works connected with this event include I quanti del suicidio (1972), I quanti del karma (1974), and Niente poesia da Babele (1980).

In "I quanti suicidio" (1972), the poet invents a language of the spoken word that is simple and immediate, meant for everyone to understand, as an indictment of the Italian system, the cowardice in her country that permitted the suicide of her brother, an unemployed scientist. The language she used, in its fiery directness and immediacy, was completely alienated from the experimental, skeptical, or symbolic language used in the poetry of her contemporaries.

Giorgio Linguaglossa writes:

The poetry of the trilogy has drawn the conclusions of this fact with maximum intensity: Busacca's zombie-word derives its own force from the intimate, unadorned colloquy-soliloquy between a deceased person and a speaking dead person. Cold and mournful, Helle Busacca's new poetry reveals the folly or the melancholy of the society of merchandise and the future computerized production of reality by being inalienably estranged from it. So if in the world of merchandise the hyperreality follows another hyperreality... in Busacca's poetry estrangement lays the foundation of her "spoken word": a sort of zombie from the cadaver of a dead person: the slaying of her brother "aldo;" (Note: She always writes his name in lower case.) that which makes this poetry ever more head-on, surreal and metareal, hypochondriac, obsessive, exclusive, maniacal...

== Criticism and reviews ==
Carlo Betocchi, Eugenio Montale, (Note: Helle Busacca mentions him in "Il mio strano amico Montale" (1986), State Archives of Florence, vol. 39.) Raffaele Crovi, Giuseppe Zagarrio, Mario Grasso, Domenico Cara, Donato Valli, Gilda Musa, Bortolo Pento, Carlo Bo, Luciano Anceschi, Claudio Marabini, Oreste Macrì, Marco Marchi, Maurizio Cucchi, Gabriella Maleti, Mario Luzi, Alberico Sala, Sergio Solmi, Luigi Testaferrata, Vittorio Sereni, Marcello Venturi, Leonardo Sinisgalli, and Giorgio Linguaglossa, among others, have written about her.

== Works ==
=== Books ===
- Giuoco nella memoria (Modena: Guanda, 1949).
- Ritmi (Varese: Magenta, 1965).
- I quanti del suicidio (Rome: S.E.T.I., 1972; reprinted: Bologna, Seledizioni, 1973).
- I quanti del karma (Bologna: Seledizioni, 1974).
- Niente poesia da Babele (Bologna: Seledizioni, 1980).
- Il libro del risucchio (Castelmaggiore: Book, 1990).
- Il libro delle ombre cinesi (Fondi: Confrontographic, 1990).
- Pene di amor perdute (Ragusa: Cultura Duemila, 1994).
- Ottovolante, edited by Idolina Landolfi (Florence: Cesati, 1997).
- Poesie scelte, edited by Daniela Monreale (Salerno: Ripostes, 2002).
- Vento d'estate (Maser: Amadeus, 1987) (prose).
- Racconti di un mondo perduto (Genoa: Silverpress, 1992) (prose).

=== In journals ===
- "I bestioni e gli eroi" and "L'America scoperta e riscoperta", in: Civiltà delle macchine, 1956.
- "Il mio strano amico Montale", in: L'Albero, 1986, vol. 39

=== Unpublished works ===
- Contrappunto (autobiographical novel).
- Controcorrente (autobiographical novel).
- "Una storia senza storia" (short story)
- De Rerum Natura (translation from Lucretius).

== Personal archive ==
The Alessandra Contini Bonacossi Archive for Women's Memory and Writing has curated the collecting, organizing, and storing of her papers at the State Archives of Florence.

== Bibliography ==
- Scritture femminili in Toscana: Voci per un autodizionario, edited by Ernestina Pellegrini (Florence: Editrice le Lettere, 2006).
- Mariella Bettarini, "Donne e poesia, prima parte (dal 1963 al 1979)" in: Poesia no. 119, July/August 1998.
- Daniela Monreale, "Vita e scrittura in una parola ribelle: La poesia di Helle Busacca" in: Le voci della Luna no. 20, March 2002.
- Ernestina Pellegrini, Introduction to Helle Busacca, Poesie scelte, edited by Daniela Monreale (Salerno: Edizioni Ripostes 2002).
- Gabriella Musetti, review of Helle Busacca, Poesie scelte in: Leggere Donna no. 104, May–June 2003.
- Alessandra Caon, "L'harakiri violento della parola-ferita" in: Le voci della Luna no. 28, March 2004.
- Alessandra Caon, Rabbia e dissolvenze: la poesia di Helle Busacca (graduate thesis), Università degli Studi di Padova, 2004.
- Alessandra Caon and Silvio Ramat, "Helle Busacca, Il pathos della parola" in: Poesia no. 180, February 2004.
- Serena Mafrida, Helle Busacca: La scala ripida verso le stelle (Florence: Società Editrice Fiorentina, 2010).
- Giorgio Linguaglossa, Dalla lirica al discorso poetico: Storia della poesia italiana 1945–2010 (Rome: EdiLet, 2011).
