= San Piero Patti =

- Comune
- Comune di San Piero Patti
- Location within Italy Location within Sicily
- Country: Italy
- Region: Sicily
- Metropolitan city: Messina (ME)

Government
  - Mayor: Salvatore Vittorio Fiore

Area
  - Total: 41.6 km^{2} (16.1 sq mi)
- Elevation: 440 m (1,440 ft)

Population (1 January 2015)
  - Total: 2,975
  - Density: 71.5/km^{2} (185/sq mi)
- Demonym: Sampietrini
- Time zone: UTC+1 (CET)
  - Summer (DST): UTC+2 (CEST)
- Postal code: 98068
- Dialing code: 0941
- Website: Official website

San Piero Patti (Sicilian: San Pieru Patti) is a comune (municipality) in the Metropolitan City of Messina in the Italian region Sicily, located about 140 kilometres (87 mi) east of Palermo and about 50 kilometres (31 mi) southwest of Messina.

San Piero Patti borders the following municipalities: Patti, Raccuja, Sant'Angelo di Brolo, Librizzi, Montalbano Elicona.

== History ==
San Piero Patti was conquered and inhabited by the Arabs until the 11th century, when they were defeated by Roger I of Sicily.

== Main sights ==
- Church of Santa Maria - church built in 1566; contains 16th-century frescos
- Convent of Carmelitani Calzati, a convent built in 1566; features a cloister with Renaissance decorations
- Museo dei Vangeli e del Verbo Umanato, a religious museum containing a collection of vestments, sacred painting and artifacts
- Mother Church, built in the second half of the 14th century

== People ==
- Helle Busacca, poet
- Emilio Fede, journalist
- Pete Rugolo, jazz musician
