= Giacomo Natoli =

Italian politician

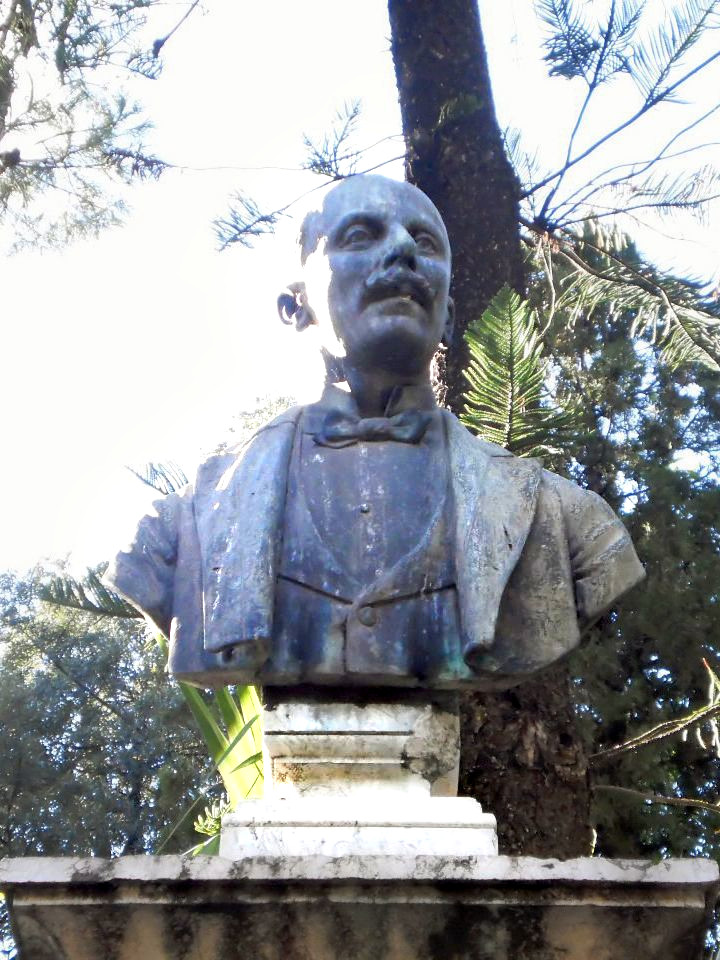
- Portrait bust of Natoli, Messina, Sicily
- Born: 27 August 1846
- Died: Messina, Sicily
- Parent(s): Giuseppe Natoli, Maria Cardile
- Honors: knight, Order of the Crown of Italy

Giacomo Natoli (born 27 August 1846) was an Italian cavalry officer. He was three times sindaco or mayor of Messina, in the Mediterranean island of Sicily. On 11 March 1889 he obtained ministerial recognition of the title of nobility 'Barone di Scaliti'.
