= ACR Messina =

Association football club in Messina, Sicily, Italy

Messina
- Full name: Associazioni Calcio Riunite Messina S.r.l.
- Nicknames: Giallorossi (Yellow-red); Biancoscudati (White-shield)
- Founded: 1900 as Messina F.C. 2017 as A.C.R. Messina
- Ground: Stadio Comunale San Filippo-Franco Scoglio, Messina, Italy
- Capacity: 38,722
- Owner: Racing City Group
- Chairman: Justin Davis
- Head coach: Giuseppe Romano
- League: Serie D
- 2024–25: Serie C Group C, 18th of 20 (relegated)
- Website: acrmessina1900.com
Home colours	Away colours

Associazioni Calcio Riunite Messina S.r.l. is a association football club based in Messina, Sicily, Italy, that competes in the Serie D, the fourth tier of the Italian football league system.

== History ==
=== Football in Messina ===
The origins of the team go back to 1900, when Messina Football Club was founded in the city. The club has spent most of its existence in the lower Italian football leagues. They last competed in Serie B in 2007–08, which followed three consecutive seasons in Serie A. In July 2008, Messina were excluded from professional football due to financial issues, being later registered into amateur Serie D.

The farthest Messina has reached in the Coppa Italia is the last 16. This was achieved in the 2000s decade. In the past, they have also reached the semi-finals in the Coppa Italia Serie C.

Messina have appeared in the Italy's top league, Serie A, for a total of five seasons. The club's first spell in the league was in the 1960s; the second began in the 2000s decade. The highest ever position they have finished is 7th,

==== From Messina F.C. to Giostra Messina (1900 to 1939) ====
Messina Football Club were officially founded on 1 December 1900 by Marangolo with the help of Anglican reverend "Caulifield".

At the college where Marangolo visited he had also made the acquaintance of Ignazio Majo Pagano who formed Anglo Palermitan (Palermo) on his return, only a month before Messina. The first Sicilian derby was held between Messina and Palermo on 18 April 1901; 1,000 fans turned out to Via Notarbartolo for the match. The game ended 3–2 to the Palermitan side.

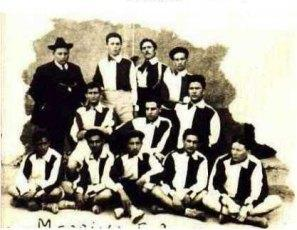
Messina team photograph from 1910.

The earthquake of 1908, which killed 60,000 people in Messina, later affected the club in a large manner; deaths included Charles Bousfield Huleatt, players Frank John Carter, Walter Oates and financial backer George H. Peirce. Football resumed in Messina the following year, thanks largely to Arthur Barret Lascelles who used his own money to ensure football activity in the city would continue. By 1910, the funds of Barret had dried up, and the club was folded, Società Ginnastica Garibaldi Messina (Gymnastic Society Garibaldi Messina) briefly took its place, until it too was dissolved due to the First World War.

The club participated in the Italian Football Championship of 1921–22, organised by the C.C.I., finishing third in the Sicilian group section; this was the first championship in which clubs from the island were entered. The following season the FIGC and CCI were unified. This coincided with mergers in Messina, as another side, Umberto I Messina, was incorporated into US Messinese, and, therefore, the club changed its name to US Messinese Umberto I in October 1922. The following month this new side was fused again, this time with Messina Sporting Club; creating the Messina Football Club. Only two years later, in December 1924, FC Messina was melted, and the players became part of the reformed US Messinese.

Messina's last squad of the 1930s, while Lombardo was president

==== From U.S. Peloro to F.C. Messina Peloro ====
After being tipped as underdogs in Serie A for the 2004–05 season, Messina surprised doubters by producing several good results including defeating both of the Milanese clubs, beating AC Milan first at San Siro 2–1, and then later in the season also with Internazionale, this time at home, for the first time in their history; the winning goal was struck by Rafael in the third minute of injury time.

==== A.C. Rinascita Messina ====
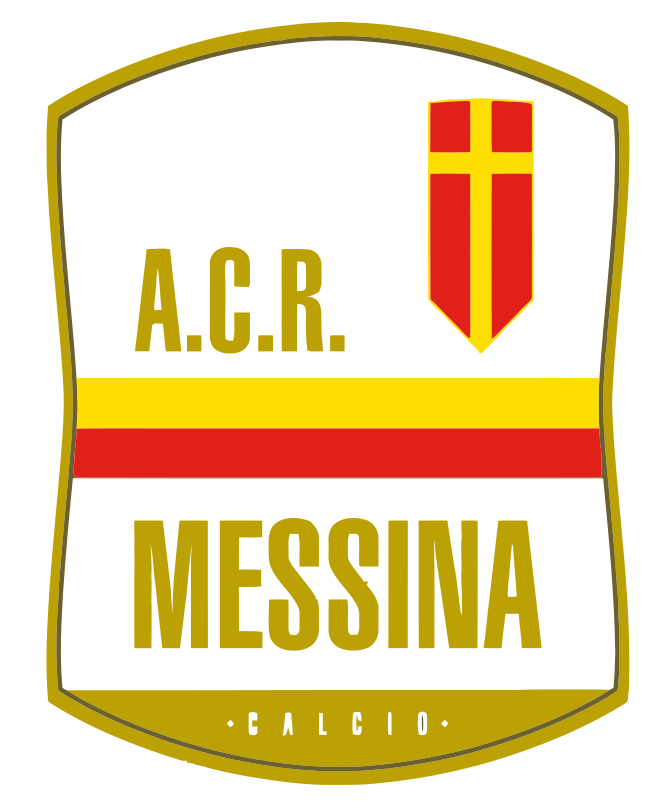
Logo of Rinascita Messina

In March 2009, Rome-based entrepreneur Alfredo Di Lullo acquired Football Club Messina Peloro in a blind auction held by the Court of Messina in April 2009. The club was renamed A.C. Rinascita Messina (rinascita means "revived").

==== A.C. Riunite Messina ====
Since the summer of 2014, the new name of the club is Associazioni Calcio Riunite Messina. In the 2014–15 season, the club was relegated to Serie D, but it was readmitted to Lega Pro for involvement in sporting fraud. Since the summer of 2015, the new owner and president is Natale Stracuzzi. The club failed to submit its surety by the 5 July 2017 deadline and was expelled by Lega Pro. A successor club, A.C.R. Messina S.s.d. a r.l. was admitted to the 2017–18 Serie D.

== Ultras ==
In 1973, the first ultras firm of ACR Messina was founded: the "Fedelissimi". In 1980, "Gioventù Giallorossa" was born, revolutionizing the supporter scene in Sicily and opening sections in Rome, Milan, and Turin. In 1982, "Uragano CEP" was established. In 1983, some small firms merged into a single group called "NOCS". In 1990, the "Fracidi" were formed. In 1997, the "Lions" came into being. In 2010, "Semu Pacci" was founded. In 2024, "Area Ostile" was established. During the club's time in Serie A and Serie B, it had thousands of non-organized fans, a number that has significantly declined over the last twenty years. Messina's fanbase has reached peaks of 38,000 spectators at home and 10,000 away.

== Current squad ==
As of 1 July 2025

Note: Flags indicate national team as defined under FIFA eligibility rules; some limited exceptions apply. Players may hold more than one non-FIFA nationality.

No.	Pos.	Nation	Player
1	GK	ITA	Flavio Curtosi
4	MF	ITA	Vincenzo Garofalo
5	DF	SEN	Ndir Mame Ass
7	DF	ITA	Damiano Lia
9	FW	ITA	Carmine De Sena
12	GK	LTU	Titas Krapikas
14	DF	GHA	Bright Gyamfi

No.	Pos.	Nation	Player
15	DF	ITA	Antonio Marino
16	MF	ITA	Davide Petrucci
18	FW	ITA	Pierluca Luciani
22	GK	ITA	Gabriel Meli
27	MF	ITA	Bryan Mameli
31	MF	ITA	Domenico Anzelmo
37	MF	LIE	Marcel Büchel

=== Out on loan ===
Note: Flags indicate national team as defined under FIFA eligibility rules; some limited exceptions apply. Players may hold more than one non-FIFA nationality.

No. / Pos. / Nation / Player; — / MF / ITA / Manuel Di Palma (at Nuova Igea Virtus until 30 June 2025)	No. / Pos. / Nation / Player; — / FW / ITA / Gabriel Adragna (at Nuova Igea Virtus until 30 June 2025)

== Notable players ==
- (Italy) Salvatore Aronica
- (Italy) Emanuele Curcio
- (Honduras) Julio César de León
- (Italy) Arturo Di Napoli
- (Greece) Dimitrios Eleftheropoulos
- (Italy) Antonio Nocerino
- (Italy) Alessandro Parisi
- (Italy) Igor Protti
- (Iran) Rahman Rezaei
- (Italy) Christian Riganò
- (Italy) Salvatore Schillaci
- (Italy) Marco Storari
- (Italy) Salvatore Sullo
- (Japan) Atsushi Yanagisawa
- (Italy) Riccardo Zampagna
- (Ivory Coast) Marco Zoro
- (Serbia) Ivica Iliev

== Stadium ==
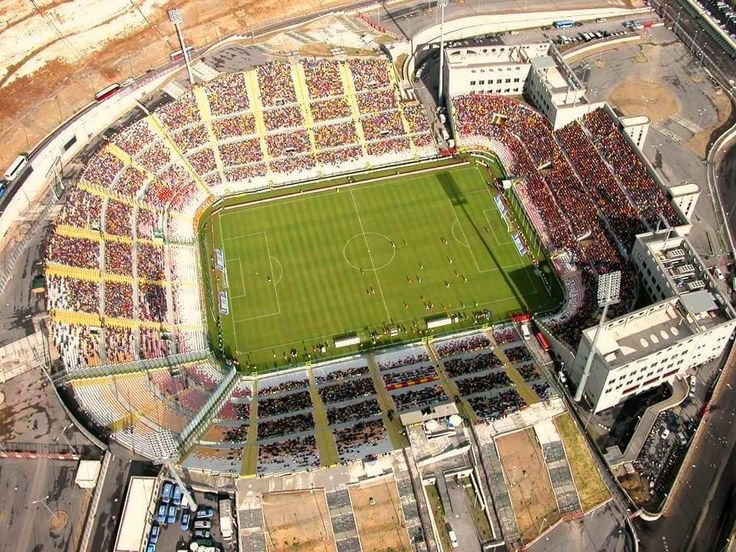
Stadio San Filippo.

The former club Football Club Messina Peloro have played their home matches in the new Stadio Comunale San Filippo since the 2004–05 to 2008–09 season. Since the season 2009–10 plays here the current team of A.C. Riunite Messina 1947.

The capacity of the stadium is 37,895 seats. It is named after the part of the city in which it is located, but a couple of petitions aim to rename it after the former Messina manager Franco Scoglio or the Messina Saint Hannibal Mary Di Francia.

The old stadium, the 11,000 seater Stadio Comunale Giovanni Celeste, is now used by S.S.D. Città di Messina, the second team of the city.

== Recent shirt sponsorship ==
For the 2022–23 season, Coop – Gruppo Radenza served as ACR Messina's main shirt sponsor. In October 2023, StarCasinò Sport became the club's main shirt sponsor under a two-season agreement covering the 2023–24 and 2024–25 seasons.

== Honours ==
- Serie B
  - 1 Champions: 1962–63
- Serie C
  - 3 Champion : 1949–50, 1985–86, 1931-32
- Serie C2
  - 3 Champions: 1982–83, 1999–00, 2013–14
- Serie D
  - 4 Champions: 1973–74 (Group I), 1997-98 (Group I), 2012–13 (Group I), 2020-21 (Group I)
- Sicilian Championship
  - 2 Winners: 1922-23, 1924–25
- Whitaker Challenge Cup
  - 2 Winners: 1905, 1906
