= Sperlinga =

Sperlinga Spilliṅga (Sicilian)
- Comune
- Comune di Sperlinga
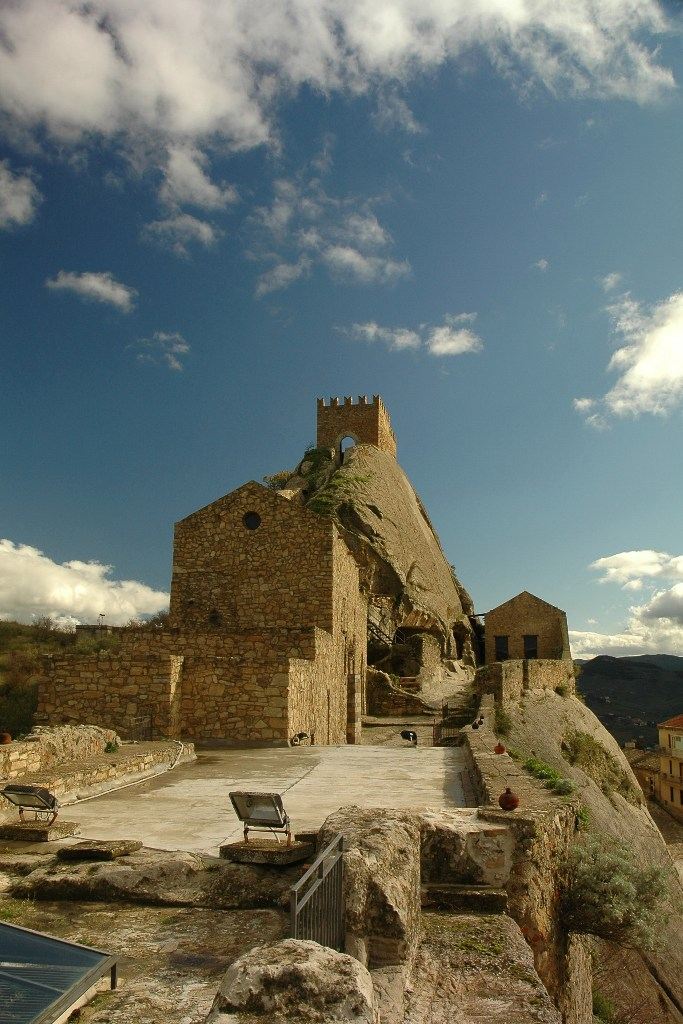
- Sperlinga castle

- Location within Italy Location within Sicily
- Coordinates: 37°46′N 14°21′E
- Country: Italy
- Region: Sicily
- Province: Enna (EN)

Government
  - Mayor: Giuseppe Cuccì

Area
  - Total: 59.14 km^{2} (22.83 sq mi)
- Elevation: 750 m (2,460 ft)

Population (2026)
  - Total: 639
  - Density: 10.8/km^{2} (28.0/sq mi)
- Demonym: Sperlinghesi
- Time zone: UTC+1 (CET)
  - Summer (DST): UTC+2 (CEST)
- Postal code: 94010
- Dialing code: 0935
- Website: comune.sperlinga.en.it

Sperlinga (Sicilian: Spilliṅga) is a village and comune (municipality) in the Province of Enna in the autonomous island region of Sicily in southern Italy, located about 20 kilometres (12 mi) northeast of Enna and 90 kilometres (56 mi) southeast of Palermo. It has 639 inhabitants.

Sperlinga borders the municipalities of Gangi and Nicosia.

It is one of I Borghi più belli d'Italia ("The most beautiful villages of Italy").

== History ==
The village is first mentioned (as "Sperlingua") in a privilege of the Norman Count Roger from 1082. The first information on the castle is from 1113, and the earliest direct reference to it from 1239.

Sperlinga reputedly did not participate in the Sicilian Vespers, the bloody uprising against the Angevin French rulers of Sicily in 1282, and may have offered them protection. An inscription over a door of the castle formerly read quod Siculis placuit sola Sperlinga negavit, or roughly "what pleased the Sicilians, only Sperlinga denied".

From about 1360 Sperlinga was held by the Ventimiglia family. In 1597 it was sold for 30,834 ounces of gold to Giovanni Natoli, who was granted a licentia populandi or "licence to populate" by the king of Sicily, Philip II of Spain, and was made Prince of Sperlinga in 1627. His son Francesco sold Sperlinga in 1656 to Giovanni Stefano Oneto, but retained the princely title. Oneto was made Duke of Sperlinga in 1666 by Charles II of Spain.

During the Allied invasion of Sicily, in the Second World War, Allied forces under General Allen, including American infantry and tank units and Moroccan Goumiers, moved past Sperlinga to envelop Nicosia, a few kilometres to the south. They met strong resistance. After a show of force by American tanks, the Axis forces withdrew from Sperlinga and Nicosia during the night of 27 July 1943. Units of the American 16th Infantry Regiment entered Sperlinga the next morning.

== Geography ==
Sperlinga is at about 750 m above sea level, on a hill on the southern slopes of the Nebrodi mountains. It has a number of troglodyte dwellings. The village is dominated by a large mediaeval castle, dating from late Norman times.

== Demographics ==
As of 2026, the population is 639, of which 49.5% are males, and 50.5% are females. Minors make up 8.9% of the population, and seniors make up 32.7%.

At the end of 2014, the population was 819 people in 344 families.

Historical population

Year	Pop.	±%
1861	1,760	—
1871	1,750	−0.6%
1881	2,036	+16.3%
1901	2,203	+8.2%
1911	3,359	+52.5%
1921	1,715	−48.9%
1931	1,714	−0.1%
1936	1,539	−10.2%

Year	Pop.	±%
1951	1,552	+0.8%
1961	1,432	−7.7%
1971	1,216	−15.1%
1981	1,053	−13.4%
1991	1,065	+1.1%
2001	963	−9.6%
2011	833	−13.5%
2021	697	−16.3%

Source: ISTAT

=== Immigration ===
As of 2025, immigrants make up 3.8% of the population. The 5 largest foreign countries of birth are Argentina, Albania, Romania, Germany, and Switzerland.

== Economy ==
The principal economic activities of Sperlinga are agriculture and animal husbandry.
