= Guido Natoli =

Italian politician

- Born: 2 February 1893; Gioiosa Marea, Sicily
- Died: 23 October 1966 (aged 73); Messina, Sicily
- Occupations: farmer, politician

Guido Natoli (2 February 1893 – 23 October 1966) was an Italian farmer and member of the Camera dei deputati of the parliament of Fascist Italy. He was born at Gioiosa Marea in the province of Messina, in Sicily. He was head of the Federazione Sindacale Fascista degli Agricoltori, the "farmer's Fascist trade union federation", in Messina. He was a member of the Camera dei deputati in the 28th, 29th and 30th legislatures of the parliament of the Kingdom of Italy, from 20 April 1929 to 2 August 1943.
