= Piraino =

- Comune
- Comune di Piraino
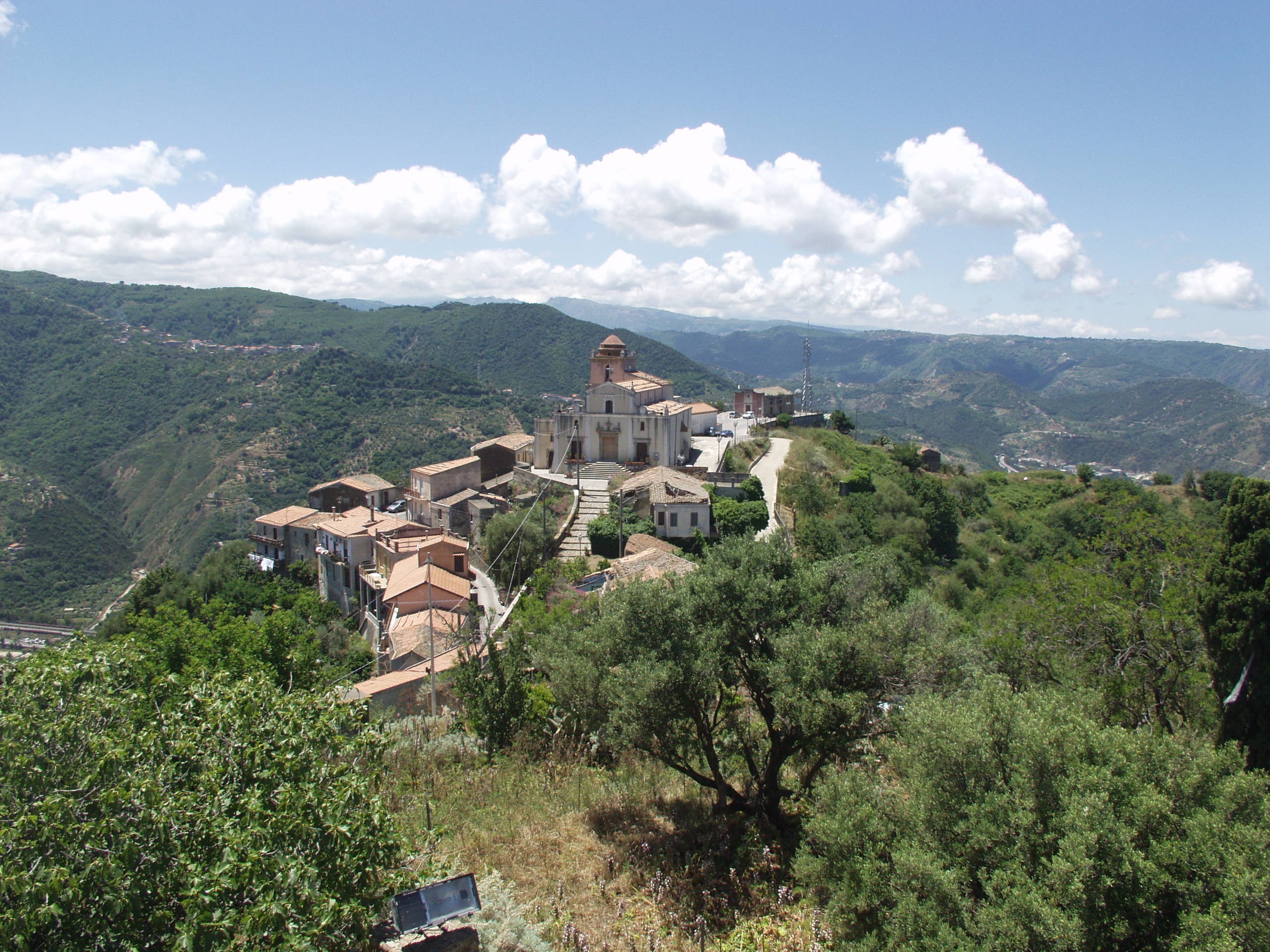

- Location within Italy Location within Sicily
- Coordinates: 38°9′N 14°51′E
- Country: Italy
- Region: Sicily
- Metropolitan city: Messina (ME)
- Frazioni: Calanovella, Fiumara, Gliaca, Lacco, Leomandri, Merca, S.Arcangelo, S.Biagio, S.Costantino, S.Ignazio, S.Leonardo, Salinà, Zappardino

Government
  - Mayor: Maurizio Ruggeri

Area
  - Total: 17.2 km^{2} (6.6 sq mi)
- Elevation: 416 m (1,365 ft)

Population (31 December 2016)
  - Total: 3,975
  - Density: 231/km^{2} (599/sq mi)
- Demonym: Pirainesi
- Time zone: UTC+1 (CET)
  - Summer (DST): UTC+2 (CEST)
- Postal code: 98060
- Dialing code: 0941
- Website: Official website

Piraino (Sicilian: Piràinu) is a comune (municipality) in the Metropolitan City of Messina in the Italian region Sicily, located about 130 kilometres (81 mi) east of Palermo and about 60 kilometres (37 mi) west of Messina.

The municipality of Piraino contains the frazioni (subdivisions, mainly villages and hamlets) Calanovella, Fiumara, Gliaca, Lacco, Leomandri, Merca, S.Arcangelo, S.Biagio, S.Costantino, S.Ignazio, S.Leonardo, Salinà, and Zappardino.

Piraino borders the following municipalities: Sant'Angelo di Brolo, Brolo, Gioiosa Marea.
