= Vincenzo Natoli =

Sicilian judge (1690–1770)

- Born: 1690; Sant'Angelo di Brolo, Kingdom of Sicily
- Died: 21 October 1770 (aged 79–80); Palermo, Kingdom of Sicily
- Occupation: Judge

Vincenzo Natoli (1690 – 21 October 1770) was a Sicilian judge. He was made a marquess in 1756 by Charles III of Spain, the King of the Two Sicilies.

== Biography ==
Natoli was born in 1690, in Sant'Angelo di Brolo. From 1730 to 1734, and again in 1740, he was a judge of the Gran Corte Criminale ("grand criminal court") of Palermo. From 10 April 1748, he was a minister in Messina. On 10 July 1751, he became a Regio Consultore, an advisor to the king in Naples. From 1758, he was president of the tribunal of the Real Patrimonio, or "royal heritage", in Palermo. He became president of the Civil and Criminal High Court in April 1761.

Natoli married Angela Piola and then, in 1748, he married the widowed daughter of Baron Mangiadaini, Maria Sieripopoli. His son, Artale Natoli, pre-deceased him, dying on 11 December 1768. Natoli died on 21 October 1770, aged 79 or 80, in Palermo, and was buried in the Catacombe dei Cappuccini in that city.
