= Gioiosa Marea =

Gioiosa Marea Agathirnòn (Greek)
- Comune
- Comune di Gioiosa Marea
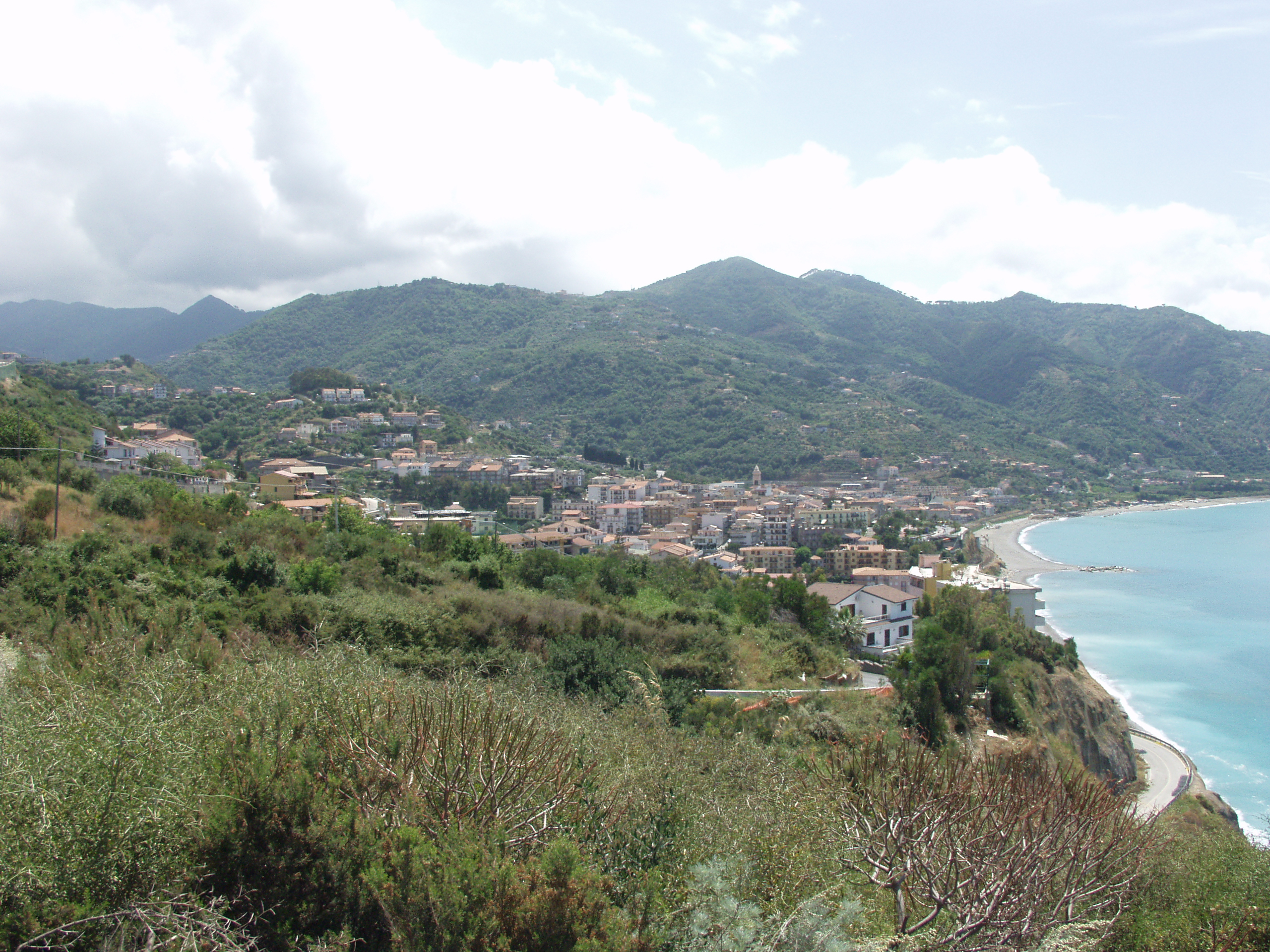

- Coat of arms

- Location within Italy Location within Sicily
- Coordinates: 38°10′N 14°54′E
- Country: Italy
- Region: Sicily
- Metropolitan city: Messina (ME)

Government
  - Mayor: Ignazio Alfonso Spanò

Area
  - Total: 26.3 km^{2} (10.2 sq mi)
- Elevation: 30 m (98 ft)

Population (31 December 2015)
  - Total: 7,074
  - Density: 269/km^{2} (697/sq mi)
- Demonym: Gioiosani
- Time zone: UTC+1 (CET)
  - Summer (DST): UTC+2 (CEST)
- Postal code: 98063
- Dialing code: 0941
- Website: Official website

Gioiosa Marea (Sicilian: Giujusa) is a comune (municipality) in the Metropolitan City of Messina in the Italian region Sicily, located about 130 kilometres (81 mi) east of Palermo and about 60 kilometres (37 mi) west of Messina.

Gioiosa Marea borders the following municipalities: Montagnareale, Patti, Piraino, Sant'Angelo di Brolo. The towns name translates to "Joyful Tide".

== People ==
- Guido Natoli (1893–1966)
