= USS Oriole =

USS Oriole may refer to:

- USS Oriole (1864), was a river sternwheel steamer acquired in 1864 and sold in 1865
- USS Oriole (1895), was the former sloop-of-war USS Dale launched in 1839, renamed Oriole in 1906 and sold in 1921
- USS Oriole (AM-7), was an Lapwing-class minesweeper launched in 1918 and sold in 1947
- USS Oriole (AMCU-33), was launched as USS LCI(L)–973 in 1944, renamed Oriole in 1952 and sold in 1961
- USS Oriole (MHC-55), was an Osprey-class minehunter launched in 1993 and sold in 2010
