= Raccuja =

- Comune
- Comune di Raccuja
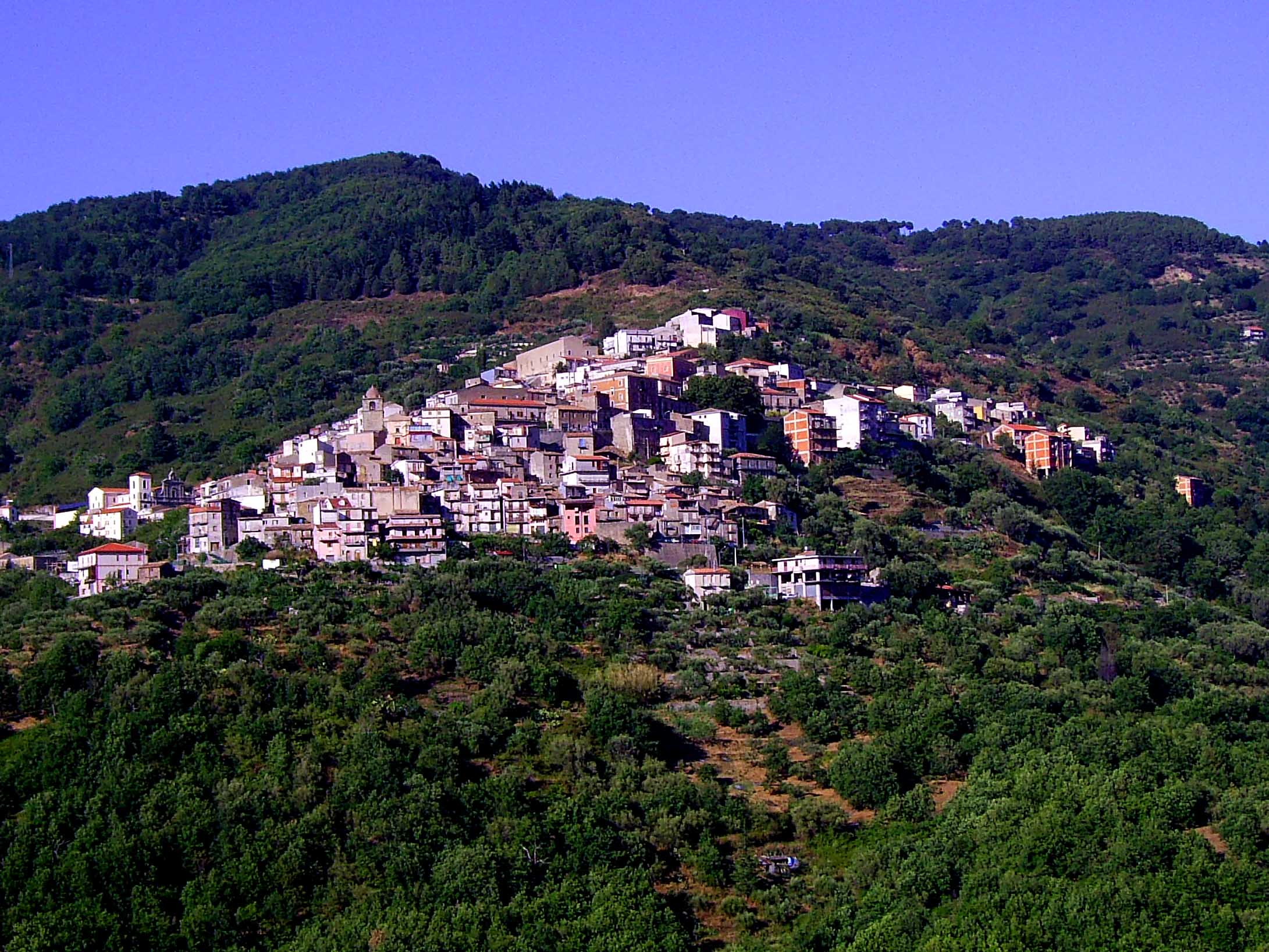

- Location within Italy Location within Sicily
- Coordinates: 38°3′N 14°55′E
- Country: Italy
- Region: Sicily
- Metropolitan city: Messina (ME)
- Frazioni: Zappa, S. Nicolò, Fossochiodo

Government
  - Mayor: Francesca Salpietro Damiano

Area
  - Total: 25.1 km^{2} (9.7 sq mi)
- Elevation: 640 m (2,100 ft)

Population (30 November 2011)
  - Total: 1,118
  - Density: 44.5/km^{2} (115/sq mi)
- Demonym: Raccuiesi
- Time zone: UTC+1 (CET)
  - Summer (DST): UTC+2 (CEST)
- Postal code: 98067
- Dialing code: 0941
- Website: Official website

Raccuja is a comune (municipality) in the Metropolitan City of Messina in the Italian region Sicily, located about 140 kilometres (87 mi) east of Palermo and about 60 kilometres (37 mi) west of Messina.

Raccuja borders the following municipalities: San Piero Patti, Sant'Angelo di Brolo, Floresta, Montalbano Elicona, Sinagra, Ucria.
