= Librizzi =

- Comune
- Comune di Librizzi
- Coat of arms

- Location within Italy Location within Sicily
- Coordinates: 38°6′N 14°57′E
- Country: Italy
- Region: Sicily
- Metropolitan city: Messina (ME)
- Frazioni: Colla Maffone, Murmari, Nasidi

Government
  - Mayor: Renato Di Blasi

Area
  - Total: 23.4 km^{2} (9.0 sq mi)
- Elevation: 501 m (1,644 ft)

Population (30 November 2011)
  - Total: 1,783
  - Density: 76.2/km^{2} (197/sq mi)
- Demonym: Librizzesi
- Time zone: UTC+1 (CET)
  - Summer (DST): UTC+2 (CEST)
- Postal code: 98064
- Dialing code: 0941
- Patron saint: Madonna della Catena
- Saint day: September 8
- Website: Official website

Librizzi (Sicilian: Libbrizzi) is a comune (municipality) in the Metropolitan City of Messina in the Italian region Sicily, located about 140 kilometres (87 mi) east of Palermo and about 50 kilometres (31 mi) west of Messina, on a hill between the Timeto and Librizzi streams.

Its origins date most likely to the 12th century, when a community rose around the Brichinnai castle.
