= Canneto =

Canneto is an Italian word referred to a reed bed. It may refer to several places in Italy:

== Municipalities (comuni) ==
- Canneto Pavese, in the Province of Pavia, Lombardy
- Canneto sull'Oglio, in the Province of Mantua, Lombardy

== Civil parishes (frazioni) ==
- Canneto (Caronia), in the municipality of Caronia (ME), Sicily, famous for the Canneto fires
- Canneto (Lipari), in the municipality of Lipari (ME), Sicily
- Canneto (Monteverdi Marittimo), in the municipality of Monteverdi Marittimo (PI), Tuscany
- Canneto (Perugia), in the municipality of Perugia, Umbria
- Canneto (Postiglione), in the municipality of Postiglione (SA), Campania
- Canneto Sabino, in the municipality of Fara in Sabina (RI), Lazio
- Ronco Campo Canneto, in the municipality of Trecasali (PR), Emilia-Romagna
- Canneto di Bari, former municipality, now one of the quarters constituting Adelfia (BA), Apulia
