= Agathyrnum =

Agathyrnum or Agathyrna (Ancient Greek: Ἀγάθυρνα and Ἀγάθυρνον), was an ancient city of Magna Graecia on the north coast of Sicily between Tyndaris and Calacte. It was supposed to have derived its name from Agathyrnus (Ancient Greek: Ἀγάθυρνος), a son of Aeolus, who is said to have founded the city. But though it may be inferred from this story that it was an ancient city, and probably of Spartan origin (as a colony of the very near town of Demenna), we find no mention of it in history until after Sicily became a Roman province. During the Second Punic War it became the headquarters of a band of robbers and freebooters, who extended their ravages over the neighboring country, but were reduced by the consul Laevinus in 210 BCE, who transported 4000 of them to Rhegium. It very probably was deprived on this occasion of the municipal rights conceded to most of the Sicilian towns, which may account for our finding no notice of it in Cicero, though it is mentioned by Strabo among the few cities still subsisting on the north coast of Sicily, as well as afterwards by Pliny, Ptolemy and the Itineraries.

== Location ==
Scholars favor the placement of Agathyrna near Capo d'Orlando or Sant'Agata di Militello. However, in the past Agathyrna's situation had been much disputed, on account of the great discrepancy between the ancient authorities just cited. Strabo places it 30 Roman miles from Tyndaris, and the same distance from Alaesa. The Itinerary gives 28 M. P. from Tyndaris and 20 from Calacte: while the Tabula (of which the numbers seem to be more trustworthy for this part of Sicily than those of the Itinerary) gives 29 from Tyndaris, and only 12 from Calacte. If this last measurement be supposed correct it would exactly coincide with the distance from Caronia (Calacte) to a place near the seacoast called Acquedolci below San Fratello and about 3 km west of Sant'Agata di Militello, where Fazello describes ruins of considerable magnitude as extant in his day: but which he, in common with Cluverius, regarded as the remains of Aluntium. The latter city may, however, be placed with much more probability at San Marco d'Alunzio: and the ruins near San Fratello could thus be those of Agathyrna, there being no other city of any magnitude that we know of in this part of Sicily. Two objections, however, remained: 1. that the distance from this site to Tyndaris is greater than that given by any of the authorities, being certainly not less than 36 miles: 2. that both Pliny and Ptolemy, from the order of their enumeration, appear to place Agathyrna between Aluntium and Tyndaris, and therefore if the former city be correctly fixed at San Marco d'Alunzio, Agathyrna must be looked for to the east of that town. Fazello accordingly placed it near Capo d'Orlando, but admits that there were scarcely any vestiges visible there, and modern scholars continue to accept the identification.
