= PalaFantozzi =

Sports arena in Italy

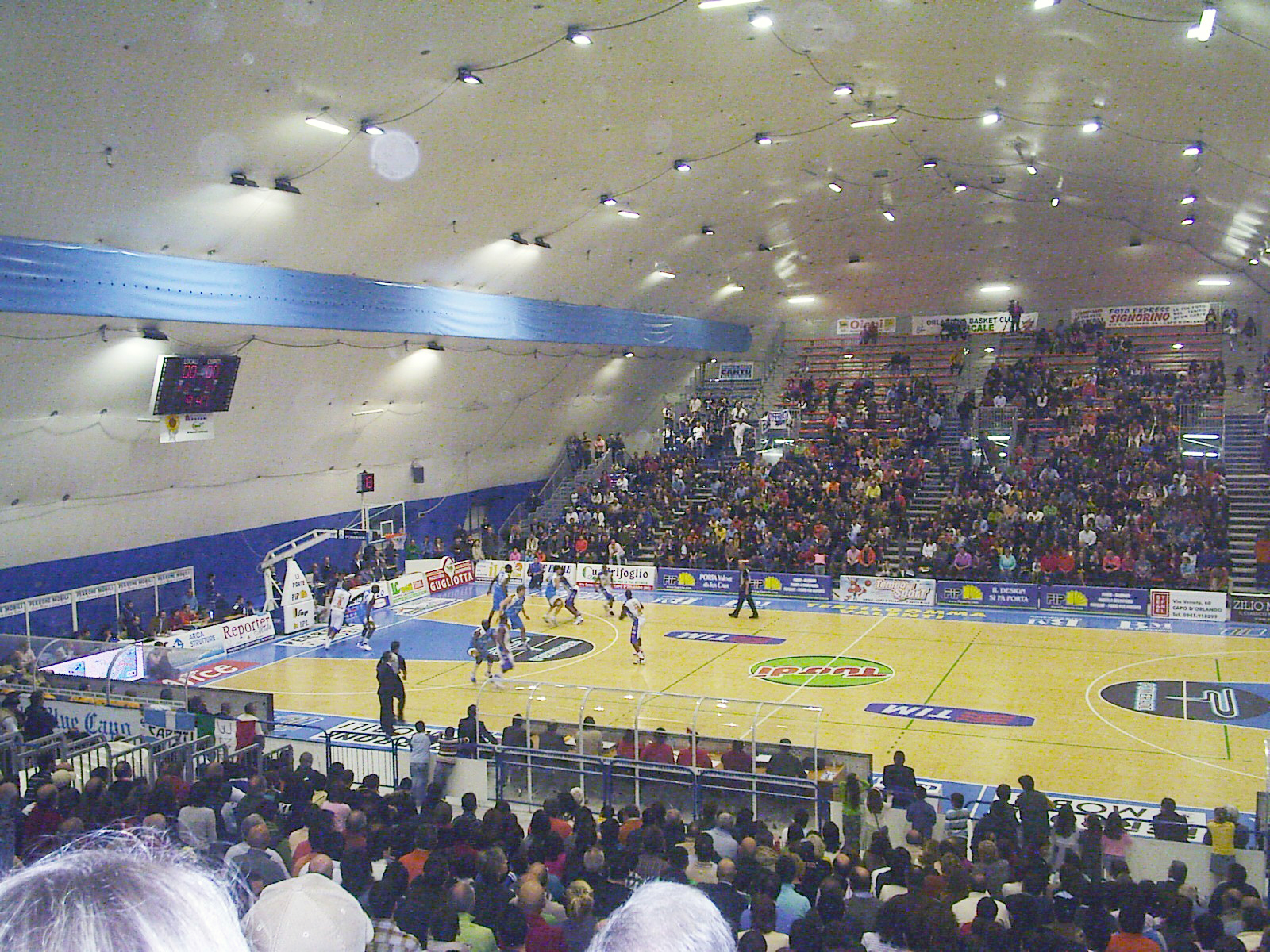
- PalaFantozzi arena
- Interactive map of PalaFantozzi
- Location: Capo d'Orlando, Italy
- Coordinates: 38.16034°N 14.73507°E
- Capacity: Basketball: 3,613
- Surface: Parquet

Construction
- Opened: 2001
- Renovated: 2005
- Expanded: 2005

Tenant
- Orlandina Basket

PalaFantozzi is an indoor sporting arena that is located in Capo d'Orlando, Italy. The arena is named after former Italian professional basketball player, Alessandro Fantozzi. The seating capacity of the arena is 3,613 people.

== History ==
PalaFantozzi originally opened in 2001, and was renovated and expanded in 2005. It has been used as the regular home arena of the Italian League professional basketball club, Orlandina Basket.
