= Canneto, Caronia =

Canneto
- Frazione
- Location of Canneto in Italy
- Coordinates: 38°1′14.19″N 14°23′20.52″E
- Country: Italy
- Region: Sicily
- Metropolitan city: Metropolitan City of Messina (ME)
- Comune: Caronia
- Elevation: 35 m (115 ft)

Population (2010)
  - Total: 154
- Demonym: Cannetani
- Time zone: UTC+1 (CET)
  - Summer (DST): UTC+2 (CEST)
- Postal code: 98072
- Dialing code: 0921

Canneto (Sicilian: Cannìtu ri Carunìa) is a village and civil parish (frazione) of the Italian municipality of Caronia, in the Metropolitan City of Messina, Sicily. In Italian language its name means reed bed.

== Geography ==
The village, also known as Canneto di Caronia, is located by the Tyrrhenian coast, on the state highway 113 Messina-Palermo-Trapani, between Marina di Caronia and Santo Stefano di Camastra. It is 10 km from Caronia, 105 from Palermo and 125 from Messina.

It is crossed by the Messina-Palermo railway but lacks its own station (nearest are Caronia and Santo Stefano di Camastra-Mistretta). The nearest motorway's exit is "Reitano-Santo Stefano di Camastra", on the A20 Messina-Palermo

== History ==
=== Canneto di Caronia fires ===
In 2003–2004 and 2014, there were two series of unusual fires in Canneto. While popular speculation ascribed the fires to various causes due to anomalous circumstances described by witnesses, with hypotheses ranging from an unknown natural phenomenon, to paranormal events, or to secret military technology, officials suggested arson as the cause and arrests were eventually made, though only with respect to the 2014 wave.

Starting from 23 December 2003, Canneto was the central location in a series of spontaneous fires (mainly along the railway line), and other electromagnetic phenomena. Appliances, starting with a television and evidently including a cooker and vacuum cleaner, were reported to catch fire spontaneously. Fires also struck wedding presents and a piece of furniture. At least one person was said to have observed an unplugged electrical cable ignite while he was directly observing it. ENEL, the Italian power utility, temporarily cut off the town's power supply, although the outbreaks continued. The fires stopped in August.

The fires were linked to poltergeists. Suggestions that the cause was an unknown natural phenomenon prompted an investigation by scientists from the National Research Council (CNR), with the support of NASA physicists. In 2007, it was proposed that the phenomena were caused by intermittent electromagnetic emissions. A state of emergency was imposed and part of the village was evacuated. On 24 June 2008, following further investigation by the appointed experts, the case was dismissed by the prosecutor of Mistretta. The conclusion of the consultants was that the fires were arson cases.

Mysterious fires returned again in mid-2014. On 5 March 2015, police arrested and charged Giuseppe Pezzino, 26, with arson, conspiracy to commit fraud, and sounding a false alarm in association with the mysterious fires. His father, Antonino Pezzino, has also been implicated. The Italian military police had installed hidden cameras in the streets after the fires started again in July 2014. Video captured about 40 incidents implicating Giuseppe (and occasionally, Antonino). Further evidence was gathered by phone taps. They were not accused of involvement in the original 2003–2004 wave of events.

== Tourism and culture ==
Canneto di Caronia is a small seaside resort on the Tyrrhenian coast within the Nebrodi Mountains regional park. The village has a pebble beach, clear sea, and is popular in summer with visitors from Messina and Palermo who own or rent holiday homes there.

The village hosts the annual “Festa della Madonna della Luce” (first weekend of August), with processions, fireworks over the sea, and traditional Sicilian food stalls.

Despite its small size, Canneto has attracted niche “mystery tourism” since the widely publicised unexplained fires of 2004–2005 and 2014–2015. Some local operators offer guided walks that mention the events alongside the area’s Greek and Byzantine history and the nearby Gole di Malabotta gorges and Lake Trearie.

== See also ==
- Caronia
- Nebrodi
- List of beaches in Italy

=== Crime ===
- Camorra
- Sicilian Mafia
- Triangle of death (Italy)

=== Purported causes of the Canneto fires ===
Electromagnetic radiation

- Electromagnetic pulse
- Terahertz radiation
  - Far-infrared laser
  - Terahertz metamaterials
  - THz-wave radar
- Weapons/military technology
  - Directed-energy weapon
  - Electronic warfare
    - Active Denial System
    - Electronic countermeasure
      - AN/ALQ-99
      - Radar jamming and deception
    - Electronic-warfare aircraft
      - Boeing EA-18G Growler (US Navy)
      - Tornado ECR (Italian Air Force)

Paranormal phenomena

- Pyrokinesis
