= Halaesa =

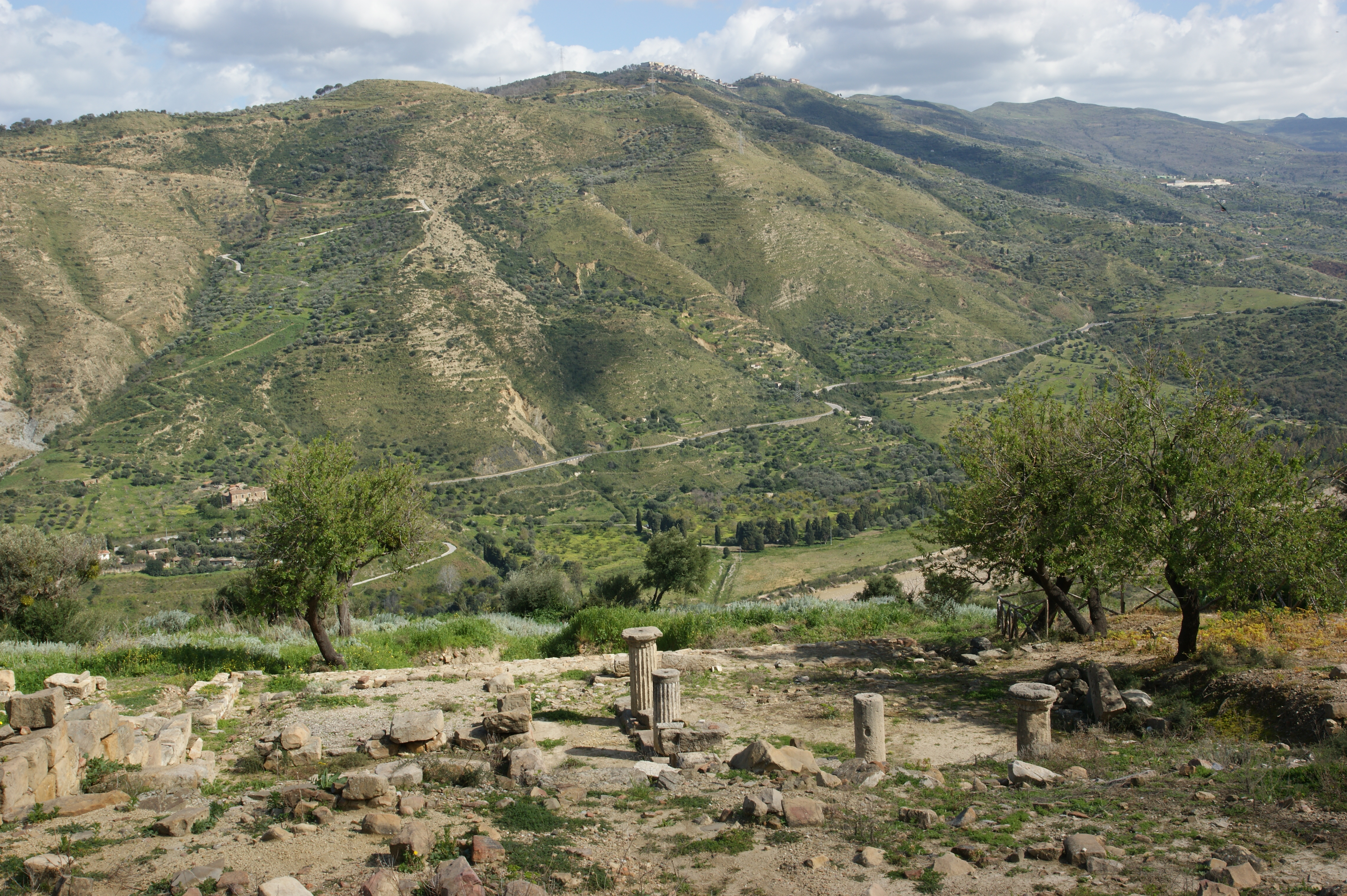
- View of Halaesa

- Location within Sicily
- 37°59′52.76″N 14°15′46.43″E
- Type: Settlement
- Periods: Archaic Greek to Byzantine period
- Cultures: Ancient Greece
- Location: Tusa, Italy

Halaesa (Ancient Greek: Ἅλαισα, Latin: Halaesa), also known as Halaesa Archonidea and also spelled Alaesa or Halesa was an ancient city in Sicily, situated near the north coast of the island, between Cephaloedium (modern Cefalù) and Calacte (modern Caronia).

The site has been partially excavated and a museum contains finds.

== History ==
The city was of Siculian origin; in 403 BC the tyrant Archonides of Herbita (a Siculian city), having concluded peace with Dionysius I of Syracuse, gave the northern part of his territory to the Sicilians as well as to mercenaries and others who had helped him during the war. He named it Halaesa, to which the epithet Archonidea was frequently added for the purpose of distinction. Others attributed the foundation of the city erroneously to the Carthaginians.

It quickly rose to prosperity through maritime commerce. At the start of the First Punic War it was one of the first of the Sicilian cities to submit to the Romans to whose alliance it was always faithful. It was doubtless to this conduct and to the services that it was able to render to the Romans during their wars in Sicily that it was awarded the status of civitas libera ac immunis which gave it the privilege of retaining its own laws and independence, exempt from all taxation, an advantage enjoyed by only five cities of Sicily. In consequence of this advantageous position it rose rapidly in wealth and prosperity and became one of the most flourishing cities of Sicily.

On one occasion its citizens, having been involved in disputes among themselves concerning the choice of their senate, C. Claudius Pulcher was sent by Rome at their own request in 95 BC to regulate the matter by a law, which he did to the satisfaction of all parties. Halaesa is the only place in Sicily where an inscription to a Roman governor of the Roman Republic period (perhaps in 93 BC) has come to light. But their privileges did not protect them from the exactions of Verres, who imposed on them an enormous contribution both in corn and money. Cicero and his cousin visited the city in 70 BC and attended its senate during their collection of evidence for his prosecution of Verres later that year.

Also evidence from inscriptions implies the city safely navigated its way through the Sicilian revolt, as the family Lapiron flourished both before and after the period. The city appears to have subsequently declined, and had sunk in the time of Augustus to the condition of an ordinary municipal town, but was still one of the few places on the north coast of Sicily which Strabo deemed worthy of mention. Pliny also enumerates it among the stipendiariae civitates of Sicily.

== The site ==
There was a difference of opinion on the site of Halaesa, arising principally from the discrepancy in the distances assigned by Strabo, the Antonine Itinerary, and the Tabula Peutingeriana. There is now no doubt that its site is correctly fixed by Cluverius and Torremuzza at the spot marked by an old church called Santa Maria le Palate, near the modern town of Tusa, and above the river Pettineo. This site coincides perfectly with the description of Diodorus, that the town was built on a hill about 8 stadia from the sea: as well as with the distance of 18 Roman miles from Cephaloedium assigned by the Tabula (the Itinerary gives 28 by an easy error).

The ruins described by Fazello as visible in his time indicated the site of a large city, and several inscriptions have been found on the spot, some of them referring distinctly to Halaesa. One of these, which is of considerable length and importance, gives numerous local details concerning the divisions of land, etc., and mentions repeatedly a river "Halaesus", evidently the same with the "Halesus" of Columella, and which is probably the modern Tusa River (also called the Pettineo); as well as a fountain named "Ipybrha". This is perhaps the same spoken of by Solinus and Priscian (Perieges. 500), but without mentioning its name, as existing in the territory of Halaesa, the waters of which were supposedly agitated by the sound of music. Fazello describes the ruins as extending from the sea-shore, on which were the remains of a large building (probably baths), for the space of more than 1.5 km to the summit of a hill, on which were the remains of the citadel. About 5 km further inland was a large fountain (probably the Ipyrrha of the inscription), with extensive remains of the aqueduct that conveyed its waters to the city.

The site has been partially excavated starting in 2017. The agora and theatre are among the monuments so far been brought to light.

Portions of the aqueduct can be seen and fragments of statues, as well as coins and inscriptions, have been frequently discovered on the spot.

== Coinage ==
"Halaisa Archonida" can be found on a Roman coin of the time of Augustus.

== Bibliography ==
- Costanzi, Michela (2023). Halaesa: du site à la cité, de la cité au site. Pisa: Fabrizio Serra Editore. ISBN 9788833154879.
