= Motta d'Affermo =

- Comune
- Comune di Motta d'Affermo
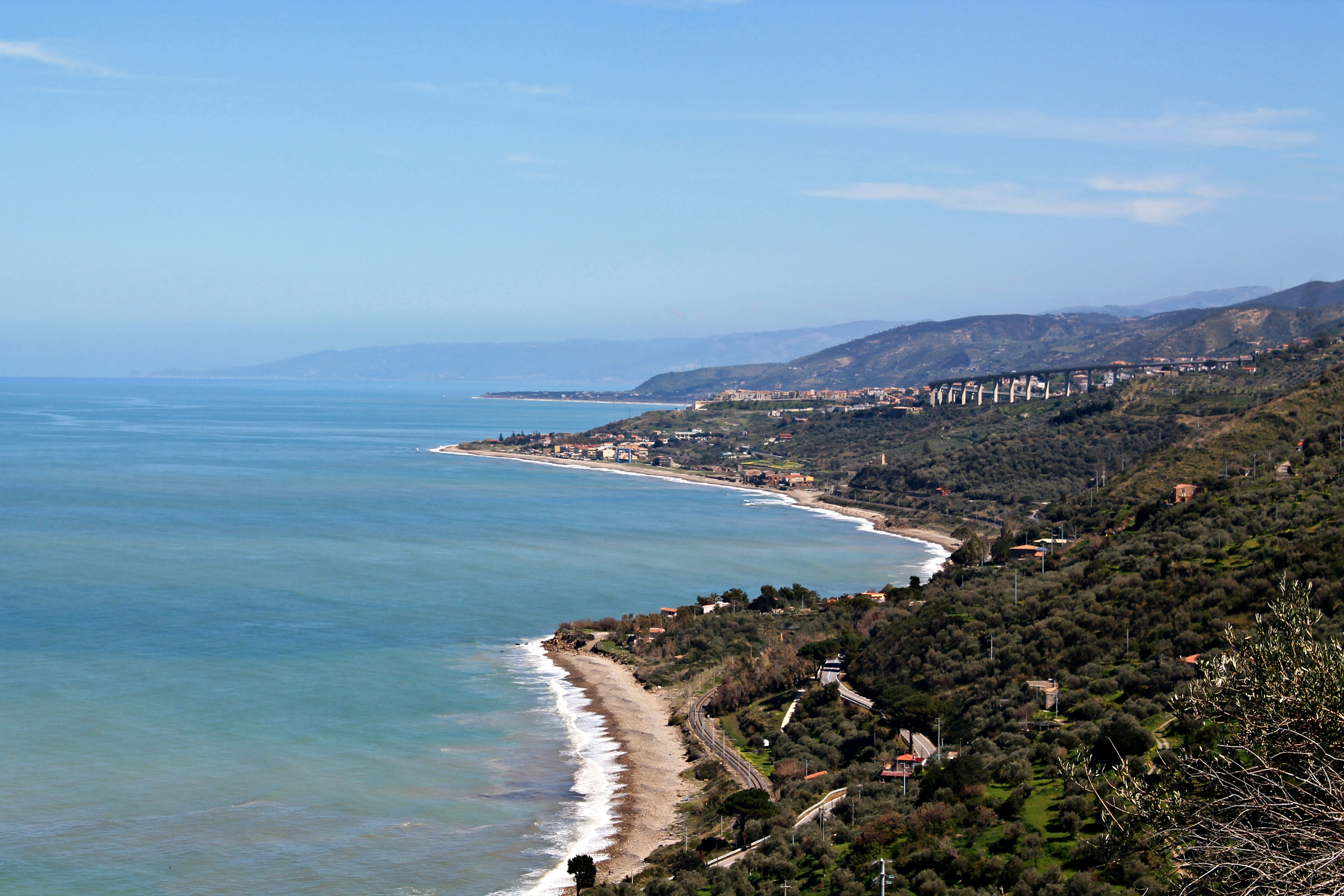

- Location within Italy Location within Sicily
- Coordinates: 37°59′N 14°18′E
- Country: Italy
- Region: Sicily
- Metropolitan city: Messina (ME)
- Frazioni: Torremuzza

Government
  - Mayor: Sebastiano Adamo

Area
  - Total: 14.6 km^{2} (5.6 sq mi)
- Elevation: 660 m (2,170 ft)

Population (30 November 2011)
  - Total: 828
  - Density: 56.7/km^{2} (147/sq mi)
- Demonym: Mottesi
- Time zone: UTC+1 (CET)
  - Summer (DST): UTC+2 (CEST)
- Postal code: 98070
- Dialing code: 0921
- Patron saint: St. Luke, St. Roch
- Website: Official website

Motta d'Affermo (Sicilian: Motta d'Affermu) is a commune in the Province of Messina in the Italian region of Sicily, located about 80 kilometres (50 mi) east of Palermo and about 110 kilometres (68 mi) west of Messina.

Motta d'Affermo borders the following municipalities: Pettineo, Reitano, Tusa.

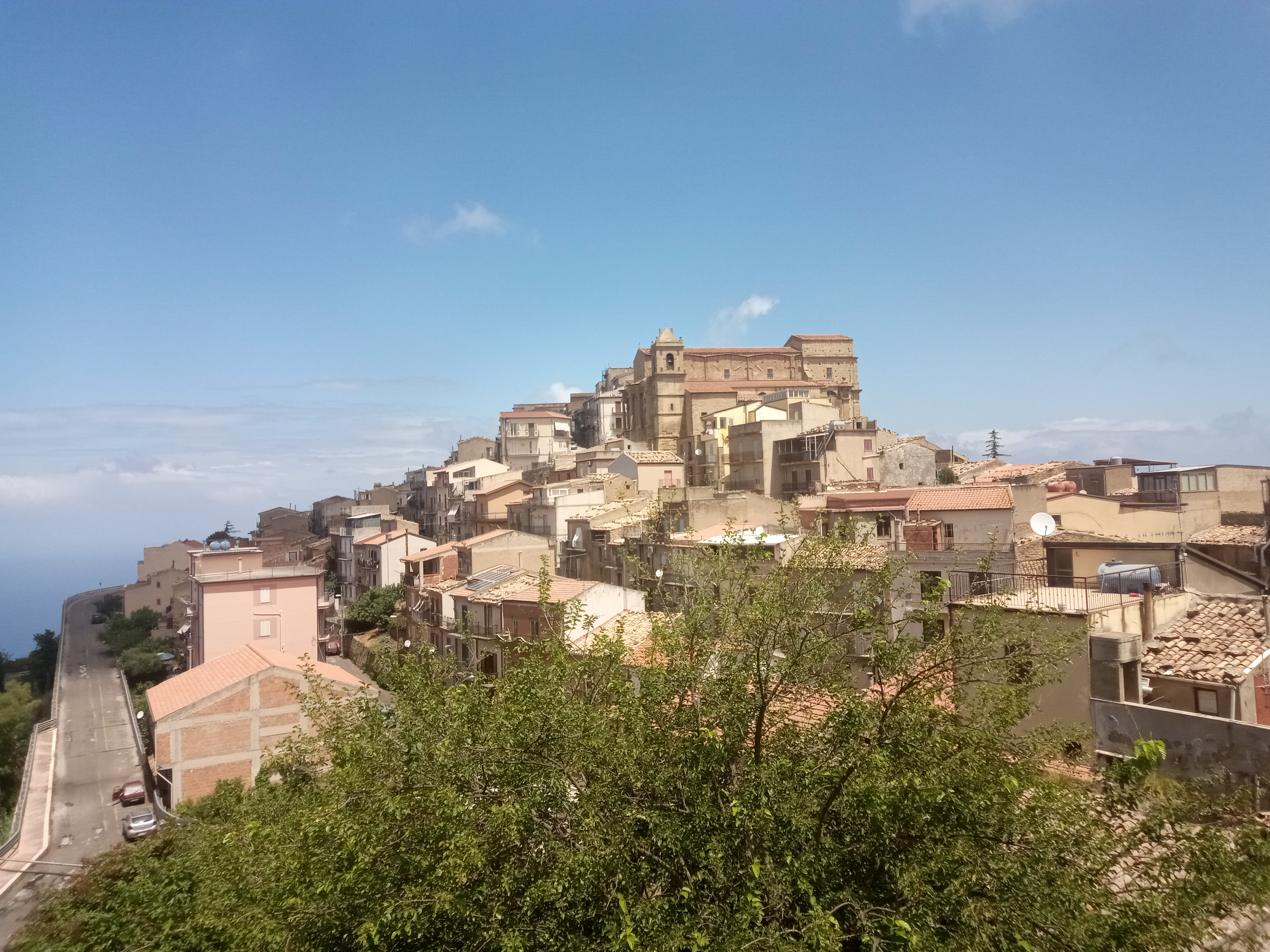
Motta d'Affermo

== Main sights ==
- Mother Church of S. Maria degli Angeli (1380, rebuilt in 1453)
- Church of St. Roch (1657)
- Castle (12th-13th centuries)
- Palazzo Minneci (17th century)
- Torremuzza Tower (13th century)
- Church of St. Peter
