= Gianmarco Pozzecco =

Italian basketball player & coach (born 1972)

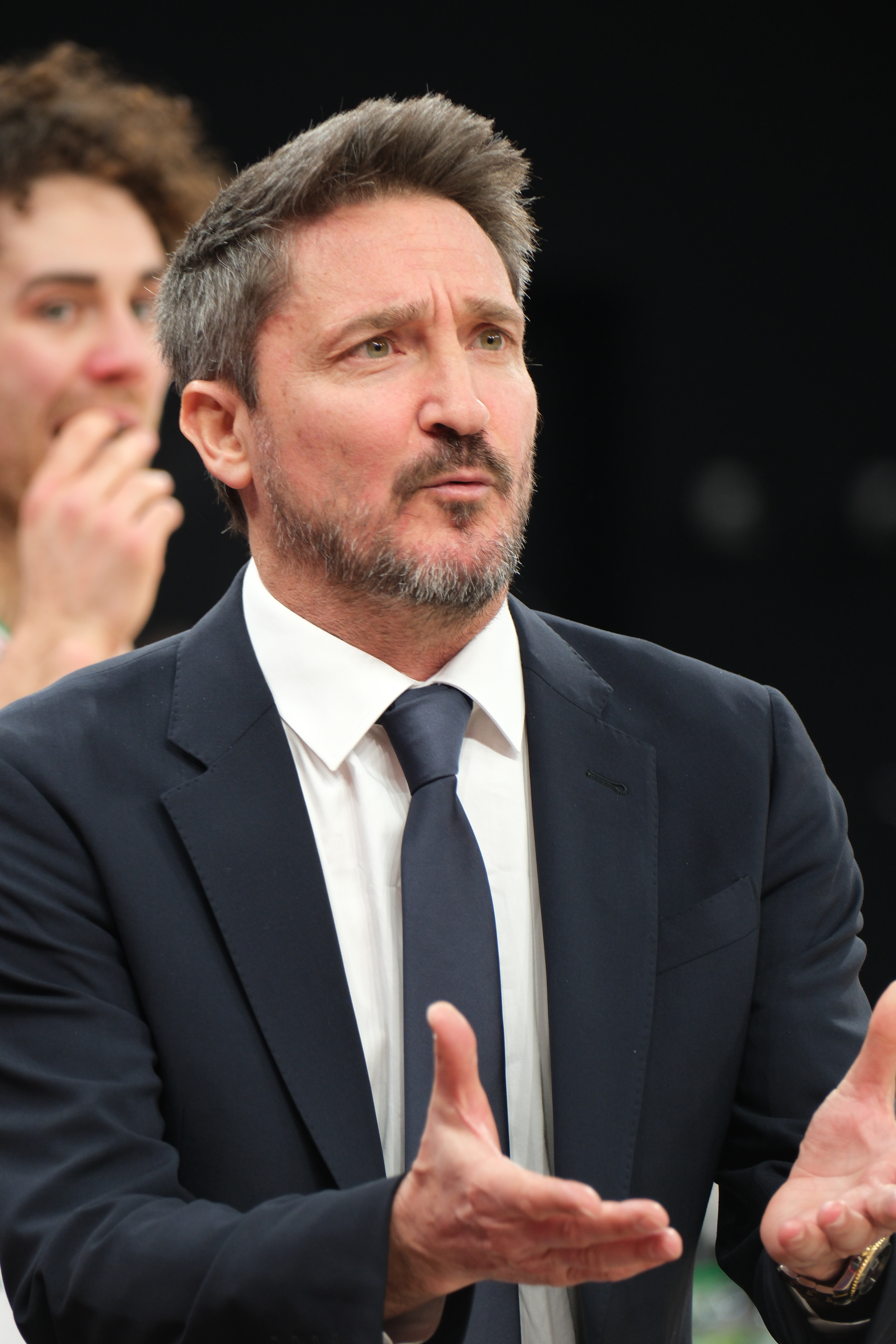
- Pozzecco coaching the Italian national team in 2025

Personal information
- Born: 15 September 1972 (age 54) Gorizia, Italy
- Listed height: 1.81 m (5 ft 11 in)
- Listed weight: 74 kg (163 lb)

Career information
- NBA draft: 1994: undrafted
- Playing career: 1991–2010
- Position: Point guard
- Coaching career: 2012–present

Career history

Playing
- 1991–1993: Udine
- 1993–1994: Libertas Livorno
- 1994–2002: Varese
- 2002–2005: Fortitudo Bologna
- 2005: Zaragoza
- 2005–2007: Khimki
- 2007–2008: Orlandina
- 2009: Servolana Trieste
- 2010: Orlandina

Coaching
- 2012–2014: Orlandina
- 2014–2015: Varese
- 2015–2017: Cedevita (assistant)
- 2018: Fortitudo Bologna
- 2019–2021: Dinamo Sassari
- 2021–2022: Olimpia Milano (assistant)
- 2022–2025: Italy
- 2023–2024: ASVEL
- 2025–2026: Galatasaray

Career highlights
- As Player: 2× Italian League champion (1999, 2005); 2× Italian Supercup champion (1999, 2005); As Assistant Coach: Italian League champion (2022); Italian Cup winner (2022); 2× Croatian League champion (2016, 2017); 2× Croatian Cup champion (2016, 2017); Adriatic League Supercup champion (2017); Zagreb, Croatia Invitational Game winner (2015); As head coach: FIBA Europe Cup champion (2019); Italian Supercup champion (2019); Saturnia, Italy Invitational Game winner (2019)
Medals
Representing Italy
Men's basketball
Olympic Games
Silver medal – second place	2004 Athens	Team competition

Gianmarco Pozzecco (born 15 September 1972) is an Italian professional basketball coach and former player who was the head coach of Italy men's national basketball team.

Pozzecco is one of the best-known figures in the Italian basketball world. As a player, he had a prominent role in Italy's win of the silver medal at the men's basketball tournament at the 2004 Summer Olympics in Athens. He won the Serie A1 1998-1999 and the 1999 Italian Supercup with Varese, and in 2004 he reached the EuroLeague Final Four with Bologna, eventually lost to Maccabi Tel Aviv. He played in the two 1997, the 1998, the 2001 and the 2004 Italian All Star Games, and in the 1999 McDonald's Open Championship. As a coach, Pozzecco won the 2018–19 FIBA Europe Cup and the 2019 Italian Basketball Supercup with Dinamo Sassari.

== Professional career ==
Raised in Trieste, in 1991 he made his debut in A2 with Udine Rex. He stayed at the club the following season, playing in the Serie B d'Eccellenza. In 1993 he moved to Libertas Pallacanestro Livorno where he played for one season. He was then traded to Pallacanestro Varese. With Varese he won the Scudetto in 1999—Varese's 10th title, coming over two decades after the last one—and immediately afterwards the Italian Super Cup. In the 2000–01 season, Pozzecco averaged 27 points in the Lega Basket Serie A.

From 2002 to 2005, he played in Fortitudo Bologna. In 2005, due to conflicts with coach Repeša, he was taken out of the squad, eventually ending the season in Spain, at Basket Zaragoza

In 1997, he was selected for the first time by the Italian national team, during the 1998–99 and 2000–01 seasons he participated in the Italian All Star Game and in 1999 in the McDonald's Championship.

In 2001, he tried to join the NBA franchise, attending the Summer League with the Toronto Raptors, but his attempt was eventually unsuccessful. He had the most assists per game in seven seasons of the Italian League.

In the 2000-01 television season he hosted, together with Samantha De Grenet, the Candid Camera Show on Italia 1.

=== 2004 Summer Olympics ===
Pozzecco joined the Italian national basketball team in 1997 and the following year participated in the World Championship; however, he had some arguments with coach Bogdan Tanjević, who left him out of the talented roster at the EuroBasket 1999, being eventually recalled by new coach Carlo Recalcati. Although he was not called up for the EuroBasket 2003, Pozzecco was part of the Italian expedition to the Athens Olympics.

Italy won the silver medal, after they defeated Argentina, Puerto Rico and Lithuania but lost to Argentina in the final. Pozzecco was the assists leader against New Zealand and Serbia and Montenegro. He posted a double-double of 12 assists, the tournament's game high, 10 points, 4 steals and 4 rebounds against Yao Ming's China, in the penultimate game of the group stage. Pozzecco was the scoring leader in the last and most difficult game of the preliminary round, an eventual 76–75 win over Argentina. He was the assists leader against Puerto Rico in quarterfinals, and against Lithuania in semifinals. Pozzecco also scored 17 points against Lithuania, including 4 three pointers, and was one of the best players of the game. He tied with Soragna for scoring leader in the gold medal game, a rematch against Argentina lost 69–84.

=== Final years (2005–2008) ===
For the 2005–06 season, he moved in Russia, in Moscow, signing an annual contract with Khimki. The contract was then renewed also for the following season, in which the Russian team played in the ULEB Cup.

He returned to Italy for the 2007-08 season. Initially, it seemed he would join Virtus Bologna, but eventually, on 25 July 2007, he signed an annual contract with Orlandina Basket. Pozzecco suddenly renounced to join Virtus Bologna, shortly before signing, because he didn't want to enter in Varese with the Virtus' jersey.

After playing a high-level regular season, averaging almost 18 points and 8 assists per game, Pozzecco stated he wanted to retire from basketball after playing the playoffs.

On 15 May 2008, at the Palasport Giacomo Del Mauro in Avellino he bid farewell to basketball three minutes from the conclusion of the play-off match between Avellino and Capo d'Orlando, when the game had been already decided, with the elimination of the team of Pozzecco. The match was interrupted to allow the athlete to receive the applause of the audience and the players.

In the 2008–09 season, beside collaborating with Gazzetta dello Sport and Sky, Gianmarco Pozzecco wore the jersey of Servolana Trieste, a team playing in the Serie C championship (formerly C2).

In 2009, he joined the Olimpia Milano staff and returned to play in Serie C Dilettanti with the "new" Orlandina Basket, playing a championship game against Amatori Basket Messina, scoring 10 points.

He continued his collaboration with Sky, sometimes commenting on NBA games, and co-presenting the Rhythm and Basket in-depth program. He has also collaborated as a regular commentator with La7 and with Sportitalia in some basketball programs, such as NBA News and a program of in-depth study on the Euroleague and in 2012-2013 he hosted Sotto Canestro together with Italian sports conductor Ugo Francica Nava and basketball player and model Valentina Vignali, a program dedicated to basketball.

== Coaching career ==
=== Orlandina ===
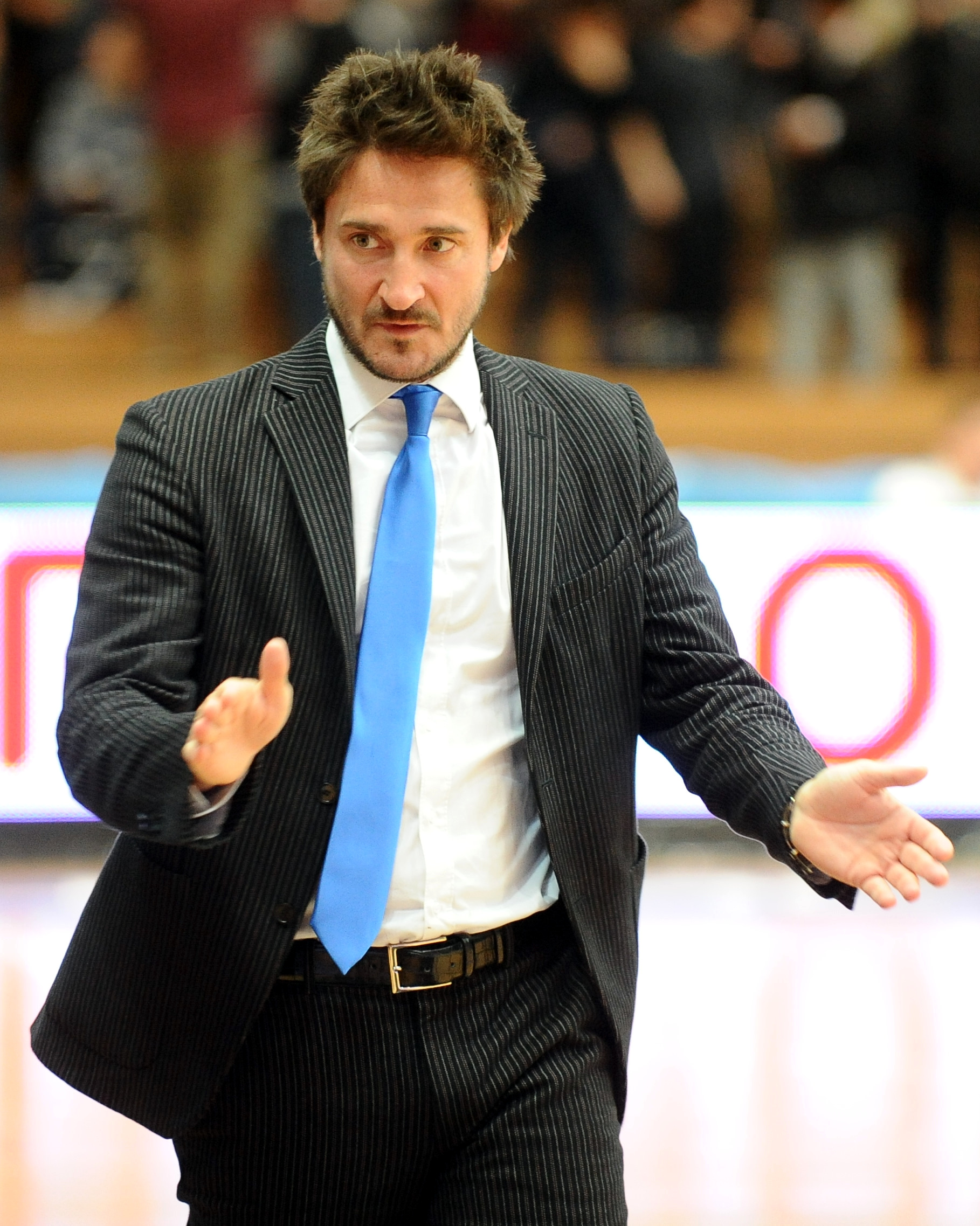
Pozzecco coaching Orlandina Basket in 2013

After his retirement as a player, having spent a few years as a broadcaster for Sky Sport and Sportitalia, on 13 November 2012, he was hired as the head coach of Orlandina Basket, the team with which he ended his playing career.

=== Varese ===
In 2014, he went back to Varese as a head coach. On 3 July 2015 he parted ways with Varese.

=== Cedevita (assistant) ===
A day later, on 4 July 2015, he signed with the Croatian team Cedevita Zagreb to be the team's assistant coach.

=== Fortitudo Bologna ===
On 27 March 2018, he signed a two-year contract to become the head coach of his former club Fortitudo Bologna.

=== Dinamo Sassari ===
On 11 February 2019, Pozzecco signed with Dinamo Sassari of the Italian Lega Basket Serie A (LBA). In his last season in Sassari, Pozzecco went through some difficulties with the management of the team that resulted in his suspension for 10 days right before the beginning of the playoffs. At the end of the season, he prematurely parted ways with Sassari.

=== Olimpia Milano (assistant) ===
On 30 June 2021, Pozzecco joined the Olimpia Milano staff as assistant coach of Ettore Messina. At the end of the season he parted ways with Milano.

=== Italy national team ===
On 2 June 2022, he was named as the new head coach of the senior men's Italy national team, replacing Meo Sacchetti. He resigned on 7 September 2025, after Italy lost to Slovenia in the Round of 16 of EuroBasket.

=== Galatasaray ===
On 31 December 2025, he signed a one-and-a-half-year deal with the Turkish side Galatasaray.

On 16 October 2026, Galatasaray announced that it had parted ways with coach Pozzecco.

== Player profile ==
Standing at 1.81 m (5 ft 11 1/2 in), he played at the point guard position. He had great technical skills, court vision, and shooting ability. He was a player full of fantasy, but weak on defence. He was dubbed as an all-around offensive talent.

He is famous for his eccentric character, and, although it has caused problems for him with coaches through the years, it has made him one of the most valued players in Italy. His nicknames are "Poz" and "La Mosca Atomica" (The Atomic Fly). Although he was born in Gorizia and he grew up as a basketball player in Udine, he is originally from Trieste, and considers himself a triestino.

NBA star Tim Duncan once said that he was impressed by the Italian player.
