= Capo d'Orlando Lighthouse =

Lighthouse in Sicily, Italy

Capo d'Orlando
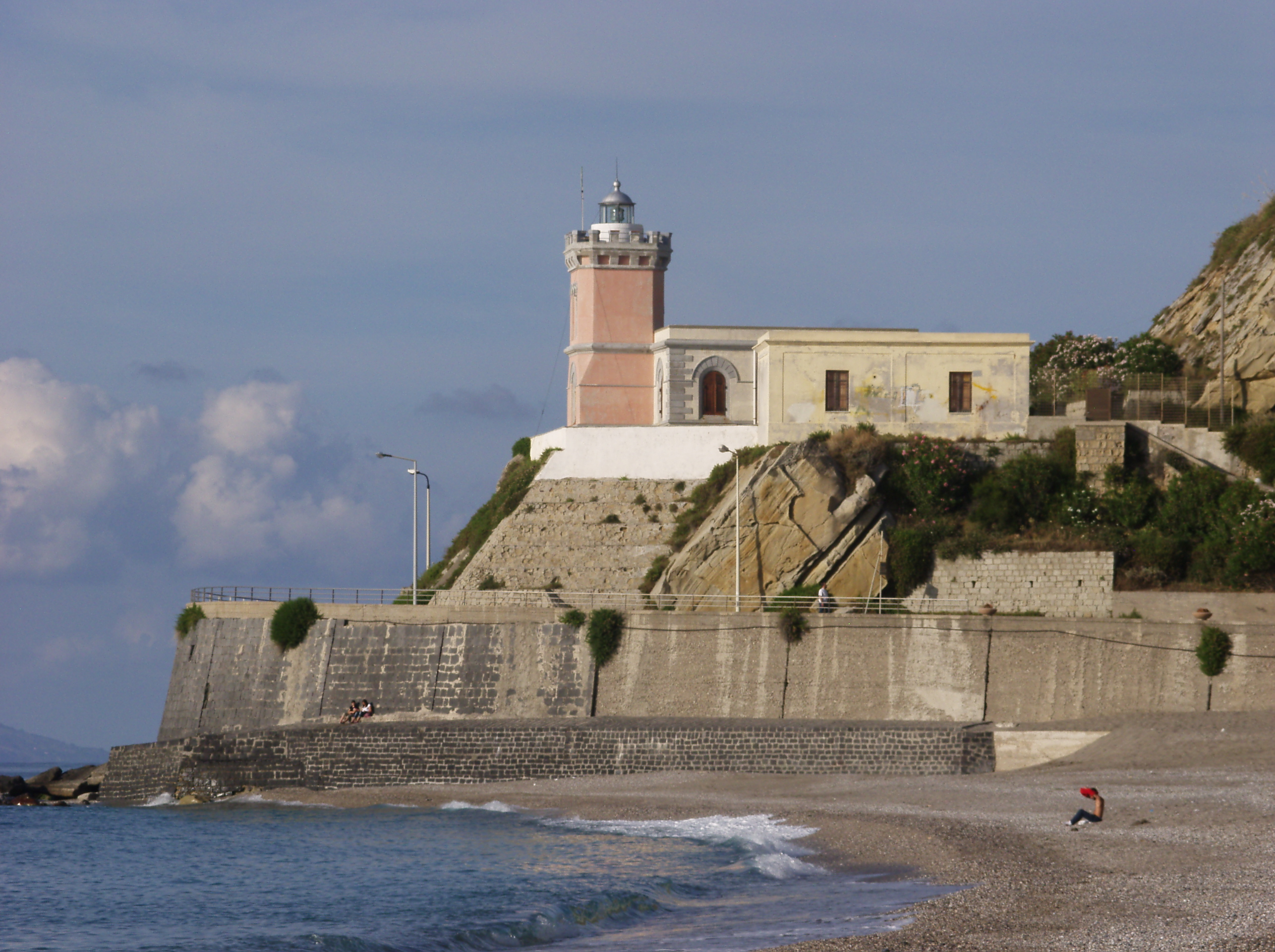
- Capo d'Orlando Lighthouse
- Location: Capo d'Orlando; Sicily; Italy
- Coordinates: 38°09′53″N 14°44′49″E

Tower
- Constructed: 1904
- Foundation: concrete base
- Construction: masonry tower
- Height: 10 metres (33 ft)
- Shape: octagonal tower with balcony and lantern attached to 1-storey keeper's house
- Markings: red terra cotta tower, white trim and lantern, grey metallic lantern dome
- Power source: mains electricity
- Operator: Marina Militare
- Heritage: Italian national heritage
- Fog signal: no

Light
- Focal height: 27 metres (89 ft)
- Lens: Type TD 500 focale length: 250 mm
- Intensity: main: AL 1000 W reserve: LABI 100 W
- Range: mains: 16 nautical miles (30 km; 18 mi) reserve: 12 nautical miles (22 km; 14 mi)
- Characteristic: L Fl (2) W 12s.
- Italy no.: 3264 E.F.

Capo d'Orlando Lighthouse (Italian: Faro di Capo d'Orlando) is an active lighthouse located at the foot of a rocky ridge, north of the municipality of Capo d'Orlando on the Tyrrhenian Sea.

== Description ==
The lighthouse, built in 1904, consists of a masonry octagonal tower, 10 metres (33 ft) high, with balcony and lantern attached to the seaward side of 1-storey keeper's house. The tower, recently painted, is a red terra cotta decorated with white trim, the lantern is white and the lantern dome is grey metallic. The light is positioned at 27 metres (89 ft) above sea level and emits two long white flashes in a 12 seconds period visible up to a distance of 16 nautical miles (30 km; 18 mi). The lighthouse is completely automated and managed by the Marina Militare with the identification code number 3264 E.F.

== See also ==
- List of lighthouses in Italy
