= Villa Romana Bagnoli =

Villa Bagnoli
- Location within Italy
- 38°09′N 14°44′E
- Type: Roman villa
- Cultures: Roman
- Location: Sicily, Italy

History
- Built: early 3rd century AD

Site notes
- Owner: Public

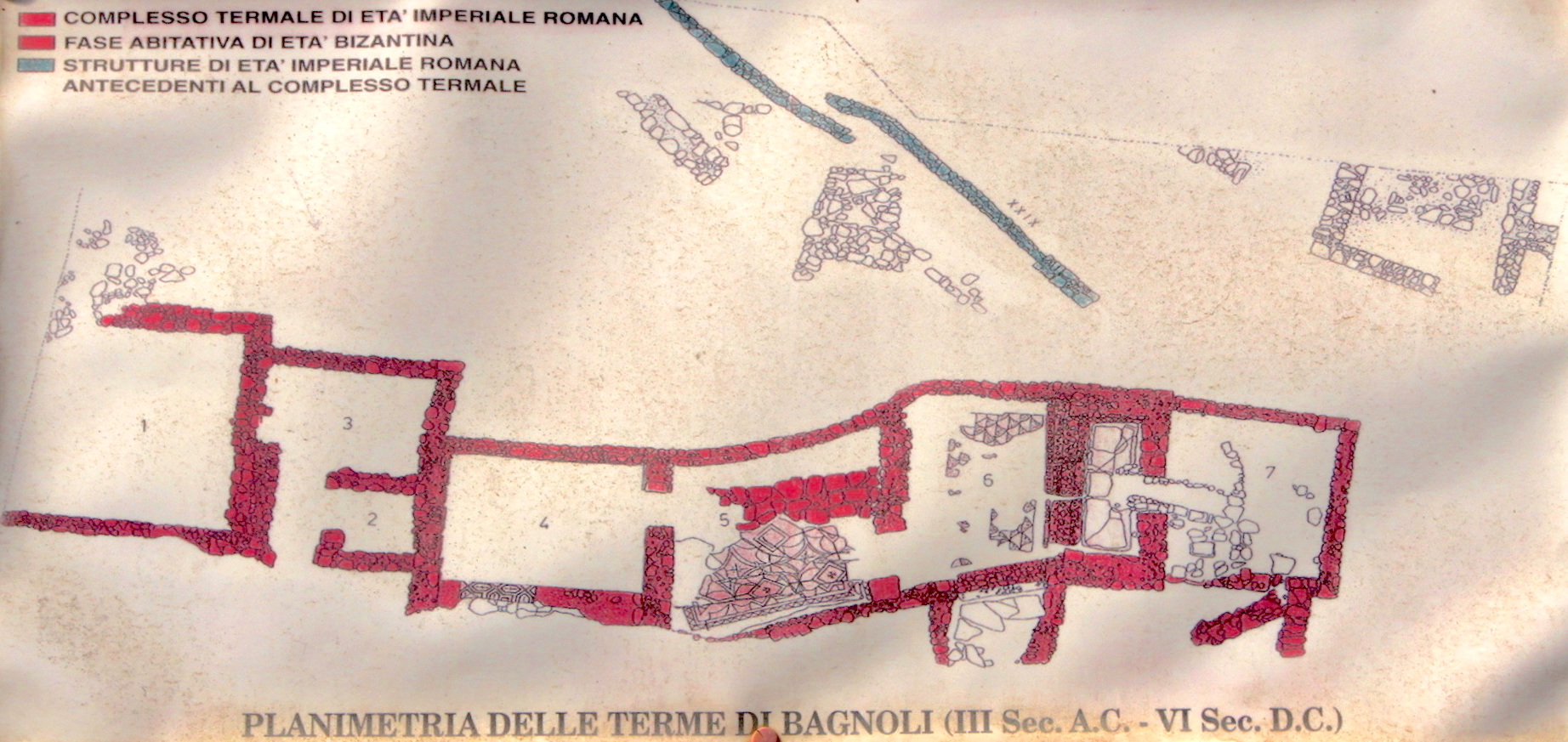
Plan of Villa Romana Bagnoli

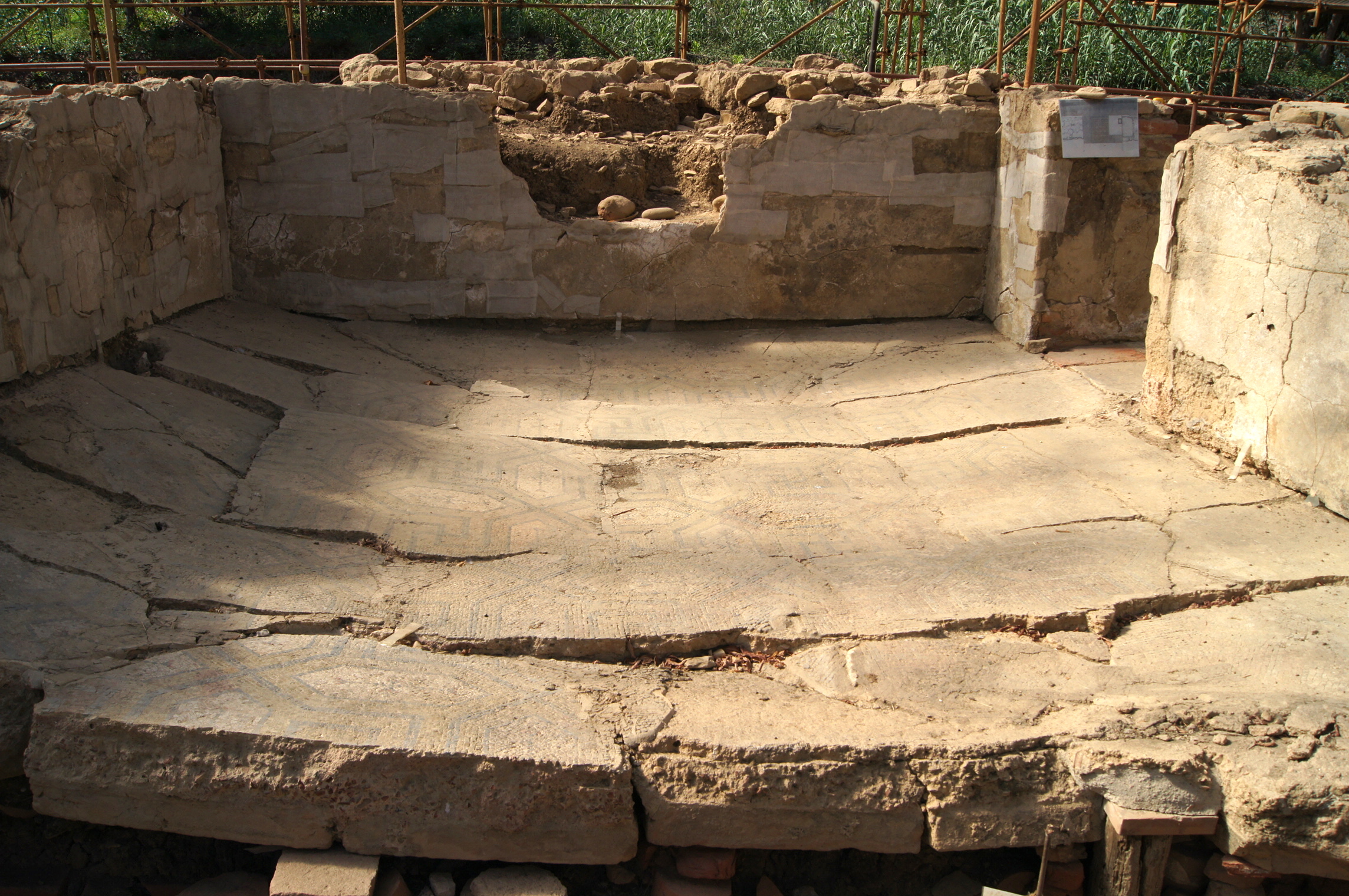
Hypocaust floor

The Roman Villa of Bagnoli is located in contrada Bagnoli-San Gregorio, near the town of Capo d'Orlando, Sicily.

== History and description ==
The site was discovered in 1986 during the construction of a carpark, and subsequent archaeological excavations unearthed part of a luxurious seaside villa dating from the early third century AD.

The rooms explored so far belonged to thermal baths decorated with floor mosaics. Much of the villa remains buried beneath buildings and a road.

Six rooms have been excavated, including a tepidarium (room 4) and a caldarium (rooms 5-6). These rooms have the traditional Roman hypocaust heating system.

The polychrome mosaics of the villa are geometric designs, stylistically close to North African mosaics, and damaged areas suggest figures were also included.

== Sources ==
- U. SPIGO, Prime considerazioni sui mosaici geometrici del complesso termale di Bagnoli S. Gregorio a Capo d’Orlando, in AttiIV Colloquio AISCOM [Palermo 1996], Ravenna 1997, p. 259-272)
