= Monteverdi Marittimo =

- Comune
- Comune di Monteverdi Marittimo
- Coat of arms

- Location within Italy Location within Tuscany
- Coordinates: 43°11′N 10°43′E
- Country: Italy
- Region: Tuscany
- Province: Pisa (PI)
- Frazioni: Canneto

Government
  - Mayor: Francesco Govi

Area
  - Total: 98.7 km^{2} (38.1 sq mi)
- Elevation: 364 m (1,194 ft)

Population (31 December 2010)
  - Total: 784
  - Density: 7.94/km^{2} (20.6/sq mi)
- Demonym: Monteverdini
- Time zone: UTC+1 (CET)
  - Summer (DST): UTC+2 (CEST)
- Postal code: 56040
- Dialing code: 0565
- Website: Official website

Monteverdi Marittimo is a comune (municipality) in the Province of Pisa in the Italian region Tuscany, located about 80 kilometres (50 mi) southwest of Florence and about 60 kilometres (37 mi) southeast of Pisa.
