= Orlandina Basket =

Basketball team

Infodrive Capo d'Orlando
- Leagues: Serie A2 Basket
- Founded: 1978; 48 years ago
- History: Orlandina Basket; 1978–2008; Pallacanestro Nebrodi; 2008–2009; Orlandina Basket; 2009–present
- Arena: PalaFantozzi
- Capacity: 3,613
- Location: Capo d'Orlando, Sicily, Italy
- President: Enzo Sindoni
- Head coach: Marco Cardani
- Website: orlandinabasket.it
Home	Away

Orlandina Basket, known as Infodrive Capo d'Orlando for sponsorship reasons, is an Italian professional basketball club that is based in Capo d'Orlando, Sicily. It plays in the second tier Serie A2 Basket.

Founded in 1978, it was one of the youngest teams of the Serie A 2007-2008 based on foundation date, with in addition being the city with fewest citizens. Financial issues forced the team to restart from the Serie C Dilettanti after being excluded from Serie A in October 2008, but thanks to two promotions and two repechages the team managed to climb back to the upper-most league, where it competed for four years before being relegated to the lower league in 2018.

== History ==
=== Early beginnings ===
After many years of activity in the regional arena, in 1996, after a relegation to Serie C2 with only one victory out of thirty matches, she was taken over by the entrepreneur Enzo Sindoni. The Fiat Vinci Capo d'Orlando (later Nebrodi Gas and from 1998 Upea) largely won its championship (29 wins out of 30 matches) and the following year repeats its success in Serie C1 (26 wins out of 30 matches) reaching Serie B2, led by the Orlandino coach Maurizio Cucinotta.

=== The double promotion ===
In the 1998-99 season, Alessandro Fantozzi, a former national team player, arrives as the new point guard. Orlandina, after a seventh place in the regular season, is eliminated in the first round of the play-offs from Trapani; it is also Cucinotta's last season as head coach paladin. In his place, in the following season (1999-00), Giovanni Papini was hired (replaced during the current championship by Toni Trullo): the Upea of Fantozzi, Caprari and Bortolani centered the promotion to Serie B1 by winning 2-1 in the series final against Cefalù. At the end of the 2000-01 season, the one in which the PalaFantozzi (dedicated to the Livorno playmaker) was inaugurated, the second consecutive promotion arrives: Orlandina conquers the LegaDue through the playoffs, after a second place in the regular season, winning in Pavia.

=== LegaDue: salvation, relegation and repechage ===
In 2001-02, with Carter, Fox, Hill, Mescheriakov and Samake, the team obtained an easy salvation, but the dream was shattered the following season, when the Upea relegated to Serie B1 after an unlucky year. The 2003-04 season, returning to B of Excellence, sees the Epea save themselves in the playout against Castenaso, but in the summer of 2004, thanks to an incredible and unexpected repechage, Enzo Sindoni's club returns to LegaDue.

=== The historic promotion to Serie A ===
In the 2004-05 season, with Giovanni Perdichizzi on the bench, the Orlandina of McIntyre, Hoover, Oliver and Howell lost just three games (27-3) and was promoted to first place in Serie A1. In February he also won the LegaDue Cup. It thus becomes the fifth Sicilian team to play in the top division, the third after the war. After the 40s with Giglio Bianco Catania and Palermo, in fact, in the 90s and 2000s, Trapani and Messina played in Serie A for only one season.

=== First stint in Serie A (3 years) ===
In 2005-06 he saved himself on the last day against Roseto, becoming the first Sicilian team to keep the category for more than a season. In 2006-07 the president Sindoni, new mayor of Capo d'Orlando, was forced to rebuild the team from scratch, starting from Perdichizzi and with the only confirmations of Esposito and Fabi [2]. The team, after a good start, is saved again on the last day, winning at home against Reggio Emilia. At the end of the season, the paths of Orlandina and coach Perdichizzi separate. In the summer, his place is taken by Meo Sacchetti.

In 2007-08 President Sindoni hires Gianmarco Pozzecco, silver medalist at the 2004 Summer Olympics and player of absolute value. Also important are the signings of the Americans Wallace, Slay and Diener, and the return of Howell, one of the architects of the promotion in A1. At the end of the first round, Sacchetti's team wins the right to participate in the Final Eight of the Italian Cup, being eliminated in the quarter-finals by Biella. Having sold scorer Diener to Siena, Orlandina landed two more important hits on the market, signing Beck from Varese and young Mejía from the D-League; these grafts, in addition to the recovery of Colin Falls, are decisive for maintaining the high positions of the ranking. On April 17, 2008, again against Biella, Orlandina writes another page in its basketball history, gaining access to the Scudetto play-off for the first time, thanks to the away victory on the Piedmontese field, and concluding the regular season. in sixth place.

The quarter-final sees Avellino win the series 3-0, after 3 hard-fought matches. The match that sanctions Orlandina's elimination from the play-offs is also the last match of Gianmarco Pozzecco, the undisputed leader of the team, who thus closes his career. The results of the other quarter-finals still allow Orlandina to obtain the historic qualification for the Eurocup.

The 2008-09 season is not played by Orlandina since on 20 September 2008 the federal council announced the exclusion of the team from the championship alongside Basket Napoli.

=== Restarting from Serie C: back-to-back promotions ===
The company's activity restarts in 2009-10, when Pallacanestro Nebrodi, a team from Capo d'Orlando that in the previous season had played in the Promotion championship and finished in last place, was admitted to Serie C Dilettanti thanks to the acceptance of the application of repechage presented to the Lega Nazionale Pallacanestro in place of the Folgore Nocera and obtaining the change of name in Orlandina Basket. Gianmarco Pozzecco, coach of Upea from November 2012 until the end of the 2013/14 season.

The season ends with first place and promotion to Serie B Amateur with six rounds to spare. Among the basketball players who played the 2009-2010 season with the Orlandina shirt there are Giuseppe Costantino and Gianmarco Pozzecco who played a game two years after retiring from professional basketball.

In the 2010-11 season, after the first place reached in the regular season in group D of Serie B Dilettanti, Orlandina obtained promotion to Serie A Dilettanti by winning the play-off final series (2-1) against Viola Reggio Calabria.

On 13 September 2011 Giovanni Perdichizzi was announced as the new coach, replacing Giuseppe Condello. With Perdichizzi, Orlandina is eliminated in the playoff quarter-finals of A dilettanti from Basket Recanati.

=== Back to LegaDue ===
In the following summer, the paladin formation was fished out in LegaDue. The return season in LegaDue begins with coach Massimo Bernardi, who was subsequently sacked after 6 defeats in as many league games. In place of him, on November 16, 2012, Gianmarco Pozzecco arrives, in his first experience as head coach. After closing the season in eleventh position, close to the playoffs, Upea extends the contract to coach Gianmarco Pozzecco and subsequently hires experienced players such as Gianluca Basile, Matteo Soragna and Sandro Nicević in the summer market. The 2013-14 vintage sees Orlandina close the regular season in second position and then make a great ride in the play-offs, eliminating first Sigma Barcelona in the quarterfinals, then Tezenis Verona in the semifinals, only surrendering in the final against the Aquila Basket Trento (promoted to Serie A). On 8 June 2014, two days after the end of the championship, the farewell of Gianmarco Pozzecco is announced, who will end his experience as an Upea coach with 39 wins and 24 defeats; in his place comes Giulio Griccioli, leaving Casale Monferrato.

=== Second stint in Serie A (4 years) ===
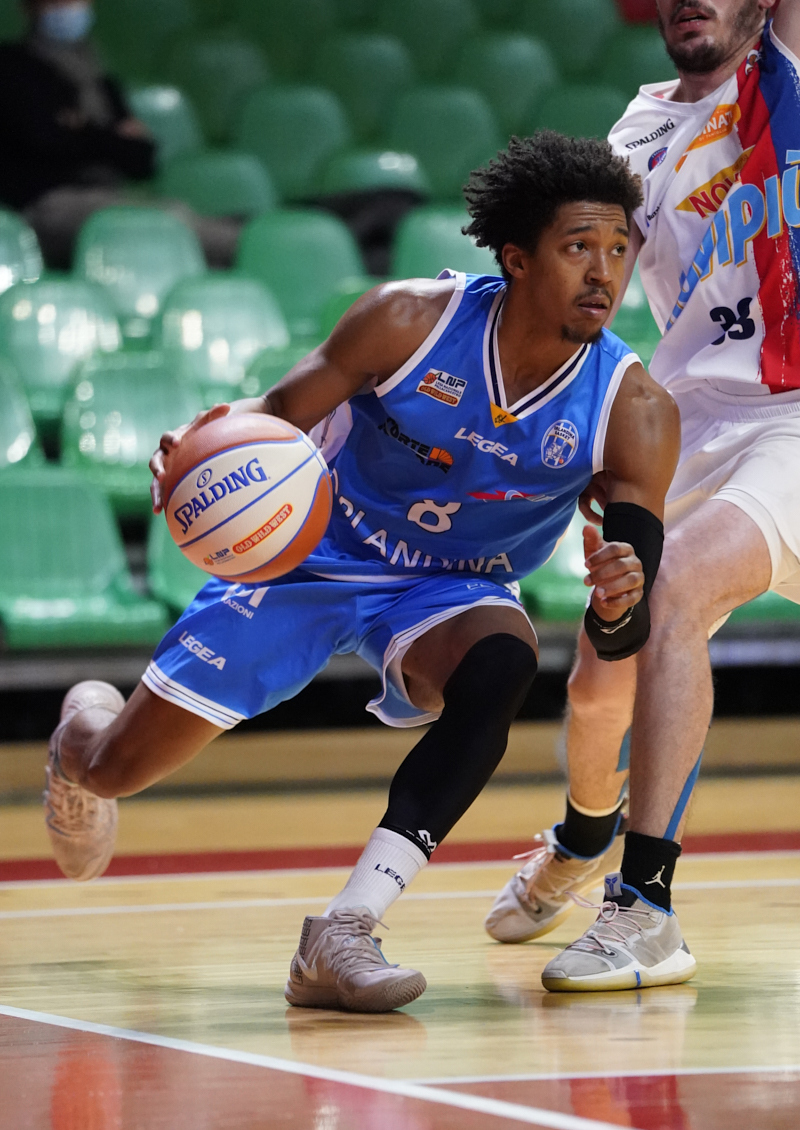
Jordan Floyd, 2021.

On 18 July 2014, being the first to have the right to repechage, Orlandina is promoted to Serie A in place of Montepaschi Siena, after the latter went bankrupt. During the setting up of the roster, to the reconfirmations Basile, Soragna and Nicević, another man of experience and former national team like Andrea Pecile joined the team. The season ends with an easy salvation obtained with four rounds to spare.

Orlandina concluded the 2016-17 championship in eighth position and qualified for the play-offs, being eliminated by Olimpia Milano in the quarter-finals after having won Game 1 on the road in Milan with the score of 80–87. This was also the team's first LBA play-off game win. Following the resignation of Pistoia, Orlandina qualified for the Basketball Champions League (BCL) for the 2017–18 season after defeating Academic Sofia in the qualifying round; the team advanced to the regular season where it finished last in its group. In the 2017-2018 season of Serie A following the defeat against Cremona for 119-95 he relegated to Serie A2. In the 2018-2019 season the team qualified for the play-offs and reached the final, being defeated by Universo Treviso Basket.

== Colors and logo ==
The team colors are white and blue. Exclusively for the 2008 Italian Cup Final Eight, the game shirt became yellow and red, the colors of the Sicilian flag. For the 2012/2013, 2013/2014 and 2014/2015 seasons, the away game jersey was black. The symbol of the Orlandina Basket is a paladin. During the 2013/2014 season, "Dino il Paladino" became the team's official mascot.

== Arena ==
At the beginning of its history, Orlandina Basket, disputed its matches in the courtyard of the elementary schools of Capo d'Orlando, outdoors. In the following years, with the team called Fiat Vinci, Nebrodi Gas and then Upea, the home games were played at the PalaValenti on the Lungomare Andrea Doria, until the middle of the 2000/2001 season.

On 25 February 2001, during the nineteenth day of the Serie B Championship (Upea Orlandina Basket-Banca Sant'Angelo Trapani), the PalaFantozzi was inaugurated in Piazza Peppino Bontempo; it's named after former Orlandina star Alessandro Fantozzi. The PalaFantozzi, then renovated in the summer of 2005 to increase the capacity in view of Serie A, is today the current Orlandina Basket facility, with a capacity of 3,613 spectators.

== Season by season ==
Promotion	Relegation	Repechage

Season	Tier	League	Pos.	Notes	European competitions	
1995-96	5	Serie C1	16th	Relegated to Lower League		
1996-97	6	Serie C2	1st	Promoted to Upper League		
1997-98	5	Serie C1	1st	Promoted to Upper League		
1998-99	4	Serie B2	7th			
1999-2000	4	Serie B2	1st	Promoted to Upper League		
2000-01	3	Serie B Eccellenza	2nd	Wins Playoffs, Promoted to Upper League		
2001-02	2	Legadue	10th			
2002-03	2	Legadue	14th	Relegated to Lower League		
2003-04	3	Serie B Eccellenza	13th	Wins Playouts to maintain league, repechage to upper league		
2004-05	2	Legadue	1st	Wins 2nd-tier Italian Cup, Promoted to Upper League		
2005-06	1	Serie A	16th			
2006-07	1	Serie A	14th			
2007-08	1	Serie A	6th	Playoffs quarterfinalist, excluded from following year's championship due to financial issues		
2008-09	N/A	N/A	N/A	Buys league title of Pallacanestro Nebrodi to enter Serie C Dilettanti the following year		
2009-10	5	Serie C Dilettanti	1st	Wins 5th-tier Italian Cup, Promoted to Upper League		
2010-11	4	Serie B Dilettanti	1st	Wins Playoffs, Promoted to Upper League		
2011-12	3	Divisione Nazionale A	3rd	Playoffs Quarterfinalist, repechage to upper league		
2012-13	2	Legadue	11th	2nd-tier Italian Cup First Round		
2013–14	2	LNP Gold	2nd	Playoffs Finalist, repechage to upper league		
2014–15	1	LBA	14th			
2015–16	1	LBA	13th			
2016–17	1	LBA	8th	Italian Cup Quarterfinalist		
2017–18	1	LBA	16th	Relegated to Lower League	3 Champions League	RS
2018-19	2	Serie A2	2nd	Playoffs Finalist		
2019-20	2	Serie A2	13th			
2020-21	2	Serie A2	11th			
2021-22	2	Serie A2	TBD	Season in progress		

== Players ==
=== Current roster ===
Orlandina Basket roster
Players
Coaches

Pos.	No.	Nat.	Name	Ht.	Wt.	Age
C	0	(Senegal)	Diouf, Modou	2.03 m (6 ft 8 in)	91 kg (201 lb)	26 – 2 September 1999
F	1	(United States)	Mack, Tevin	1.98 m (6 ft 6 in)	103 kg (227 lb)	29 – 1 May 1997
PG	4	(United Kingdom)	Ellis, Quinn	1.84 m (6 ft 0 in)	65 kg (143 lb)	23 – 1 April 2003
PG	6	(Italy)	Gay, Flavio	1.85 m (6 ft 1 in)	75 kg (165 lb)	28 – 7 March 1998
F	7	(Italy)	Bartoli, Vittorio	2.01 m (6 ft 7 in)	99 kg (218 lb)	24 – 11 June 2002
P	9	(Italy)	Lagana, Matteo (C)	1.89 m (6 ft 2 in)	87 kg (192 lb)	26 – 10 January 2000
F	12	(Italy)	Poser, Federico	2.03 m (6 ft 8 in)	104 kg (229 lb)	26 – 17 August 1999
F	13	(Latvia)	Klasinskis, Ricards	2.00 m (6 ft 7 in)	100 kg (220 lb)	23 – 1 January 2003
SG	16	(Italy)	Vecerina, Simone	1.96 m (6 ft 5 in)	91 kg (201 lb)	26 – 5 October 1999
SG	25	(Italy)	Reggiani, Francesco	1.95 m (6 ft 5 in)	85 kg (187 lb)	24 – 6 January 2002
G/F	55	(United States)	King, Nick	2.01 m (6 ft 7 in)	102 kg (225 lb)	30 – 5 August 1995

Head coach

- (Italy) Marco Cardani

Assistant coach(es)

- (Italy) David Sussi
- (Italy) Edoardo Rabbolini

Athletic trainer(s)

- (Italy) Antonio Fazio

Physiotherapist(s)

- (Italy) Biagio Di Giorgio

Team manager

- (Italy) Antonio Sapone

Legend

- (C) Team captain
- Injured

- Roster
Updated: November 8, 2021

=== Notable players ===
- (Italy) Gianluca Basile 3 seasons: '13–'16
- (Italy) Matteo Soragna 2 seasons: '13–'15
- (Italy) Gianmarco Pozzecco 1 seasons: '07–'08
- (United States) Keith Carter 2 seasons: '01–'02, '05–'06
- (United States) Otis Hill 1 season: '01–'02
- (Mali) Soumaila Samake 1 season: '01–'02
- (United States) Henry Turner 1 season: '02–'03
- (United States) James Robinson 1 season: '02–'03
- (United States) Karim Shabazz 1 season: '02–'03
- (Italy) - (United States) Brian Oliver 1 season: '04–'05
- (United States) Terrell McIntyre 1 season: '04–'05
- (United States) Marque Perry 1 season: '05–'06
- (Latvia) Kristaps Janicenoks 1 season: '05–'06
- (France) - (Bulgaria) Vassil Evtimov 1 season: '05–'06
- (Greece) - (Serbia and Montenegro) Dusan Jelic Koutsopoulos 1 season: '05–'06
- (Italy) Vincenzo Esposito 1 season: '05–'06
- (United States) Alvin Young 1 season: '06–'07
- (United States) Jayson Wells 1 season: '06–'07
- (France) Hervé Touré 1 season: '06–'07
- (Lithuania) Virginijus Praškevičius 1 season: '05–'06
- (Lithuania) Martynas Mažeika 1 season: '07–'08
- (Lithuania) Simas Jasaitis 4 seasons: '15–'16, '23-present
- (Lithuania) Arnoldas Kulboka 1 season: '17–'18
- (Poland) Adam Wojcik 1 season: '07–'08
- (United States) Dario Hunt
- (Finland) Shawn Huff

== Palmarès ==
- Campionato di Legadue: 1

2004-05

- Coppa Italia di Legadue: 1

2005

- Coppa Italia LNP di Serie C Dilettanti: 1

2009-10

== Sponsorship names ==
- Fiat Vinci Capo d'Orlando: (1996–1997)
- Nebrodi Gas Capo d'Orlando: (1997–1998)
- UPEA Capo d'Orlando: (1998–2007, 2009-2015)
- Pierrel Capo d'Orlando: (2007–2008)
- Betaland Capo d'Orlando: (2015–2018)
- Benfapp Capo d’Orlando: (2018-2019)
- SikeliArchivi Capo d'Orlando (2017; in European competitions)
- Infodrive Capo d’Orlando: (2021–present)

== Rivalries ==
The rivalries in the 90s and at the beginning of the 2000s were with Patti Basketball and Cefalù Basketball in Serie B and C. In the last decade, the most prevailing rivalries are with Viola Reggio Calabria in Serie B and Barcelona Basketball in Legadue. There are relations with Juvecaserta

== Organized supporters ==
The historic group of organized fans was I Pitbull, active in the years of Orlandina Basket at PalaValenti. In 2001 the White Blue Capo, a large group, were formed, then disbanded at the end of 2007. Part of the "White Blue Capo" then formed the Capo d'Orlando Supporters, then disbanded at the end of the 2007/2008 season after the exclusion of the Orlandina Basket from Serie A. The Banda Nuautri, born in 2003, was the longest-lived group: it accompanied Orlandina in the years of Serie A and in those of the restart from C. Dissolved at the end of the 2013/2014 season after more than a decade alongside Orlandina Basket, part of the band formed the group The Wrong Side. From the 2017/2018 season there will also be the Sixth Man Club Orlandina Basket with Senior presidents: Leuccio Tonarelli and Salvatore Scarpuzza instead Junior the president is Giuseppe Tonarelli and the deputy Gabriele Minissale

- I Pitbull: (1996-2001)
- White Blue Capo: (2001-2007)
- Banda Nuautri: (2003-2014)
- Capo d'Orlando Supporters: (2007–2008)
- The Wrong Side: (2014–present)
- Sesto Uomo Club Orlandina Basket: (2017–present)
