= Canneto di Caronia fires =

Series of fires in Sicily, Italy

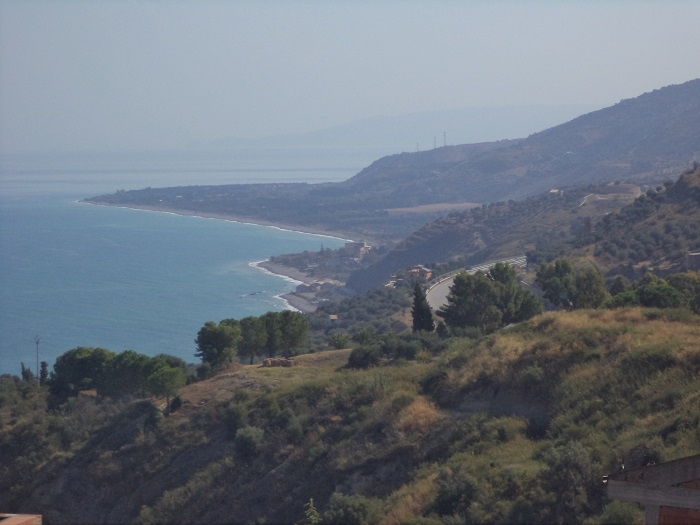
Canneto di Caronia

In 2003–2004, there was a series of unusual fires in Canneto di Caronia, Sicily (Italy). Although popular speculation ascribed the fires to paranormal activity or secret military technology due to the purportedly anomalous circumstances surrounding the events, official investigations concluded that the fires were cases of arson.

== 2003–04 events ==
Canneto di Caronia is a village in Sicily, home to roughly 150 people.

Events began on 23 December 2003 at Antonino Pezzino's home on Via Mare, when Pezzino's television reportedly exploded. Similar malfunctions reportedly affected fuse boxes, air conditioners, kitchen appliances, computers, and electronic car door locks. Fires were also said to have struck wedding presents and a piece of furniture. At least one person was said to have observed an unplugged electrical cable ignite while he was directly observing it.

On 9 February 2004, two houses on Via Mare burned. In response, Mayor Spinnato issued an order evacuating the 39 residents of Via Mare from their homes to the town's only hotel. ENEL, the Italian power utility, cut power to the town, but fires continued. From January through to March, a total of 92 fires were reported.

On 11 February, an investigation was announced by the local prosecutor. On 16 March, fires resumed, and investigators reportedly witnessed malfunctions in compasses, electronic car locks, and cell phones.

In April, the government formed an interdisciplinary research group, coordinated by Francesco Venerando Mantegna from the Sicilian Protezione Civile. That team reportedly had widespread cooperation from the nation's armed forces, police, as well as utilities. Venerando's team reported anomalous "electromagnetic activity", unexplained lights, and a helicopter that experienced allegedly anomalous rotor damage. Scientists from the National Research Council (CNR), with the support of NASA physicists, were also involved in investigating the events.

In June 2004, residents were returned to their homes on Via Mare.

Explanations for the events have ranged from the mundane to the paranormal. Public speculation attributed the events to poltergeists, demons, or UFOs. In 2007, it was proposed that the phenomena were caused by intermittent electromagnetic emissions. On 24 June 2008, following further investigation by the appointed experts, the case was dismissed by the prosecutor of Mistretta. The conclusion of the consultants was that the fires were arson cases.

== 2014–15 events ==
Mysterious fires returned in mid-2014. On 5 March 2015, police arrested and charged Giuseppe Pezzino, 26, with arson, conspiracy to commit fraud, and sounding a false alarm in association with the mysterious fires. His father, Antonino Pezzino, has also been implicated. The Italian military police had installed hidden cameras in the streets after the fires started again in July 2014. Video captured about 40 incidents implicating Giuseppe (and occasionally, Antonino). Further evidence was gathered by phone taps. The Pezzinos were not accused of involvement in the original 2003–2004 wave of events.

== In popular culture ==
The fires were featured in the U.S. television program The Unexplained Files. In 2019, the fires were featured on the program Unidentified: Inside America's UFO Investigation.
