= Castel di Lucio =

- Comune
- Comune di Castel di Lucio
- Location within Italy Location within Sicily
- Coordinates: 37°53′N 14°19′E
- Country: Italy
- Region: Sicily
- Metropolitan city: Messina (ME)

Government
  - Mayor: Giuseppe Franco

Area
  - Total: 28.4 km^{2} (11.0 sq mi)
- Elevation: 753 m (2,470 ft)

Population (30 November 2011)
  - Total: 1,371
  - Density: 48.3/km^{2} (125/sq mi)
- Demonym: Castelluccesi
- Time zone: UTC+1 (CET)
  - Summer (DST): UTC+2 (CEST)
- Postal code: 98070
- Dialing code: 0921
- Patron saint: St. Placidus
- Saint day: 5 October
- Website: Official website

Castel di Lucio (Sicilian: Castiddruzzu) is a comune (municipality) in the Province of Messina in the Italian region Sicily, located about 90 kilometres (56 mi) southeast of Palermo and about 110 kilometres (68 mi) southwest of Messina. Castel di Lucio borders the following municipalities: Geraci Siculo, Mistretta, Nicosia, Pettineo, San Mauro Castelverde. In ecclesiastical geography, Castel di Lucio is at the far western end of the Roman Catholic Diocese of Patti. The town is situated in the northwestern part of the Nebrodi mountain range.

== History ==
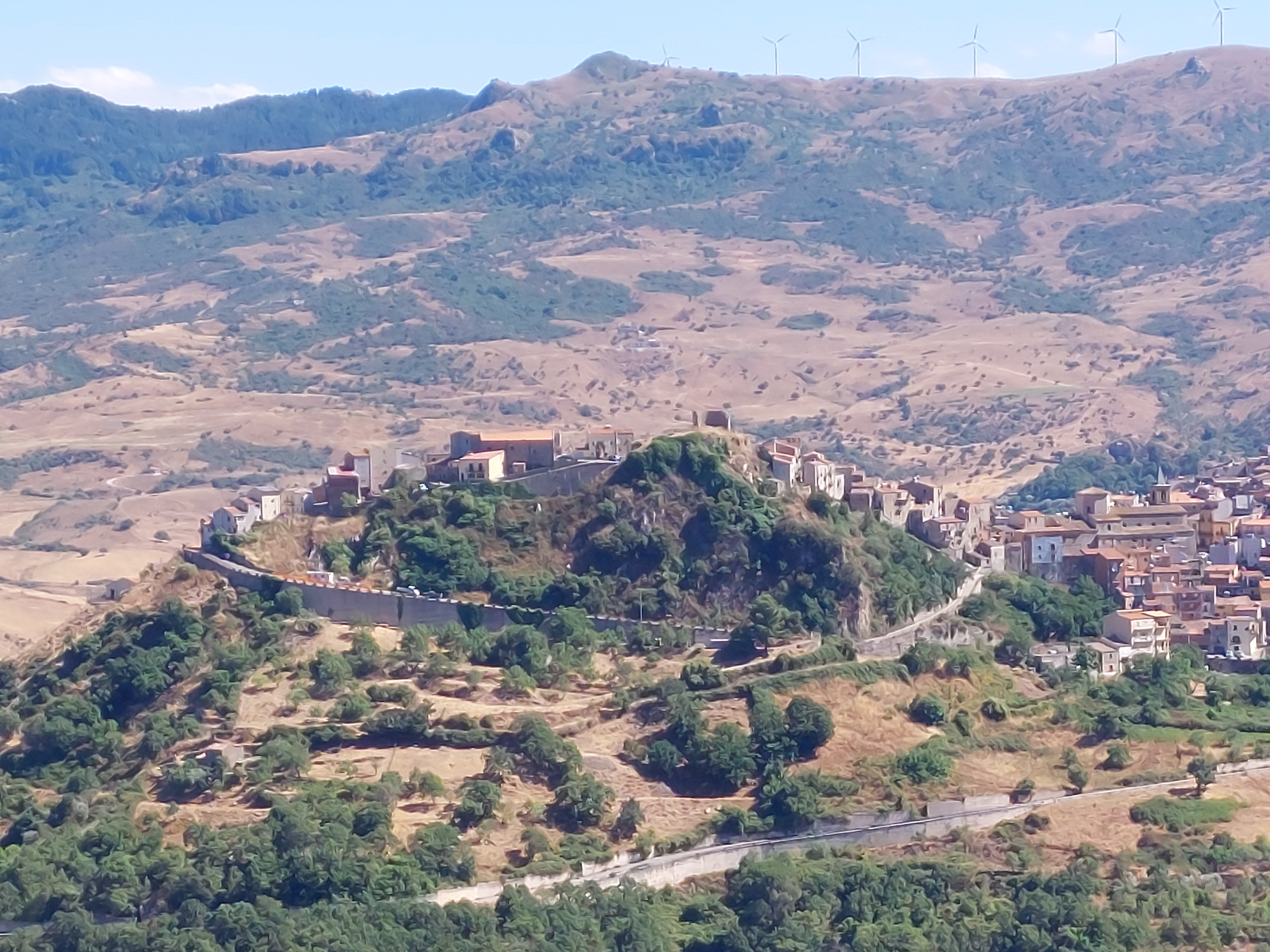
Castel di Lucio

Castel di Lucio was populated in the Norman period by families from continental Italy and southern France. The presence of Gallo-Italic dialects may suggest a Ligurian colonization, and a foundation or re-foundation by the Ligurian Ventimiglia. From 1480 to 1634 there were many lords of Castel di Lucio: Matteo Speciale, Nicola Siracusa, the Lercano, the Ansalone, the Timpanaro, the Cannizzaro, and the Agraz. In 1726 Francesco Agraz was named first Duke of Castelluzzo in a diploma of Charles IV of Sicily, thus closing the baronial era. In the 16th century there were 1617 inhabitants in 346 houses, in the seventeenth century the population increase was slight, to 1695 inhabitants and 528 houses. There were no significant changes in the eighteenth century.

In the nineteenth century, there was significant out-migration to the United States (especially Easton, Pennsylvania; New York; and Connecticut) and to Argentina (Córdoba and Buenos Aires).

== Today ==
An onshore wind farm operated by Alerion Clean Power has been generating electricity since 2010.

== Notable people ==
- Don Giuseppe Sciortino, historian, priest and author
- Don Nino Sciortino, priest and author
- (diaspora) Chuck Amato, US football coach
- (diaspora) Alfredo Felice Michele Campo (1905-1992), petroleum executive in Canada
- (diaspora) Dennis Mammana, astronomer and author
