= Palazzo Trabia =

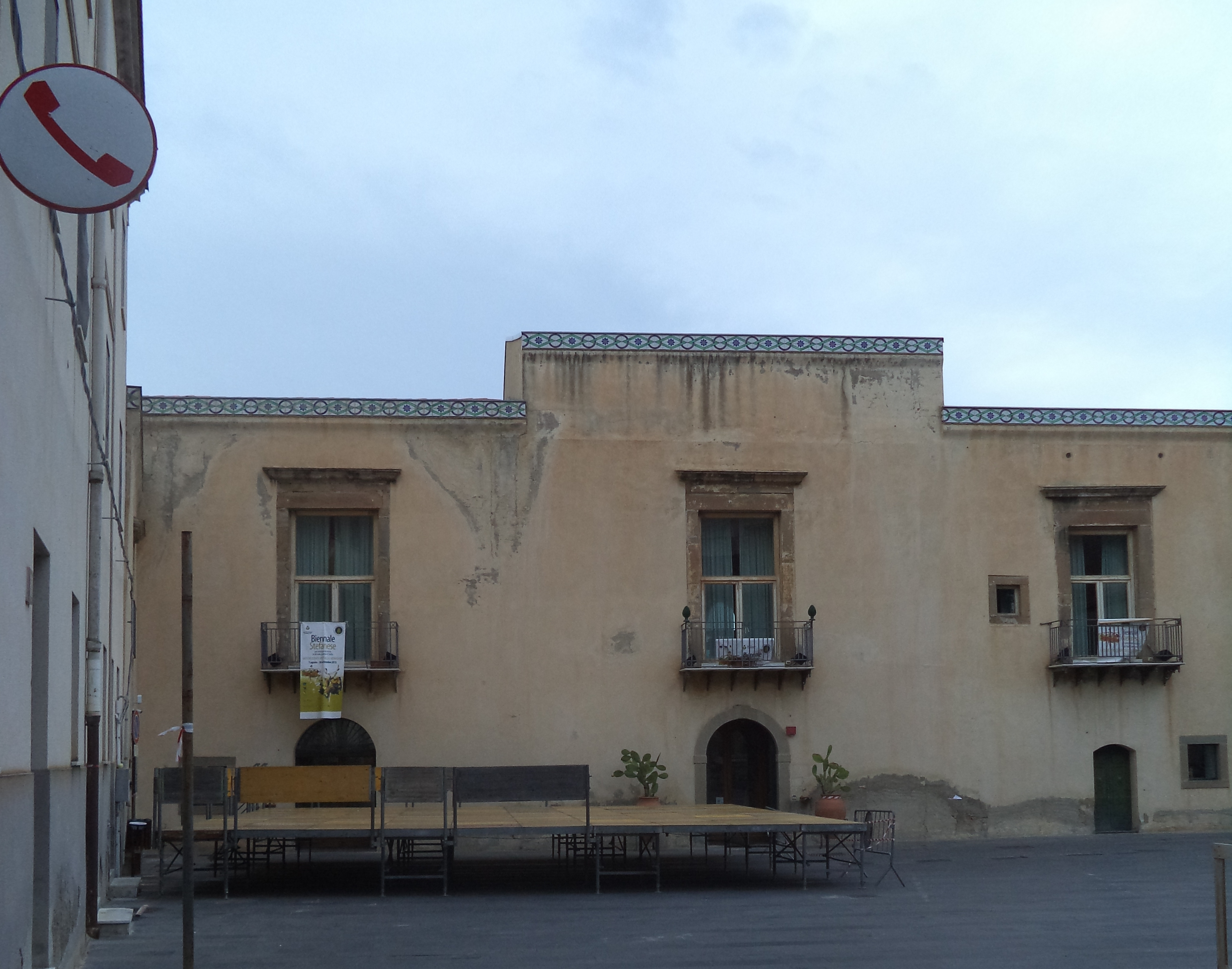
Santo Stefano di Camastra

Palazzo Trabia is a historic building in Santo Stefano di Camastra, in the province of Messina in Italy. It is currently home to the Civic Museum of Ceramics.

The palace was built by Giuseppe Lanza Barresi at the end of the 17th century. Located on a large terrace, it is about 80 meters above sea level. The building underwent a series of interventions, until it became definitive in the second half of the nineteenth century. It was acquired by the city of Santo Stefano di Camastra in 1994. The then mayor set up the museum in the palace.

The Museum preserves art ceramics of the greatest Italian ceramist masters, including Pompeo Pianezzola, Alessio Tasca, Carlo Zauli, Rocco Famularo, Filadelfio Todaro, Rosa Maria Raffaele, Giuseppe Prinzi and Federico Bonaldi.
