= Santo Stefano di Camastra =

- Comune
- Comune di Santo Stefano di Camastra
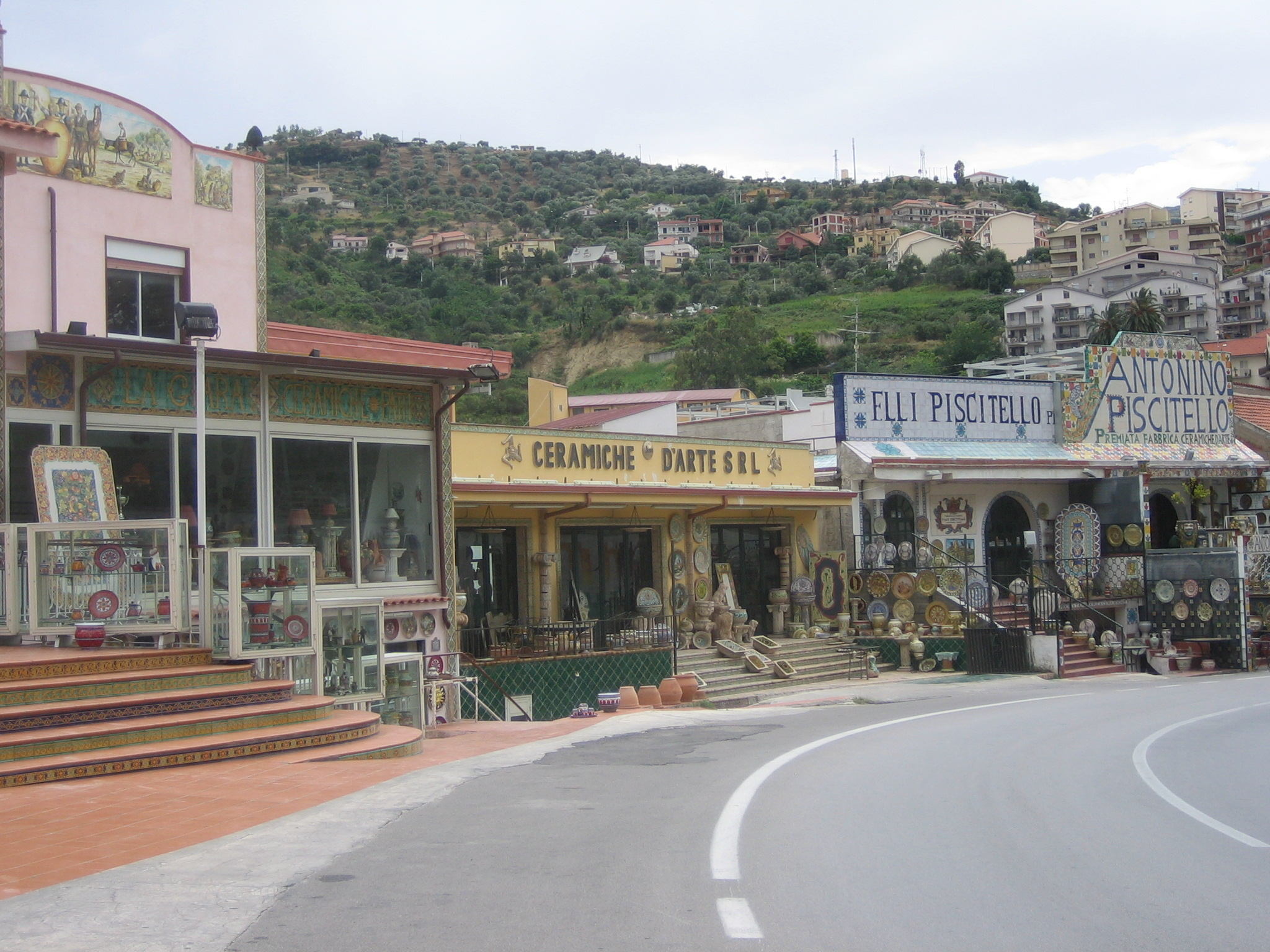

- Location within Italy Location within Sicily
- Coordinates: 38°1′N 14°21′E
- Country: Italy
- Region: Sicily
- Metropolitan city: Messina (ME)

Government
  - Mayor: Francesco Re

Area
  - Total: 21.9 km^{2} (8.5 sq mi)
- Elevation: 70 m (230 ft)

Population (31 December 2015)
  - Total: 4,694
  - Density: 214/km^{2} (555/sq mi)
- Demonym: Stefanesi
- Time zone: UTC+1 (CET)
  - Summer (DST): UTC+2 (CEST)
- Postal code: 98077
- Dialing code: 0921
- Website: Official website

Santo Stefano di Camastra (Sicilian: Santu Stèfanu di Camastra) is a comune (municipality) in the Metropolitan City of Messina in the Italian region Sicily, located about 100 km east of Palermo and about 135 km west of Messina.

Santo Stefano di Camastra borders the following municipalities: Caronia, Mistretta, Reitano.

The comune contains the Palazzo Trabia, currently the Civic Museum of Ceramics. The town, along with a few others in Sicily, is known for its ceramics painted in bright colors.
