= Tusa, Sicily =

Tusa
- Comune
- Comune di Tusa
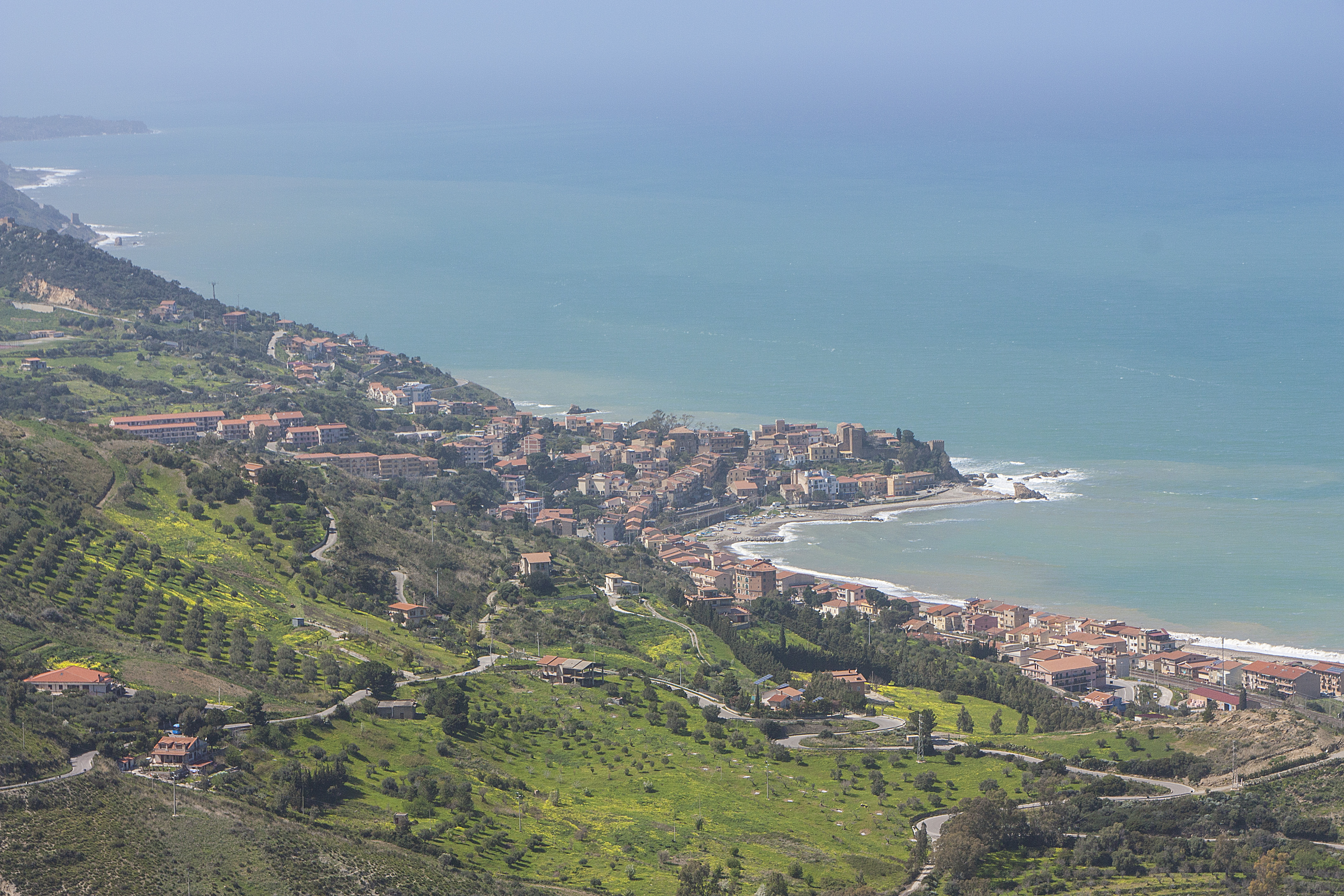
- Castel di Tusa

- Location within Italy Location within Sicily
- Coordinates: 37°59′N 14°14′E
- Country: Italy
- Region: Sicily
- Metropolitan city: Messina (ME)
- Frazioni: Castel di Tusa, Milianni

Area
  - Total: 41.07 km^{2} (15.86 sq mi)
- Elevation: 614 m (2,014 ft)

Population (2026)
  - Total: 2,480
  - Density: 60.4/km^{2} (156/sq mi)
- Time zone: UTC+1 (CET)
  - Summer (DST): UTC+2 (CEST)
- Postal code: 98079
- Dialing code: 0921

Tusa is a town and comune (municipality) in the Province of Messina in the autonomous island region of Sicily in Italy, located about 80 kilometres (50 mi) east of Palermo and about 120 kilometres (75 mi) west of Messina. It has 2,480 inhabitants.

Tusa borders the municipalities of Motta d'Affermo, Pettineo, and San Mauro Castelverde.

== Demographics ==
As of 2026, the population is 2,480, of which 50.1% are male, and 49.9% are female. Minors make up 10.6% of the population, and seniors make up 30.8%.

Historical population

Year	Pop.	±%
1861	4,100	—
1871	4,678	+14.1%
1881	4,866	+4.0%
1901	6,354	+30.6%
1911	6,930	+9.1%
1921	7,085	+2.2%
1931	5,649	−20.3%
1936	5,826	+3.1%

Year	Pop.	±%
1951	6,031	+3.5%
1961	5,308	−12.0%
1971	4,508	−15.1%
1981	3,733	−17.2%
1991	3,630	−2.8%
2001	3,358	−7.5%
2011	3,051	−9.1%
2021	2,638	−13.5%

Source: ISTAT

=== Immigration ===
As of 2025, immigrants make up 3.7% of the population. The 5 largest foreign countries of birth are Tunisia, Albania, Germany, the United States, and Argentina.
