= Canneto, Monteverdi Marittimo =

Canneto
- Frazione
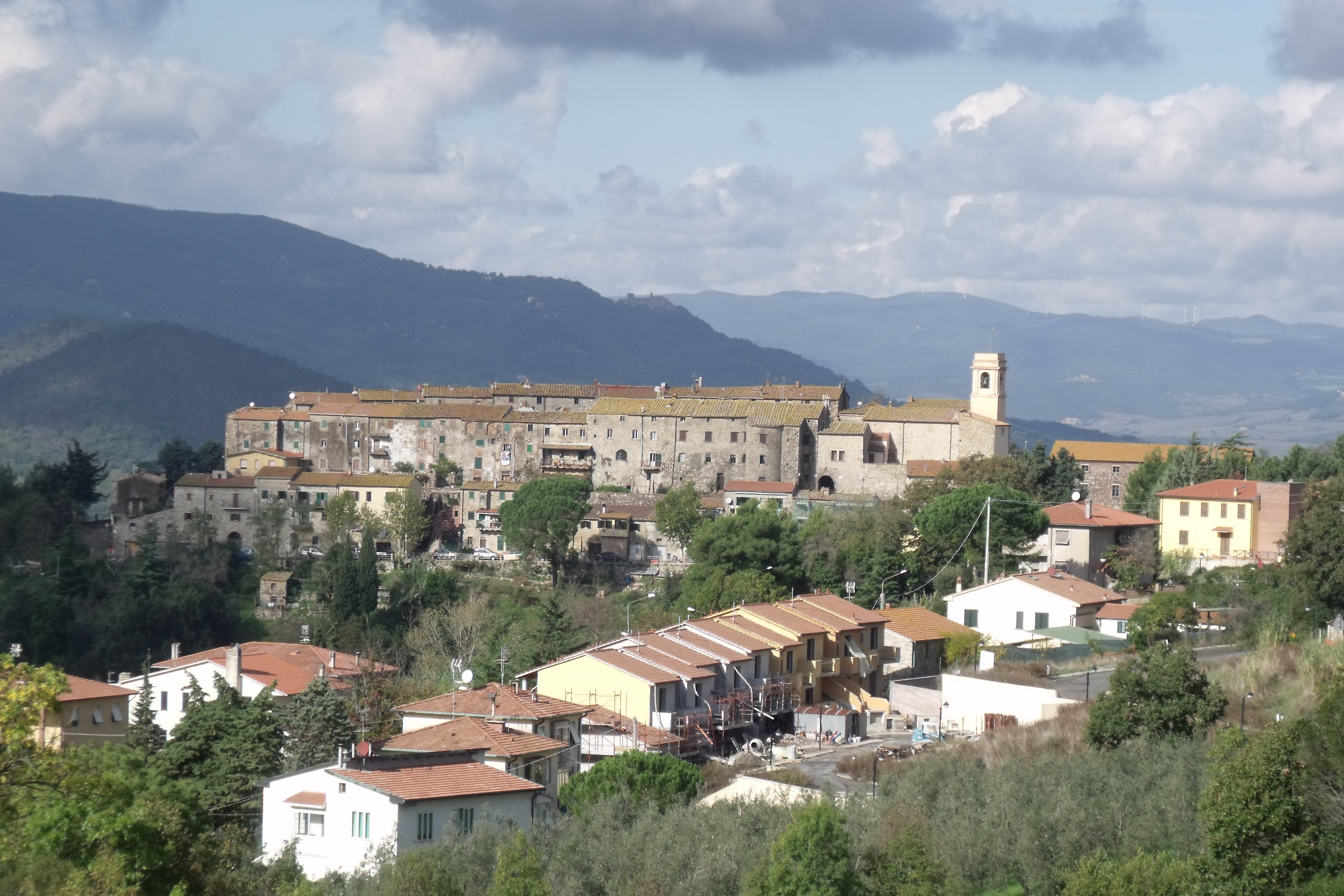

- Location of Canneto in Italy
- Coordinates: 43°11′58″N 10°44′14″E
- Country: Italy
- Region: Tuscany
- Province: Pisa (PI)
- Comune: Monteverdi Marittimo
- Elevation: 295 m (968 ft)

Population (2001)
  - Total: 182
- Demonym: Cannetani
- Time zone: UTC+1 (CET)
  - Summer (DST): UTC+2 (CEST)
- Postal code: 56040
- Dialing code: (+39) 0565

Canneto is a village in Tuscany, central Italy, administratively a frazione of the comune of Monteverdi Marittimo, province of Pisa. At the time of the 2001 census its population was 182.

Canneto is about 90 km from Pisa and 5 km from Monteverdi Marittimo.
