= Mistretta =

Mistretta Amastra
- Comune
- Comune di Mistretta
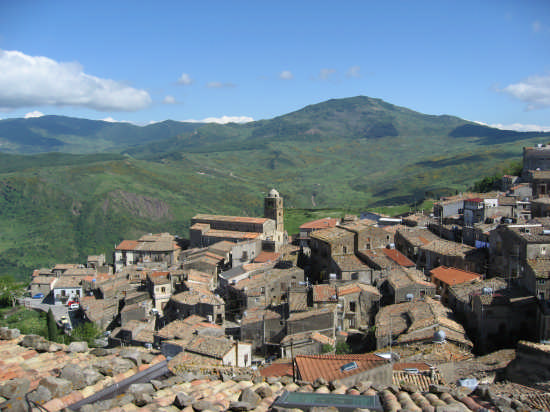

- Location within Italy Location within Sicily
- Coordinates: 37°56′N 14°22′E
- Country: Italy
- Region: Sicily
- Metropolitan city: Messina (ME)

Government
  - Mayor: Sebastiano Sanzarello

Area
  - Total: 126.8 km^{2} (49.0 sq mi)
- Elevation: 950 m (3,120 ft)

Population (30 November 2011)
  - Total: 5,014
  - Density: 39.54/km^{2} (102.4/sq mi)
- Demonym: Mistrettesi
- Time zone: UTC+1 (CET)
  - Summer (DST): UTC+2 (CEST)
- Postal code: 98073
- Dialing code: 0921
- Website: Official website

Mistretta (Sicilian: Mistritta) is a comune (municipality) in the Metropolitan City of Messina in the Italian region Sicily, located about 90 kilometres (56 mi) east of Palermo and about 110 kilometres (68 mi) west of Messina.

This may be the location of the ancient town of Amestratus (Ἀμήστρατος).

Mistretta borders the following municipalities: Capizzi, Caronia, Castel di Lucio, Cerami, Nicosia, Pettineo, Reitano, Santo Stefano di Camastra.

== People ==
- Ernesto Almirante (1877–1964)
