= Pettineo =

- Comune
- Comune di Pettineo
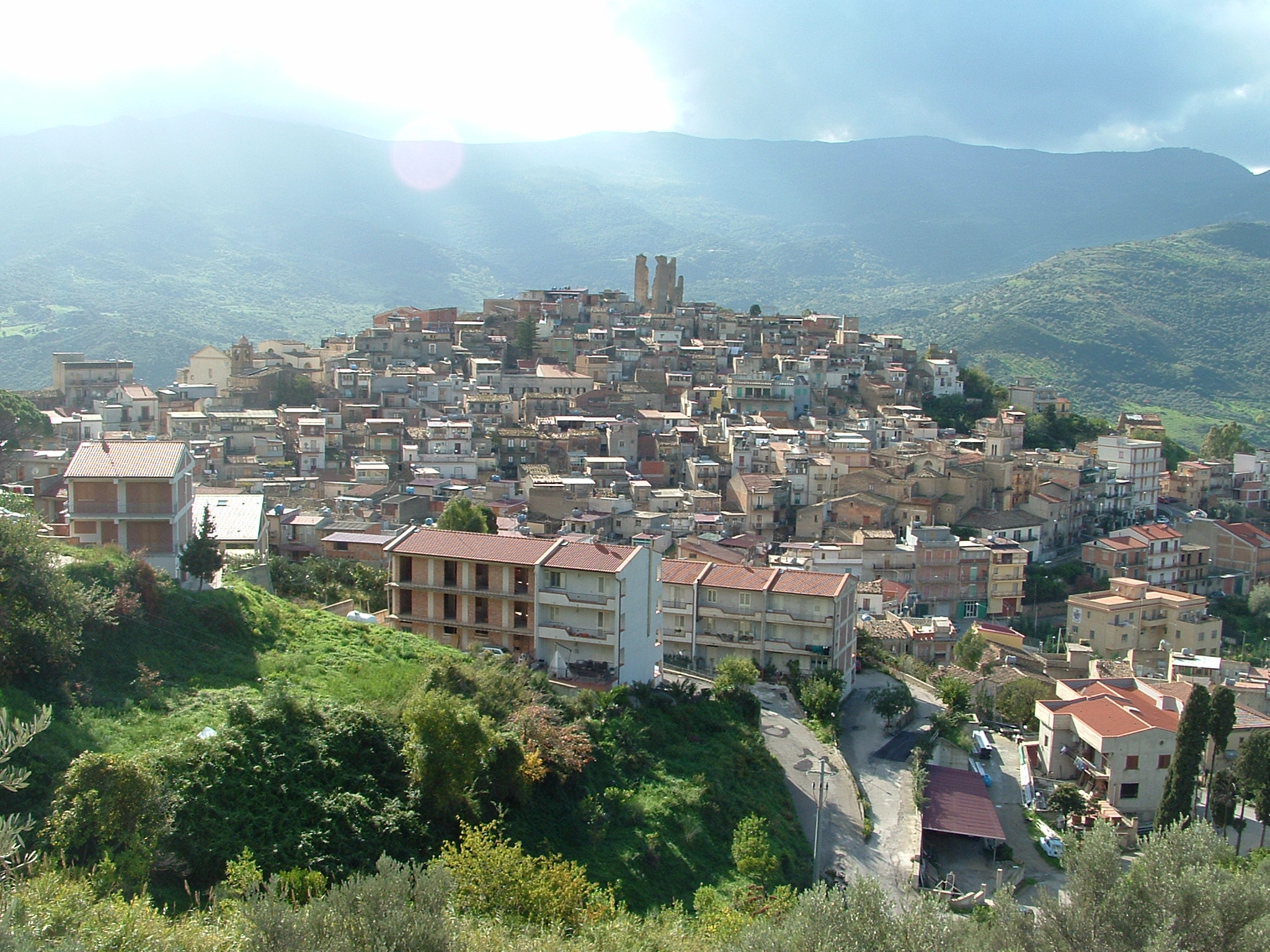

- Location within Italy Location within Sicily
- Coordinates: 37°58′N 14°17′E
- Country: Italy
- Region: Sicily
- Metropolitan city: Messina (ME)

Government
  - Mayor: Domenico Ruffino

Area
  - Total: 30.5 km^{2} (11.8 sq mi)
- Elevation: 250 m (820 ft)

Population (30 November 2011)
  - Total: 1,437
  - Density: 47.1/km^{2} (122/sq mi)
- Demonym: Pettinesi
- Time zone: UTC+1 (CET)
  - Summer (DST): UTC+2 (CEST)
- Postal code: 98070
- Dialing code: 0921
- Website: Official website

Pettineo (Sicilian: Pittineu) is a comune (municipality) in the Metropolitan City of Messina in the Italian region Sicily, located about 80 kilometres (50 mi) east of Palermo and about 110 kilometres (68 mi) west of Messina.

Pettineo is a restored medieval city, situated on a hilltop with a view of the Tyrrhenian Sea (Mar Tirreno), In the center, are the ruins of a Norman-era castle, and on the outskirts, there is a Franciscan convent. Most employment is agricultural, with fields and olive groves surrounding the town. There are notable architectural elements such as the Duomo, medieval outdoor ovens, and a public washing area. Holy Week is marked with colorful processions on Good Friday and on Pascha, with the entire community engaged. Roads are cobbled and narrow, and generally devoid of vehicular traffic. Among area attractions are the valley of Tusa with monumental sculptures commemorating the landing of Allied paratroopers, during World War II.

Pettineo borders the following municipalities: Castel di Lucio, Mistretta, Motta d'Affermo, Reitano, San Mauro Castelverde, Tusa.
