= Capo d'Orlando =

Capo d'Orlando Capu d'Orlannu (Sicilian)
- Comune
- Comune di Capo d'Orlando
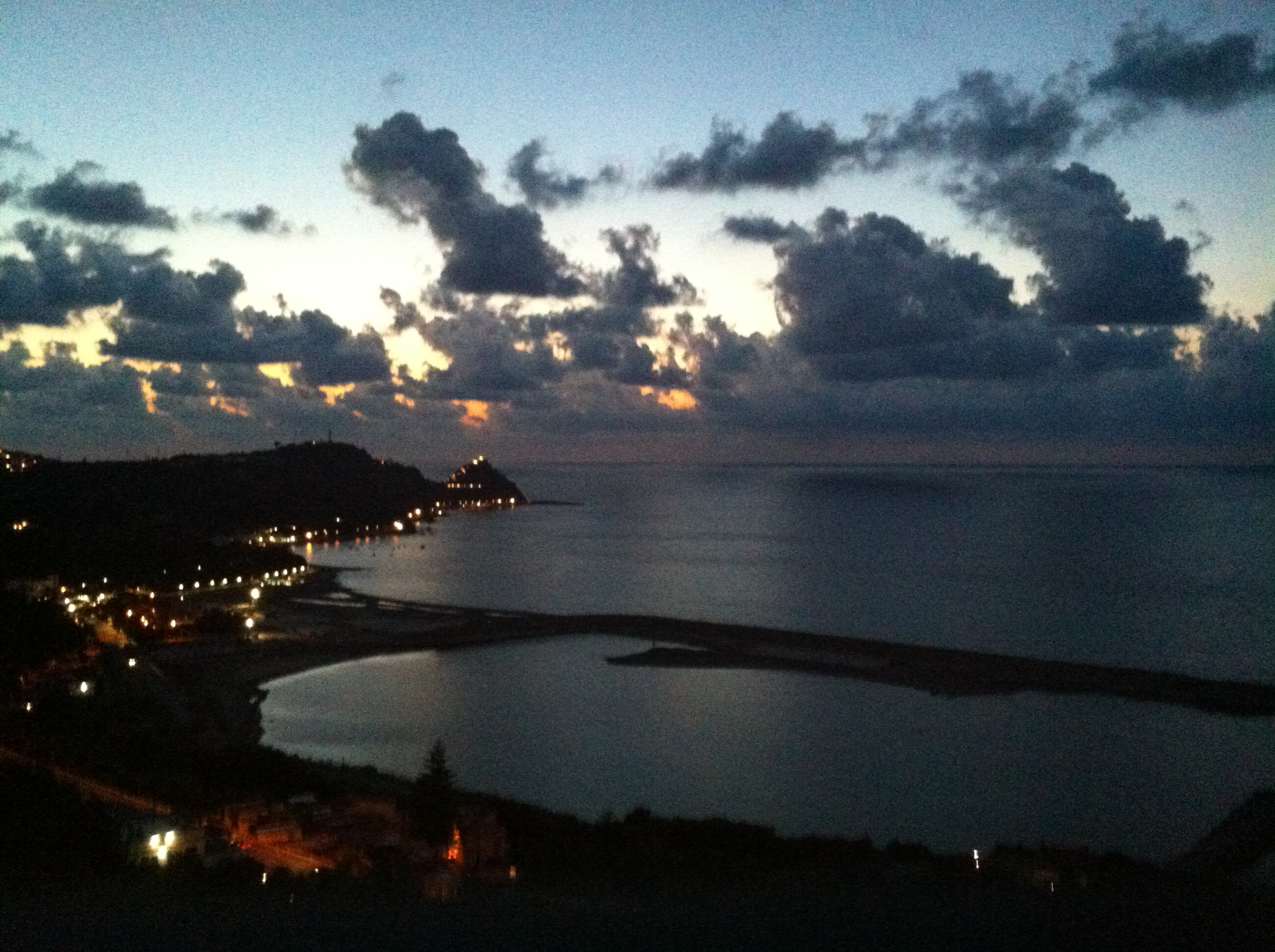
- View over Capo d'Orlando

- Location within Italy Location within Sicily
- Coordinates: 38°09′N 14°44′E
- Country: Italy
- Region: Sicily
- Metropolitan city: Messina (ME)

Government
  - Mayor: Franco Ingrillì

Area
  - Total: 14 km^{2} (5.4 sq mi)
- Elevation: 2 m (6.6 ft)

Population (31 March 2018)
  - Total: 13,256
  - Density: 950/km^{2} (2,500/sq mi)
- Demonym: Orlandini
- Time zone: UTC+1 (CET)
  - Summer (DST): UTC+2 (CEST)
- Postal code: 98070 and 98071
- Dialing code: 0941
- Patron saint: Maria SS. di Porto Salvo
- Saint day: October 22
- Website: Official website

Capo d'Orlando (Sicilian: Capu d'Orlannu) is a comune in the Metropolitan City of Messina, Sicily, southern Italy, one of the main centers of the mountainous and coastal Nebrodi area.

== Physical geography ==
=== Territory ===
A large part of the town is mainly located on a narrow plain, enclosed between the sea and a hill range which extends parallel to it. Here, various frazioni are located: San Martino (the most populated), Scafa, Piscittina, Forno Alto, Catutè, Certari e Malvicino, all are located at between 50 and 300m of altitude. On the western side, the frazioni of Forno Medio, Trazzera Marina, Piana, Furriolo, Bruca, Vina, Masseria, San Giuseppe and Tavola Grande are located. On the eastern coastline we can find the village of San Gregorio (Borgo di San Gregorio), in addition to the seaside area called Testa di Monaco, bordering the comune of Naso.

=== Climate ===
The climate in Capo D'Orlando is Mediterranean subtropical, with warmer, rainy and short winters, and hot and muggy (but usually also windy) summers. Climatic conditions, moreover, allow cultivation of subtropical plants (both ornamental and fruit plants) on the entire territory of the comune. According to the Köppen climate classification, the city is part of the Csa climate zone.

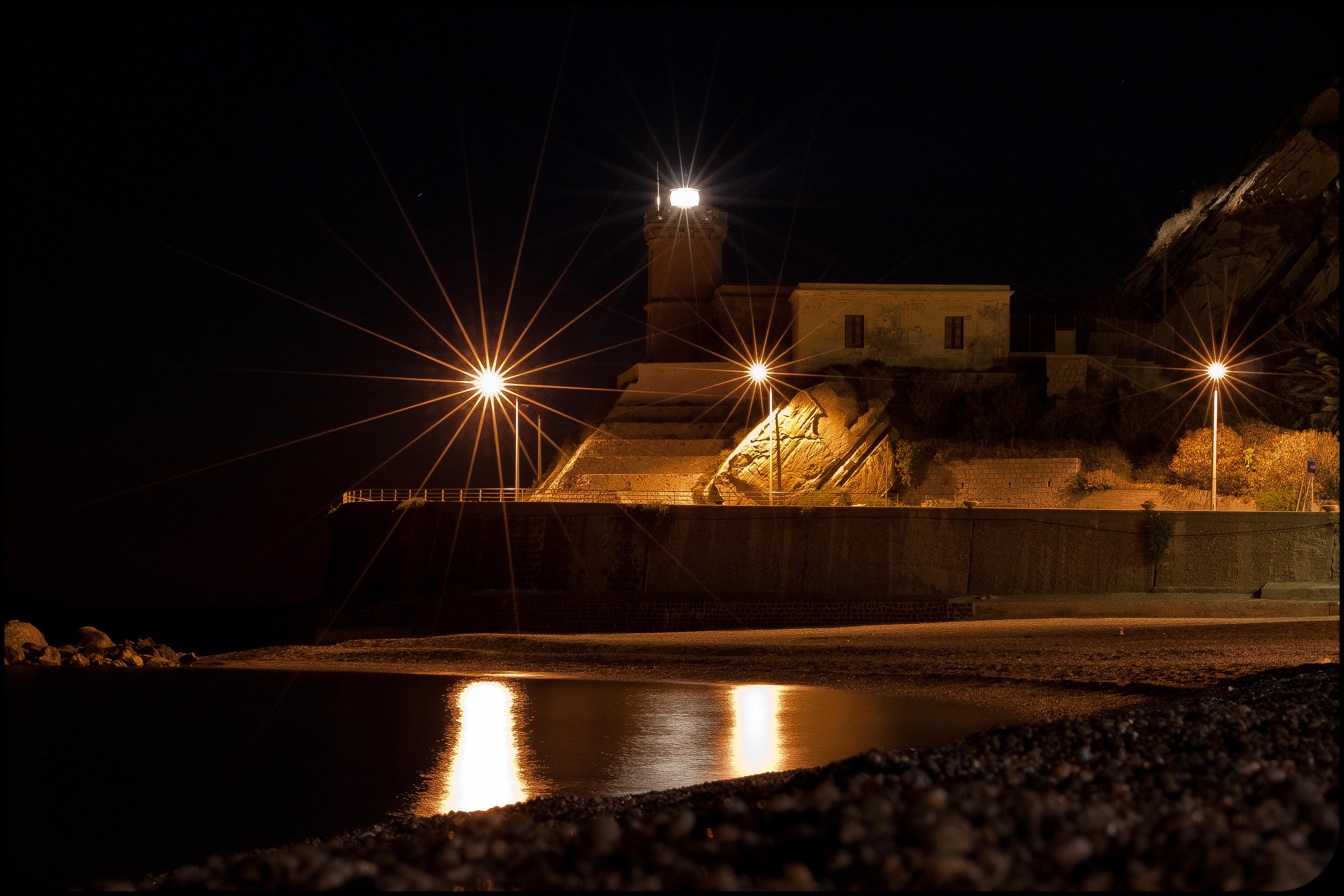
The lighthouse of Capo d'Orlando by night

== History ==
After the destruction of the Greek colony of Agathyrnum by the Roman Republican Army, the only settlement was a tiny fisherman's village. In 1925 Capo d'Orlando was elevated to the status of Comune (council), as before it was included in the territory of Naso.

A railway station was made during the Fascist era in the early 20th century. During this century the population and tourist development quickly grew.

Modern and contemporary history

In the following centuries, notably in the 18th and at the beginning of the 19th century, there had been years characterized for their long and dangerous floodings, which pushed the d'Amico counts to pass the possession to the comune of Naso. Floodings made yet a new opportunity for Capo d'Orlando: a very fertile plain was formed because of the sea activity, and the textile industry (that was already active since the 15th century in contrada Malvicino, together with sugar cane cultivation) was experiencing a period of development. So, Capo d'Orlando combined the cultivations with the fishermen's activity, and to protect the center from pirates' raids and to exploit the new resources, barons of Naso built a new fortified tower and a crushing site for the production of sugar.

In the same period, in the San Gregorio zone an almadraba was built, and so, Capo d'Orlando, specifically San Gregorio maritime village, which was the real heart of the town until the end of the 19th century, reached a strong economic independence, and its population started to grow, this happened also thanks to the finishing of the railway that passed through the center and the strade statali (state roads) 113 Messina-Palermo and 116 Capo d'Orlando-Randazzo. Between the beginning of the 19th century and the beginning of the 20th century the tumults to get the autonomy from Naso started. Naso by then had the same economic and demographic relevance as the frazione and in order to keep the sea outpost, it gave pieces of territory to Capo d'Orlando. Nevertheless, the tumults still went on until thanks to Legge n. 1170 of 25 June 1925, Capo d'Orlando got its autonomy that started on 1 August, and that was sealed on 27 September of the same year.

== Economy ==
Tourism is one of the main resources of the local economy. The town also has a small marina for both fishing and tourist boats alike that also offers transportation to and from the Aeolian islands during the summer season and approximately 14 km of beaches, rocky shores that face the deep blue Tyrrenian sea, making it an ideal spot to enjoy the summertime, early fall and late springtime. The location of Capo d'Orlando is also very peculiar because for a town that faces the sea, it is also very close (less than 20 km) to Nebrodi Mountain Regional Environmental Park: a large extension of temperate woods, where is possible to hike to lakes, rivers, falls and tiny historical villages where everyone can enjoy the best of traditional Sicilian food and wine.

There are banks and commercial business firms along with several fair-sized factories located nearby such as "Porte IMIC" (wooden and metal door manufacturer), "irritec" and "siplast" (irrigation systems).

Another economic factor is exploitation of the extensive presence of orange and lemon fields throughout the area.

== Sport ==
Capo d'Orlando is home to a second division basketball team, Orlandina Basket.

== Twin towns ==
- Culver City, United States
- Conversano, Italy
- Fremantle, Australia

== People ==
- Calogero Paparoni (1876-1958) - coffee trader migrated to Venezuela
- Giuseppina Paterniti (born 1956) - RAI journalist
- Lucio Piccolo (1901-1969) - poet
- Filippo Sindoni (1933- 2006) - entrepreneur migrated to Venezuela
- Vittorio Sindoni (born 1939) - film director and screenwriter

== See also ==
- Capo d'Orlando Lighthouse
- Villa Romana Bagnoli
