= Reitano =

- Comune
- Comune di Reitano
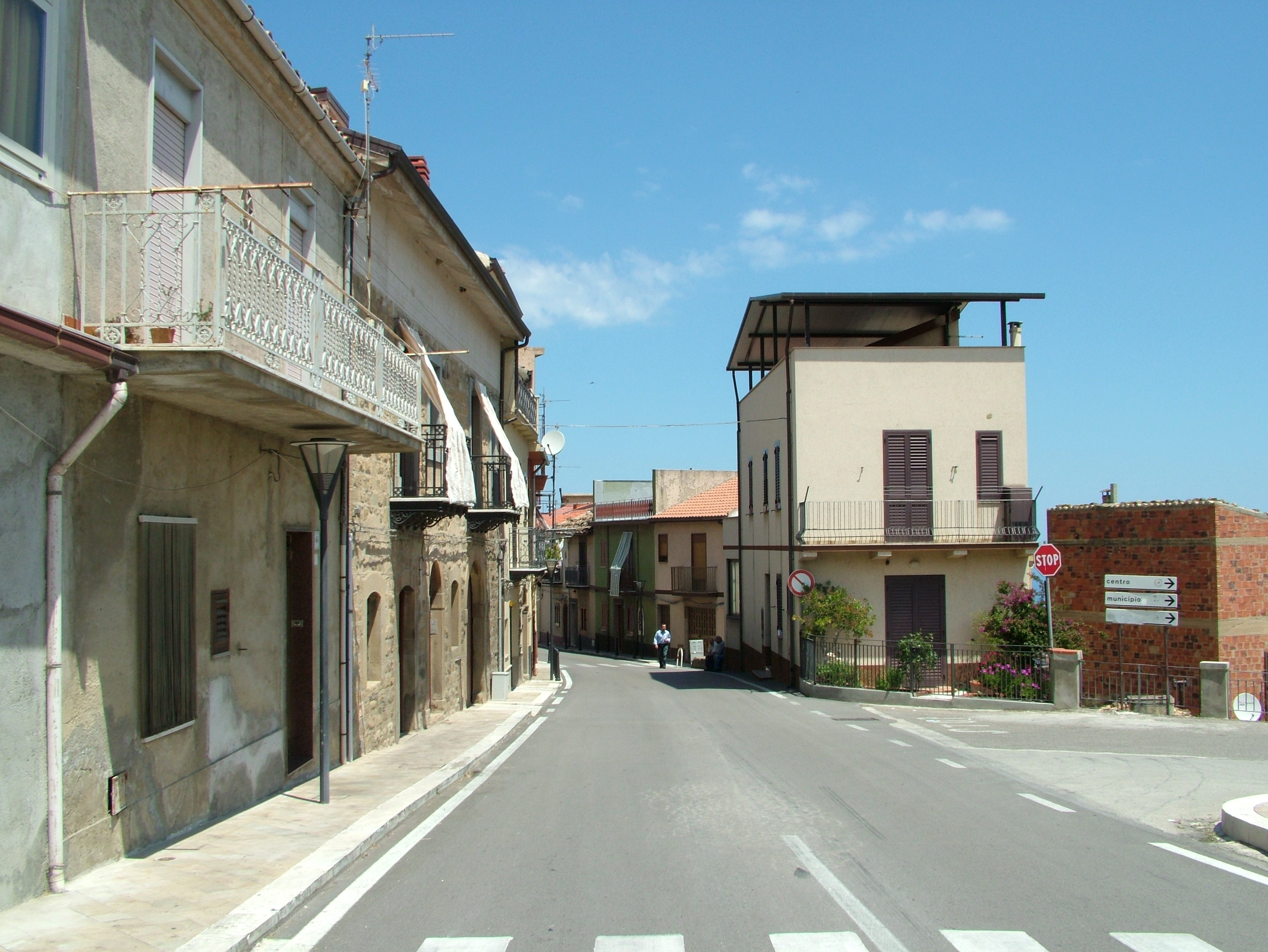
- Reitano

- Location within Italy Location within Sicily
- Coordinates: 37°58′N 14°21′E
- Country: Italy
- Region: Sicily
- Metropolitan city: Messina (ME)
- Frazioni: Villa Margi

Government
  - Mayor: Salvatore Villardita

Area
  - Total: 13.9 km^{2} (5.4 sq mi)
- Elevation: 396 m (1,299 ft)

Population (31 December 2015)
  - Total: 806
  - Density: 58.0/km^{2} (150/sq mi)
- Demonym: Reitanesi
- Time zone: UTC+1 (CET)
  - Summer (DST): UTC+2 (CEST)
- Postal code: 98070
- Dialing code: 0821
- Website: Official website

Reitano (Sicilian: Ritanu) is a comune (municipality) in the Metropolitan City of Messina in the Italian region of Sicily, about 90 kilometres (56 mi) east of Palermo and about 110 kilometres (68 mi) west of Messina.

Reitano borders the following municipalities: Mistretta, Motta d'Affermo, Pettineo, Santo Stefano di Camastra.
