= Caronia =

Caronia Καλάκτα/Kalàkta
- Comune
- Comune di Caronia
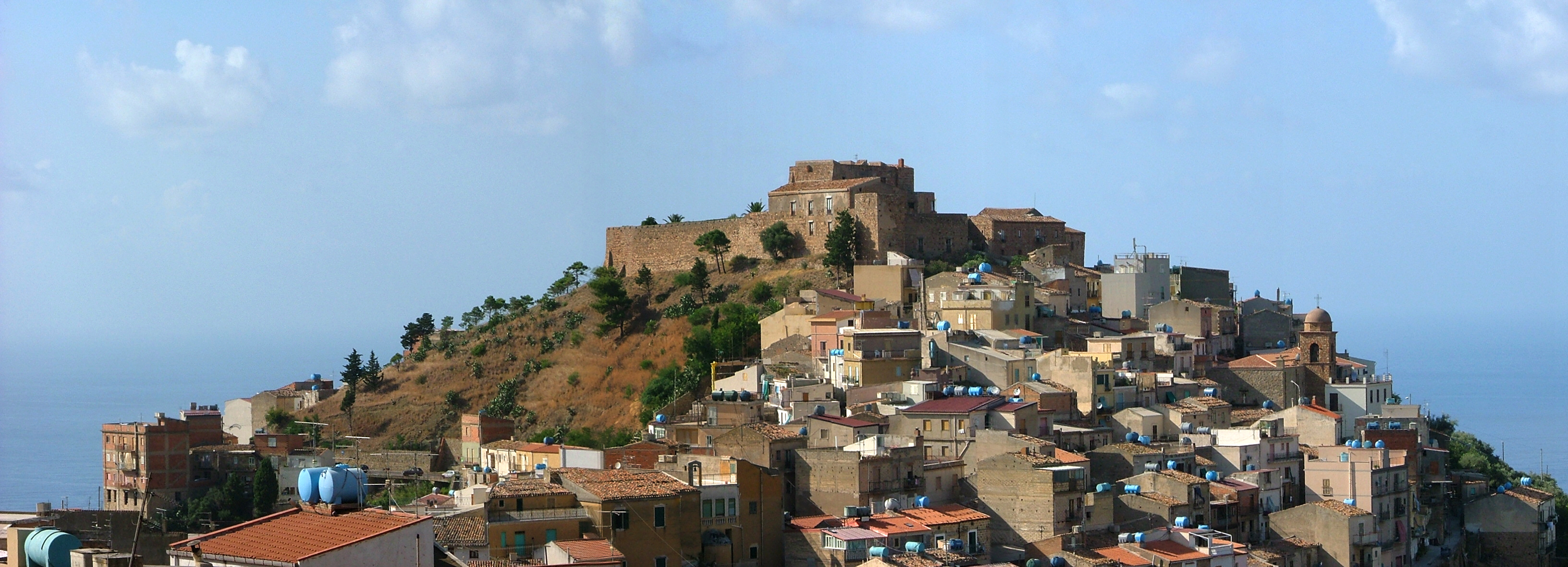

- Coat of arms

- Location within Italy Location within Sicily
- Coordinates: 38°01′N 14°26′E
- Country: Italy
- Region: Sicily
- Metropolitan city: Messina (ME)
- Frazioni: Canneto, Marina, Torre del Lauro

Government
  - Mayor: Giuseppe Cuffari

Area
  - Total: 226 km^{2} (87 sq mi)
- Elevation: 304 m (997 ft)

Population (30 April 2012)
  - Total: 3,414
  - Density: 15.1/km^{2} (39.1/sq mi)
- Demonym: Caronesi
- Time zone: UTC+1 (CET)
  - Summer (DST): UTC+2 (CEST)
- Postal code: 98072
- Dialing code: 0921
- Patron saint: Saint Blaise
- Saint day: February 3
- Website: Official website

Caronia (Sicilian: Carunìa, Greek: Καλάκτα (Ptol.) or Καλὴ Ἀκτὴ (Diod. et al.), Latin: Calacte or Cale Acte) is a town and comune on the north coast of Sicily, in the Metropolitan City of Messina, about halfway between Tyndaris (modern Tindari) and Cephaloedium (modern Cefalù). The town has 3,555 inhabitants.

== History ==
Kale Akte (or Caleacte, Calacta, Calacte) derived its name from the beauty of the neighboring country; the whole of this strip of coast between the Montes Heraei and the sea being called by the Greek settlers of Magna Graecia from an early period, the Fair Shore (ἡ καλὴ Ἀκτή – he Kale Akte). Its beauty and fertility had attracted the particular attention of the Zanclaeans, who in consequence invited the Samians and Milesians (after the capture of Miletus by the Persians, 494 BC) to establish themselves on this part of the Sicilian coast. Events, however, turned their attention elsewhere, and they ended with occupying Zancle itself. At a later period the project was resumed by the Sikel leader Ducetius, who, after his expulsion from Sicily by Syracuse and his exile at Corinth, returned at the head of a body of colonists from the Peloponnese; and having obtained much support from the neighbouring Siculi, especially from Archonides, dynast of Herbita, according to Diodorus Siculus founded a city on the coast, which was called Kalè Akté (The Fair Shore or Beautiful Coast). The date given by Diodorus is 446 BC, but in another passus the same author says that Ducetius colonised Kale Akte in 440 BC, the same year he died. In addition, recent excavations at Caronia, which is clearly the site of the Hellenistic and Roman town Kale Akte, have revealed only very sparse remains from the 5th century BC, and show that a Sikel settlement already existed here in the early 5th century BC. It is possible that Ducetius founded the colony on the site of this already existing Sikel settlement, just as he had done at Menai and Paliké.

Some scholars have hypothesised that Ducetius returned without the consent of Syracuse, but this is very improbable. He must have had the permission of Syracuse to end the exile at Corinth (the mother city of Syracuse), and he brought according to Diodorus partly Corinthian settlers for the colonising project at Kale Akte. Syracuse would have had an interest of establishing an allied Sikel-Greek colony on the north coast, without risking too much in a potentially hostile Sikel-dominated area.

There are little subsequent account of its fortunes. It appears to have been in Cicero's time a considerable municipal town. Silius Italicus speaks of it as abounding in fish, litus piscosa Calacte and its name, though omitted by Pliny, is found in Ptolemy, as well as in the Antonine Itineraries; but there is considerable difficulty in regard to its position. The distances given in the Tabula Peutingeriana, however (12 M. P. from Alaesa, and 30 M. P. from Cephaloedium), coincide with the site of the modern town of Caronia, on the shore below which Fazello tells us that ruins and vestiges of an ancient city were still visible in his time. Cluverius, who visited Caronia, speaks with admiration of the beauty and pleasantness of this part of the coast, littoris excellens amoenitas et pulchritudo, which rendered it fully worthy of its ancient name.

The Greek rhetorician Caecilius of Caleacte, who flourished in the time of Augustus, was a native of Caleacte, whence he derived the surname of Calactinus.

In 2003–2004 and 2014, two series of unusual fires were reported in the village of Canneto, 136 kilometres (85 mi) west of Messina. Officials determined that these fires were cases of arson and arrests were made in 2015. From December 2003 to August 2004, various items including a television, a cooker, and a vacuum cleaner, wedding presents, a chair, and an unplugged electrical cable were claimed to have ignited spontaneously, prompting some members of the public to ascribe supernatural causes. The outbreaks reportedly continued after ENEL, the Italian power utility, cut off the town's power supply. In 2008, investigators suspected that the 2003–2004 fires were caused by arson, Mysterious fires again occurred in mid-2014. and on 5 March 2015, police arrested and charged Giuseppe Pezzino, 26, with arson, conspiracy to commit fraud, and sounding a false alarm in association with the mysterious fires. His father, Antonino Pezzino, has also been implicated. The Italian military police had installed hidden cameras in the streets after the fires started again (July 2014). Video captured about 40 incidents implicating Giuseppe, and occasionally, Antonino. Further evidence was gathered by phone taps.

== Climate ==
The climate is Hot Summer Mediterranean. The station’s elevation is 302 meters above sea level.

Climate data for Caronia (1985-2015)
| Month | Jan | Feb | Mar | Apr | May | Jun | Jul | Aug | Sep | Oct | Nov | Dec | Year |
|---|---|---|---|---|---|---|---|---|---|---|---|---|---|
| Mean daily maximum °C (°F) | 15.8 (60.4) | 16.1 (61.0) | 17.9 (64.2) | 20.8 (69.4) | 25.1 (77.2) | 28.8 (83.8) | 31.9 (89.4) | 32.5 (90.5) | 28.9 (84.0) | 25.7 (78.3) | 21.4 (70.5) | 17.0 (62.6) | 24.3 (75.7) |
| Mean daily minimum °C (°F) | 8.9 (48.0) | 8.6 (47.5) | 9.6 (49.3) | 12.0 (53.6) | 15.4 (59.7) | 18.8 (65.8) | 21.8 (71.2) | 21.9 (71.4) | 19.7 (67.5) | 16.7 (62.1) | 13.2 (55.8) | 10.3 (50.5) | 13.1 (55.6) |
Source: Source
