= Santa Maria del Carmine =

Santa Maria del Carmine (Italian for Our Lady of Mount Carmel) is the name of several churches in Italy:

- Pontifical basilica of Santa Maria del Carmine, Avigliano
- Carmine Church, Carrara
- Santa Maria del Carmine, Civita Castellana
- Santa Maria del Carmine, Faenza
- Santa Maria del Carmine, Florence
- Chiesa del Carmine, Floridia
- Madonna del Carmine, Marsico Nuovo
- Chiesa del Carmine, Messina
- Santa Maria del Carmine, Milan
- Chiesa del Carmine, Modica
- Santa Maria del Carmine, Naples
- Chiesa del Carmine, Nicosia, Sicily
- Basilica del Carmine, Padua
- Santa Maria del Carmine, Pavia
- Santa Maria del Carmine, Pisa
- Santa Maria del Carmine, Pistoia
- Sanctuary of the Madonna del Carmine, Riccia
- Santa Maria del Carmine alle Tre Cannelle, in Rome
- Beata Vergine del Carmine e San Rocco, Soragna
- Carmini Church, in Venice

== See also ==
- Our Lady of Mount Carmel (disambiguation)
- Our Lady of Mount Carmel Church (disambiguation)
- Our Lady of Mount Carmel Cathedral (disambiguation)
- Carmine Church (disambiguation)
