= Our Lady of Mount Carmel Church =

Churches dedicated to Our Lady of Mount Carmel include the following:

== Brazil ==
- Church of Our Lady of Mount Carmel, Belém, Pará
- Church of Our Lady of Mount Carmel, Ouro Preto, Minas Gerais

== Chile ==
- Our Lady of Mount Carmel Cathedral, Puerto Montt
- Military Cathedral of Our Lady of Mount Carmel, Santiago

== China ==
- Church of Our Lady of Mount Carmel, Beijing

== Columbia ==
- Our Lady of Mount Carmel Cathedral, La Dorada

== Hong Kong ==
- Our Lady of Mount Carmel Church (Hong Kong), Wan Chai, Victoria City

== India ==
- Church of Our Lady of Mount Carmel, Bandra, Mumbai
- Our Lady of Mount Carmel Church, B Pallipatti, Tamil Nadu
- Our Lady of Mount Carmel Church, Nellimarathupatti, Tamil Nadu
- Our Lady of Mount Carmel Church, Thenkaraikottai, Tamil Nadu

== Ireland ==
- Church of Our Lady of Mount Carmel, or Whitefriar Street Carmelite Church, Dublin

== Italy ==
- Santa Maria del Carmine, several churches with that name

== Malta ==
- Carmelite Church, Balluta
- Our Lady of Mount Carmel Parish Church, Fgura
- Parish Church of Our Lady of Mount Carmel, Fleur-de-Lys
- Carmelite Parish Church, Gżira
- Basilica of Our Lady of Mount Carmel, Valletta

== Peru ==
- Church of Our Lady of Mount Carmel, Lima

== Philippines ==
- Basilica of the National Shrine of Our Lady of Mount Carmel
- Our Lady of Mount Carmel Parish Church (Pulong Buhangin)

== Russia ==
- Our Lady of Mount Carmel Church, Gatchina

== Spain ==
- Shrine of Our Lady of Mount Carmel (Los Realejos)

== United Kingdom ==
- Our Lady of Mount Carmel Roman Catholic Church, Liverpool, England
- Our Lady of Mount Carmel and St Patrick Church, Oldham, England
- Our Lady of Mount Carmel Church, Redditch, England
- Church of Our Lady of Mount Carmel, Lampeter, Wales

== United States ==
- St. Mary's Church-Our Lady of Mount Carmel Catholic Church, Temple, Arizona
- Our Lady of Mount Carmel Church (Denver, Colorado), on the National Register of Historic Places listings in west Denver
- Our Lady of Mount Carmel Church (Chicago)
- Our Lady of Mount Carmel Church (East Boston, Massachusetts)
- St. Mary, Our Lady of Mount Carmel Cathedral (Gaylord, Michigan)
- Our Lady of Mount Carmel Church, in the Our Lady of the Scapular Parish in Wyandotte, Michigan
- Our Lady of Mount Carmel Church (Bronx)
- Church of Our Lady of Mount Carmel (Manhattan)
- Church of Our Lady of the Scapular of Mount Carmel, Manhattan
- Shrine Church of Our Lady of Mount Carmel; a church in the Roman Catholic Diocese of Brooklyn
- Our Lady of Mount Carmel's Church (Poughkeepsie, New York)
- Our Lady of Mt. Carmel (Bayonne, New Jersey)
- Basilica of Our Lady of Mount Carmel (Youngstown, Ohio)
- Basilica of the National Shrine of the Little Flower, San Antonio, Texas
- Our Lady of Mount Carmel Cathedral (Northern Mariana Islands), in Chalan Kanoa
- Our Lady of Mount Carmel Church, Arroyo, Puerto Rico
- Our Lady of Mount Carmel Church, Cruz Bay, Virgin Islands

== Uruguay ==
- Nuestra Señora del Carmen, Aguada, Montevideo
- Nuestra Señora del Carmen, Cordón, Montevideo
- Virgen del Carmen y Santa Teresita, Montevideo

== Venezuela ==
- Our Lady of Mount Carmel Cathedral, Guasdualito

== See also ==
- Our Lady of Mount Carmel Cathedral (disambiguation)
- Our Lady of Mount Carmel (disambiguation)
- Santa Maria del Carmine (disambiguation)
- Carmine Church (disambiguation)
- Church of Our Lady (disambiguation)
- Our Lady of Mount Carmel Grotto, Staten Island, New York
