= Madonna del Carmine (disambiguation) =

Madonna del Carmine may refer to:

- Madonna del Carmine, title given to the Blessed Virgin Mary in her role as patroness of the Carmelite Order
- Madonna del Carmine, Marsico Nuovo, a Roman Catholic church located of Marsico Nuovo, Italy
- Sanctuary of the Madonna del Carmine, Riccia, a Roman Catholic church of Riccia, Italy
- Santuario della Madonna del Carmine, Catania,

== See also ==
- Madonna del Carmelo (disambiguation)
- Santa Maria del Carmine (disambiguation)
