= Pozzo del Leoncino, Pistoia =

Coordinates: 43.932808°N 10.916483°E

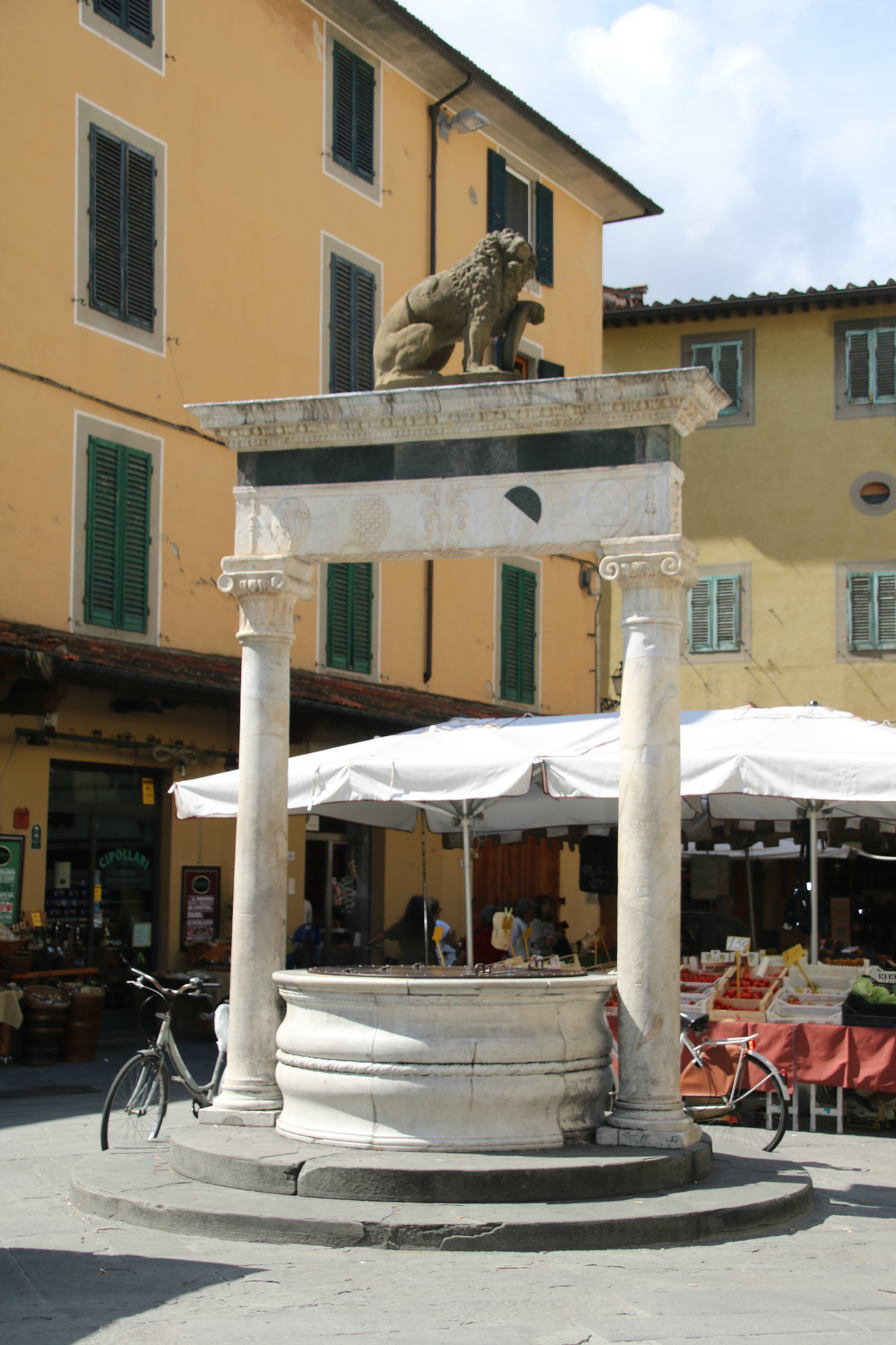
View of the Pozzo del Leoncino

The Pozzo del Leoncino (Well of the Small Lion) is 15th-16th century well located in Piazza della Sala in central Pistoia, region of Tuscany, Italy.

== History and description ==
It is suspected that this part of town formed part of the ancient forum of the Roman town of Pistoia, but was likely devastated during the Barbarian invasions. Around this piazza were built administrative buildings for the Lombard Kingdom. Nothing remains of those early medieval structures. With the elaboration of the City Hall and bureaucratic offices at the Palazzo degli Anziani in the Piazza del Duomo, this area became a marketplace and site of commerce. The surrounding streets and alleys recall different professions clustering around the piazza. Documents indicated that in the mid-15th century, the commune banned the slaughter of animals in the Piazza, which appeared to have led to the refuse contaminating the well water. The square Renaissance-style arch was designed by Cecchino di Giorgio in 1453. It is decorated with the coats of arms of the Capponi, Ridolfi, Da Diaccetto families, and the emblems of the Operai di San Jacopo, a major public works office. In 1529, atop the architrave, was placed a small lion (thus the name of the well) holding the checkered symbol of Pistoia under its paws. The use of lion, representing the Florentine Marzocco may have been part of an assertion of the Florentine rule over the town, since typically the shield of Pistoia had been upheld by a bear(s).

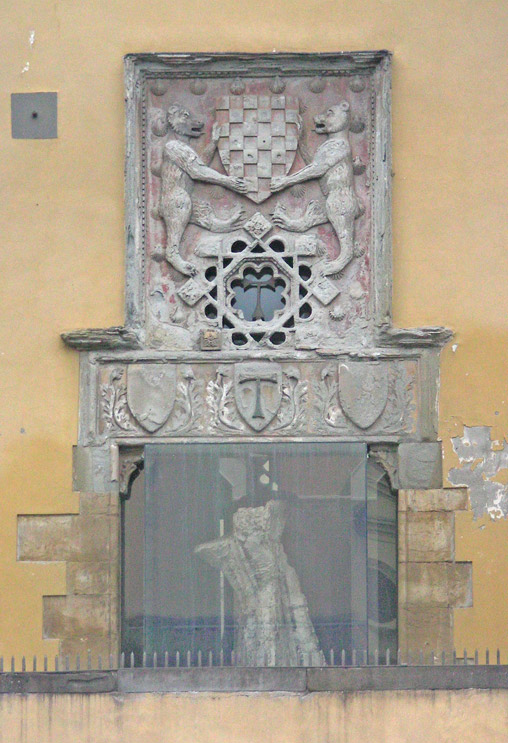
Entrance to Chiesa del Tau Monastery with bears holding symbol of Pistoia on lintel
