= Madonna del Carmelo =

Madonna del Carmelo may refer to:

- Our Lady of Mount Carmel, a title given to the Blessed Virgin Mary in her role as patroness of the Carmelite Order
- Madonna del Carmelo, Regalbuto, a church in Regalbuto, Italy

== See also ==
- Madonna del Carmine (disambiguation)
