= Our Lady of Mount Carmel Cathedral =

Our Lady of Mount Carmel Cathedral or Cathedral of Our Lady of Carmel may refer to:

Argentina

- Our Lady of Carmel Cathedral, Formosa

Brazil

- Our Lady of Carmel Cathedral, Jaboticabal

Costa Rica

- Our Lady of Mount Carmel Cathedral, Puntarenas

Indonesia

- Cathedral of Our Lady of Mount Carmel, Malang

Northern Mariana Islands

- Our Lady of Mount Carmel Cathedral (Chalan Kanoa)

Philippines

- Our Lady of Mount Carmel Cathedral, Jolo

United States

- St. Mary, Our Lady of Mount Carmel Cathedral (Gaylord, Michigan)

Venezuela

- Cathedral of Our Lady of Mount Carmel, Barquisimeto
- Cathedral of Our Lady of Mount Carmel, Maturín
- Cathedral of Our Lady of Mount Carmel, San Fernando de Apure

== See also ==
- Our Lady of Mount Carmel (disambiguation)
- Our Lady of Mount Carmel Church (disambiguation)
