= Our Lady of Carmel Cathedral, Cartago =

Coordinates: 9.8651°N 83.9225°W

Our Lady of Carmel Cathedral
- Catedral de Nuestra Señora del Carmen
- Our Lady of Carmel Cathedral
- Location: Cartago
- Country: Costa Rica
- Denomination: Roman Catholic Church

The Our Lady of Carmel Cathedral (Spanish: Catedral de Nuestra Señora del Carmen ) also called Cartago Cathedral is a religious building belonging to the Catholic Church and is located in the city of Cartago in the homonymous canton of the Central American country of Costa Rica. Not to be confused with a church of the same name in the city of Cartago in Colombia.

The temple follows the Roman or Latin rite and is the seat of the diocese of Cartago in Costa Rica (Dioecesis Carthaginensis in Costa Rica) that was created in May 2005 by the then Pope Benedict XVI through the bull "Saepe contingit". This temple is one of the 2 most important churches of the town, with the Basilica of Our Lady of the Angels (Basílica de Nuestra Señora de Los Ángeles).

Its history dates back to the parish church, which was built between 1954 and 1960 with Enrique Bolaños as the local priest during that time. Currently, it is under the pastoral responsibility of Bishop José Francisco Ulloa Rojas.

== See also ==
- Catholic Church in Costa Rica
- Puntarenas Cathedral
