= Our Lady of Mount Carmel Church, Gatchina =

Our Lady of Mount Carmel Church
- Церковь Пресвятой Девы Марии Кармельской
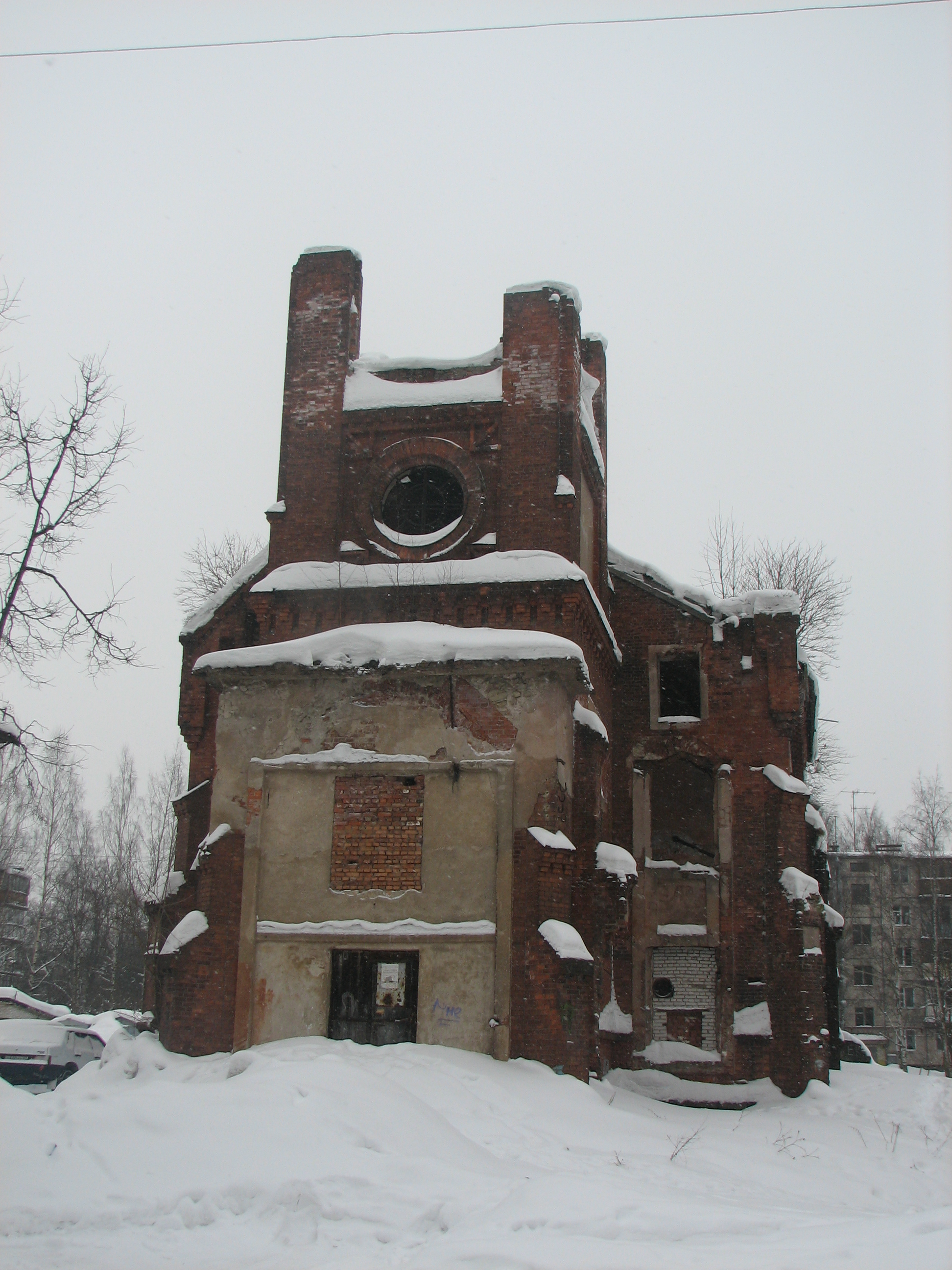
- The Church in 2011
- Our Lady of Mount Carmel Church
- Location: Gatchina
- Country: Russia
- Denomination: Roman Catholic Church

The Our Lady of Mount Carmel Church (Russian: Церковь Пресвятой Девы Марии Кармельской) It is a Catholic church located in Gatchina, near St. Petersburg in northwest Russia.

== History ==
The Catholic parish of Gatchina decided to build a church dedicated to Our Lady of Mount Carmel in 1906. The project was assigned to Lev Chichko, and construction continued until 1911 with the collaboration of Leonid Kharlamov and Alexander Baryshnikov. The Gothic Revival church was consecrated by Bishop Jan Cieplak the November 13, 1911, and depended on the parish of St. Catherine in St. Petersburg.

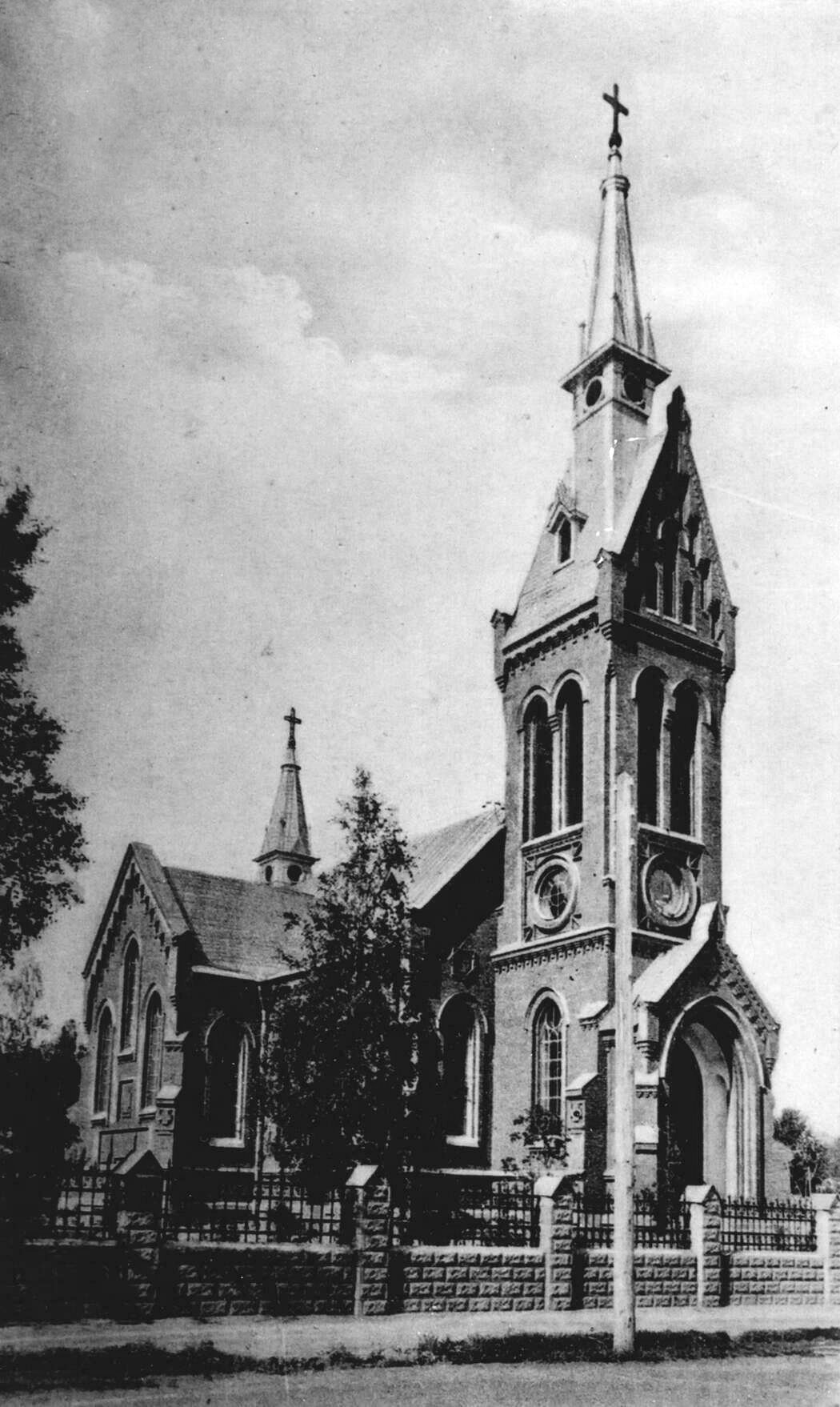
The church in 1910

During the Russian Civil War, the Church was the site of a Soviet war crime. According to Fr. Christopher Lawrence Zugger, "In 1920 at Gatchina (outside Petrograd), Bolsheviks demanded that the priest give up the keys to the Tabernacle, so they could gain access to, 'the greatest treasure of the Catholics'. The elderly priest refused, he was assaulted, and locksmith ordered to break open the tabernacle doors. The Holy Eucharist was dumped onto the floor and the Ciborium stolen. The priest died from the shock."

It closed in 1937 during Joseph Stalin's Great Terror, and this was confirmed in 1939, to become a bakery and after the war, during which the building was badly damaged, into a garage.

The Catholic parish of Gatchina was reborn in 1992 and met in a rented room. The church returned to the parish in 1994, but the first Masses are held in 1996, and episodically, for the church is not ready to welcome the faithful there. The parish is run by the Salesians.

== See also ==
- Roman Catholicism in Russia
- Our Lady of Mount Carmel Church
