= Carmine Church =

Carmine Church may refer to:

- Carmine Church, Carrara, a church in Carrara, Italy
- Chiesa del Carmine (Messina), a church in Messina, Italy
- Chiesa di Santa Croce in San Giacomo Maggiore (AKA Chiesa dei Carmini), Vicenza, Italy
