= Convent of Our Lady of Mount Carmel =

Convent of Our Lady of Mount Carmel or Convent of Nossa Senhora do Carmo may refer to:

- Igreja e Convento de Nossa Senhora do Carmo, Luanda, Angola
- Basilica and Convent of Nossa Senhora do Carmo, Recife, Brazil
- Church and Convent of Our Lady of Mount Carmel, Salvador, Bahia, Brazil
- Church and Convent of Our Lady of Mount Carmel (Cachoeira), Cachoeira, Bahia, Brazil
- Carmo Convent, Lisbon, Portugal
- Convent of Our Lady of Mount Carmel (Lagoa), Lagoa, Algarve, Portugal
- Convent of Nossa Senhora do Carmo (Horta), Azores, Portugal

== See also ==
- Our Lady of Mount Carmel (disambiguation)
