= Palazzo degli Anziani, Pistoia =

Gothic-style stone palace in Pistoia, Tuscany, Italy

Coordinates: 43.933769°N 10.918002°E

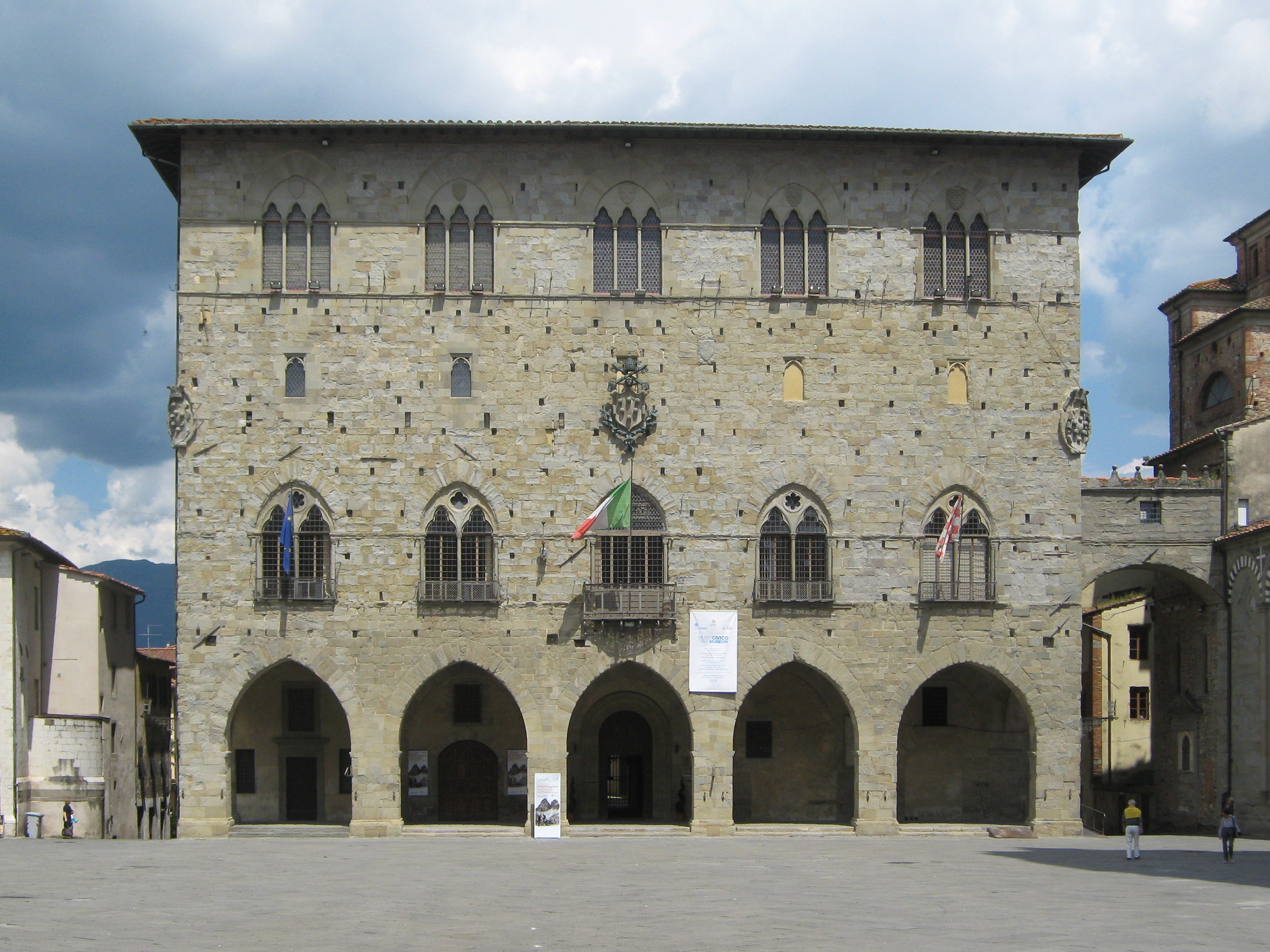
Palazzo del Comune, Pistoia

The Palazzo degli Anziani also known as the Palazzo del Comune, della Comunitá or del Giano is a Gothic-style stone palace located in the ancient historic center of Pistoia, Tuscany, Italy. The palace served as city hall for centuries; it still belongs to the comune and now mainly houses the Museo Civico d'Arte Antica (including works of the 19th century).

== Description and history ==
In 1295, while Giano della Bella was potestà of Pistoia, it was decided to build a residence for the magistrates or elders of the city. Previously they had been housed in a palace at via di Sracceria. In the present spot near the Pistoia Cathedral, land and houses were purchased from a number of families: Bellanti, Lazzari, Cremonesi, and others. By 1345, the three ground floor arches were erected, and the great hall in the main floor (piano nobile) was being built. Construction was completed in 1353 with mullioned windows. On the facade are the coat of arms of the Medici; the city coat of arms with red and white checkers is upheld by a bear, symbol of Pistoia as opposed to Florentine Lion, at the base of the main staircase. In 1637, a piano nobile corridor linking to the church was constructed.

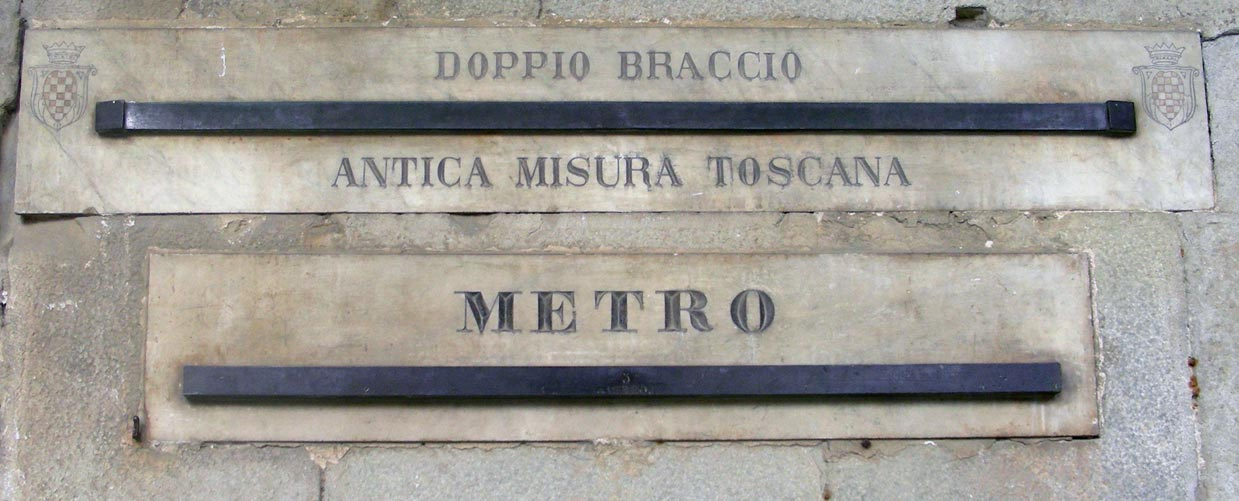
Meter and Double Braccio measure on wall

Supposedly the marble bust that was posted to the right of the central facade window on the piano nobile, represents the infamous Filippo Tedici, considered the traitor of Pistoia for having sold the town to the Lucchese condotierre Castruccio Castracani. He was killed and decapitated in battle, after Castruccio's death. Others think the bust and keys refer to someone of the Grandoni family who once confronted Pisa; the head was putatively in place prior to 1345.

On a wall of the palace is a display of the length of a Florentine "Braccio", the particular measure used in Tuscany, prior to the Napoleonic conquest, which ushered in the metric measurement (also featured). The Palazzo was the home to the meetings of the Pistoian Academy of Sciences, Letters and Arts from its foundation in 1803 until 1811, when the Napoleonic authorities granted them the suppressed convent of Santa Maria del Carmine of Pistoia.

== Museo Civico d'Arte Antica ==
The museum has been housed in the Palazzo since 1922. Its collections span nearly six centuries and include:

- St Francis and his Miracles by the Maestro della Croce 434 ( attributed to Coppo di Marcovaldo)
- St Francis receives Stigmata (circa 1270–1275, bas relief) by Nicola Pisano
- Mourning the Dead Christ (1310) by Lippo di Benivieni
- Holy Conversation (before 1510–1512) by Lorenzo di Credi
- Madonna della Pergola (1523) by Bernardino Detti
- Apollo and Marsyas by Cecco Bravo
- Danae by Giacinto Gimignani
- Presentation of Jesus at the Temple (1709–1719) by Anton Domenico Gabbiani
- Vedute of Piazza San Francesco (mid 18th-century) attributed to Francesco Maria Beneforti
- Radamisto murdering Zenobia (1796–1811) by Luigi Sabatelli
- Murder in Venice of Lorenzino de' Medici painted 1837–1840 by Giuseppe Bezzuoli
- Portrait of Niccolò Puccini (1843) also by Bezzuoli
