= Our Lady of Mount Carmel (disambiguation) =

Our Lady of Mount Carmel is a title for Mary, mother of Jesus. It may also refer to:

- Our Lady of Mount Carmel Catholic Church (disambiguation), in various locations
- Convent of Our Lady of Mount Carmel (disambiguation), in various locations
- Monastery of Our Lady of Mount Carmel in Finland
- Our Lady of Mount Carmel Cemetery (Wyandotte, Michigan)
- Order of the Brothers of Our Lady of Mount Carmel

== Schools ==
- Our Lady of Mount Carmel Learning Center (Mount Carmel La Salle), Roxas City, Philippines
- Our Lady of Mount Carmel School (Essex, Maryland)
- Our Lady of Mount Carmel High School (Wyandotte, Michigan)
- Our Lady of Mount Carmel Secondary School, Mississauga, Ontario, Canada
- Our Lady of Mount Carmel Elementary School (Kentucky)
- Our Lady of Mount Carmel Elementary School, Windsor, Ontario, Canada
