= Our Lady of Mount Carmel Parish Church (Pulong Buhangin) =

Roman Catholic church in Bulacan, Philippines

Our Lady of Mount Carmel Parish
- Parokya ng Birhen ng Bundok ng Karmelo (Filipino); Iglesia Parroquial de la Nuestra Señora del Monte Carmelo (Spanish)
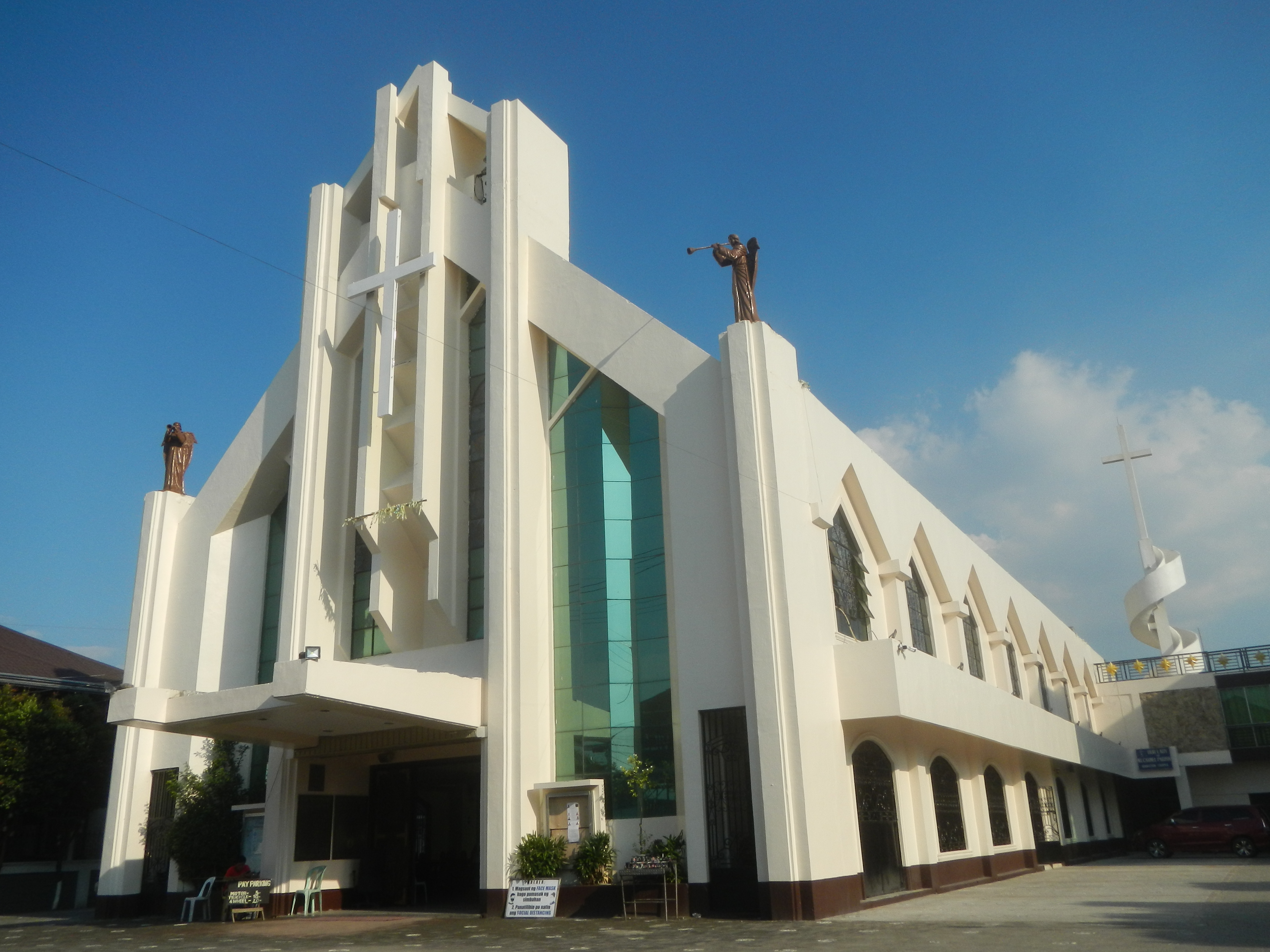
- Church facade in 2021

- Location in Bulacan Location in Luzon Location in the Philippines
- 14°51′58″N 120°59′42″E
- Location: Km. 38, Pulong Buhangin, Santa Maria, Bulacan
- Country: Philippines
- Denomination: Roman Catholic
- Website: www.olmcppb.com

History
- Status: Parish church
- Founded: March 23, 1941
- Founder: Various
- Dedication: Our Lady of Mount Carmel, Saint Sebastian

Architecture
- Functional status: Active
- Architectural type: Church building
- Style: Modern

Administration
- Archdiocese: Manila
- Diocese: Malolos
- Parish: Pulong Buhangin

Clergy
- Archbishop: Cardinal Jose Advincula
- Bishop: Dennis Cabanada Villarojo
- Priest(s): Virgilio C. Ramos; Irvin I. Hizon (guest)

Our Lady of Mount Carmel Parish, also known as Nuestra Señora del Carmen Parish, is a Roman Catholic church situated in Km. 38, Barangay Pulong Buhangin, Santa Maria, in the province of Bulacan, Philippines. It is under the jurisdiction of the Diocese of Malolos and within the Vicariate of Santa Maria.

Having been one of with rich history of origination, constant miracles and intercessions to her beloved land of Barrio Pulong Buhangin, and by the clamor of its devotees, the image has been granted with episcopal coronation on September 8, 2019. The devotees and parishioners fervently pray and excitingly await for the image to be granted with canonical coronation, and for the parish to be elevated to a diocesan shrine as the center of the brown scapular devotion in the Diocese.

In February 2023, the local government of Santa Maria conferred the title of "Mother and Queen of Pulong Buhangin" upon the image in question, following the passage of a resolution introduced by Honorable Jess De Guzman, a former municipal councilor. The resolution was based on the image's popularity among the parishioners and devotees, importance to the historical roots not only for Pulong Buhangin but also for Santa Maria, and several testimonies of miracles through the intercession of the our lady. The resolution was unanimously approved by the municipal council. To symbolize this historic moment, a badge with the logo of the municipal government was attached to the image.

Barangay Pulong Buhangin celebrates its barrio fiesta every third Sunday of February to commemorate the arrival of the image of our lady, otherwise known as "translacion" to the barrio. The parish also celebrates the memorial of Our Lady of Mount Carmel every July 16.

== History ==
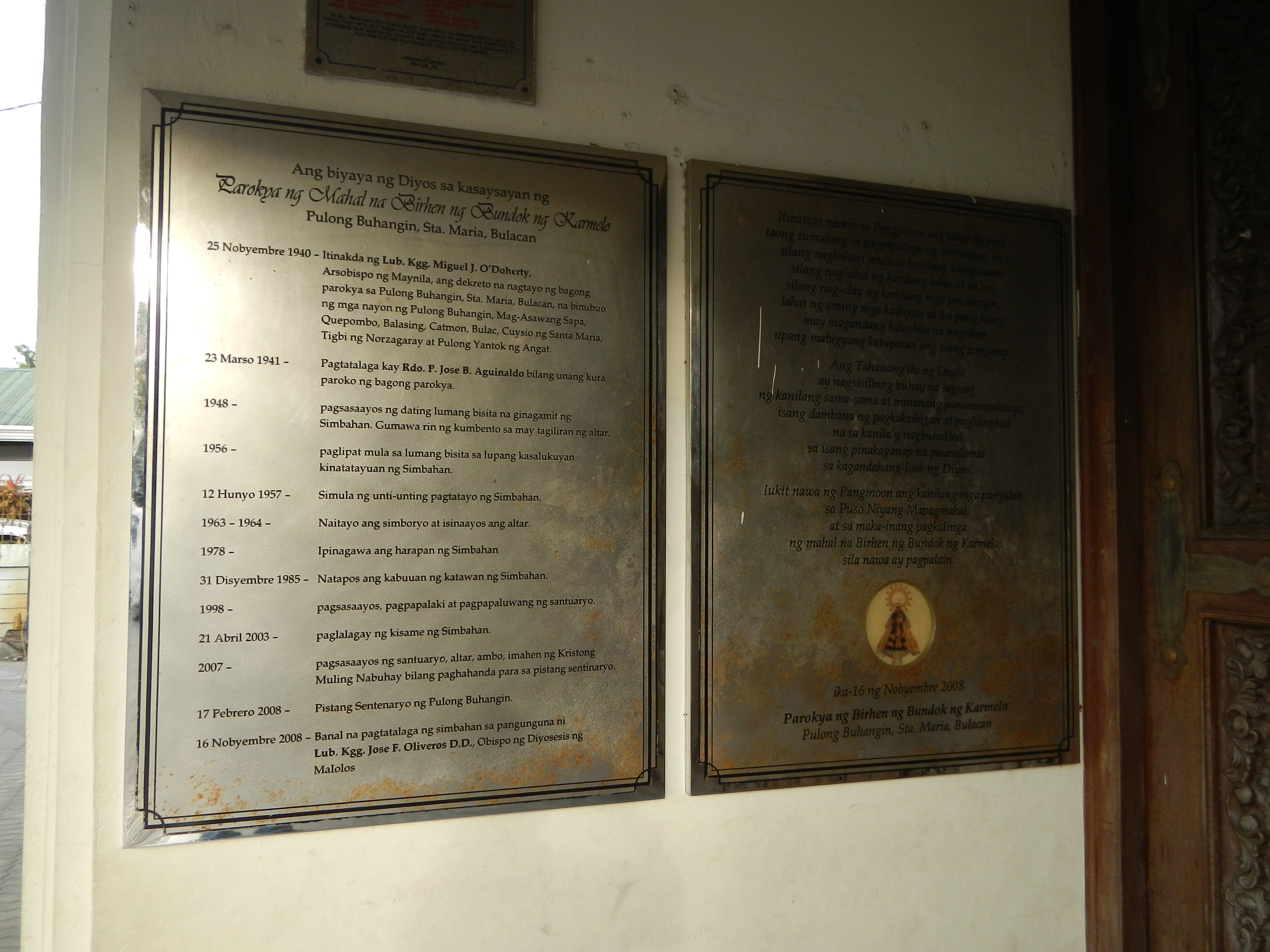
Historical plaques

The parish was established on November 25, 1940, by the decree of the Archbishop of Manila, Michael J. O'Doherty. This decree separated the barrios of Pulong Buhangin, Quepombo, Catmon, Tigbe, among others from the jurisdiction of La Purisima Concepcion Parish in Santa Maria. The parochial vicar of La Purisima Concepcion Parish at that time, Jose Aguinaldo was installed as its first parish priest.

The present day church was constructed in late 1950s where laborers were paid only five working days and donated their sixth working day to the church. Then after, the Archbishop of Manila, Cardinal Rufino Santos blessed the newly constructed church. This is the product of the grace of Our Lady of Mount Carmel and many years of toil and labor of the people of Pulong Buhangin, including generous donors (one of the donors was the archbishop himself). From a small chapel, it underwent renovation through the years into what it is today.

Significant improvements have been made to the church, thanks to the dedicated efforts of its parish priests, parishioners, and devoted volunteers. In 2007, under the supervision of Elmer Ignacio, who was the parish priest at the time, a substantial renovation of the altar was completed in preparation for the centennial fiesta and the dedication of the church. These important events took place on February 17, 2008, and November 16, 2008, respectively. The centennial fiesta had the theme: "Pamanang Pananampalataya, Bayang Naglilingkod" (Legacy of faith, a community that serves to God). Centennial markers were placed near the main door and the middle of the church grounds to commemorate the historical event. The relic of Therese of the Child Jesus, a prominent figure in the Carmelite society and one of the doctors of the church, was brought in the parish last 2008.

During the incumbency of Edgardo de Jesus, several improvements were also introduced in the church vicinity, such as the installation of statues of prominent saints connected to the Our Lady of Mount Carmel at the church fence, the church museum, mini-garden and wishing well, audio-visual room, and renovation of adoration chapel, among others.

On March 23, 2016, the parish celebrated its diamond jubilee year. The opening of the year-long celebration was through a Eucharistic celebration, spearheaded by Deogracias Iniguez Jr., Bishop Emeritus of Caloocan, Cirilo Almario Jr., Bishop Emeritus of Malolos, and several clergy of the diocese.

The current altar features a gold-painted bronze statue at the center, depicting a risen Christ with a cross backdrop. This signifies that Christ has triumphed over death, as symbolized by a risen Christ over a cross (interpretation should not be taken out of literal context). The nine-foot tall statue was specially crafted by Sandro Castrillo, a famous sculptor. The altar is flanked by retablos that house the Our Lady on the right and Saint Sebastian on the left. The church also features its old parish logo and maidens offering flowers and fruits installed at the front of the church dome, handcrafted by Philippine National Artist, Napoleon Abueva.

== Miraculous image of Our Lady of Mount Carmel in Pulong Buhangin ==
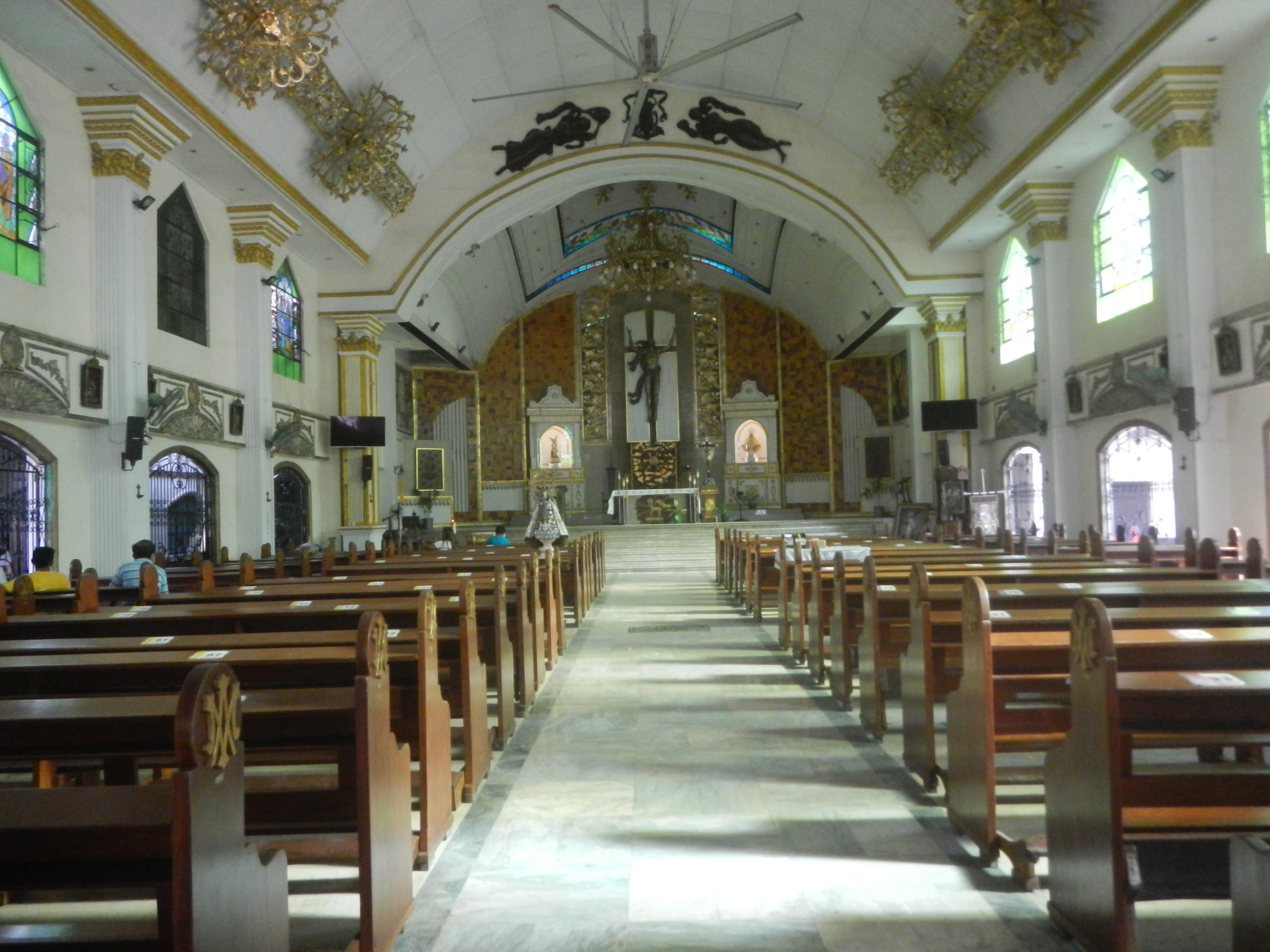
Church interior in 2021

The church is home to a miraculous century-old ivory image of Our Lady of Mount Carmel. This is the first known replica of the Our Lady of Mount Carmel in San Sebastian, Quiapo, Manila, which was brought by the Carmelites from Mexico in 1618. Legend says an old lady (believed to have been the Virgin Mary) approached an old man dwelling in the barrio named "Kunino" and instructed him to build a chapel. The old lady gave a letter and said that it must be presented to Simeon and Simeona, the richest spouses in the barrio to provide him the funds needed for the construction. Kunino approached the spouses and gave the letter. Simeon and Simeona refused to the request and then the letter was put into fire. To the surprise of the witnesses, the letter was not consumed by fire. This was considered one of the first miracles of the Our Lady. Due to shock of what happened, the spouses immediately ordered the construction of the chapel. After this event, the old lady appeared again to Kunino, and instructed him to get an image of Our Lady from the Augustinian friars in San Sebastian Church (Manila). Kunino followed the instructions set forth by the old lady and went to San Sebastian Church. He requested an image of the Our Lady of Mount Carmel to the friars. At first, Kunino brought a sketch of the Our Lady, but the old lady appeared again and said that he must request for an image. Kunino went back to San Sebastian Church. Before the friars granted the image, Kunino endured the conditions provided by the friars, one of which is that Kunino must stay in the church for nine days to pray, in order to test his faith and determination. Pilgrims from another province were likewise present to request for an image. Nevertheless, the original image meant for Kunino was given to the said pilgrims. The friars made another image, crafted specially for Kunino. Afterwards, the image was brought by Kunino from San Sebastian Church to the barrio of Pulong Buhangin. This event is also known as "traslacion". In commemoration of the arrival, the barrio of Pulong Buhangin celebrates its barrio fiesta every month of February.

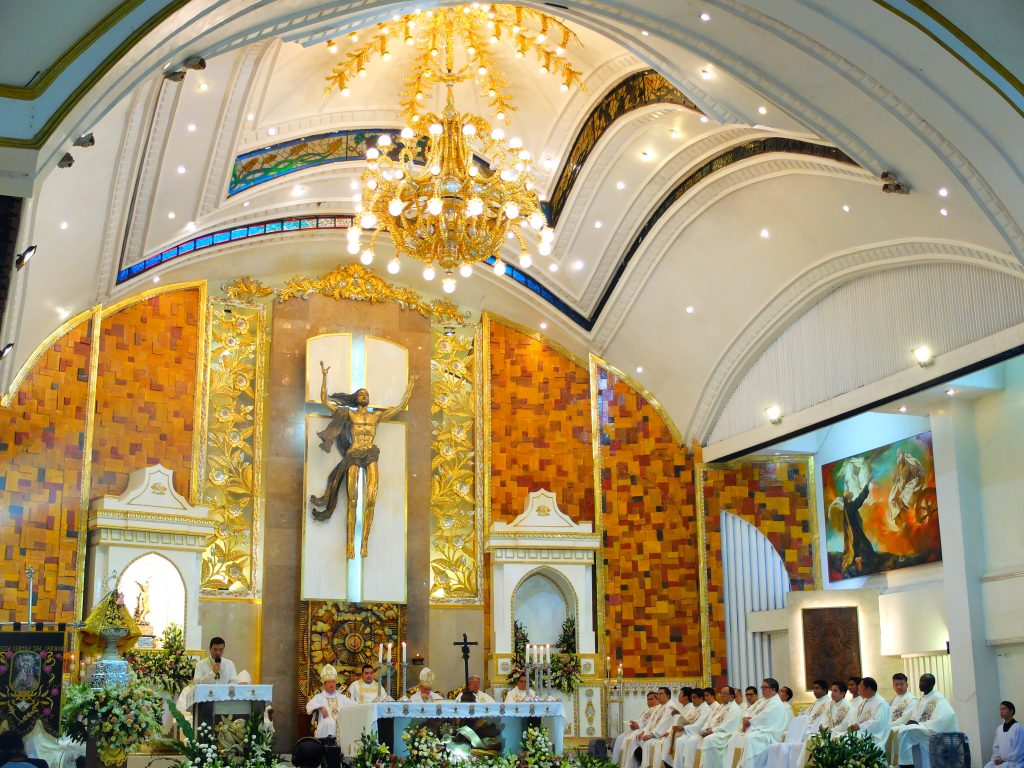
Church sanctuary during the Episcopal Coronation

An excerpt of the book entitled "Kasaysayan ng Nuestra Senora del Carmen" details on how the image was brought from San Sebastian to the barrio of Pulong Buhangin:

Nang kay Kuninong tanggapin
ang rebulto ng Del Karmen
buong lugod ng panimdim
di natumigil, noon din
umuwi sa Pulong Buhangin.
Nang idating naman dito
sa Pulong Buhanging barrio
ang sa Del Karmeng rebulto
Lunes noon ng Pebrero
ika- siyam namang husto.
Noo'y apat na raan na
na apat saka apat pa
nang bilang limang po at isa
na edad ng mundo't siglang
binabagtas ng lahat na.

== Episcopal Coronation of the Revered Image ==
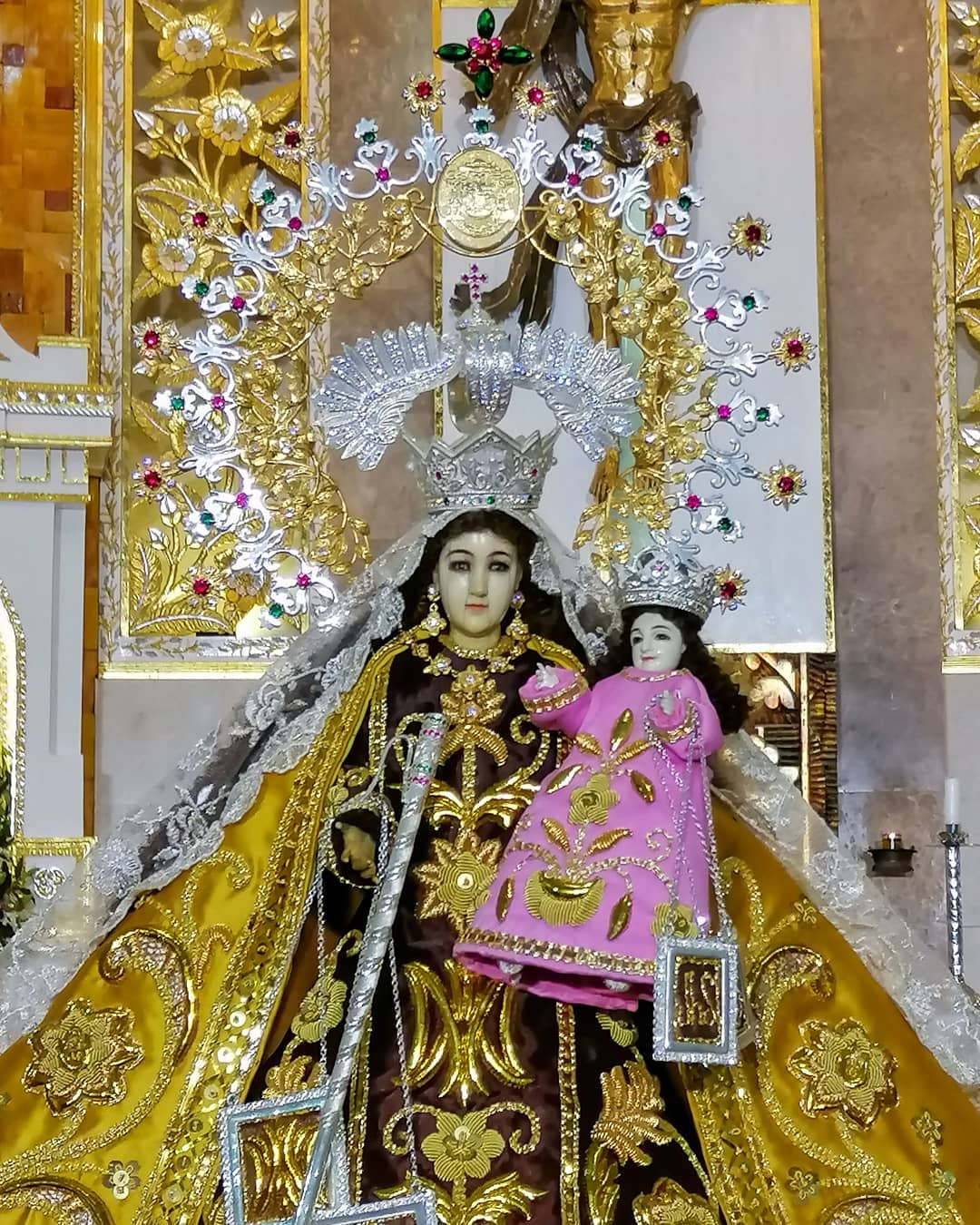
The Episcopally crowned image of Our Lady of Mount Carmel

On May 31, 2019, the Diocese of Malolos, through the authority of the bishop of the Diocese of Cubao and by then concurrently the apostolic administrator of the Diocese of Malolos, Honesto F. Ongtioco has promulgated a decree, granting an episcopal coronation of the revered image of the Our Lady of Mount Carmel of San Sebastian of Pulong Buhangin. The decree was originally signed by Ongtioco and Cenon Dennis G. Santos, Chancellor of the Diocese. It read as follows:

Ad Perpetuam Rei Memoriam - Decretum: On the occasion of the 354 years of devotion to Our Lady of Mount Carmel, I, Honesto Flores Ongtioco, D.D., Bishop of Cubao and Apostolic Administrator of Malolos, by the grace of God and the Apostolic See, and by virtue of the power granted upon me, after having reviewed the petition made by the Parish of Our Lady of Mount Carmel Pulong Buhangin, Santa Maria, Bulacan, through its parish priest, the Rev. Fr. Edgardo C. de Jesus, do hereby decree and promulgate: The Solemn Episcopal Coronation of the Image of Our Lady of Mount Carmel. May Mary, our blessed mother, the Virgin of Mount Carmel continue to intercede for us. Given on this 31st day of May, Feast of Visitation of the Blessed Virgin Mary, in the year of our Lord, 2019, National Year of the Youth at the Cathedral - Basilica Minore of the Immaculate Conception, Malolos City, Bulacan.

The image was solemnly crowned on September 8, 2019, the feast of the nativity of the Blessed Virgin Mary. The episcopal coronation and the Eucharistic celebration was spearheaded by the fifth bishop of Malolos, Dennis C. Villarojo, together with Honesto F. Ongtioco, Bishop of Cubao and former Apostolic Administrator of the Diocese of Malolos, Wilfredo Manlapaz, Bishop Emeritus of Tagum, Benjamin Almoneda, Bishop Emeritus of Daet, and the clergy of the diocese. This is the first Marian coronation headed by Villarojo, since assuming the episcopacy of the Diocese of Malolos.

More than a thousand devotees joined to reenact Kunino's "translacion" from San Sebastian Church to Barrio Pulong Buhangin and flocked to the parish to witness the coronation of the beloved Patroness and Queen of Barrio Pulong Buhangin. The parish officially presents the title of the image as "Nuestra Señora del Carmen de San Sebastian de Pulong Buhangin" Ina at Reyna ng Pulong Buhangin. (English: Our Lady of Mount Carmel of Saint Sebastian of Pulong Buhangin, Mother and Queen of Pulong Buhangin).

As commemoration for the historic event, the parish issued memorabilia e.g. limited edition shirts, compact disks (CDs) containing originally-produced music for the coronation and scapulars, among others. The church's retablo was also redesigned to adjust the pedestal of the our lady to the center of the altar. Vine chandeliers were also installed at the ceiling of the church, and a huge crown-shaped chandelier was installed in the parish building, symbolizing the coronation.

== Parish priests ==
The following priests have served the church.

	Parish Priest	Term	Current role
1.	Jose B. Aguinaldo	1941-1951	Deceased
2.	Daniel Buñing	1951-1955	Deceased
3.	Cenon Bernabe	1955-1962	Deceased
4.	Pablo Reyes	1962-1963	Deceased
5.	Eliseo Perigrino	1963-1968	Deceased
6.	Pedro J. Rada	1968-1969	Deceased
7.	Mariano Sanchez	1969-1972	Deceased
8.	Jose Cruz	1972	Deceased
9.	Fernando G. Gutierrez	1972-1974	Deceased
10.	Bartolome S. Bernabe	1974-1978	Deceased
11.	Enrico S. Santos	1978-1985	Retired
12.	Francisco Sta. Ana	1985-1992	Deceased
13.	Leon G. Coronel	1993-2002	Parish priest of St. Joseph the Worker Parish in Poblacion, City of San Jose Del Monte, Bulacan
14.	Elmer R. Ignacio	2002-2013	Parish priest and rector of the National Shrine and Parish of Our Lady of Fatima in Marulas, Valenzuela City
15.	Edgardo C. De Jesus	2013-2021	
16.	Virgilio C. Ramos	2021–present	

== Present administration ==
The parish is currently under the pastorship of Virgilio "Vergs" C. Ramos as the 16th parish priest (Filipino: Kura Paroko) of the church and is the de facto chairman of the Parish Pastoral Council. Ramos' previous post was as the parish priest and rector of San Pascual Baylon Parish and the National Shrine of Our Lady of Salambao in Obando, Bulacan. Ramos was formally installed in the parish on February 15, 2021.

== Gallery ==
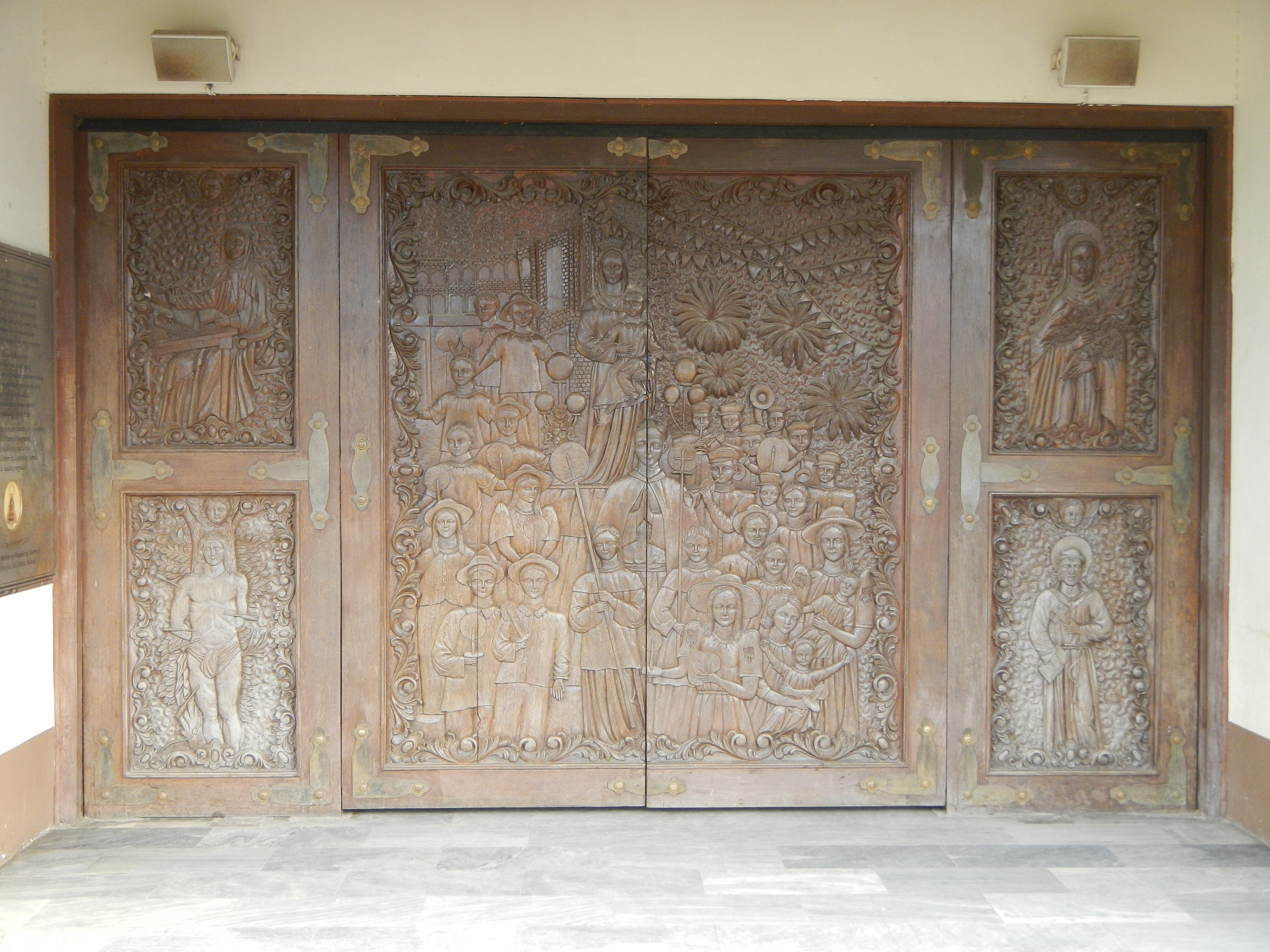
Church main portal

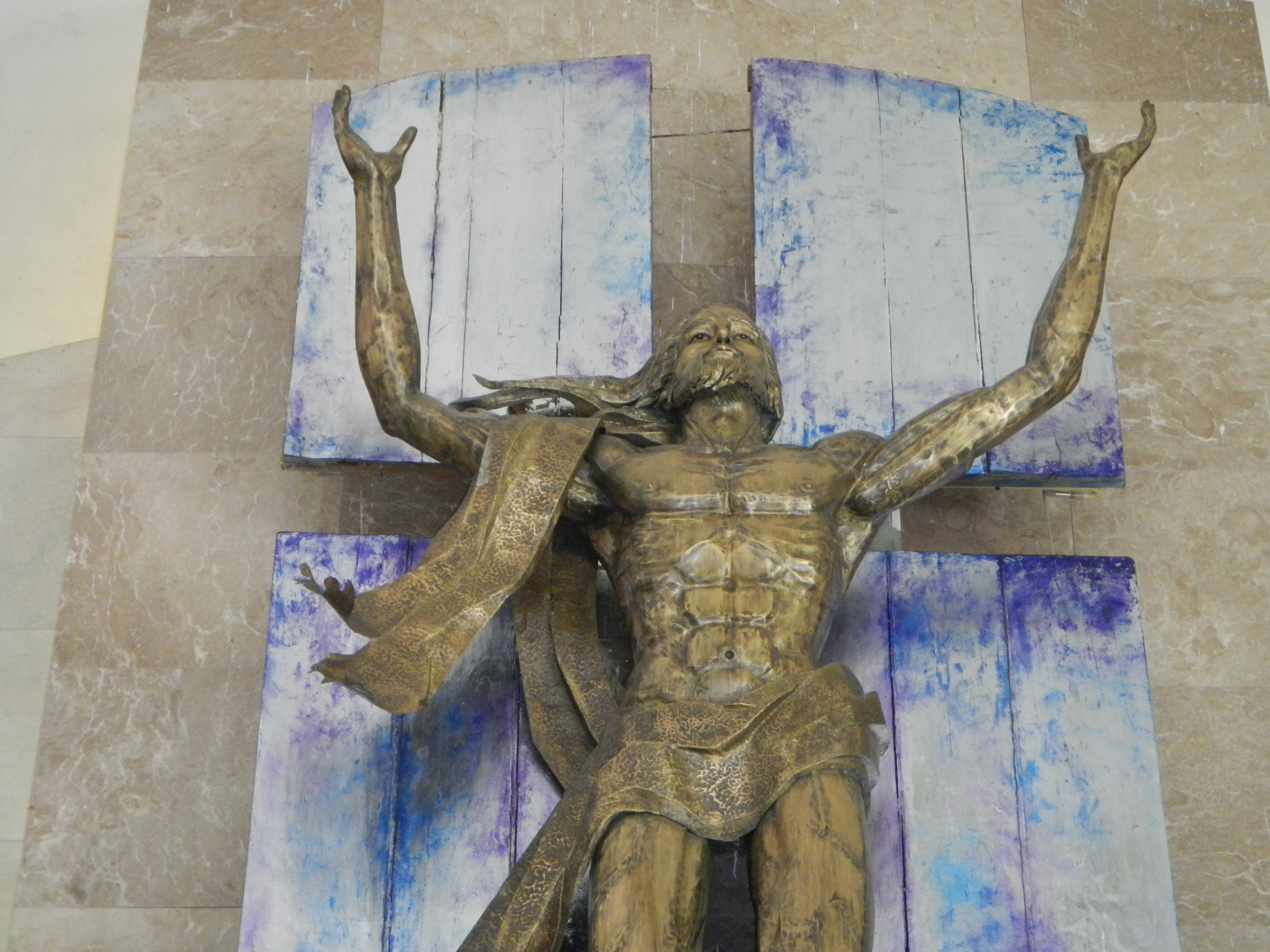
Detail of the church altar crucifix

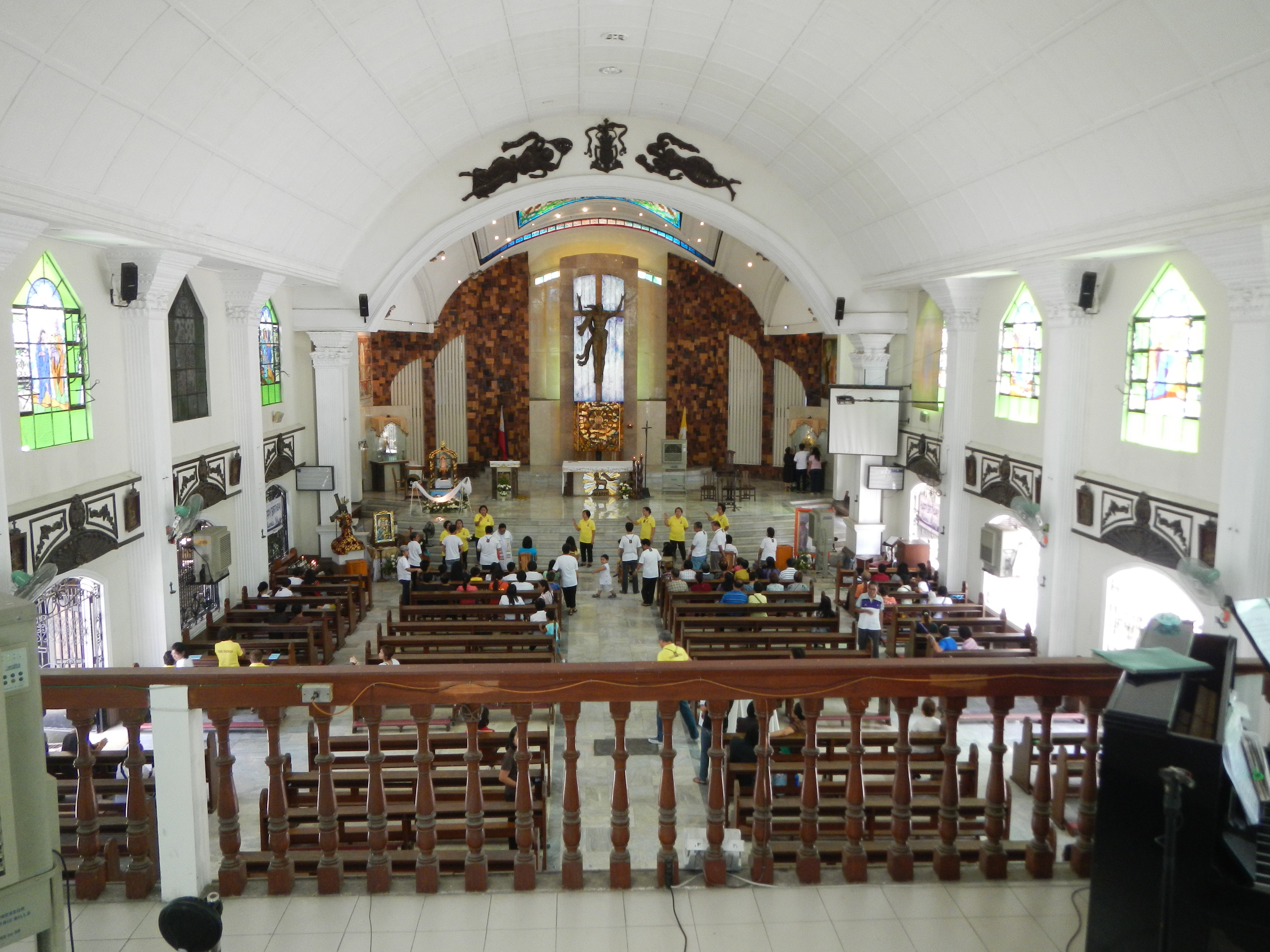
Church interior viewed from the choir loft

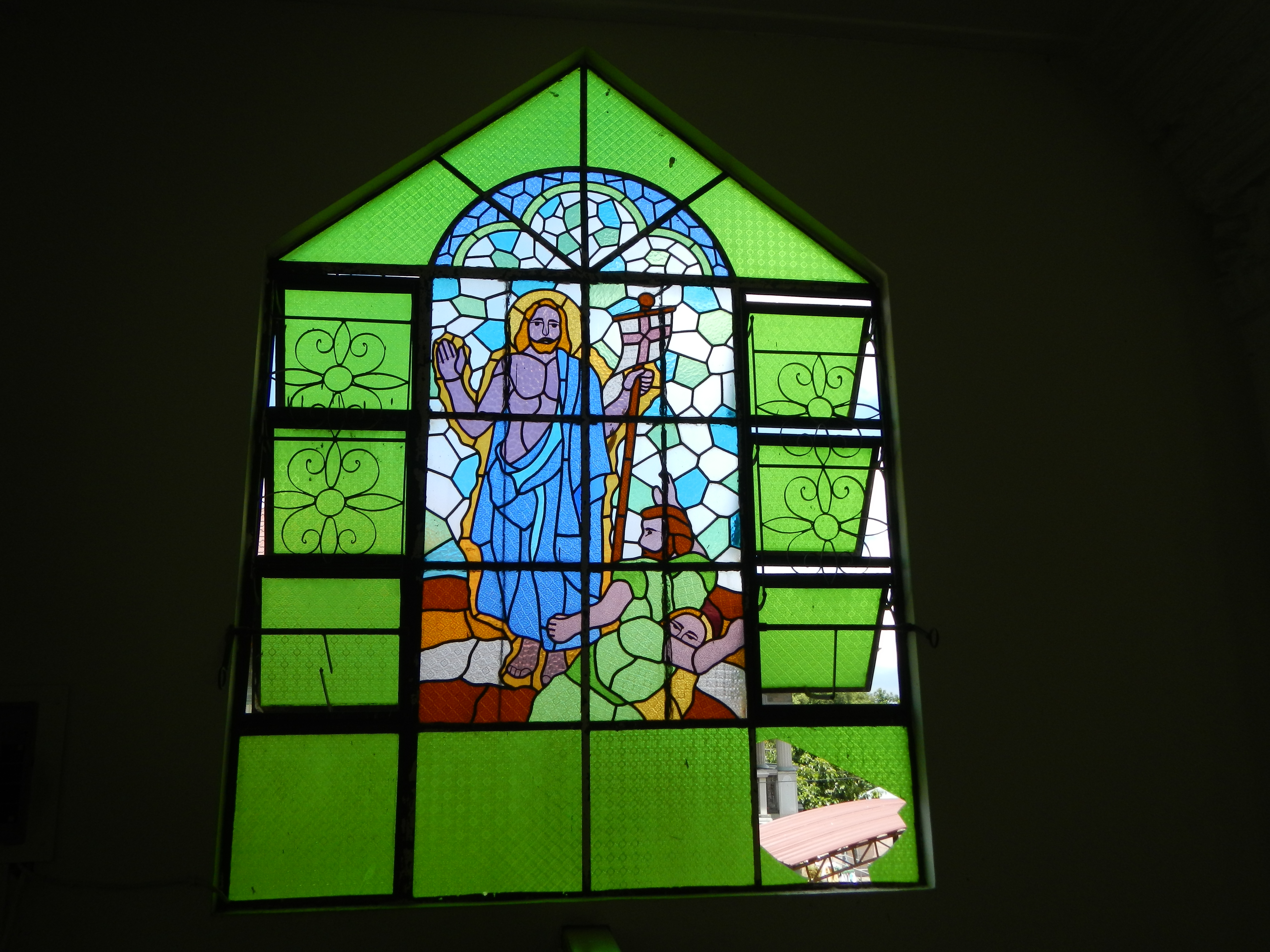
Stained glass window

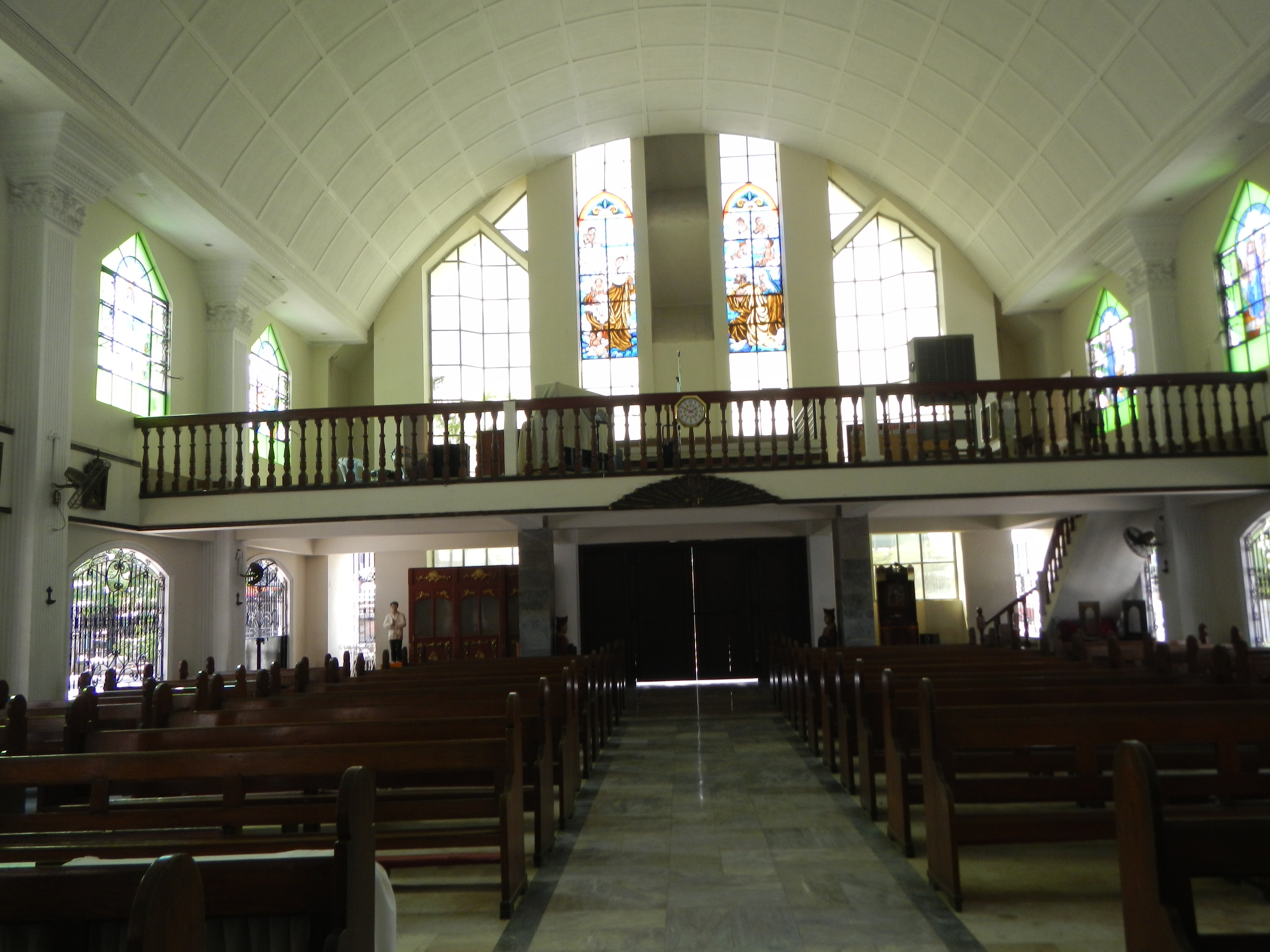
Choir loft
