= Santa Maria del Carmine, Faenza =

Church building in Faenza, Italy

Coordinates: 44.2824°N 11.8811°E

The Church of the Carmine or Santa Maria del Carmine is a Roman Catholic religious building located attached to an adjacent convent in Faenza, region of Emilia-Romagna, Italy.

== History ==
The church at the site was erected in 1486 under the patronate of Galeotto Manfredi, and first affiliated with the Gesuati order. The church later was attached to the Discalced Carmelites in the 17th century, and underwent further restructuring.

The church had sculptures representing the Virgin of the Carmine, Saint Francesca Romana and a Crucifix by Giovanni Ballanti Graziani. The Sacristy held in the 19th century a Descent of the Holy Spirit (1570-1580) by Niccolò Paganelli. There was also a canvas depicting St Onofrius by Carlo Spadini. It also contains some 18th-century paintings by Ignaz Stern.
