= Our Lady of Mount Carmel High School (Wyandotte, Michigan) =

Location
- 2609 Tenth Street; Wyandotte, (Wayne County), Michigan 48192; United States; 42°12′25″N 83°9′52″W

Information
- Type: Private, Coeducational
- Religious affiliation: Roman Catholic
- Established: 1928
- Founder: Rev. Peter S. Kruszka
- Status: Closed
- Closed: June 2011
- Grades: 9–12
- Colors: Red and White
- Team name: Comets
- Rival: St. Patrick High School, Wyandotte
- Newspaper: "The Carmonte"
- Yearbook: "Carmion" (1948 - 1970) "Terminus" (1971 - 2011)
- Affiliation: Felician Sisters

Our Lady of Mount Carmel High School, (Polish: Matki Bożej Szkaplerznej Wyższej Szkoły) was a private, Roman Catholic high school in Wyandotte, Michigan to the parish of Our Lady of Mount Carmel. It closed in June, 2011 due to low enrollment.

== History ==
In September 1928, the dream of establishing a high school became a reality for Rev. Peter Kruszka and dedicated parishioners. Our Lady of Mount Carmel High School was officially opened in a newly constructed two-story annex located on Electric Street and staffed by the Felician Sisters. The school achieved a significant milestone in 1933, gaining accreditation from esteemed institutions such as the University of Michigan and the Catholic University of America. Later, it also received accreditation from the Michigan Non-Public School Accrediting Association (MNSSA). With its impressive array of licenses, approbations, and accreditations from the State of Michigan, the school earned a reputation as one of the top educational institutions in the nation.

The school experienced steady growth in its early years. The first year, 1928, began with 26 students, increasing to 127 by 1932, when the full high school program was established. Initially, the curriculum consisted of required subjects, but as enrollment grew, it expanded to include a broader range of general and vocational courses. These additions included ethics, science, mathematics, languages, commercial sciences, social studies, home economics, drafting, music, and physical education. The remarkable growth and advancement of the school can be attributed to the tireless efforts of its dedicated pastors and principals. Rev. Ladislaus Krych played a particularly significant role in driving this progress. Several principals made notable contributions to the school's development, including:

- Sister Mary Simplicia, the pioneering principal in 1928
- Sister Mary Bernadette, an exceptional teacher and acting principal from 1928 to 1931
- Sister Mary Emmanuel, who fostered character development, promoted athletics, and advocated for higher education during her two tenure periods (1931-1935 and 1939-1946)
- Sister Mary Bonifilia, who emphasized extracurricular activities from 1935 to 1937
- Sister Mary Cantia, who facilitated the school's growth from 1937 to 1940

Under Sister Mary Emmanuel's efficient leadership from 1940 to 1946, the school achieved its highest standards. This period saw significant improvements in the curriculum, facilities, and resources, all made possible through the collaborative efforts of Sr. Emmanuel and Fr. Krych.

In the 1940s, Fr. Krych demonstrated his commitment to education by sponsoring ten annual scholarships to the high school. These scholarships were awarded to students from Our Lady of Mt. Carmel, St. John Cantius (Delray), St. Stanislaus Kostka (Wyandotte), and St. Helena (Wyandotte) through competitive exams held at their respective schools. Additionally, Fr. Krych sponsored a $600 scholarship to Madonna College in Livonia. Furthermore, a generous anonymous donor from New Boston, Michigan, provided numerous scholarships to both the high school and elementary school, specifically benefiting students from New Boston. During World War II, the school introduced relevant courses in aeronautics, occupations, first aid, nutrition, and home nursing. As the curriculum expanded, so did the teaching staff.

In its time, the school boasted top-notch facilities, earning it a "Class A" classification. The school's library was particularly impressive, featuring thousands of fiction and non-fiction volumes, twelve sets of encyclopedias, and multiple magazine subscriptions. The science laboratory was fully equipped for physics and chemistry experiments, while the music studio offered an excellent selection of instruments for band and orchestra. Additionally, the school had a thriving drama department, providing students with a well-rounded educational experience.

Beyond its academic endeavors, the school fostered creativity and self-expression through various extracurricular clubs. These clubs catered to diverse interests, in areas such as: art, music, drama, and vocational skills. The drama club was particularly active, with talented students performing in numerous productions throughout the school's history. Our Lady of Mt. Carmel High School's publications began in 1943 with the launch of the school newspaper, "The Carmont." Five years later, in 1948, the first yearbook, "The Carmion," was published. Since then, numerous editors, staff members, and moderators have worked tirelessly to uphold the principles of excellent journalism. In 1971, the school published another hardcover yearbook, titled "Terminus," which served as a milestone in the school's publication history.

Complementing its academic programs, Our Lady of Mt. Carmel High School offered a comprehensive extracurricular religious program, building on its regular ethics classes. This program included: annual retreats for spiritual reflection and growth, the Junior Unit Holy Name Society, reestablished by Fr. Krych to encourage boys' spiritual development and frequent sacramental participation, the St. Casimir Society for altar boys, St. Theresa Sodality for girls, and school membership in the CSMC Unit, part of a broader Catholic Action program initiated in 1929. These initiatives fostered a strong spiritual foundation and encouraged students to engage in their faith beyond regular classes.

Fr. Kruszka and Fr. Krych left an indelible mark on Our Lady of Mt. Carmel High School as exceptional spiritual advisers and athletic directors. Fr. Krych, in particular, earned the affection and admiration of students through his kindness, paternal care, and pioneering efforts in establishing a comprehensive athletic program. Under his guidance, the school introduced various sports teams, including: Baseball (1942), Basketball (1936), Rowing (1944), Football (1945), and Girls' Basketball (1944). Fr. Krych's dedication to the athletic program helped shape the school's spirit and culture. The school had maintained a collection of trophies from various sports, dating back to the early 1940s. However, in 2014, Rev. Mark Borkowski made the decision to dispose of these trophies.

Several organizations played a vital role in supporting Our Lady of Mt. Carmel High School's athletic programs and other needs. These included: he Ushers Club and the Friends of the Comets. In the spring of 1945, Fr. Krych began exploring the possibility of introducing a football program at Our Lady of Mt. Carmel High School. To turn this idea into reality, he enlisted the help of Thomas Watkowski, proposing that they assemble a group of men to raise funds for football equipment. A six-member committee was formed, consisting of Robert Bednarek, Alex Uszynski, John Jacobs, Henry Stec, Frank Wszelaki, and Thomas Watkowski. The committee organized a dance on September 22, 1945, which proved highly successful, generating a profit of $930. This substantial sum was then presented to the Athletic Fund of Our Lady of Mt. Carmel High School, paving the way for the launch of the football program.

Building on their initial success, the committee expanded its membership by welcoming nine new young men: Anthony Siemion, Peter Jablonski, Bertram Lange, Leonard Kowaleski, Albert Hebda, Roman Watkowski, Walter Przytula, Steve Tar, and Len Stoh. With renewed enthusiasm, the enlarged committee set its sights on further achievements. Their efforts led to two significant donations: $500 towards the purchase of a rowing shell and $600 towards acquiring new instruments for the Mt. Carmel Band.

The collective enthusiasm, cooperation, and camaraderie among the initial 15 members inspired them to establish a formal club. On December 9, 1945, The Oak Club was founded with the primary objective of promoting athletics through fundraising efforts via various social events. The Oak Club's generosity continued unabated in 1949. Through successful monthly dances, a high-profile event featuring Skitch Henderson at Wyandotte Chemicals, and an annual picnic paired with a car raffle, the club amassed a substantial sum. This total of $1,250 enabled the school to cover various expenses, including: advertising programs, team transportation costs, organization of the Mt. Carmel Legion team.

=== Boys' Basketball ===
In 1939, the Our Lady of Mt. Carmel Basketball Squad was renamed “The Comets”. Under Coach Szydlowski they finished two seasons. Later, Joe Piatek was named coach. He coached one championship team before enlisting in the Marines in 1942. Leaving before the title game with St. Josephat (Detroit), the former coach ended the season. Bob Bednarek took the leadership of the team during the seasons extending from 1942 – 1946. In these years he led them into two divisional and one district championship.

=== School Band ===
In 1940, Sister Mary Emmanuel initiated the first Our Lady of Mount Carmel band. Sister Mary Paulette directed the band along with Mr. E. Jensen as band instructor. Band awards were won by Our Lady of Mount Carmel for the first time in Wyandotte, July 4, 1948. Prizes consisted of : first place for best music, for best drum major, for best drilled band, and tied with Theoedore Roosevelt High School (Wyandotte) for best dressed band. Prizes amounted to $225.00. In 1968, Mount Carmel's marching band ceased to exist, but the orchestra lingered on until 1971. The school also had a glee club for several years.

=== Baseball ===
“The Comets” took to baseball in 1942 when they played in the city recreation league. They took top awards by downing all opposition. Although they made a fine showing, baseball was discontinued the following season. After a three-year lapse, in 1945, the Comets took to the diamonds and under Rev. Father Wyrzykowski won one of their four games. The next season found Joe Piatek at the helm of a team that captured the West Side title. On June 6 they met St. Florian (Hamtramck) at Briggs Stadium and almost turned in the greatest upset of the season when a seventh inning rally fell short of the mark. The final score read: St. Florian 3, Mt. Carmel 1. With this game they closed the season. In 1947, the Comets set out to retain their title, but, as the season got under way, it was evident that they lost the spark that sent them forth the previous year. After the final tally was taken, the Comets were found in second place.

=== Football ===
Football was introduced into Our Lady of Mt. Carmel High School in 1945. The initial game was played on Sunday, September 30. That year the Comets were under the supervision of Roman Watkowski and Captain Henry Lojewski. Although they won only one of seven grid battles, they showed great promise. During this season, the Knights of Columbus donated a victory trophy which went to the victor of the annual Mt. Carmel – St. Patrick game. In 1946, Fr. Krych named Joe Piatek as coach and Roman Watkowski as his assistant. The Comets finished their season tied for third place by winning 5 and losing 2. A majority of returning letter winners were on hand when the Comets began practice for their third season of league play under the direction of Coach Piatek. A month later, the first league game was played which ended in a scoreless tie with Sacred Heart (Dearborn). Following this contest, there were two victories before the Comets were dropped by St. Patrick for the third straight year in the battle for the Knights of Columbus trophy. A layoff of one week followed, allowing time for the hurt Comets to lick their wounds. The remaining opposition seemed to be no match for Mt. Carmel as they rolled over all opponents finishing the season with possession of second place.

=== Rowing ===
In 1944, with a borrowed four shell and the hope of establishing a new era in Our Lady of Mt. Carmel's Athletic program, a trailblazing crew began practice with no established coach. This four doubled in 1945. That year the crew was coached by Ed Kalisiewicz, who was to become coach for three more years. Although no outstanding meets were won, that eight was the first Catholic High School Crew in the State of Michigan. In 1946, the first victory came on June 8. Later, they became Midwest Champions by winning four out of seven races. On May 24, 1947, Our Lady of Mt. Carmel entered a four in the National Scholastic Rowing Regatta held in Wyandotte and by winning that, they became the National Schoolboy Champs.
