= Our Lady of Mount Carmel Church, Cruz Bay =

Our Lady of Mount Carmel Church
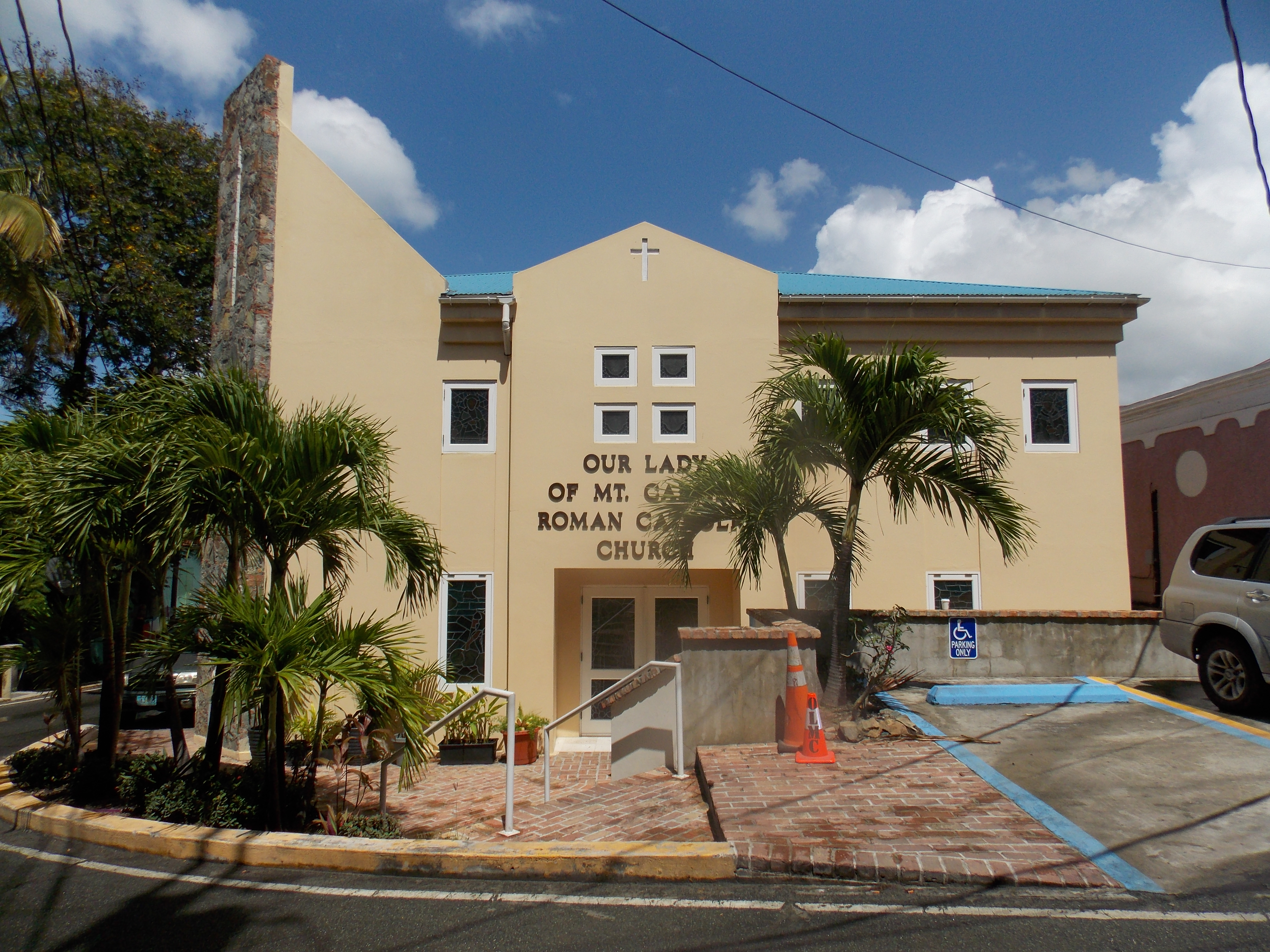
- Our Lady of Mount Carmel Church
- 18°19′48.7″N 64°47′43.7″W
- Location: Cruz Bay
- Country: United States Virgin Islands
- Denomination: Roman Catholic Church

The Our Lady of Mount Carmel Church is a religious building belonging to the Catholic Church and is located in the town of Cruz Bay, Saint John the smallest of the three main islands of the US Virgin Islands in the Caribbean Sea.

The church was opened and blessed in 1962, follows the Roman or Latin rite and is under the jurisdiction of the Diocese of St. Thomas in the Virgin Islands (Dioecesis Sancti Thomae in Insulis Virgineis). It has its origins in the donation of land that made William Callahan in early 1960 to build a Catholic parish.

In 2012 the parish began a campaign to seek a donation of land to build another church in the sector because the current church became insufficient for the needs and size of the congregation.

== See also ==
- Roman Catholicism in the United States Virgin Islands

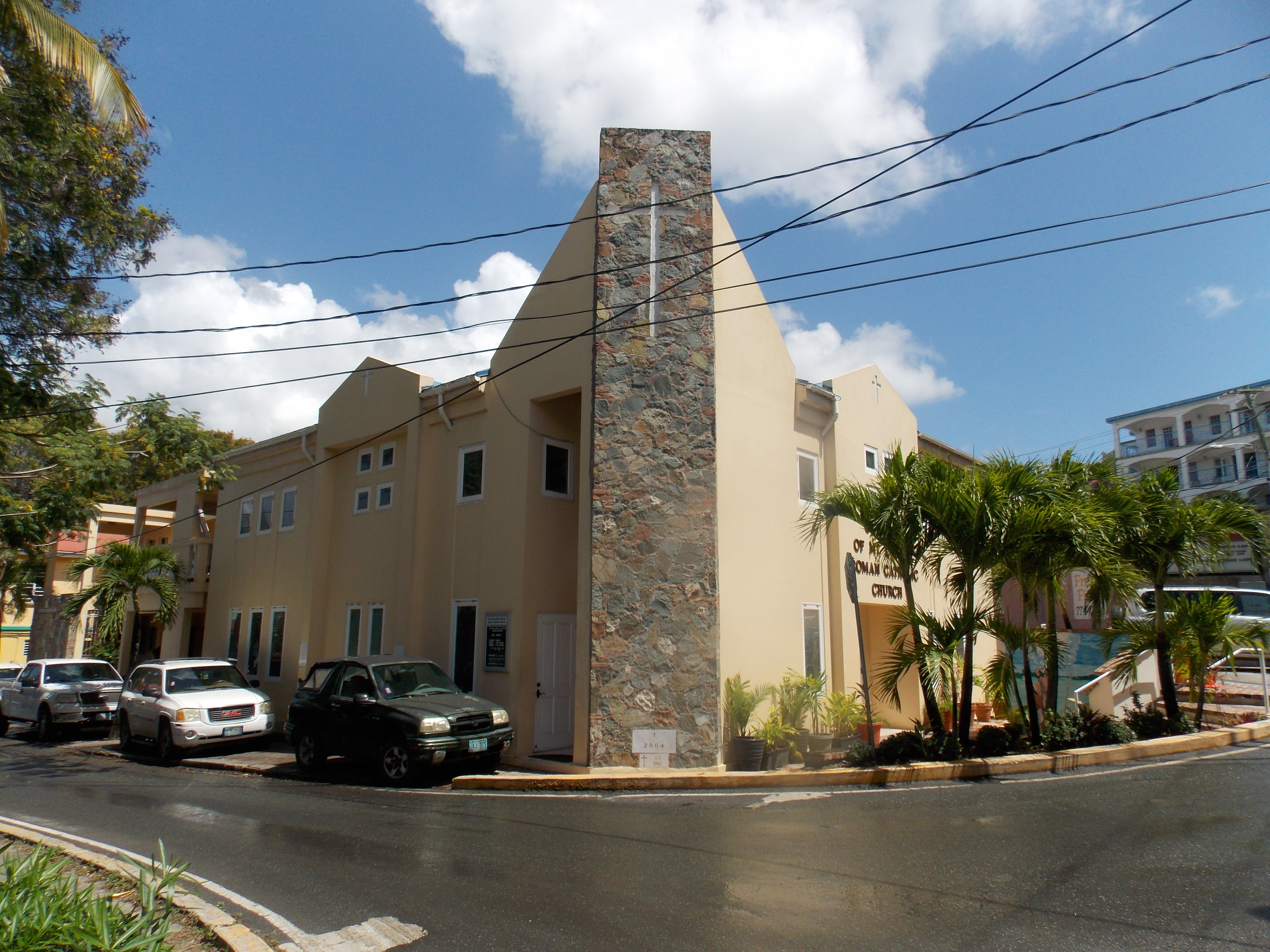
Another View

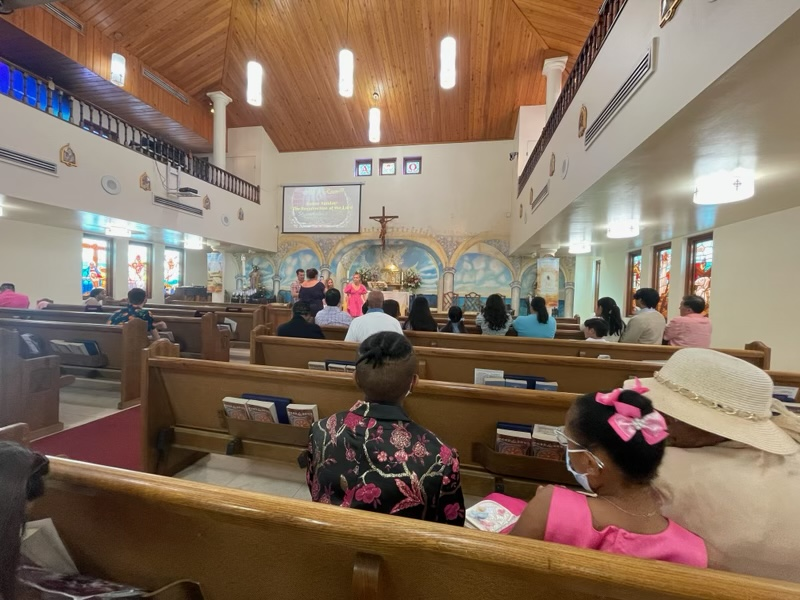
The inside of the church
