= Madonna del Carmelo, Regalbuto =

Church building in Regalbuto, Italy

Coordinates: 37.6°N 14.5°E

The church of the Madonna del Carmelo is the a Roman Catholic church in the town of Regalbuto, province of Enna, region of Sicily, Italy.

== History ==
A church at the site was present by the early 15th-century. It appears to have then linked with to an adjacent former Carmelite order convent. Initially the convent had been in the valley of Monte Calogero, outside of the town, but moved behind this building. This church remained unfinished by the 18th-century, and required major refurbishments that were completed 1760–1780. As is more frequent for sanctuary churches, the layout is octagonal. Much of the interior decoration has been moved to the church of Santa Maria dell Croce, while this church undergoes restoration.

On March 25, 1848, during a celebration of a mass in honor of the Virgin, protesters hurled insults at the Virgin. This led to riot in the town during which the reactionary pro-Bourbon forces massacred 27 persons aligned with the liberal elements in town.
