= Our Lady of Mount Carmel Church (Wyandotte, Michigan) =

Our Lady of Mount Carmel Catholic Church
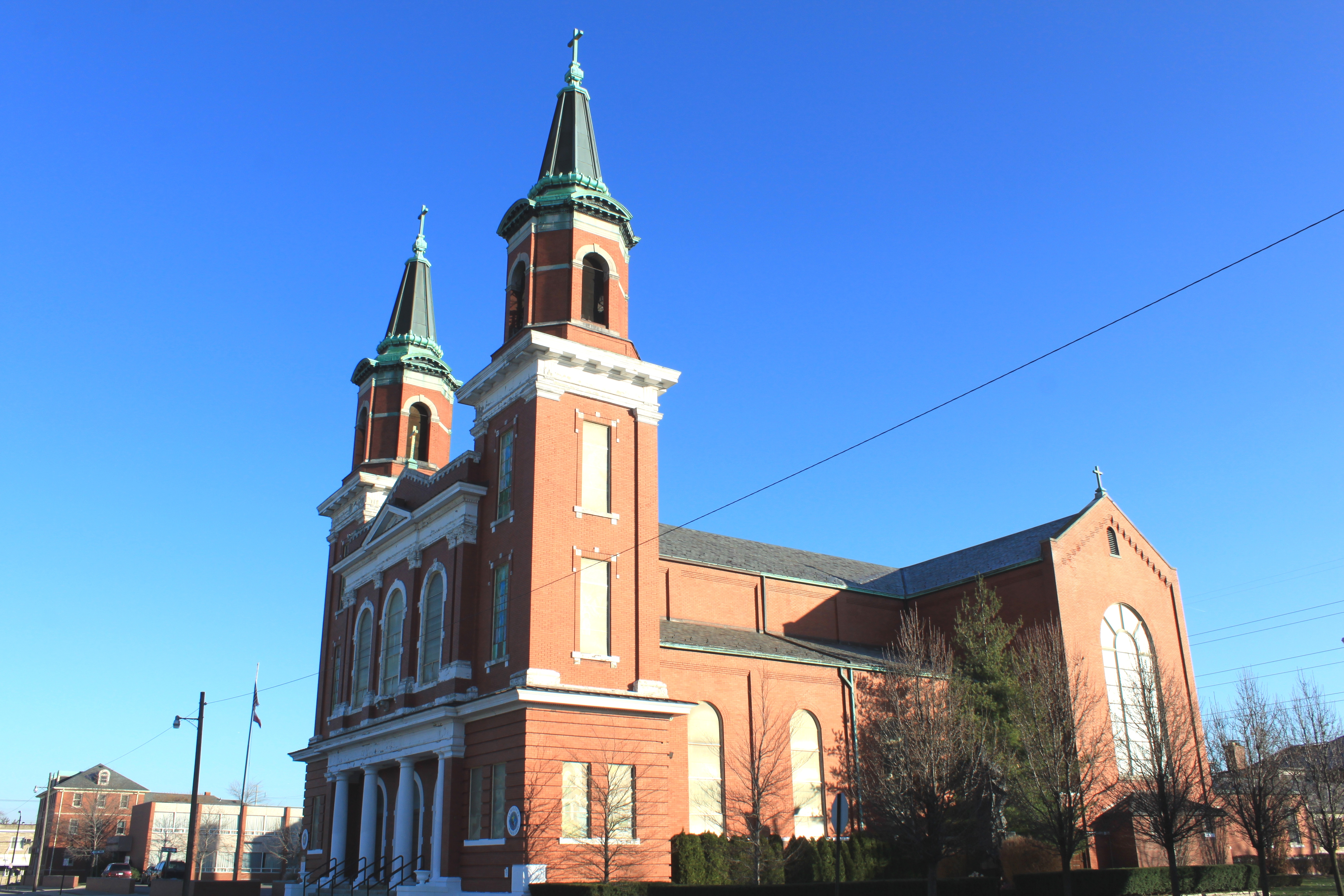
- Our Lady of Mt. Carmel Catholic Church
- Our Lady of Mount Carmel; Catholic Church
- 42°12′22″N 83°09′53″W
- Location: Wyandotte, Michigan
- Country: United States
- Denomination: Roman Catholic
- Website: Parish website

History
- Founder: Polish Immigrants
- Dedication: Our Lady of Mount Carmel
- Dedicated: May 9, 1916
- Consecrated: June 4, 1915

Architecture
- Functional status: Active
- Heritage designation: Polish
- Architect: Mr. Harry Rill
- Architectural type: Church
- Style: Italian Renaissance
- Construction cost: $70,000

Specifications
- Capacity: 900

Administration
- Archdiocese: Detroit
- Parish: Our Lady of Mount Carmel (1899–2013); Our Lady of the Scapular (2013 – Present)

Clergy
- Archbishop: The Most Rev. Edward Weisenburger
- Pastor(s): Rev. Brendan McCarrick, SAC

Our Lady of Mount Carmel Church (Polish: Kościół Matki Bożej Szkaplerznej) is located at 976 Pope John Paul II Ave. in the Detroit suburb of Wyandotte, Michigan. Following a parish merger on August 1, 2013, Our Lady of Mount Carmel Church serves the Roman Catholic Polish Personal Parish of Our Lady of the Scapular. This merger united the Wyandotte Polish Personal Parishes of Our Lady of Mount Carmel (established in 1899) and St. Stanislaus Kostka (founded in 1914). Architecturally, the church is a stunning representation of the “Polish Cathedral style,”characterized by its grand scale and opulence, all beautifully encapsulated within an Italian Renaissance-style design.

== Parish History ==
=== St. Stanislaus Kostka Society (1870) ===
Polish settlement in Wyandotte began with Anthony Zynger (Michael Singer), who emigrated after the Austro-Prussian War of 1866. He found work in a local factory, paving the way for others. Two years later, Anthony Lesczynski joined him, eventually opening a grocery store at Oak and 4th Streets. This store became a hub for the Polish community, and hosted a Catholic mission led by Rev. Xavier Szulak, S.J. in 1870. Inspired from the mission, Lesczynski founded the St. Stanislaus Kostka Society on November 22, 1870, which quickly grew to 37 members. Some of the other charter members were: Jacob Ignasiak, Francis Michalak, Walenty Szczepaniak, Jacob Sikorski, M. Hamernick, J. Jawek, Walenty Belawski, Wojciech Loziniecki, A. Grzegoszewski, Bronislaw Szwajkowski, Stanislaw Melin, M. Osowski, Francis Mowinski, Francis Balowski, Joseph Berna, Peter Rusztondek, and P. Kaczur. Zynger and Lesczynski represented the Society during the dedication of St. Albertus Church in 1872, Michigan's first Polish parish.

In 1875, Wyandotte's labor class faced a severe but temporary economic depression, causing many families to leave in search of better opportunities. Two years later, new immigrants arrived, but their stay was short-lived due to deteriorating living conditions. As a result, many relocated to Detroit, leading to the dissolution of the Society due to lack of membership. However, the Society was revived in 1888 by Francis Michalak, who was elected president by 47 new members. This marked a new beginning for the Polish community in Wyandotte. The Board of Directors consisted of: Francis Michalak, President; Joseph Kasprzyk, Vice-President; Stephan Zalewski, Secretary; M. Ozowski, Cashier; and Martin Grabarkiewicz, Cashier Protector.

The Society initially received sacraments at the German church of St. Joseph in Wyandotte. However, due to ethnic discrimination, they later moved to the Irish church of St. Patrick in Wyandotte. To cater to their spiritual needs, The Rev. Vitold Buchaczkowski from the Polish Seminary in Detroit visited monthly. A notable tradition was an annual indulgence granted to the members on Easter Sunday and the feast day of St. Stanislaus Kostka.

Between 1888 and 1898, 150 families from the Society relocated west of Wyandotte, beyond the railroad tracks. This new settlement became known within Wyandotte as New Jerusalem. The Polish community continued to grow, eventually incorporating as the Village of Glenwood in 1900. On July 16, 1899, the Feast of Our Lady of Mount Carmel, the Society members cast their votes to establish their own parish and form a building committee in Glenwood. This would provide a place where Polish-speaking residents could receive spiritual guidance in their native language, pending approval from the Bishop of Detroit. The Committeemen were: Martin Grabarkiewicz, Thomas Biniasz, Michael Sawinski, Frank Lybik, Martin Ignasiak, and Michael Dolinski.

The building committee's first order of business was securing land for the new parish. Fortunately, the Welch Brother's Realty Company of Detroit made a generous donation of eight lots on Superior and Pulaski Boulevard (now 10th Street). On September 8, 1899, Most Rev. Bishop John Samuel Foley gave his seal of approval by personally inspecting the site and greenlighting construction of a multi-purpose church and school building.

=== Our Lady of Mount Carmel Parish (1899–2013) ===
On September 18, 1899, Bishop Foley appointed Rev. Bernard Zmijewski as the new pastor. As the church was still in its planning phase, Fr. Zmijewski held temporary services at St. Patrick's Church. The founding parishioners wanted to name the parish after Our Lady of Mount Carmel because it was on that day the building committee was established. They voted to name the parish with a folk title of "Our Lady of the Scapular," but Bishop Foley opted for the more formal "Our Lady of Mount Carmel." Despite the official name, the parishioners have always affectionately referred to it by the Polish name "Szkaplerznej" or "Scapular," a tradition that dates back to the parish's inception.

A significant milestone was reached on December 3, 1899, with the laying of the cornerstone for the combination church and school. The completed structure was formally dedicated on July 8, 1900. Rev. John Moneta, a professor from SS. Cyril and Methodius Polish Seminary in Detroit, delivered a poignant homily. The ceremony was further enriched by the choir from St. Josaphat's Church in Detroit, skillfully directed by Zygmunt Kadlubowski.

Fr. Zmijewski made a heartfelt appeal to Mother Cajetan, Mother Provincial of the Felician Sisters in Detroit, to have the sisters oversee the school. His request was granted, and in September 1901, the Felician Sisters launched Our Lady of Mount Carmel School by opening two classrooms in the basement for first and second-grade students. Enrollment grew rapidly, with 113 boys and girls attending the school by the following year. The sisters dedicated themselves to their teaching ministry, living in the school for over 15 years until a convent was finally built.

The total cost of the building reached $26,961.15. To cover this expense, funds were gathered from various sources. Donations totaled $7,063.69, while a private bank loan of $15,000 was secured. Additionally, Fr. Zmijewski personally lent $5,000 to support the project.

Fr. Zmijewski's contributions extended beyond financial support. Using his own funds, he built a rectory on Pulaski Boulevard. He also established a library, which initially housed 500 Polish and English books. Furthermore, Fr. Zmijewski played a key role in the incorporation of the Village of Glenwood into the City of Wyandotte.

Tensions rose between Fr. Zmijewski and the parish committee in 1906, eventually grabbing the attention of Bishop Foley. To ease the friction, Bishop Foley intervened, proclaiming a temporary cooling-off period. On February 18, 1906, he closed the parish and relieved Fr. Zmijewski of his pastoral duties. The parish reopened on March 19, 1906, under the administration of Rev. Francis Sajecki. However, his tenure was cut short due to poor health, and he died just a week later at the age of 33. Rev. Maruszczyk took over as administrator until April 26, 1906.

On April 27, 1906, Bishop Foley appointed Rev. Joseph Lempka as the new pastor. Fr. Lempka's tenure was dominated by the parish's ongoing debt struggles. One of his notable achievements was building a new rectory for $5,000, as the existing one was owned by Fr. Zmijewski. The old rectory on 10th Street was eventually sold to the parish and converted into an infirmary for the Felician Sisters, who had fallen ill during a tuberculosis epidemic. The sisters who died were laid to rest in Mount Carmel Cemetery. The 20 sisters buried there were only in their early twenties.

Bishop Foley appointed Rev. Constantine Dziuk as pastor in 1909. During his tenure, Fr. Dziuk recognized the need to expand the parish grounds and took proactive steps. He purchased adjacent vacant property, significantly enhancing the parish's holdings. However, his time at the parish was limited. In July 1911, Fr. Dziuk was reassigned to Detroit, where he played a pivotal role in establishing the new Assumption of the Blessed Virgin Mary Parish on the city's west side.

Bishop Foley appointed Rev. Alexander Grudzinski as pastor in 1911. A significant milestone was reached on May 9, 1915, when the cornerstone for the current church was laid and consecrated by The Most Rev. Edward Kelly. The church dedication took place on June 4, 1916. During his tenure, Fr. Grudzinski oversaw the construction of a convent for the Felician Sisters, which was completed in 1916. Following the new church's dedication, the original church was converted for exclusive use as a school, with additions made to the building.

In 1918, The Most Rev. Michael Gallagher appointed The Rt. Rev. Adalbert Zadala as pastor, a position he held for just one year.

In 1919, Bishop Gallagher appointed Rev. Maximilian Gannas as pastor, a role he held for one year. During his brief tenure, Fr. Gannas made a lasting impact by establishing a parish Boy Scout group.

Bishop Gallagher appointed Rev. Leon Jarecki as pastor in October 1920. Fr. Jarecki's life was cut short when he was shot by an unknown assailant on April 7, 1921, while answering the rectory door. He succumbed to his injuries en route to the John F. Eilbert Memorial Hospital in Wyandotte. The community was deeply shaken by his death, and an estimated 5,000 people attended the Pontifical Requiem Mass which was personally celebrated by Bishop Gallagher and where about two hundred and fifty priests from across the United States sat in choir. A solemn procession escorted his body to Mount Carmel Cemetery. During his tenure, Fr. Jarecki had also blessed the three church bells still in use today, naming them St. Stanislaus Kostka, The Holy Angels, and Our Lady Queen of Poland.

Bishop Gallagher appointed Rev. Peter Kruszka as pastor in 1921. During his tenure, Fr. Kruszka implemented several significant projects. He oversaw the construction of an addition to the parish elementary school, installed a heating plant, and expanded the front of the Felician Sisters' convent. One of his most notable achievements was establishing Our Lady of Mount Carmel High School, which welcomed its first class in September 1928 under the direction of the Felician Sisters.

In 1938, Fr. Kruszka's declining health prompted him to take a sabbatical. Archbishop Gallagher then appointed Rev. Boleslaus Parzych as administrator in June 1938. During his administration, Fr. Parzych oversaw several key projects, including the painting of the elementary school building's interior and exterior, the church roof, and negotiating a reduced interest rate on the parish debt. Fr. Kruszka's health never recovered, and he died on March 26, 1939.

The Most Rev. Edward Mooney appointed Rev. Ladislaus Krych as pastor on June 10, 1939. During his tenure, Fr. Krych implemented various initiatives. In 1940, he established a school band and orchestra, generously providing instruments and uniforms from his personal funds. A kindergarten class was added to the school in 1941. The following year, Fr. Krych embarked on a comprehensive church remodeling project. This included covering the deteriorating masonry with lead, resetting and encasing the windows, installing new ventilation, rewiring, and equipping the church with modern lighting. The church organ was also repaired and rebuilt. In January 1942, the church's interior underwent a thorough cleaning and repainting, costing $9,000. The parish community came together to support these renovations. The Third Order of St. Francis and the Wyandotte Chapter of the Polish National Alliance donated a new communion rail. Benefactors purchased the high altar, while the Altar Society bought the tabernacle and flower vases. Individual parishioners generously donated various items, including a monstrance, vestments, a pulpit, confessionals, and altar linens. The altar boys collectively purchased the shrine of Our Lady of Perpetual Help.

The parish continued to undergo improvements in 1943 and 1944, with renovations made to the Felician Sisters' convent, school buildings, and church. In 1945, the church's exterior was restored, including washing, repairs, and painting the brick. A significant milestone was achieved on January 15, 1946, when the parish debt of $5,000 was fully paid off, marking the first time in the parish's history that it was debt-free. Further enhancements were made in 1947, including new roofs for the school buildings, a new boiler for the heating plant, an automated bell-ringing system for the church, and the addition of amplifiers. In 1948, the parish acquired a strip of land along Electric Street, which would eventually be used for expansion after the street was closed. The following year, in 1949, the church underwent another restoration, costing $5,180, and the school's interior was repainted.

In 1950, the parish upgraded its infrastructure by installing asphalt pavement between the church and school buildings. The following year, was a triumphant one for the parish's athletic teams, as they won the Catholic and Parochial City Football Championship. To commemorate this achievement and support the athletes, parishioners came together to build a field house addition to the high school. This new facility included a locker room, two dressing rooms, an equipment room, a utility room, and toilet facilities, providing a welcoming space for the athletes.

A significant milestone was reached on August 24, 1951, with the laying of the cornerstone for the current rectory. That same year, Fr. Krych launched an appeal for new church pews. In response, individual parishioners generously purchased pews, and memorial plates were placed on each one to commemorate their donations. The new pews were ordered in July 1953 and installed in September of the same year.

Tragedy struck on March 17, 1956, when Fr. Krych suffered a fatal heart attack. His passing sent shockwaves throughout the City of Wyandotte, where he was deeply respected. Thousands mourned the loss of this beloved priest, whose dedication and service had left an indelible mark on the community.

The Most Rev. John Dearden appointed Rev. Jerome Juchniewicz as pastor in June 1956. During his tenure, Fr. Juchniewicz oversaw a notable restoration project in 1960. He had the tarnished statue of Our Lady of Mount Carmel refurbished and relocated to a ground platform at the side of the church, on the corner of 10th and Superior Blvd. The original niche on the church facade was removed and replaced with a stained glass window of Our Lady of Mount Carmel, designed to harmonize with the existing windows throughout the church. Fr. Juchniewicz's life ended when he suffered a fatal heart attack on September 13, 1963, dying at Wyandotte General Hospital.

Archbishop Dearden appointed Rev. Venanty Szymanski as pastor in September 1963. That same year, the Archdiocese of Detroit faced a severe financial crisis, prompting consideration of consolidating high schools across various parishes. Our Lady of Mount Carmel Parish was advised to merge with neighboring Wyandotte parishes – St. Joseph, St. Patrick, St. Helena, St. Stanislaus Kostka, and St. Elizabeth – to establish Gabriel Richard Catholic High School. However, after a public meeting, the parishioners of Our Lady of Mount Carmel overwhelmingly voted to maintain the independence of Our Lady of Mount Carmel High School, opting out of the consolidation effort. In the late 1960s, the parish faced another consolidation proposal, this time to merge elementary schools with the Wyandotte parishes, aiming to establish Wyandotte Catholic Consolidated School. However, Our Lady of Mount Carmel Parish once again opted to maintain its independence, declining the consolidation offer. Preserving the Polish Catholic heritage was a top priority for the parish. By maintaining control over their schools, they ensured that their children would continue to receive formal instruction in their rich culture, passing it down to future generations.

In 1964, Fr. Szymanski initiated plans for constructing a new elementary school building. The project gained momentum in 1965, when a ceremonial groundbreaking ceremony took place, led by Fr. Szymanski. The event marked the beginning of construction on the state-of-the-art facility, designed to accommodate 600 students. On October 30, 1966, the cornerstone of the new elementary school was formally blessed, signifying a major milestone in the project's completion.

Fr. Szymanski suffered two strokes in 1967, significantly impacting his health. Despite his ongoing rehabilitation, the parish continued to thrive under the diligent care of his assistant, Rev. Stanley Redwick. However, in July 1971, Fr. Redwick was reassigned to serve as pastor at St. Stanislaus Parish in Detroit. Due to his lingering health issues, Fr. Szymanski formally resigned as pastor in May 1972. Archbishop Dearden then appointed Rev. Stanley Konopka as parish administrator to ensure the continued well-being of the parish.

Archbishop Dearden appointed Rev. Stanley Redwick as pastor in June 1972. That same year, Fr. Redwick and hundreds of dedicated parishioners worked tirelessly to organize the parish's first festival, held on the weekend before Labor Day. The event proved to be a resounding success, generating a profit of $85,000. This annual festival has since become a beloved tradition.

During his tenure, Fr. Redwick oversaw numerous renovations to the school buildings and church. One notable project was the modernization of the high school kitchen, transforming it into a well-equipped facility. The renovated space not only serves as a dining area but also features an adjoining Social Room, perfect for hosting society meetings and gatherings.

In 1974, Fr. Redwick embarked on an ambitious project to renovate the church, both inside and out. The extensive project included repainting the interior, installing a new slate roof, and carefully resetting the stunning stained glass windows. Additional remodeling work was also undertaken to enhance the overall integrity of the church. After nearly two decades of dedicated service, Fr. Redwick tendered his resignation in 1993, citing declining health.

The Most Rev. Adam Maida appointed Rev. Walter Ptak as pastor on March 7, 1994. A monument honoring Pope John Paul II was dedicated on October 31, 2004, in the Peace Garden beside the church. The monument was sculpted by Czesław Dźwigaj and dedicated by Adam Cardinal Maida

== Schools ==
- Our Lady of Mount Carmel Elementary School
- Our Lady of Mount Carmel High School

== See also ==
- Polish Cathedral style
