= Puntarenas Cathedral =

Coordinates: 9.9776°N 84.8348°W

Our Lady of Mount Carmel Cathedral
- Catedral de Nuestra Señora del Carmen
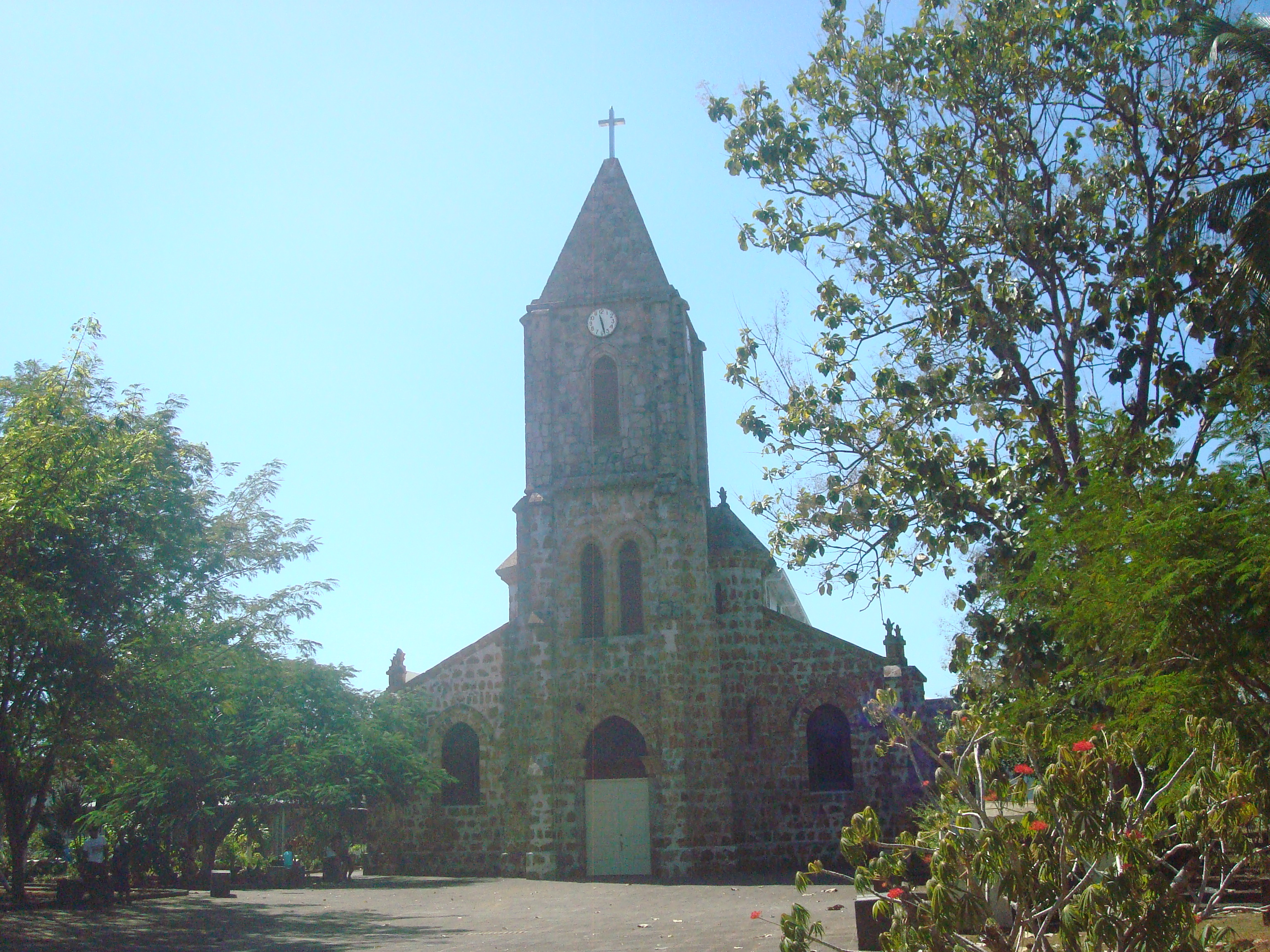
- Our Lady of Mount Carmel Cathedral
- Location: Puntarenas
- Country: Costa Rica
- Denomination: Roman Catholic Church

The Our Lady of Mount Carmel Cathedral (Spanish: Catedral de Nuestra Señora del Carmen) or Puntarenas Cathedral is a temple of the Roman Catholic church located in the city of Puntarenas canton of Puntarenas, in Costa Rica.

Built in 1902, it has the distinction of being built with the facade to the east. It was built with stone and mortar and has brick floor. It is the seat of the Roman Catholic Diocese of Puntarenas (Dioecesis Puntarenensis). As its name indicates its patron saint is the Virgin Mary in her title of Our Lady of Mount Carmel (Nuestra Señora del Monte Carmelo).

It has its origins in the parish of Puntarenas founded in 1850. It was elevated to cathedral on April 27, 1998 after the papal bull "Sacrorum Antistites".

== See also ==
- Catholic Church in Costa Rica
