= Chiesa del Carmine, Carrara =

Building in Tuscany, Italy

Coordinates: 44.0785°N 10.0987°E

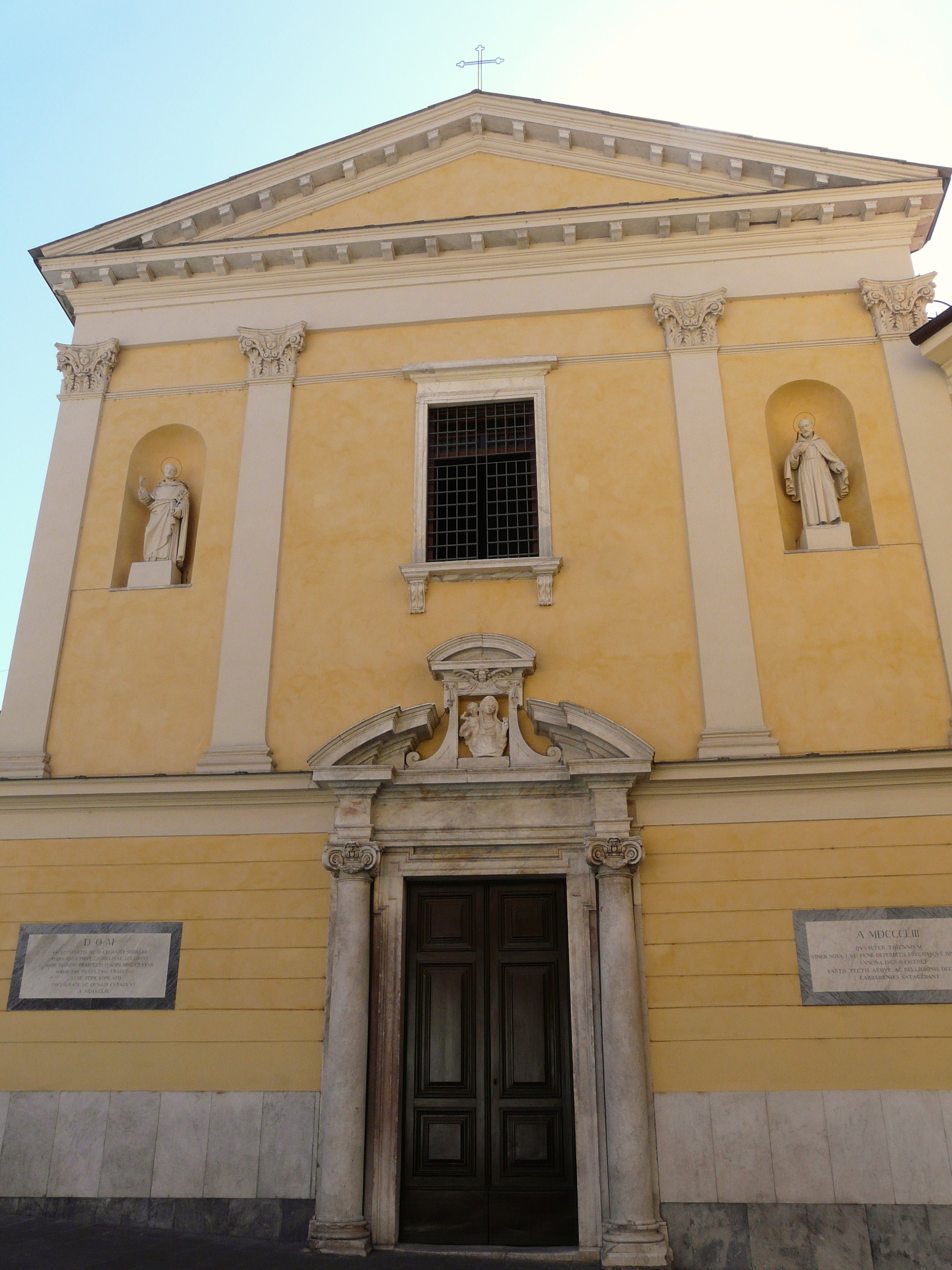
Front facade, 2011

Carmine Church is a Roman Catholic building which is located on via Loris Giorgi (formerly via Alberica) in Carrara.

== History ==
The church began construction in the 16th century, but was completed in Baroque style, modified by style of the Ligurian region. On the portal is a sculpture of Madonna and Child, attributed to Bartolomé Ordóñez (1515–1520). The church houses a painting depicting a Madonna del Carmine (Our Lady of Mount Carmel, 16th century), attributed to Domenico Fiasella. It also contains an altar dedicated to Saint Mary Magdalene de' Pazzi, attributed to Giovanni Lazzoni and built in 1675 at the expense of Count Francesco Maria Diana.
