= Chiesa del Carmine, Messina =

Roman Catholic church in Sicily, Italy

Coordinates: 38.1884°N 15.5510°E

The "Sanctuary of Our Lady of Mount Carmel", better known as Carmine Church, is a Roman Catholic church in Via Porta Imperiale, Messina, Sicily. It replaces the former church, which was razed by the 1908 Messina earthquake. Located close to the Tribunal, the Carmine Church was rebuilt in 1930 in the eighteenth century Baroque or Rococo style. Designed by the architect Cesare Bazzani, the church was reconsecrated on July 15, 1931.

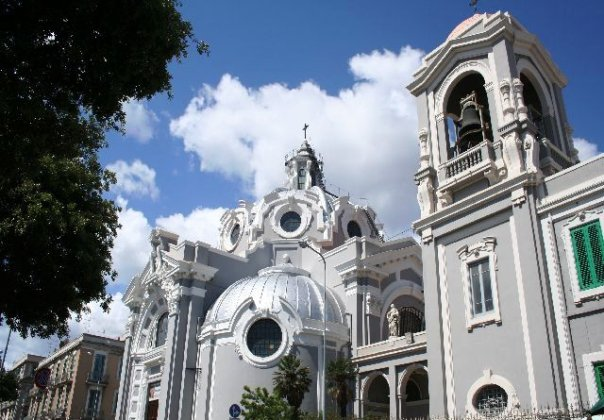
Carmine Church of Messina and Carmelite Convent

== The Carmelites in Messina ==
The religious Carmelites arrived from the Holy Land in Messina probably not later than 1238 and settled down by the river San Michele, two miles from the city. There, they built their first convent with its church, which they called "Santa Maria del Carmelo". That place, for the hermit life lived by the brothers, was then commonly called 'Ritiro' ('Withdrawal') name that then took all the area. The pressures of the faithful people that flocked, attracted by the admirable life of those monks, induced the Carmelites to relocate and move almost at the mouth of that river San Michele. However, being the second mansion infested with malaria and too exposed to the depredations of pirates and wars, in 1292 the brothers moved to Via degli Argentieri, between the current Via Garibaldi and Via Cavour. But also in this convent, their presence did not last long because it was too close to the cathedral and those priests considered their masses "disturbed".

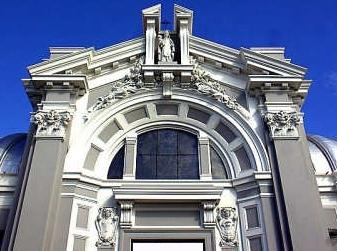
The facade of the church

The brothers then, "pro bono Pacis," moved in April 1304 for the fourth time to a new convent, located in Contrada Pozzo Leone (dedicated to Pope Leo II, born in Messina by tradition) where they occupied the church of St. Cataldo located in the area of the current theatre "Vittorio Emanuele", overlooking Via Cavour. On 5 February 1783, when the church, and all its internal works and tombs, were completely destroyed. The new headquarters, "Carmine Maggiore" stood on the ancient Via Università, including the current Via San Filippo Bianchi and Via della Zecca.

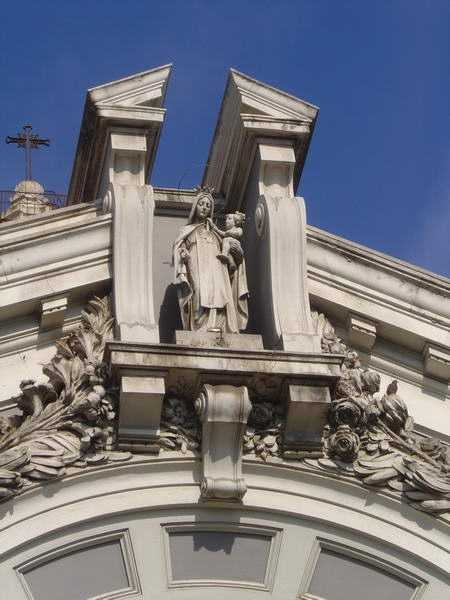
The statue dedicated to Our Lady of Mount Carmel

The church of the Carmine, as before, had a unique nave and was lavishly embellished in a Baroque style, with frescoes and oil paintings by Giovanni Tuccari. He had five altars: the main one was dedicated to Our Lady of Mount Carmel, with a painting on wood always considered by Polidoro da Caravaggio, covered with silver-stained leaving visible only the Madonna's face (you can see it in the current Regional Museum), one was dedicated to St Albert of Trapani and was ornamented with four silver "plates" depicting the life of the saint (stored in current vestry until 1981 when they were stolen). On 28 December 1908 a catastrophic earthquake struck Messina. The Hon. Mirabello, then Minister of the Navy, ruthless anti-clerical, in an interview in early January 1909, accused the clergy of total absenteeism in the earthquake country. To repair this slander, Honorable Joseph Toscano wrote in the newspaper "Il Risveglio": «Simply for the truth, the undersigned Giuseppe Toscano, former municipal councilor of the hapless Messina testify that immediately following the disaster, I met with three friars of the convent of the Carmine, almost naked, already worked to rescue the buried alive and, although they also just escaped the wreckage and free of any instrument, by sheer force of their arms drew to rescue as many as they could. I gave to them some clothing that I could draw from my house, one room was not completely knocked down, and sat with them at the pitiful work».

Sensing devotion to the Holy Virgin of Carmel, the Archbishop of Messina, D'Arrigo, wanted to entrust the Carmelites one of the first shack-churches built after the disaster, in Via Salandra. At that stood near the church of SS. Lawrence and Anne, the oldest parish in the city, which could include in its records the name of Canon St. Annibale Maria Di Francia, baptized there 7 July 1851. However, the parish priest, old and shabby, needed help. The Archbishop D'Arrigo asked Father Alessi, the prior of the convent, to lend, and the pastor, to concede that his parish would pass to the Carmelites at his death, which occurred in October 1918. In fact in 1926, thanks to the paternal involvement of Archbishop Angelo Paino, the successor of D'Arrigo, the project was obtained for the new church and convent by the renowned architect Cesare Bazzani. The cornerstone that took place on 17 July of that year, after four years, the new convent stood and was opened 3 June 1930. After one year, the new church of the Carmine was completed. On 15 July 1931, the statue of the Virgin of Carmel made its triumphal entry, greeted fondly by Messina people.

== The Church today ==
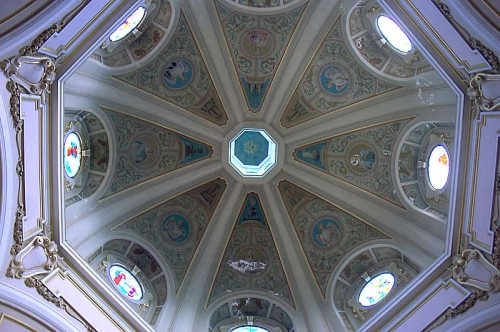
Inside of the dome

The interior, in the shape of a Greek cross with side chapels, is decorated with polychrome marble and pink marble columns topped with carved capitals. The dome of the church, octagonal, has a circular window on each side and is surmounted by a square lantern. The central compartment has an octagonal shape and is covered by a dome that is in line with Via Nicola Fabrizi and Corso Cavour, to whom all the building, seen from a distance, gives the impression of a terminal point. The church has seven chapels. On the main altar is an eighteenth-century statue depicting the Madonna of Carmel, with the Infant Jesus in her arms, in the act of turning the holy scapular to St. Simon Stock.

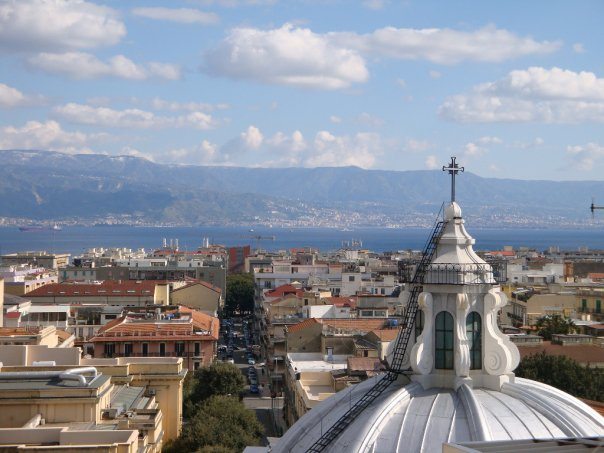
Church Dome

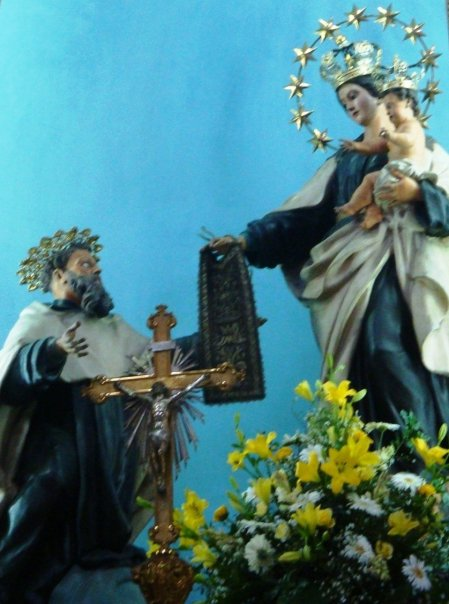
Statues of Our Lady of Mount Carmel and St. Simon Stock

- Chapel of St. Heart: it is located in the crossing of the church on the left of the main altar. The niche contains a statue of St. Heart.
- Chapel of St. Crucifix: it depicts Mount Calvary, the cross on which Jesus stands against a background of dark clouds that hint of darkness that have arisen time of his death. Sitting at the foot is the Mother of Sorrows with his chest pierced by a sword.
- Chapel of Our Lady of Lourdes it is from right beside the main altar. In a cave that seems to remember that French is the wooden statue of Our Lady of Lourdes natural high that comes from the ancient church-cabin (after the earthquake stood at Via La Farina). At his feet there is a small Bernadet.
- Chapel of St. Anne: the wooden statue of St. Anne holds an open book with the biblical passage "Rorate coeli et desuper nubes pluvant iustum" (Drop down dew, ye heavens, from above the clouds rain down the Just). The Santa was, along with St. Lawrence, until 1988, co-owner of the parish that, on that occasion, changed its name to "Santa Maria del Carmine."
- Chapel of St. Albert of the Abbots: the wooden statue of Albert of Trapani, one of the patrons of Messina, natural height, holding in her arms the Divine Little Child on the right, with the symbolic lily and a book on the left: the symbols of his candor and scrupulous observance of the Rule. It lies on a wooden base, on which is a fluttering ribbon with the inscription "Civitas Messana Gaude", which invites the city of Messina to enjoy having such a wonderful protector. Behind the saint's feet you can see the stern and the bow of the historic "Vascelluzzo", a vessel that commemorates the liberation of the city of Messina by a severe famine, and that is carried in procession every year on the day of Corpus Domini.
- Chapel of Saint Lucy: it recalls the church "Santa Lucia all'Uccellatore" which stood near the present sanctuary. Great is the devotion of Messina people for Saint Lucy and they particularly celebrate it in her feast day, 13 December.

== The Tamburini organ ==
Built by the famous company Tamburini of Crema and tested on 30 January 1954, this organ is the most practical and perfect that could be offered at that time. It has two manuals of 61 keys, a fine console, beyond the radially concave pedalboard with 32 pedals brackets, adjusted every twenty registers, 17 of which are real mechanical. It has a complex of 1,400 rods which, placed on both sides of the loft, forms a complex rich sounds. It has just been subject to a restoration.
