= Madonna del Carmine, Marsico Nuovo =

Catholic church in Potenza province, Italy

Coordinates: 40°24′57.7″N 15°44′04.4″E

The Chiesa della Madonna del Carmine is a Roman Catholic church situated on Via Raia Occidentale in Marsico Nuovo, a town within the province of Potenza, region of Basilicata, Italy.

== History ==
The church, along with the adjacent monastery of San Tommaso di Canterbury, was originally constructed between the 13th and 14th centuries. Its facade, embodying a sober neoclassical-style, features a 14th-century main portal adorned with four slender columns and a rounded marble arch. Inside, a 14th-century wooden sculpture of the Madonna and Child, attributed to Giovanni di Nola.
