= Santa Maria del Carmine, Pistoia =

Deconsecrated Roman Catholic church in Pistoia, Tuscany, Italy

Coordinates: 43°56′11″N 10°54′59″E

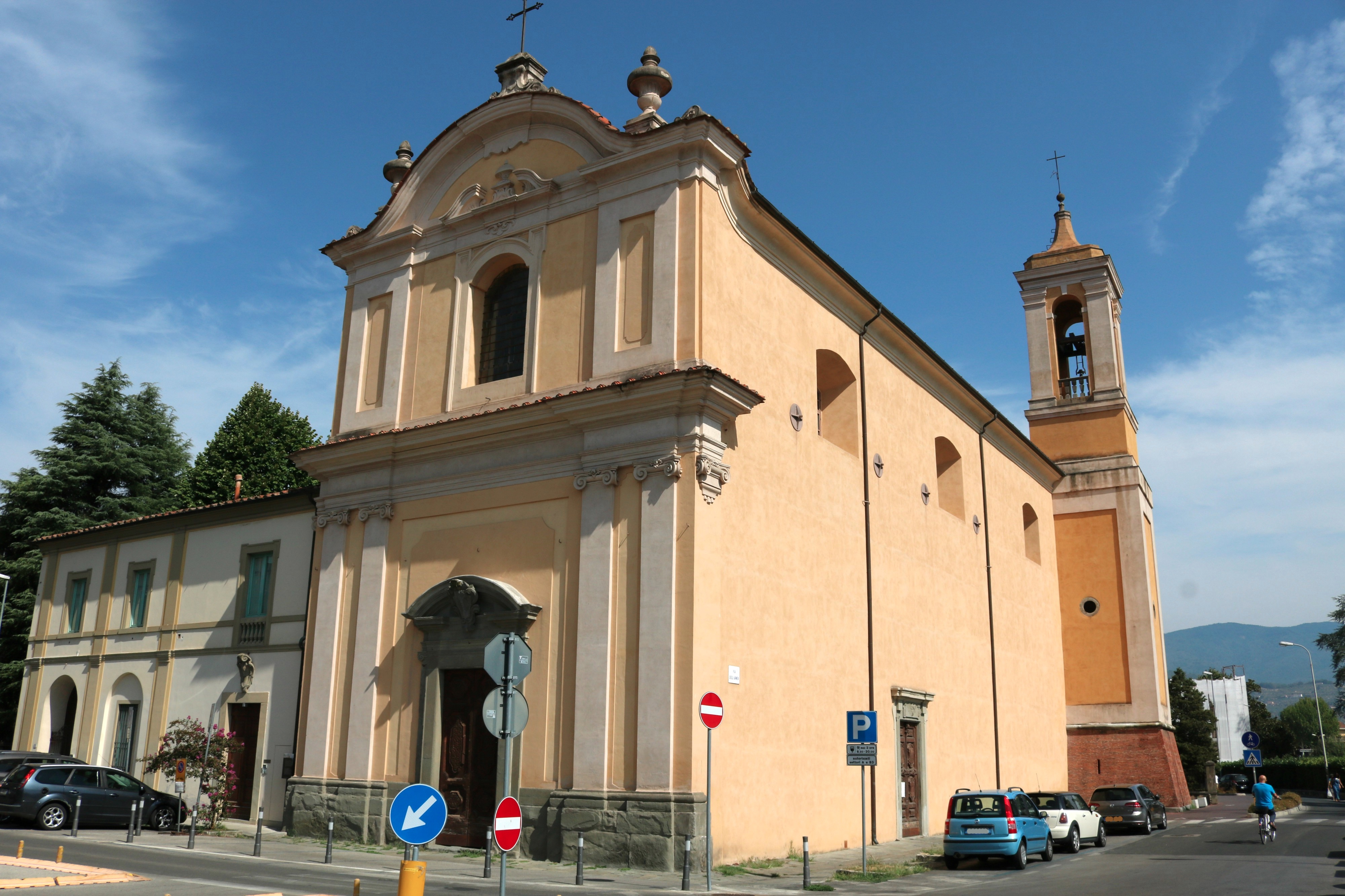
Church of Santa Maria del Carmine (Pistoia)

Santa Maria del Carmine is a Baroque-style, deconsecrated Roman Catholic church in Pistoia, region of Tuscany, Italy.

== History ==
In 1291, construction of a church and adjacent convent were completed. In the 16th century, the church was remodelled and enlarged under the designs of Antonio Arrighi, and now housing Carmelite friars from Mantua. That church was consecrated in 1565. In 1741, a further refurbishment took place, granting the church its present late Baroque structure and decoration. In the early 19th century, the by-then suppressed convent and church were granted by the Napoleonic government to the local Pistoian Academy of Sciences, Letters, and Arts. In the 21st century, the church underwent renewed restructuring.

The society maintained the church and its decorations. A survey of the church in 1821 described the following works:

- St Teresa of Avila by Ignazio Hugford for the altar of the Desideri family
- Virgin of the Carmine by Pietro Marchesini for the altar of the Chiappelli family.
- Fall of Manna in Desert by Cigoli for the main Altar
- Faith and Hope (frescoes above the Cigoli altarpiece) were by Vincenzo Meucci
- Choir frescoes with medallions by Tommaso Gherardini
- Medallions by Gherardini and Meucci
- Enthroned Madonna, Jesus, St Niccolò, and other Saints by Leonardo Malatesta for the altar of the Conversini family
