= Galleria d'Arte Moderna Palermo =

Museum in Italy

Modern Art Gallery of Palermo
- Galleria d'Arte Moderna Palermo
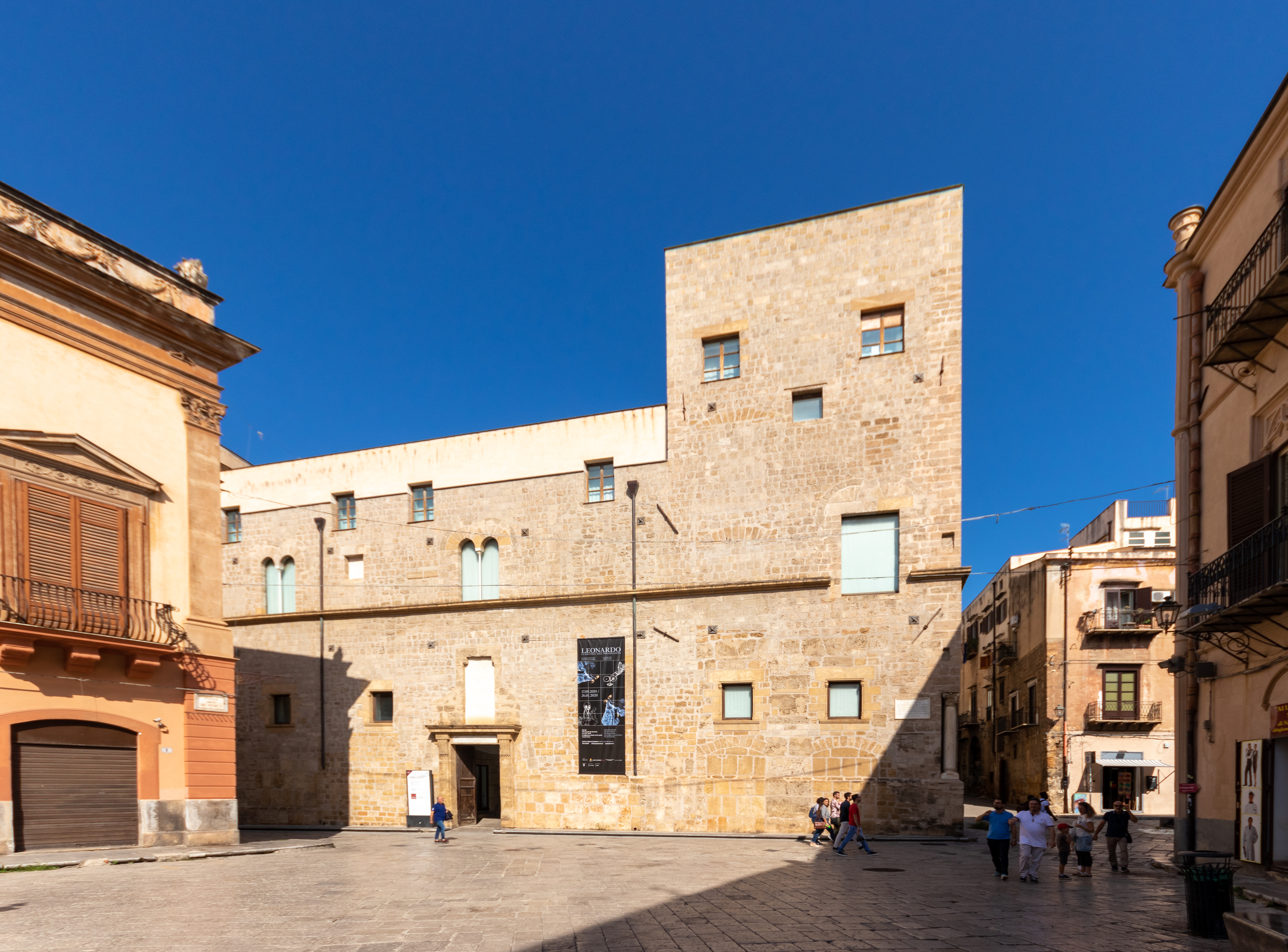
- Entrance to GAM and former Palazzo Bonet, viewed from Piazza Croce dei Vespri
- Established: 1910, present location since 2006
- Location: Via Sant'Anna #21b - Palermo, Sicily, Italy
- Coordinates: 38.1150°N 13.3659°E
- Director: Antonella Purpura
- Website: www.gampalermo.it

The Modern Art Gallery of Palermo (Italian: Galleria d'Arte Moderna Palermo) is a civic art gallery of Palermo, displaying works from the 19th until the early 20th century, located on Via Sant'Anna #21, adjacent to the church of Sant'Anna la Misericordia in the ancient quarter of the Kalsa of the city of Palermo, region of Sicily, Italy. The collections were moved to this site, consisting of the former Franciscan convent associated with Sant'Anna and the adjacent Palazzo Bonet.

== History ==
The Teatro Politeama on Piazza Ruggero Settimo, just north of the central Palermo was completed by the late 19th century, and to lure more visitors and create a cultural landmark, a painting and sculptor gallery, named after its initial patron, Empedocle Restivo, was installed in 1910 in the second floor foyer featuring mainly local contemporary talent. In 2006, it was decided to move the enlarging collection to a more central space, and the city had available the large former Franciscan convent near the church of Sant'Anna, and it adjacent former Palazzo Bonet, a former 15th-century residence.

The palazzo Bonet had been erected c. 1480 by the Catalan merchant Gaspare Bonet. In 1618, his family sold the palace to the Franciscans who made it part of their monastery. In the 18th century, earthquakes damaged the building, and refurbishments were made by the monastery. In the 19th century, part of the Convent was converted to apartments. In the 1866, the convent was suppressed, and parts were used for a school. Starting in 1996, the Municipality funded the refurbishment, creating more than 1,300 square meters of exhibition spaces, and rooms for educational activities, conference halls, library, archives, bookshop and cafeteria. The converision of the building into a museum was carried out by Tonino Martelli and Roberto Termini, with Alessandra Raso, Stefano Testa and Matteo Raso of the Cliostraat company adding to the planning for a museum. In 2006, the collection was moved from the Politeama here. The entrance and exhibition spaces are mainly housed in the former site of Palazzo Bonet.

The gallery houses works of important artists like Giovanni Boldini, Massimo Campigli, Carlo Carrà, Felice Casorati, Eustachio Catalano, Giorgio de Chirico, Ettore De Maria Bergler, Emilio Greco, Renato Guttuso, Nino Franchina, Lia Pasqualino Noto, Antonino Leto, Salvatore Lo Forte, Francesco Lo Jacono, Vincenzo Ragusa, Pippo Rizzo, Mario Rutelli, Aleardo Terzi, Onofrio Tomaselli, Mario Sironi, Franz von Stuck and Elisa Maria Boglino.

== Collections ==
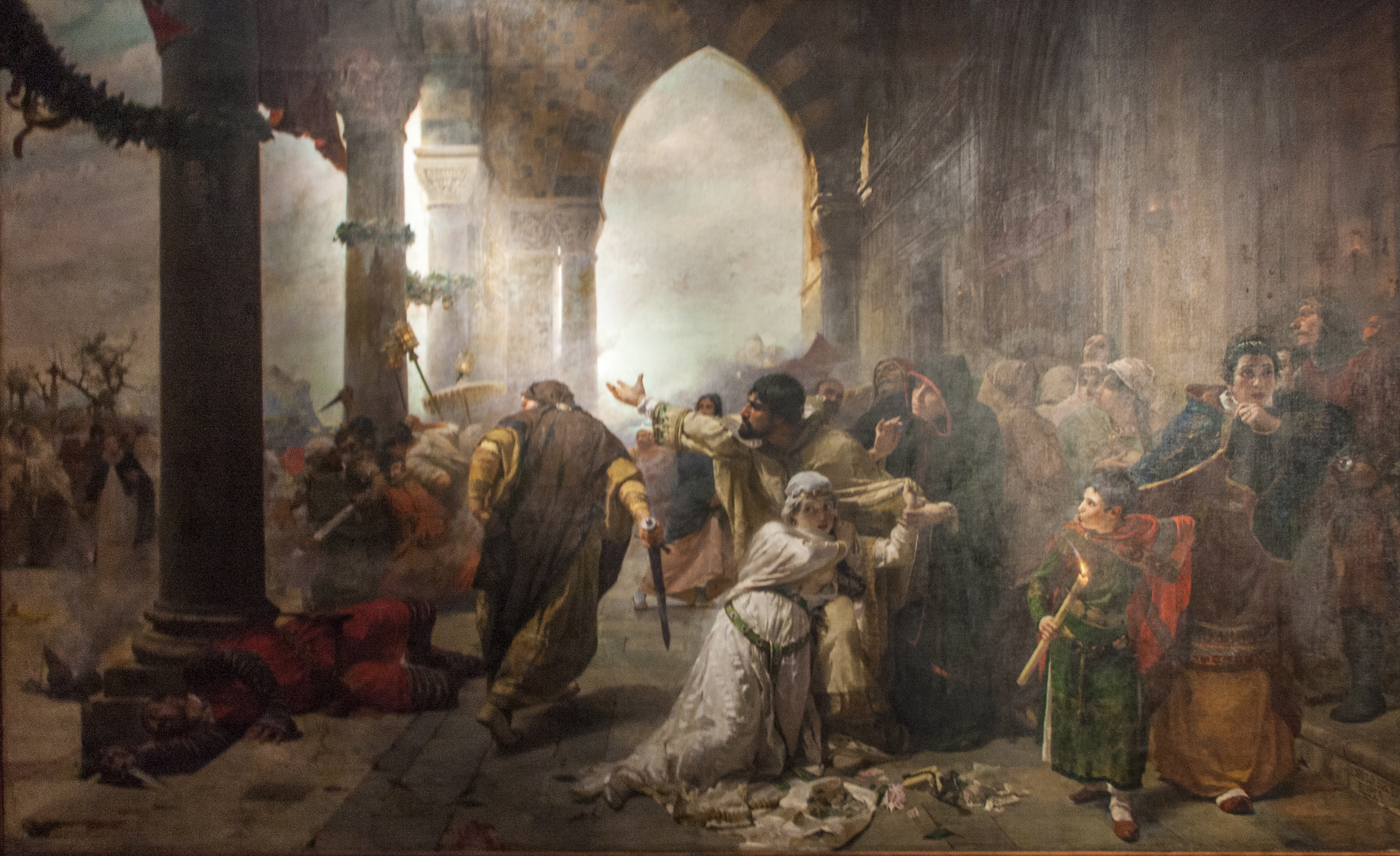
I Vespri Siciliani by Eroli

- Erulo Eroli (Roma 1854 – 1916)
  - The Sicilian Vespers, 1890–1891, oil on canvas, cm 297 × 495
- Guglielmo De Sanctis (Roma 1829 – 1911)
  - Donna Olimpia Pamphili and Innocent X with a Cardinal, 1891 circa, oil on canvas, cm 232 × 310

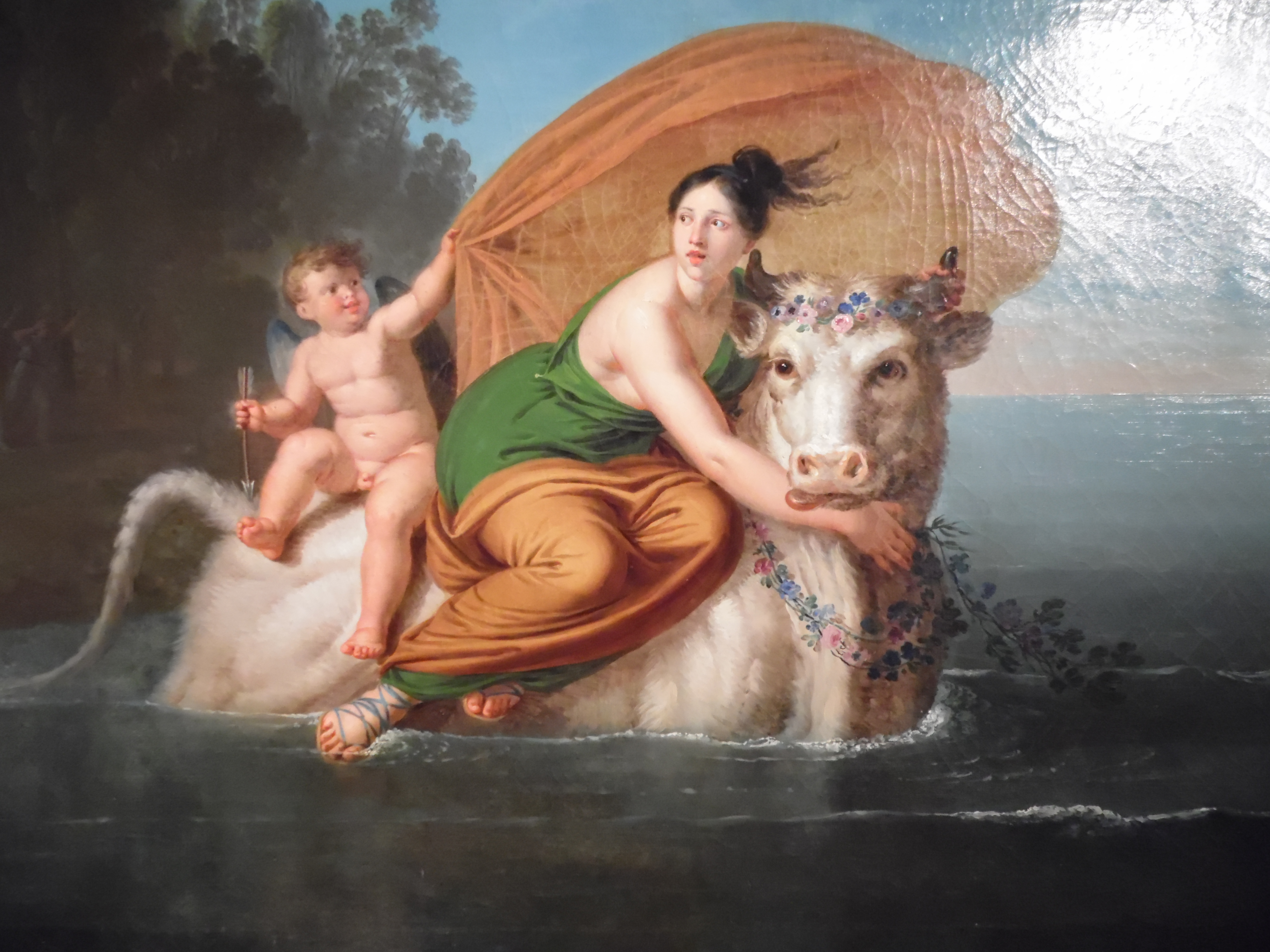
Rape of Europa by Patania

- Giuseppe Patania (Palermo 1780 – 1852)
  - Self-Portrait as a Young Man, 1807, oil on canvas, cm 82,5 × 63
  - Self-Portrait, 1820 circa, oil on canvas, cm 56 × 43,5
  - Portrait of a boy with a dog, 1830, oil on canvas, cm 51 × 42,7
  - Portrait of a girl with a dove, 1830, oil on canvas, cm 51 × 41,5
  - Portrait of an Old Priest, 1838, oil on canvas, cm 63,5 × 52
  - Venus and Adonis, 1828, oil on canvas, cm 75 × 100
  - Jupiter Kisses Io, 1828, oil on canvas, cm 75 × 100
  - Danae and the Shower of Gold, 1829, oil on canvas, cm 75,5 × 101
  - The Rape of Europa, 1828–1829, oil on canvas, cm 75 × 100
  - Danae and the Shower of Gold, 1839, oil on canvas, cm 75,5 × 101
  - The Flight of the White Queen, 1850, oil on canvas, cm 30,5 × 37
  - Mercury Taking the Infant Bacchus to Heaven, 1829, oil on canvas, cm 75 × 100,5
- Odorico Politi (Udine 1785 – Venice 1846)
  - Portrait of a Family, 1809–1812, oil on canvas, cm 73 × 60,4

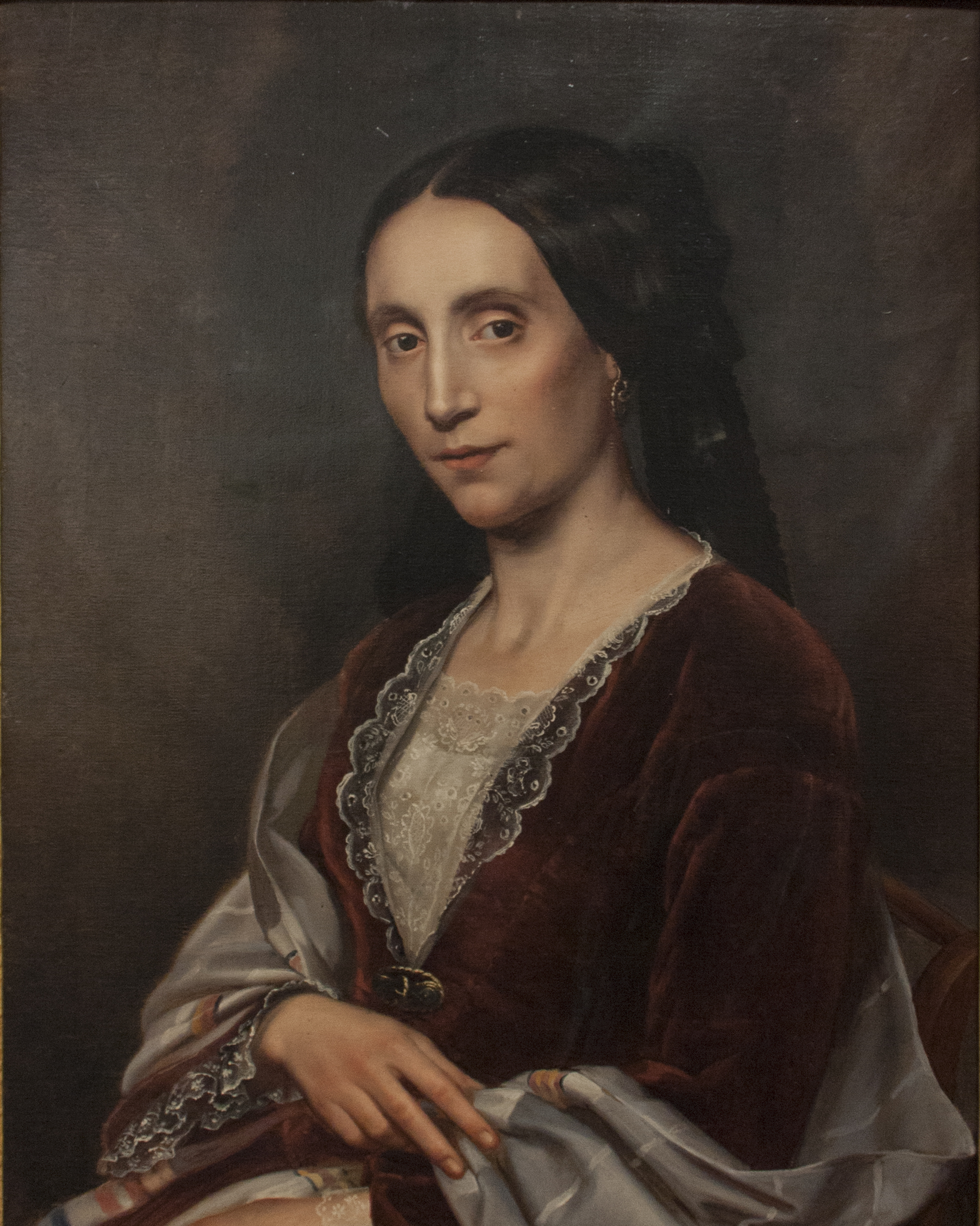
Portrait of Signora Pintacuda by Lo Forte

- Salvatore Lo Forte (Palermo 1807 – 1885)
  - Portrait of Michele Pintacuda, 1855 circa, oil on canvas, cm 71 × 56,5
  - Portrait of signora Pintacuda, 1855 circa, oil on canvas, cm 70,5 × 56,5
  - Portrait of a Young Gentleman, 1835-1845 circa, oil on canvas, cm 36, 7 × 23,5
  - Portrait of Giuseppe Garibaldi, 1870 circa, oil on canvas, cm 62 × 40
  - Portrait of Giuseppe Garibaldi, 1860, oil on panel, cm 73 × 58,5
- Benedetto Civiletti (Palermo 1845 – 1899)
  - Puttini, 1865 circa, gesso, cm 100 × 65 × 65
- Vincenzo Riolo (Palermo 1772 – 1837)
  - Psyche Transported by Zephyrs, 1829, oil on canvas, cm 76 × 60
  - Orlando Furioso, 1800-1810 circa, oil on canvas, cm 36 × 30
- Giuseppe By Giovanni (Palermo 1817 – 1898)
  - Aeneas and Dido, 1865 circa, oil on canvas, cm 52 × 65,5

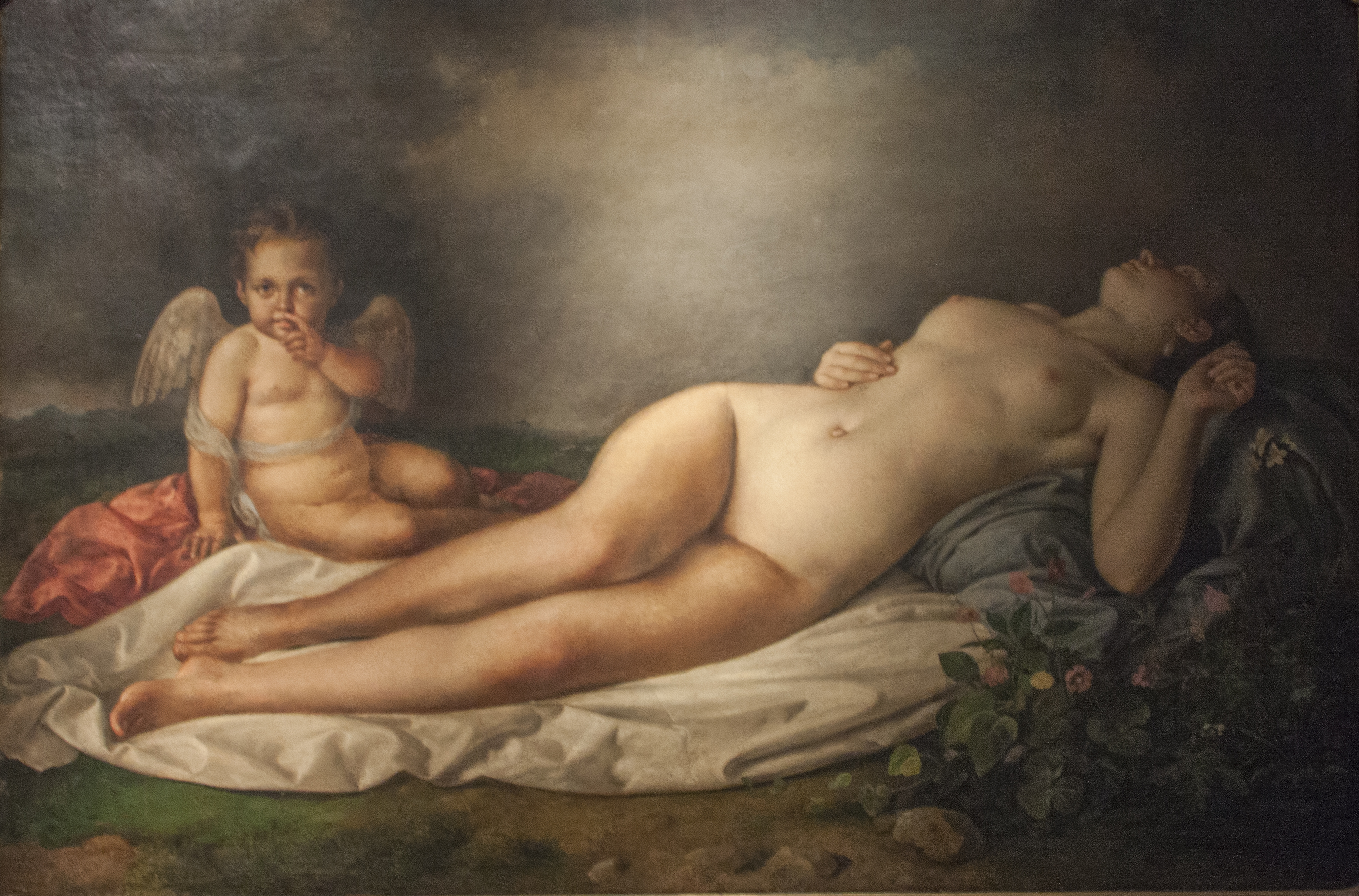
Sleeping Venus by D'Antoni

- Andrea D'Antoni (Palermo 1811 – 1868)
  - Sleeping Venus, 1840 circa, oil on canvas, cm 103 × 154
- Valerio Villareale (Palermo 1773 – 1854)
  - Dancing Bacchante, 1838, marble, h cm 210 by
- Benedetto Delisi (Palermo 1831 – 1875)
  - Christopher Columbus in Chains, 1872, marble, cm 65 × 34 × 60
  - Giuseppe Garibaldi on Horseback, 1884 circa, bronze, cm 91 × 75 × 34
- Francesco Padovano (Palermo 1842 - documentato a Palermo fino al 1915)
  - The Night of 19 July 1812 in Palermo, or the Renunciation of Sicilian Feudalism (The Abolition of 'Fidecommesso'), 1874, oil on canvas, cm 197 × 268
- Filippo Liardo (Leonforte 1834 – Asnières 1917)
  - Garibaldian Burial, 1862–1864, oil on canvas, cm 248 × 171
- Onofrio Tomaselli (Bagheria 1866 – Palermo 1956)

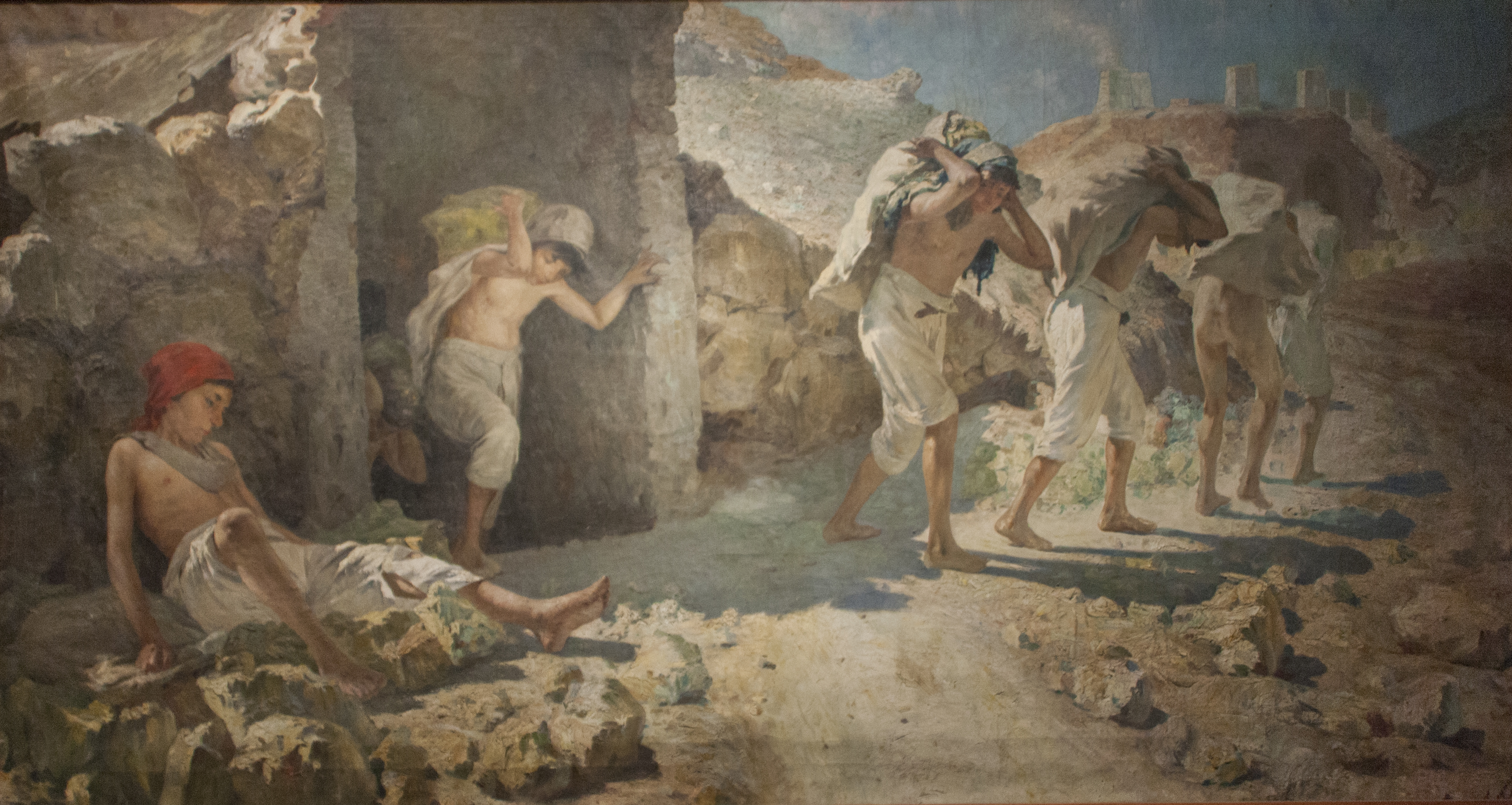
I Carusi by Tomaselli

  - The Miner Boys (I Carusi), circa 1905, oil on canvas, cm 184 × 333,5
  - A Life, 1900 circa, oil on canvas, cm 71 × 141
  - Reminiscence, 1899 circa, pastel on card, cm. 85 × 73
  - Portrait of Francesco Lojacono, 1930 circa, oil on canvas, cm 50,5 × 44
- Archimede Campini (Forlì 1884 – Palermo 1950)
  - Bust of Francesco Lojacono, 1920 circa, gesso, cm 77 × 66 × 44

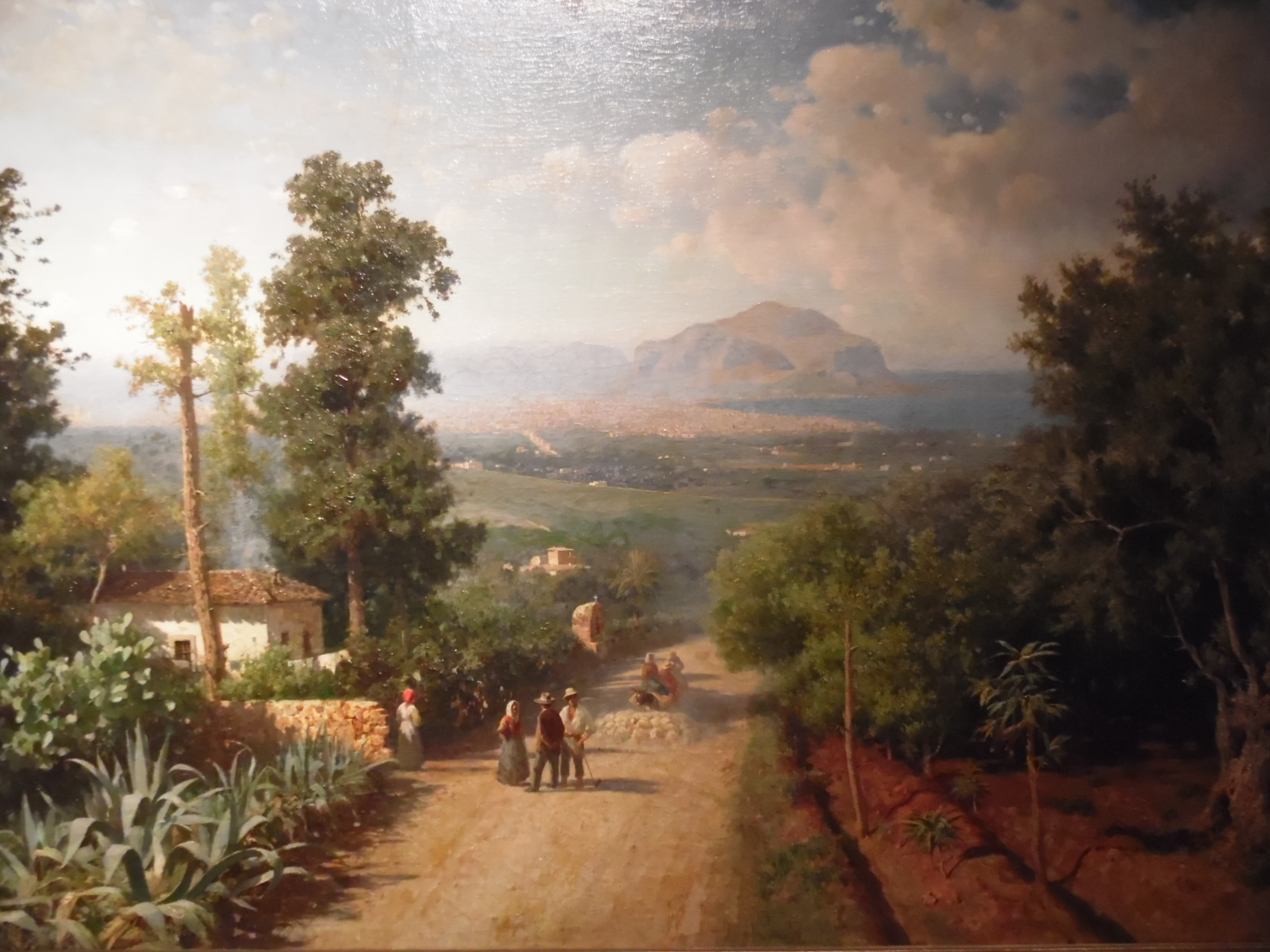
View of Palermo (1875) by Lo Jacono

- Francesco Lojacono (Palermo 1838 – 1915)
  - View of Monte Catalfano, 1865-1870 circa, oil on canvas, cm 45 × 109
  - Wind on the Mountain, 1872, oil on canvas, cm 106 × 134,5
  - Alti pascoli, 1894-1896 circa, oil on canvas, cm 46 × 84,3
  - A Small Rock, 1900-1914 circa, oil on canvas, cm 57 × 137
  - View of Palermo, 1875, oil on canvas, cm 78 × 156
  - Rocks (The Rock), 1895–1905, oil on canvas, cm 84 × 46
  - Mareggiata, 1900-1914 circa, oil on panel, cm 21 × 39,5
  - Backwash at Sea, 1909 circa, oil on panel, cm 24 × 34
  - Monte San Giuliano, 1875-1880 circa, oil on canvas, cm 75 × 42,2
  - Marina (Marina with a Ship), 1880-1890 circa, oil on canvas, cm 33,5 × 97,5
  - Bathtub with Leaves (Bathtub with capelvenere and alocasia), 1897 circa, oil on canvas, cm 41,7 × 70,5
  - Study of a Swamp, 1905-1910 circa, oil on canvas, cm 57 × 110
  - Autumn (Autumn on the Anapo), 1907 circa, oil on canvas, cm 138 × 238
- Eustachio Catalano
  - In a Garden, 1938 circa, oil on panel, cm 79 x 61,4

== Gallery ==
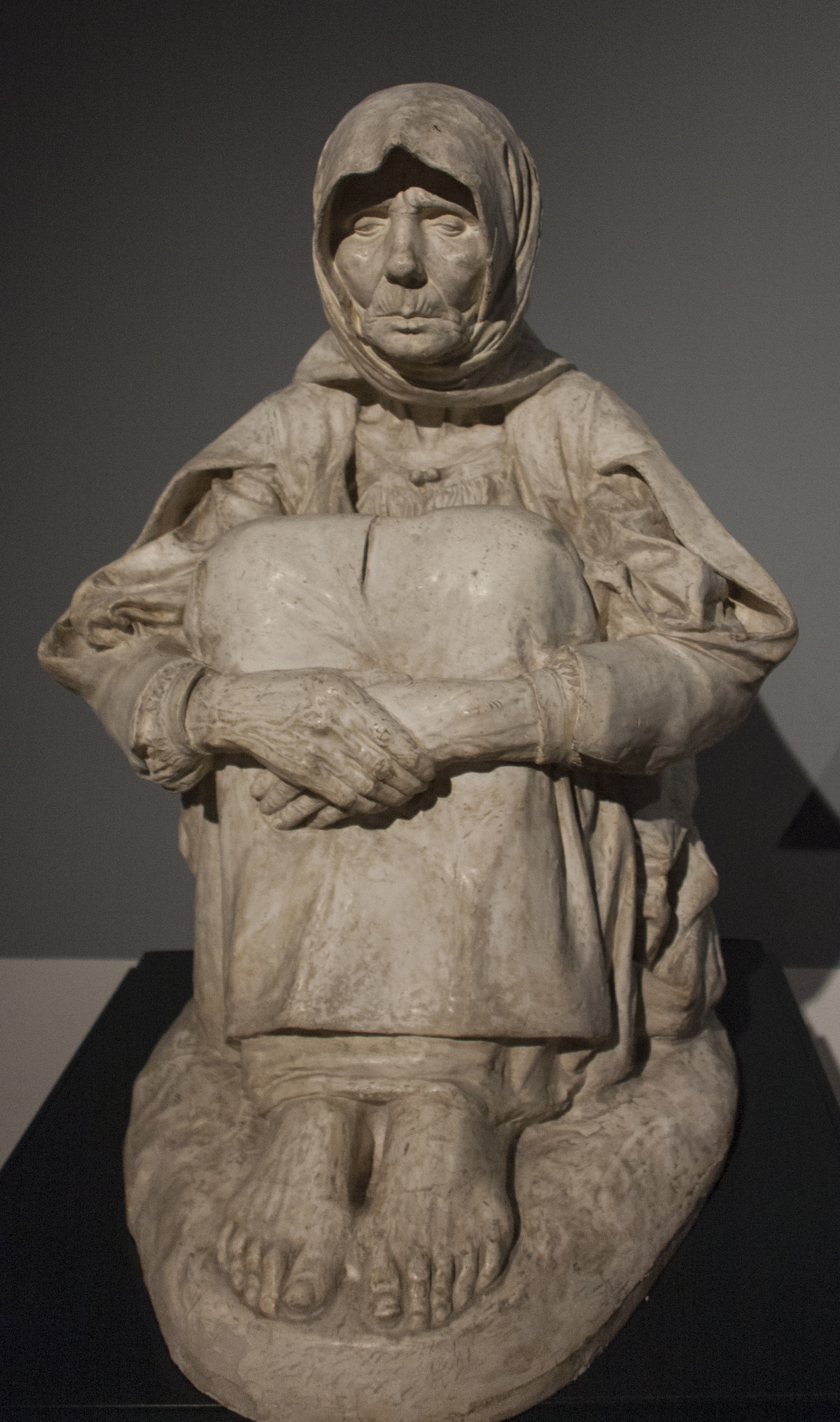
Francesco Ciusa, The Mother of the Murdered Man, 1907

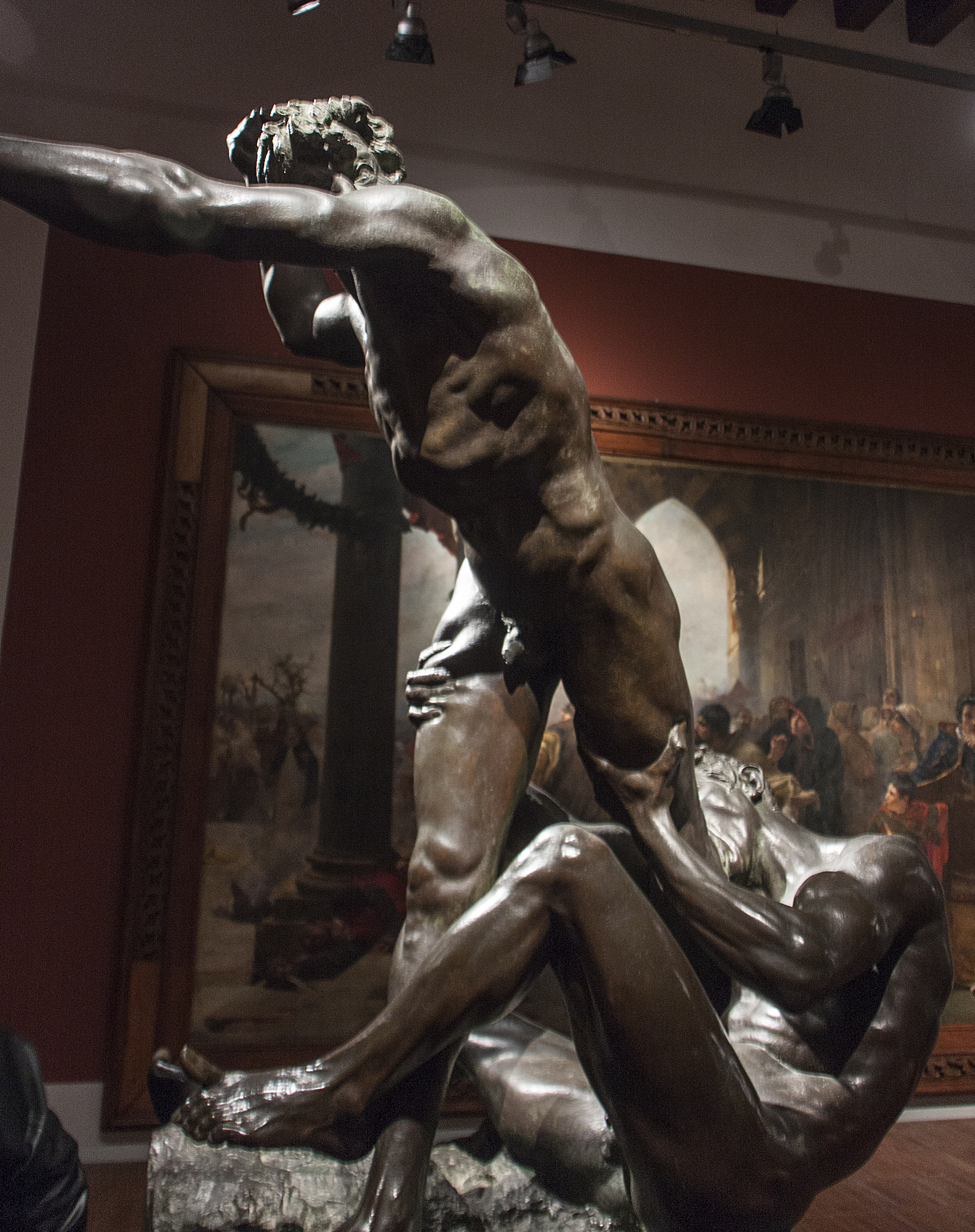
Mario Rutelli, The Wrathful, 1910

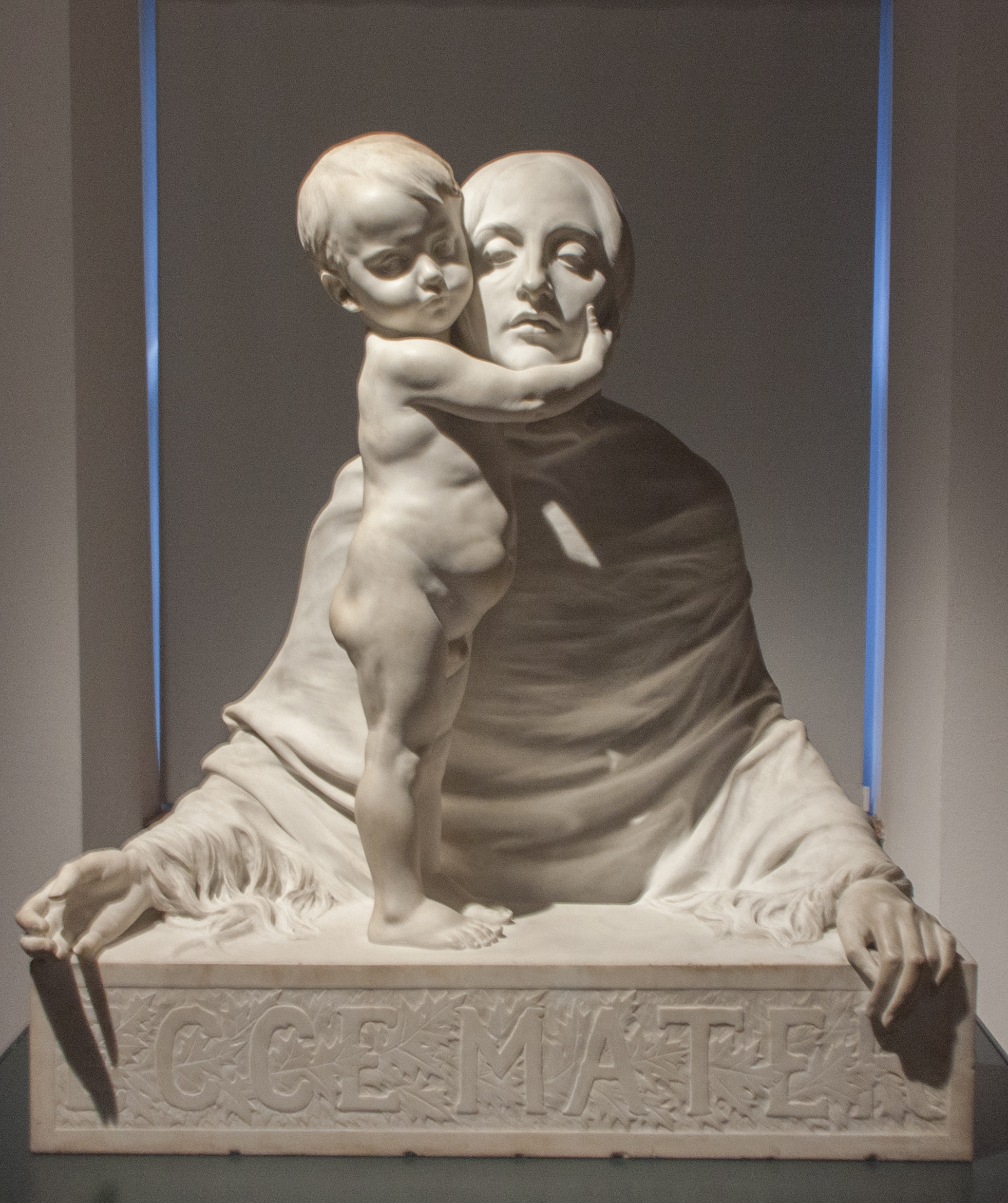
Ettore Ximenes, Ecce Mater, 1936

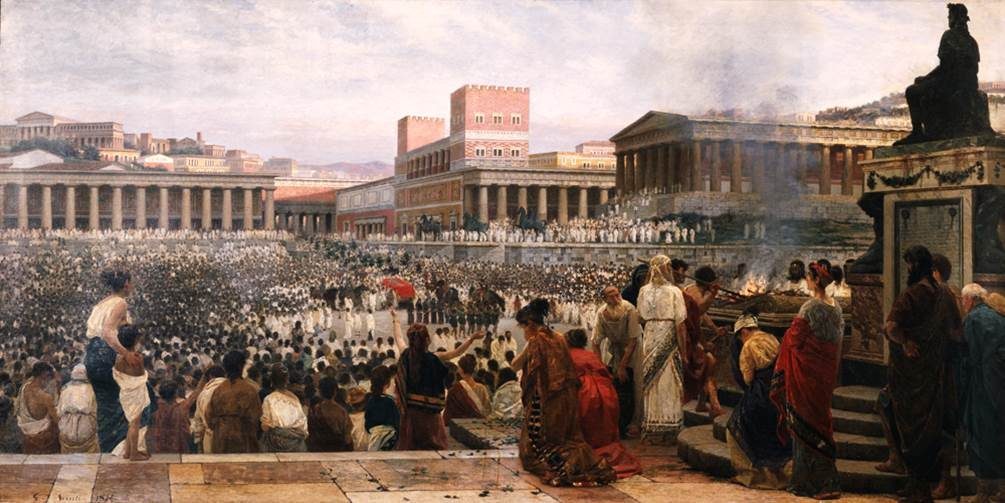
Giuseppe Sciuti, The Funeral of Timoleon, 1874
