= Giuseppe Tambuscio =

Italian painter

Giuseppe Tambuscio (born March 1848) was an Italian painter.

== Biography ==
He was born in Palermo. He studied under the painters Giuseppe Meli and Salvatore Loforte. At the age of twenty years, was chosen to become an assistant professor for design at the Scuola Tecnica per gli operai in Palermo. In 1873 he moved to Naples to study at the Institute of Fine Arts.

Returning to Palermo, he worked in lithography for many years, and illustrated the Journal of Natural Sciences for the account of the scientists Gaetano Giorgio Gemmellaro and Giuseppe Inzenga. Tambuscio also painted watercolors, which were patronized by the Grand Duke of Mecklenburg, a prominent patron in Palermo. He made reproductions of Sicilian artworks, using etching and lithography and chromolithography. Tambuscio also illustrated the work of the Monsignor Gioacchino Di Marzo titled I Gagini e la scultura in Sicilia nei secoli XIV e XVI. He became titular professor of painting and watercolor at the Royal School of the Museo Artistico-Industriale of Palermo.
