= Francesco Lojacono =

Italian painter (1838–1915)

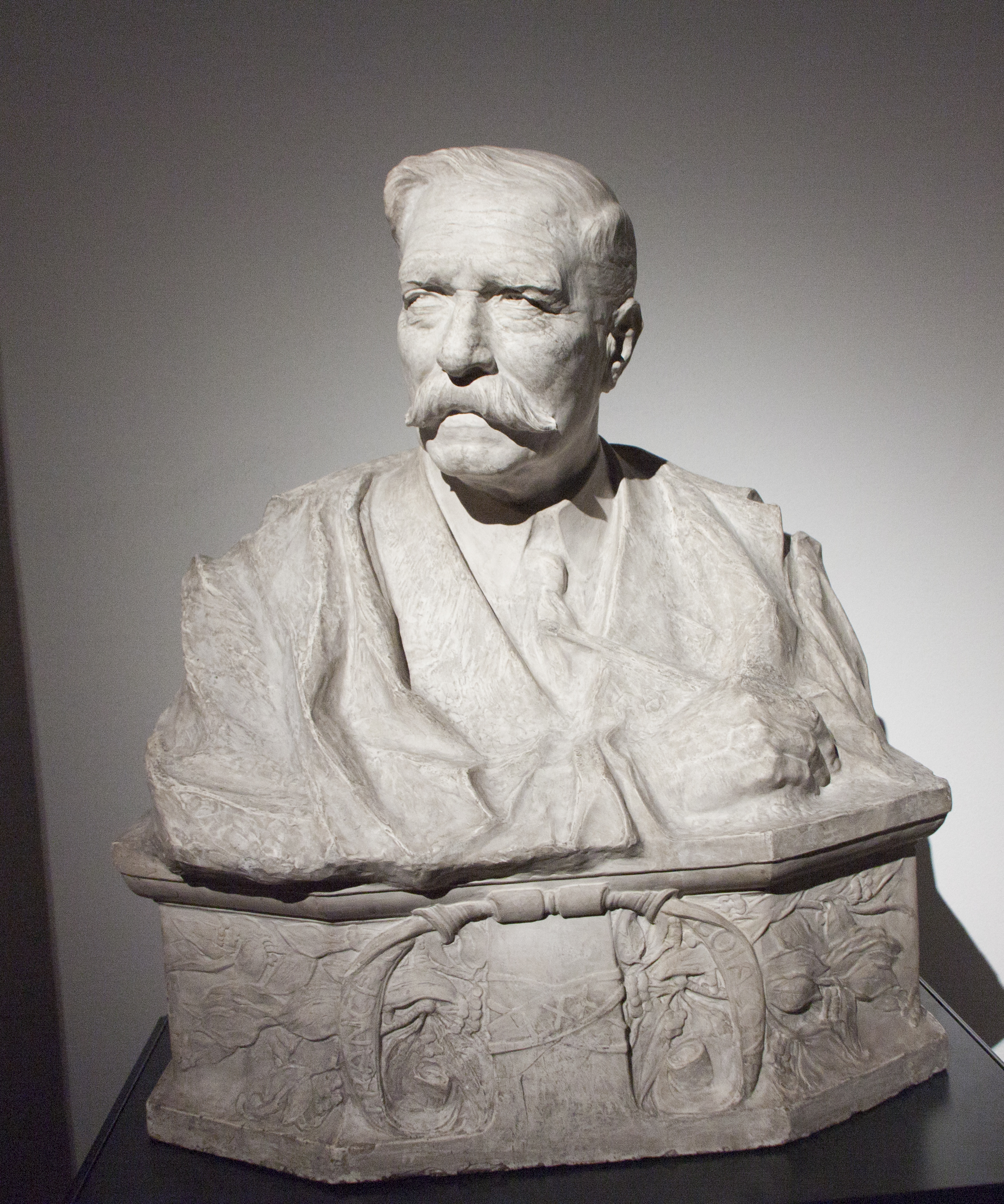
- Bust of Francesco Lojacono by sculptor Archimede Campini
- Born: 1838; Palermo, Kingdom of the Two Sicilies
- Died: 1915 (aged 76–77)
- Known for: Landscape painter

Francesco Lojacono or Lo Jacono (1838–1915) was an Italian painter, mainly of landscapes and seascapes, and mainly active in his native Palermo, Sicily.

== Biography ==
He received his early training there with his father Luigi, a history and portrait painter, and subsequently with Salvatore Lo Forte. Francesco Lojacono won a gold medal for a small canvas presented at an exhibition in Palermo, and this gained him a stipend to move in 1856 to Naples, where attended the school of Filippo Palizzi. With the outbreak of revolution in 1860, he returned to Sicily, he served in Garibaldi’s expedition of one thousand volunteers in 1860 and participated in the march towards Rome in 1862, when he was taken prisoner on the Aspromonte. Once free, he devoted his energies to painting intensely lyrical landscapes drawing inspiration in particular from the area around Agrigento and later the coast near Palermo.

He obtained the post of professor of landscape at the Naples Institute of Fine Arts in 1872 and taught the courses of landscape and seascape painting at the Palermo Academy of Fine Arts from 1896 to 1914. He took part in the international exhibitions held in Vienna (1872) and Paris (1878) and presented work with unquestionable success at the major national events, including the Palermo exhibition of 1891–92. He was named Commendatore of the Order of the Crown of Italy.

One of his pupils was Michele Catti, who together with Lojacono and Antonio Leto forms the so-called canonical triad of the Sicilian landscape artists of the Belle Époque. Another pupil was Ettore De Maria Bergler.

Among his works are: Giorno di caldo; I pescatori d'ostriche (considered one of his masterworks); Una villa ai Colli; Dopo la pioggia; L'arrivo inatteso; Il riposo di maggio; Un giorno di caldo in Sicilia; L'ottobre; After il tramonto; La Conca d'oro; San Giovanni degli Eremiti; Presso Posillipo; Presso il Vesuvio; Le rovine del tempio di Castore e Polluce; Gli ultimi Saraceni; and La pesca dei vongoli.

== Gallery of Works ==
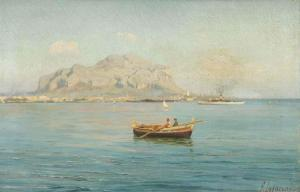
Bay of Palermo

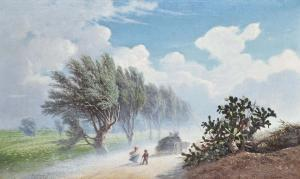
Travellers caught in the wind on a dusty track

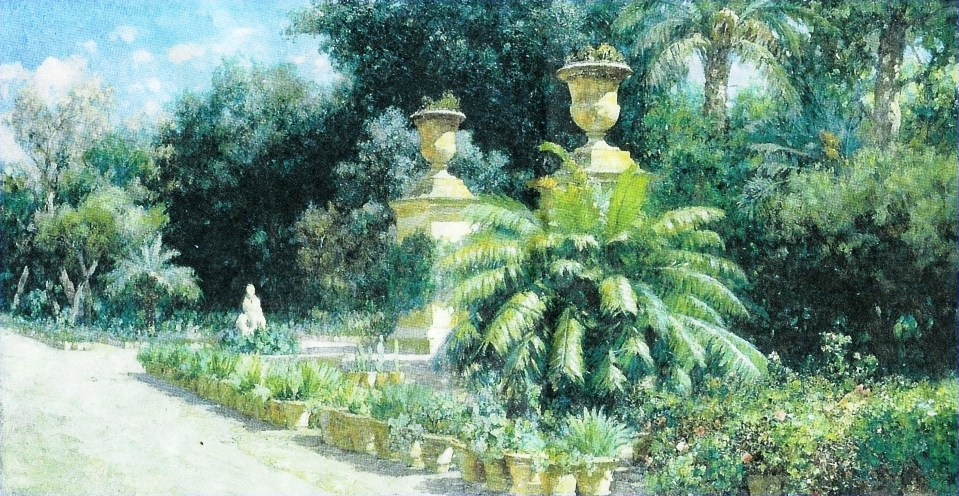
Orto Botanico, Palermo

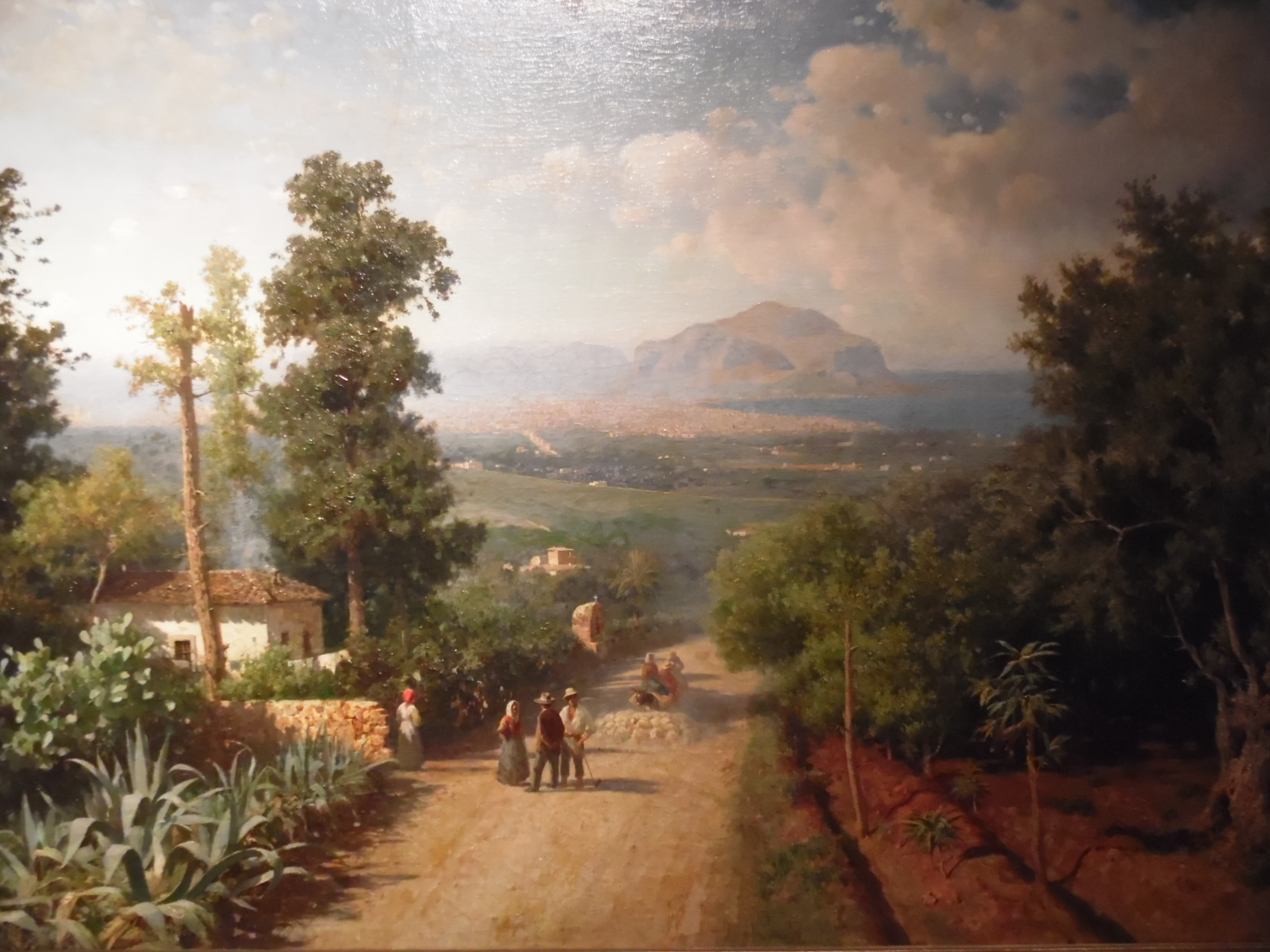
Veduta di Palermo (1875) at GAM Palermo

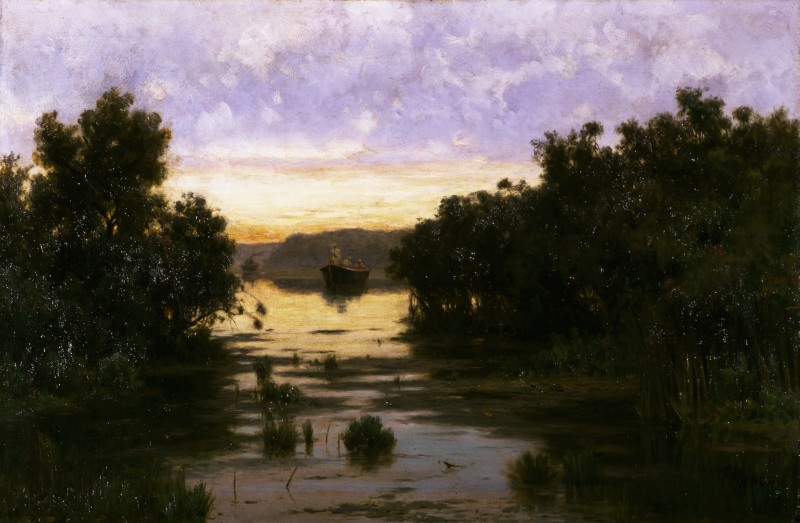
Le Paludi (The Swamps) at Fondazione Cariplo

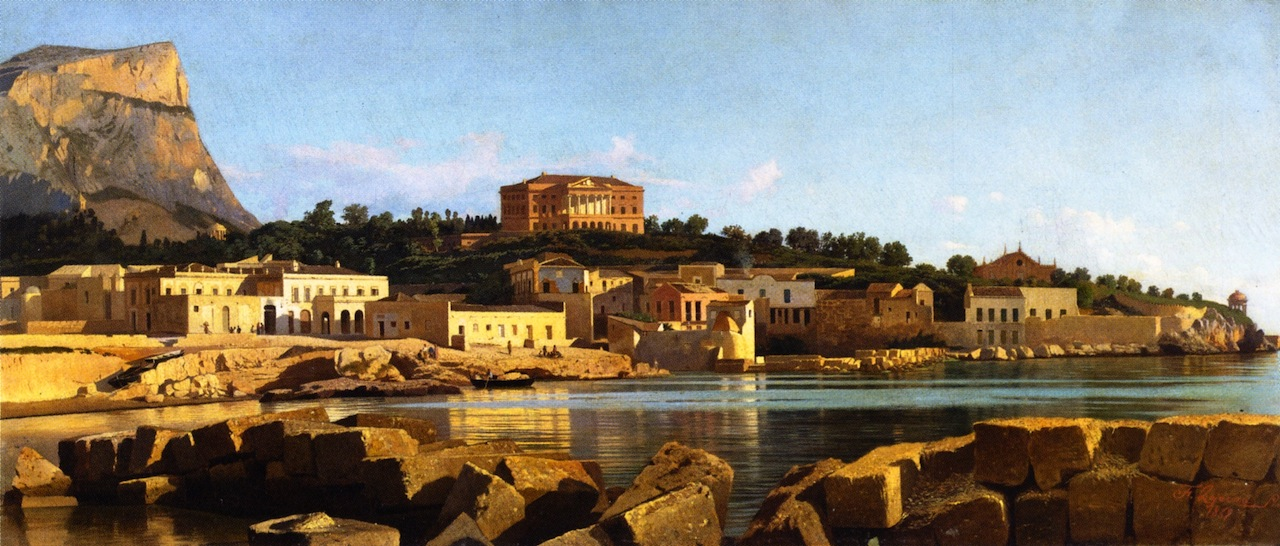
View of Acquasanta, Palermo

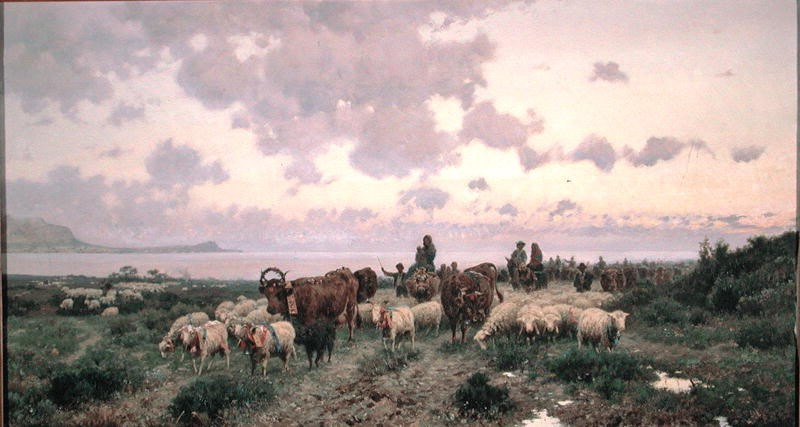
Flocks at Mondello at Musée Condé

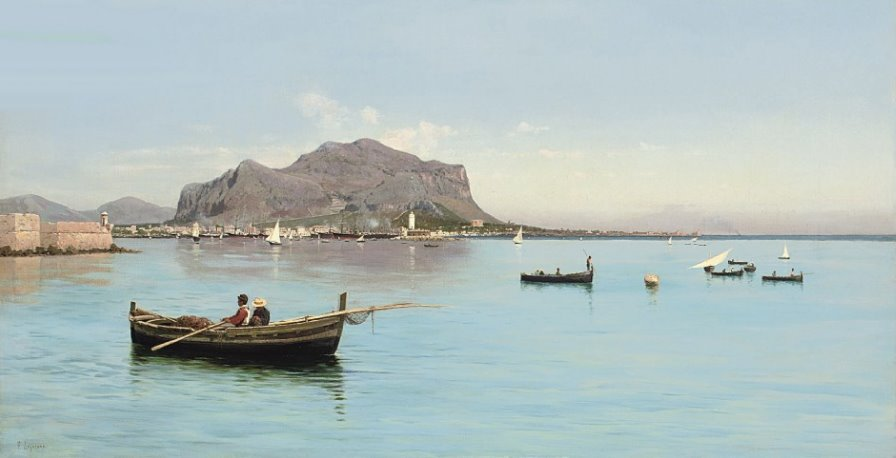
Fishermen before the Monte Pellegrino in Palermo

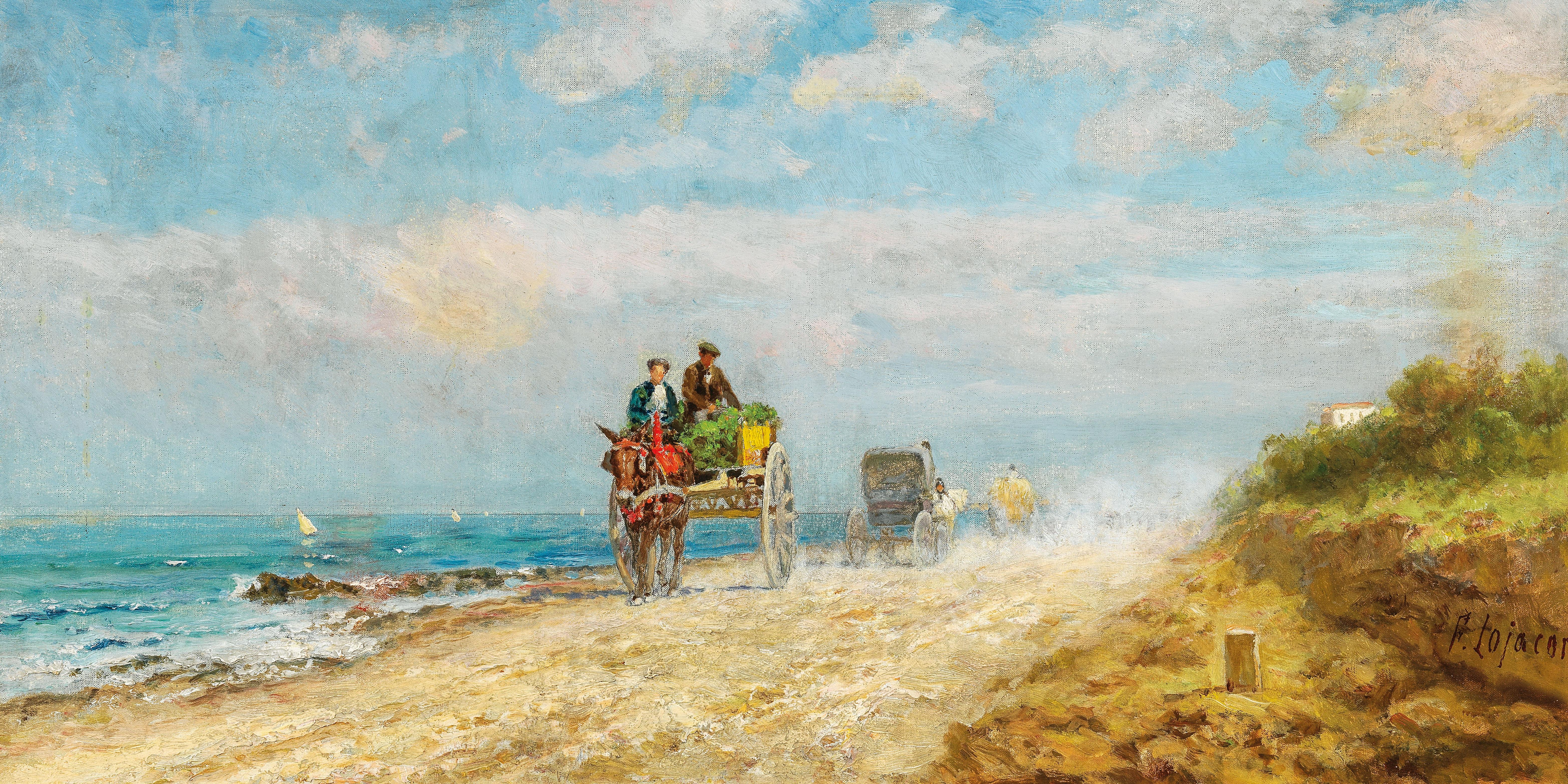
Sulla Via di Romagnolo

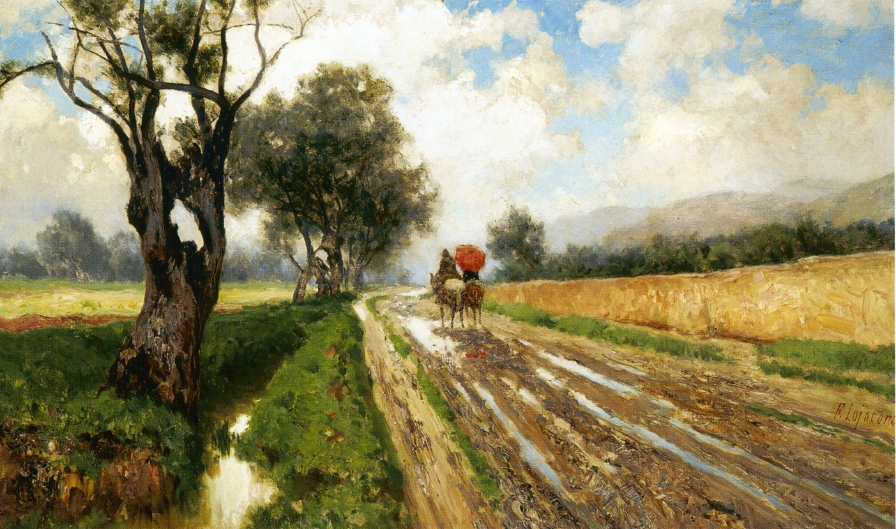
Country Road with Figure

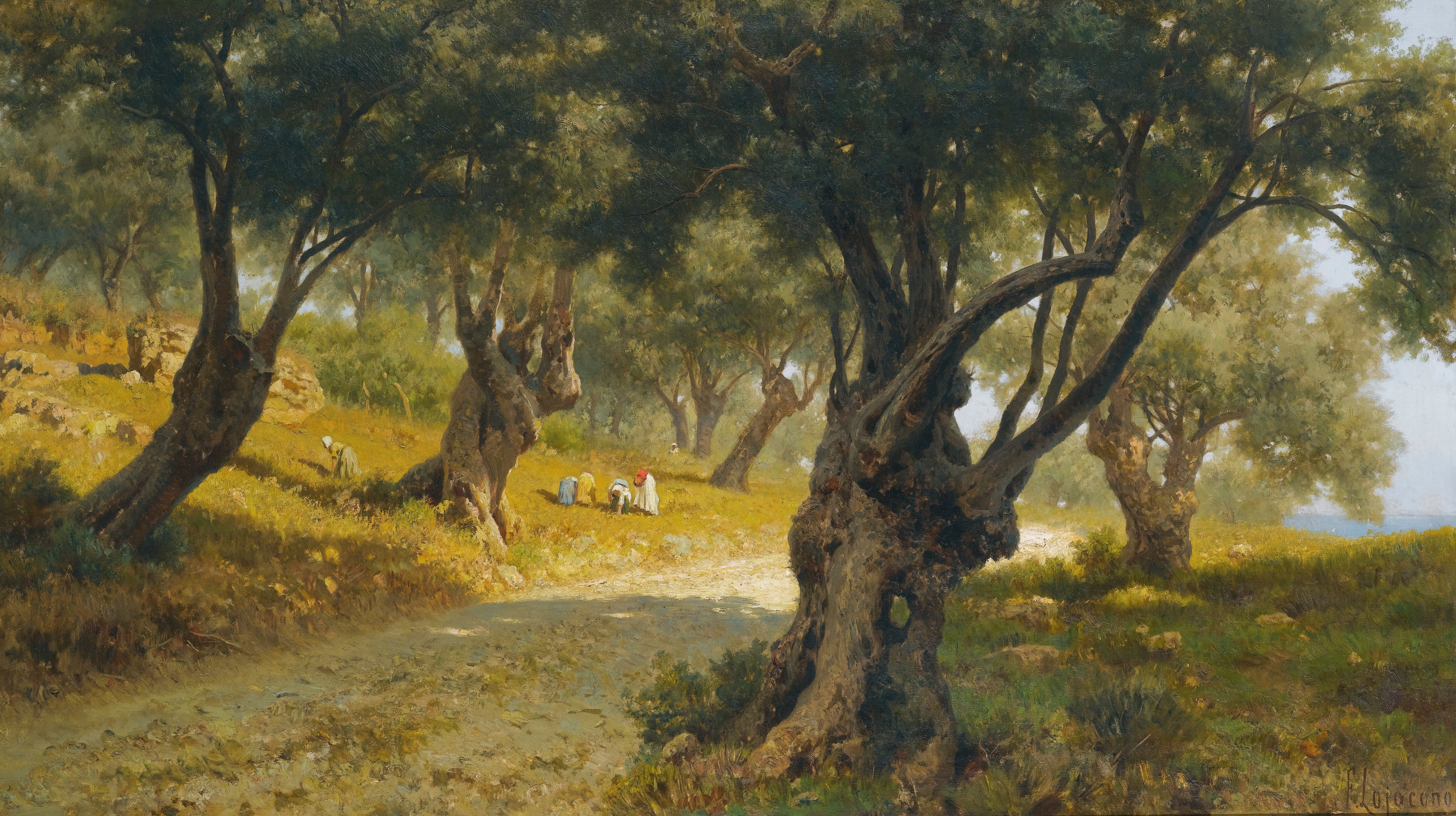
Olive Grove
