= Salvatore Lo Forte =

Italian painter

Salvatore Loforte
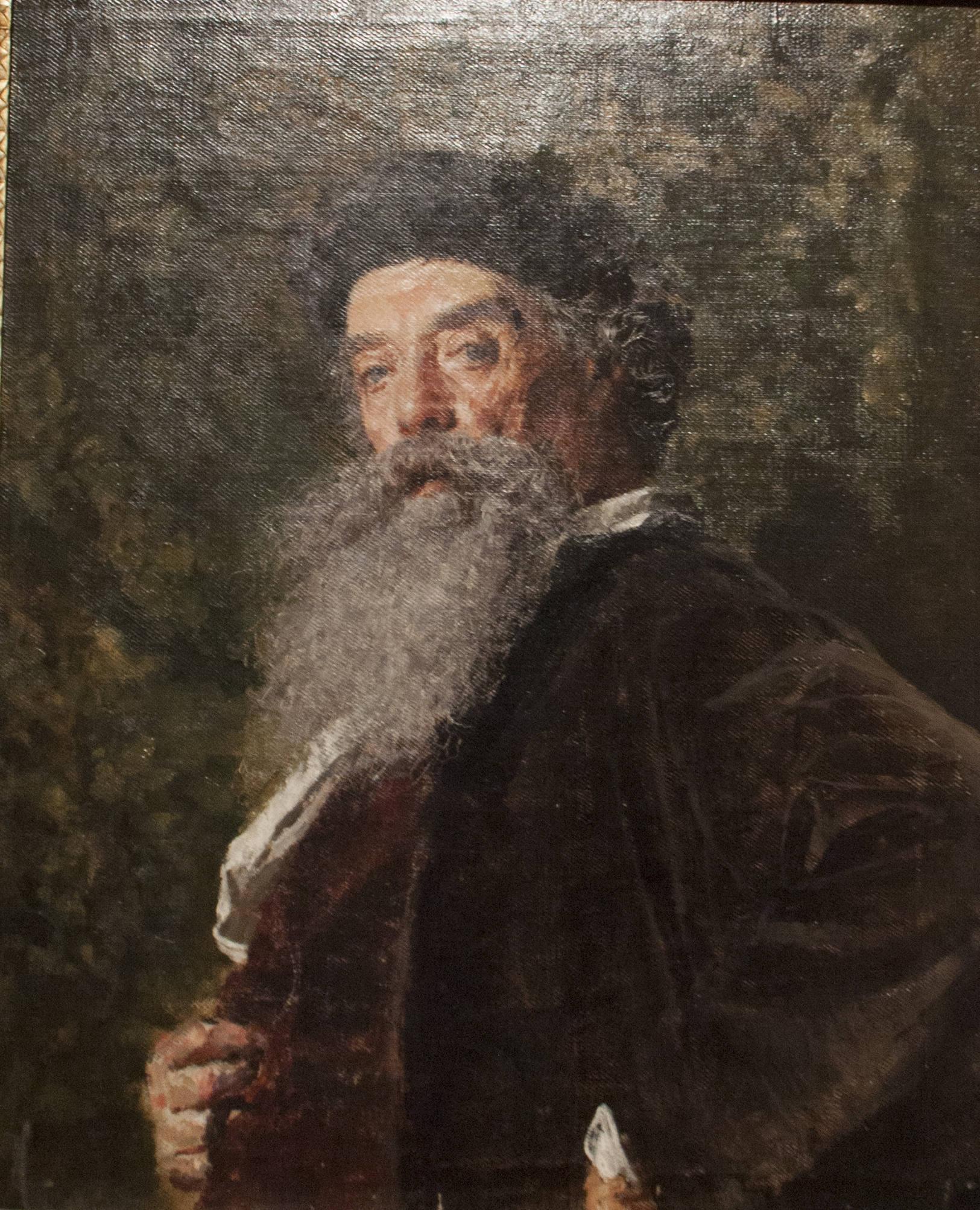
- Portrait of Loforte by Paolo Vetri
- Born: 20 March 1804; Palermo, Italy
- Died: 11 January 1885 (aged 80); Palermo, Italy
- Known for: Painter
- Movement: Neoclassicism

Salvatore Lo Forte (20 March 1804 – 11 January 1885), also sometimes written Loforte, was an Italian painter, active mainly in his native Palermo and painting in a neoclassical style.

== Biography ==
He was born in Palermo. His first training was under the painter G. Burgio, and they Vincenzo Riolo. In 1816, he attended lessons in the Royal Accademia del Nudo of Palermo, where he studied under Giuseppe Velasco. Along with Riolo he was employed in the restoration of the Novelli frescoes in the Chapel of the Holy Crucifix in the church of San Filippo Neri in Palermo. In 1824, he received a scholarship from the Municipal government to study under Vincenzo Camuccini in Rome.

By 1830, he was back in Palermo, where he painted the Blessed Sebastiano Valfré performs the miracle of healing a cripple for the church of Sant'Ignazio all'Olivella. In 1837, he was appointed director of the Regia Accademia del Nudo, succeeding Riolo. In 1857, Lo Forte was replaced by Francesco Lo Jacono.

He was in demand for both portraits and religious subjects. His portrait of Garibaldi is on display at the Galleria d'Arte Moderna Palermo. He painted an altarpiece depicting Saints Benedict and Scholastica for the church of Santa Chiara, Noto. One of his pupils was Giuseppe Tambuscio. There is a bust of the painter on display in the gardens of Villa Bonnano of Palermo.

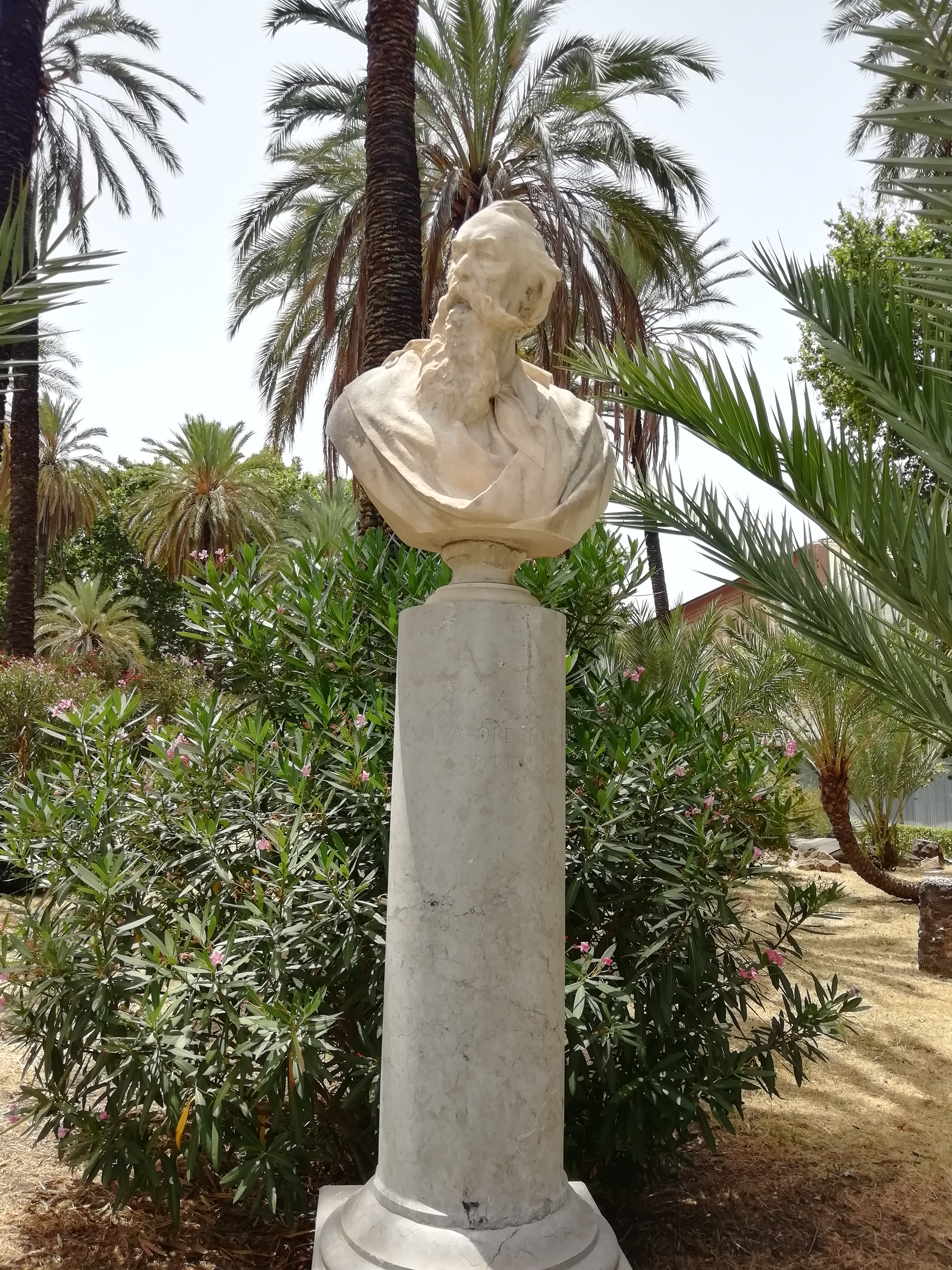
Bust depicting Lo Forte in Villa Bonnano

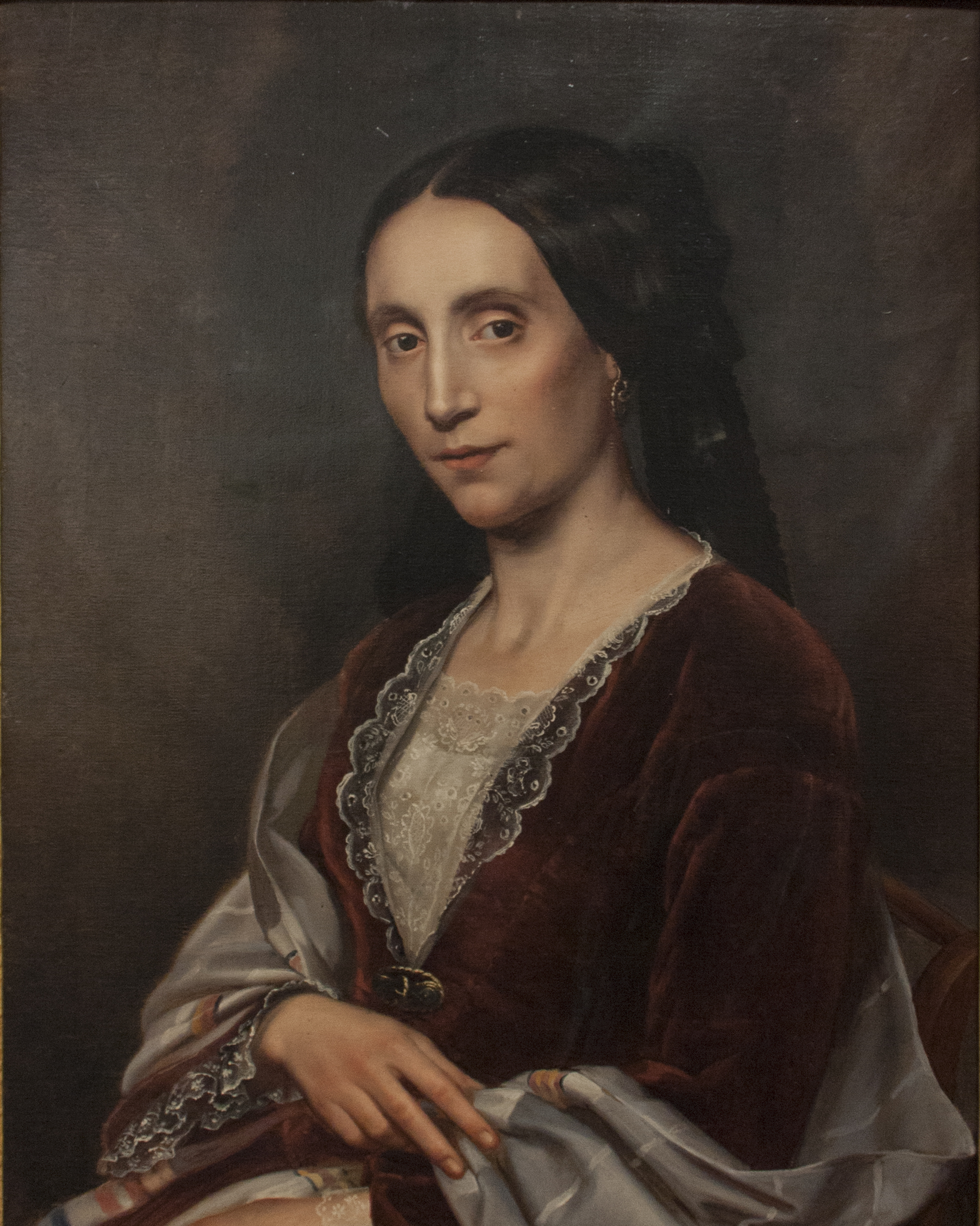
Portrait of Lady Pintacuda by Lo Forte

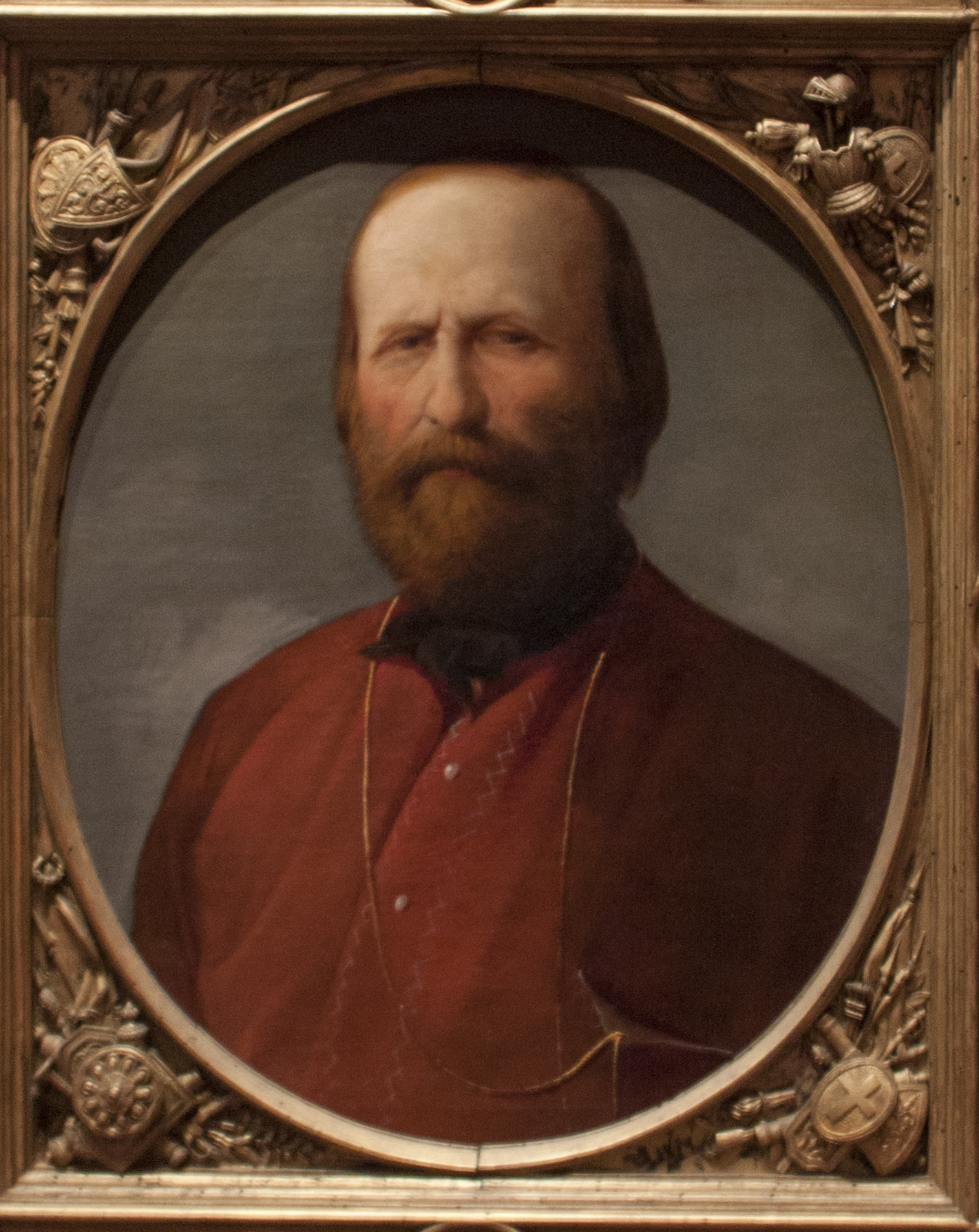
Portrait of Garibaldi by Lo Forte
