= Elisa Maria Boglino =

Danish-Italian painter

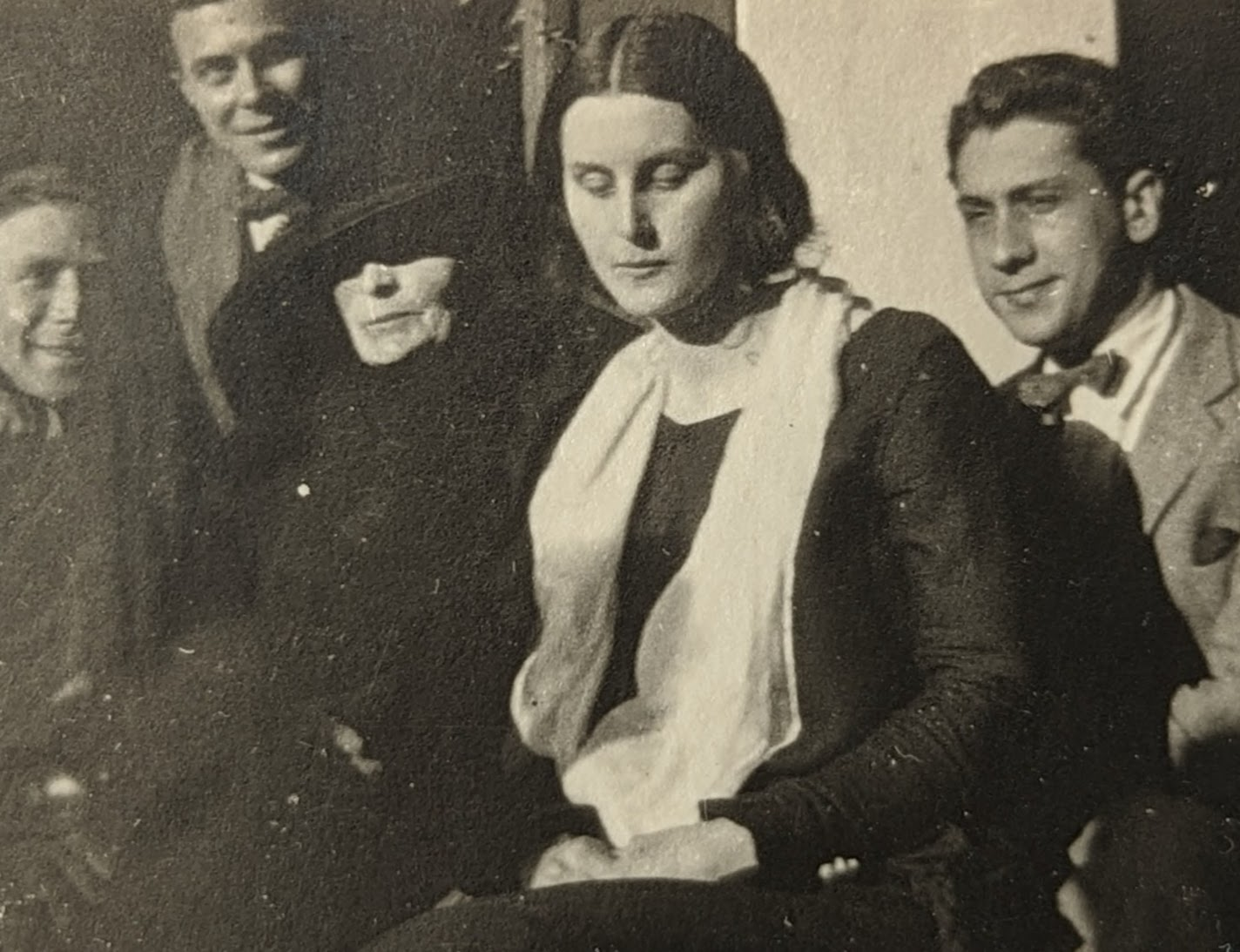
- Boglino photographed in Palermo c. 1930, with her mother to the left and husband to the right
- Born: Elisa Johanne Rosa Maria Maioli; 7 May 1905; Copenhagen, Denmark
- Died: 2002 (aged 96–97); Rome, Italy
- Resting place: Cimetero di Santa'Orsola, Palermo
- Education: Royal Danish Academy of Fine Arts, Copenhagen
- Known for: Painting, drawing
- Notable work: Donna e bimbo Le alienate Selfportrait 1930 https://open.smk.dk/artwork/image/KMS9148
- Style: Avant-garde, Expressionism
- Spouse: Giovanni Boglino

Elisa Johanne Rosa Maria Boglino (7 May 1905 – 2002) was a Danish-Italian painter, active in Denmark and Italy.

== Biography ==
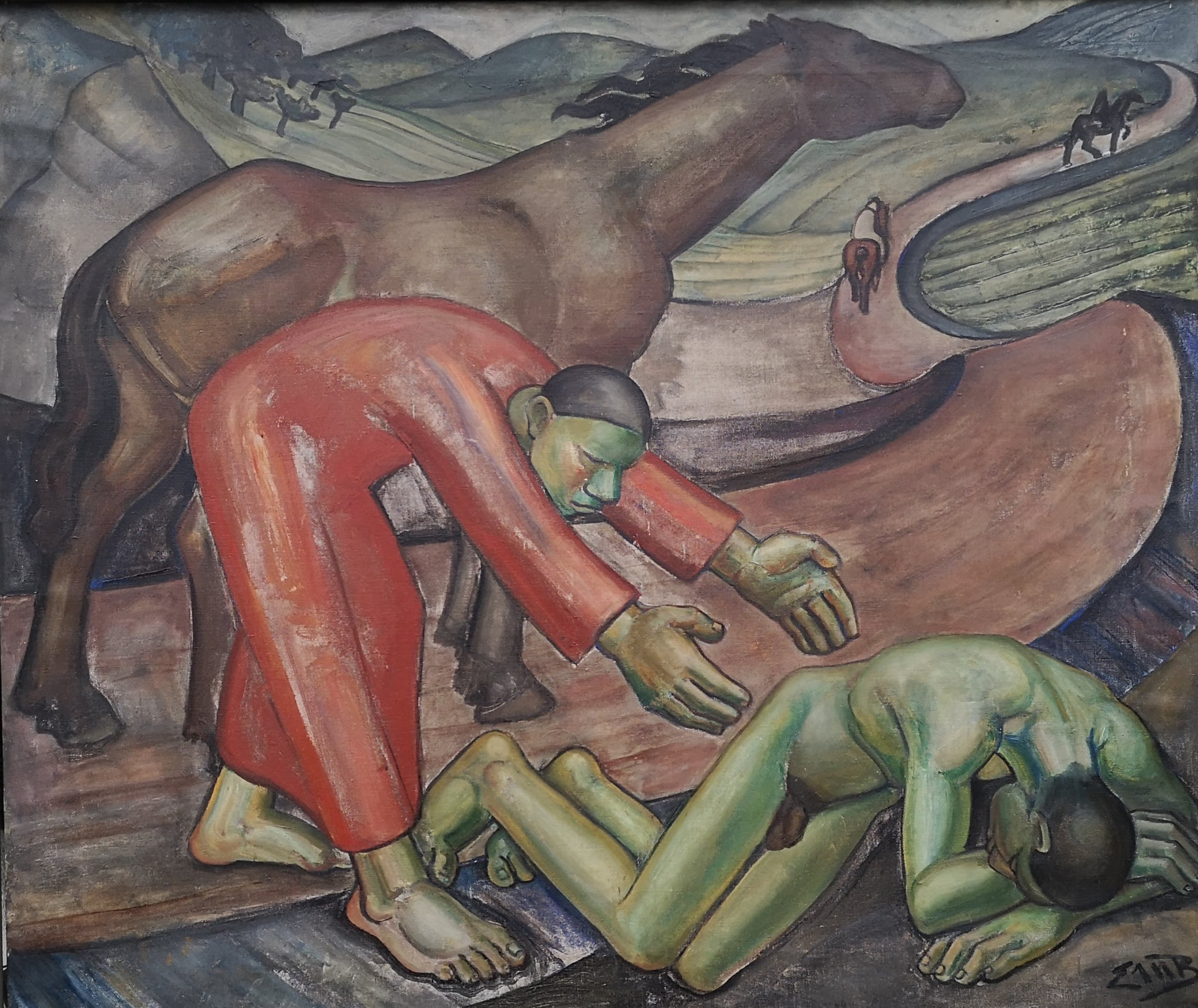
"Soccorso", oil painting, according to Emporium (a periodical; it), in 1932. (The catalogue for an exhibition in 2012 at Reale Albergo delle Povere (Palermo) claims that this oil painting is from 1928, furthermore claiming it is called "The good Samaritan") " The Good Samaritan" At the National Gallery of Denmarc

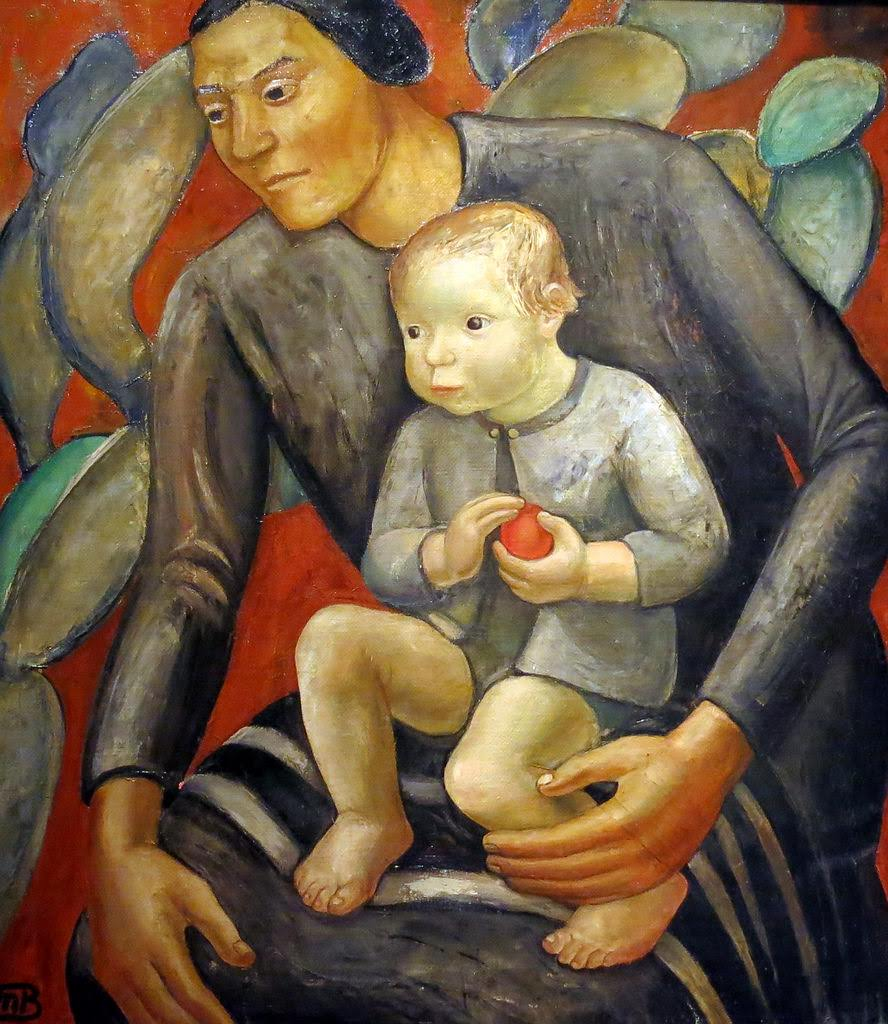
"Donna e Bimbo" (1930; oil on canvas). Modern Art Gallery Sant'Anna (Palermo)

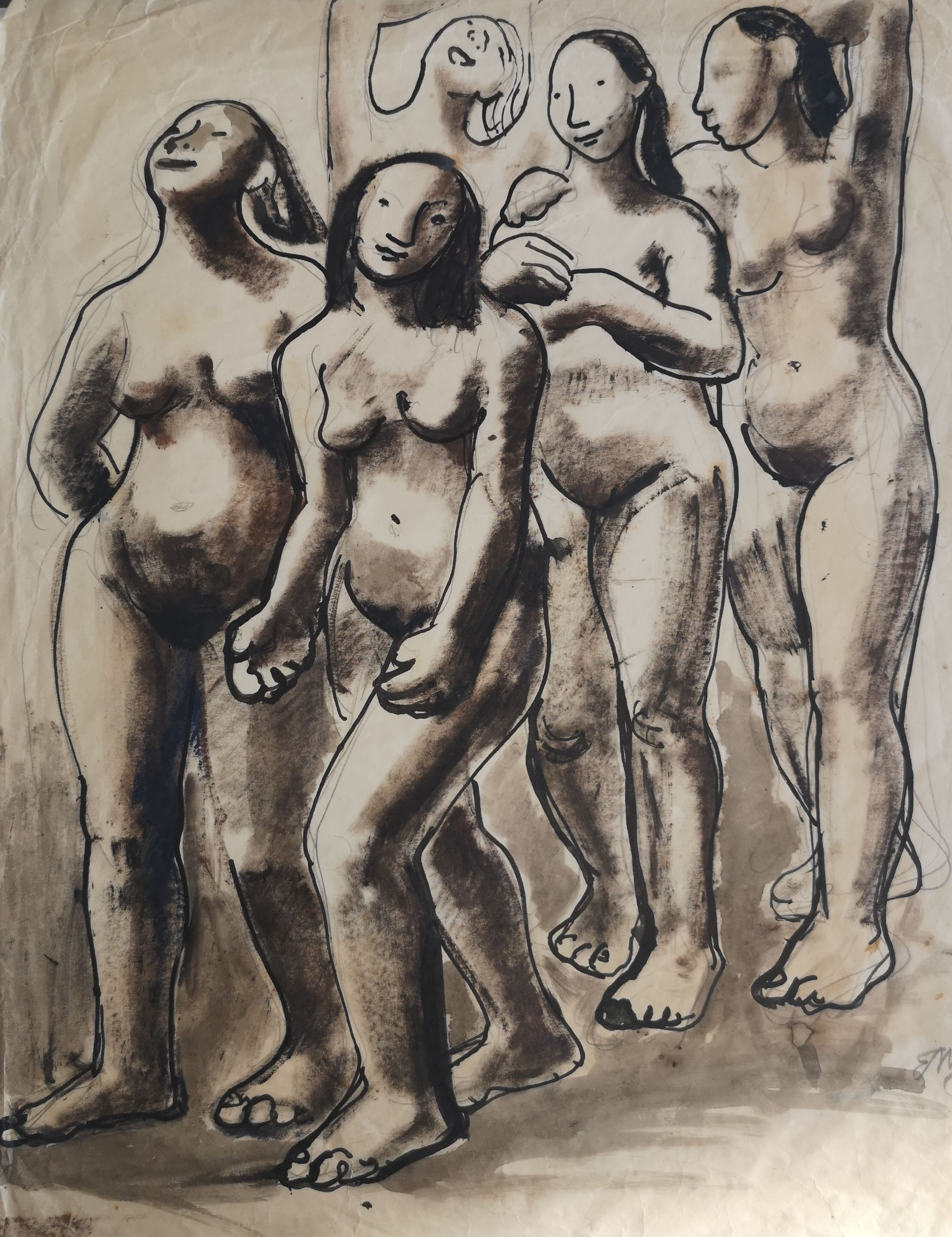
Naked Women in motion. India ink. 1927 National Gallery of Denmark

The father was Legationssekr. Alberto Maioli.

Boglino grew up with her divorced mother. Boglino married, and settled in Palermo in 1927.

According to a colleague from the years in Sicily Lia Pasqualina Noto (it) during the thirties it seems that Boglino had moved to Rome until her death.

Boglino studied from 1923 to 1926 at the Royal Danish Academy of Fine Arts under Sigurd Wandel

One painting was purchased by Modern Art Gallery Sant'Anna (Palermo)

Her husband was Giovanni Boglino (born 1898 in Palermo).

The family home during World War II was a vineyard in the mountains south of Cefalu on the northern cost of Sicily.

== Exhibitions ==
- 1926–27, 1929: Charlottenborg in Copenhagen
- 1930: Venice Biennale (sala 34 and 37, catalogue p. 127 and 136)
- 1930: Exhibitions at Mostre del Sindacato di Belle Arti [Syndicate of fine art] in Palermo, Catania and Florence
- 1932: Third Exhibition of The Sicilian Fascist Syndicate(wins prize Podesta di Palermo)
- 1932: Galleria di Roma (personal, curated by Pietro Maria Bardi)
- 1932: Galleria del Milione, Milan (personal
- 1932: Wolfgang Gurlitt Galleri, Berlin(personal)
- 1933-34: Venice Biennale (sala 48, cat. p. 190)
- 1933: Fourth Regional Exhibition of the Art Syndicate in Catania
- 1933: Gallery Christian Larsen in Copenhagen
- 1949: Bach's Kunsthandel in Copenhagen and at Jugels Kunst in Århus (Personal)
- 1954: Gallery "Vetrina of Chiurazzi" in Rome
- 1954: IV Exhibition of Painting in May in Bari
- 1956: VIII Exhibition og Painting C.I.M (wins prize of Roberto Merli)
- 1956: Venice Biennnale (sala 28, cat. p. 118)
- 1958: Gallery del Vantaggio, Rome (Personal)
- 1958: Premio di Pittura Valle Roveto (wins prize of Zahrtmann)
- 1958: Biennale of holy art, Grosseto
- 1959: Maggio Pittura Romana (Painting in May Rome) (wins prize of Rome)
- 1960: Exhibition Augustinian of holy art, Rome
- 1963: Gallery del Vantaggio, Roma (personal)

Grønningen, in Copenhagen (invitated)

- 1976: Exhibition of holy art, Viterbo
- 1979: Gallery Hågen Muller, Copenhagen (personal)
- 1996: Art of Sicily in the Thirties, Trenta and Marsala
- 2001: The Church S. Maria in Montesanto, The Artists' Fair, Rome

Posthumous exhibitions:

- 2002: "In the Shadow"-Female art from the eighteenth and nineteenth century".Nell'Ombra – L’arte al femminile tra Ottocento e Novecento. (Gallery of modern art in Palermo – GAM)
- 2003-2004 (Minsk, Mosca, Barcellona, Palermo): Novecento Siciliano."Sicilian nineteenth"
- 2006:"The Wounds of being" . Solitude and meditation among Sicilian women in the thirties. Le ferite dell’essere: Solitudine e meditazione nelle siciliane degli anni ‘30, a cura di Anna Maria Ruta, Spazi Espositivi Chiaramontani, Agrigento.
- 2007: "Female avant-gardes in Italy and Russia", Avantguardie femminili in Italia e Russia, a cura di Renato Miracco, Galleria Regionale Pallazzo Bellomo, Palermo.
- 2012: "Womenart",100 years of female art in Sicily 1850-1950", Artedonna, Cento anni d’arte femminile in Sicilia 1850–1950, a cura di Anna Maria Ruta, presso il Reale Albergo delle Povere, Palermo.
- 2014: "Sicilian Artists, from Pirandello to Judice", Artisti di Sicilia, da Pirandello a Judice, a cura di Vittorio Sgarbi, presso l’ex Stabilimento Florio, Favignana, Catania.
- 2016-2017: "Topazia Alliata. A life in the sign of art", Topazia Alliata. Una vita nel segno dell’Arte, a cura di Anna Maria Ruta, presso Palazzo S. Elia, Palermo.
- 2020-2021: "Sicilian Artists", Artisti di Sicilia, a cura di Vittorio Sgarbi, presso Convitto delle Arti, Noto.
- 2024: Personal in Pescara:"Elisa Maria Boglino-da Copenaghen a Roma-tra due Patrie nella Pittura-Between two homelands in painting" curated by Marco Nocca.

== Works ==
- "Donna e bimbo" / "Madre e Figlia" (Woman and Child) - [permanent collection] at Modern Art Gallery Sant'Anna (in Palermo).
- "Figures" and "Horses" Civic Gallery of Modern and Contemporary Art, Monreale, Sicily
- "Donne col Parapioggia": Museo valle Roveto Civita d'Antino
- "Le Alienate"( The Obsessed) At The Museo Mart, Museo di arte moderna e contemporanea di Trento e Rovereto
- "Donna Seduta" (Seated Woman") Collezione Antonio Pusateri, Agrigent
- "Emmaus" Basilica Santa Maria in Leuca
- "The good Samaritan", "Selfpotrait 1930", "Jesus heals the obsessed" and "Matilde" and 6 drawings, are owned and exhibited by the National Gallery of Denmark. Selfportrait 1930 was bought by the museum in 2025

== Gallery ==
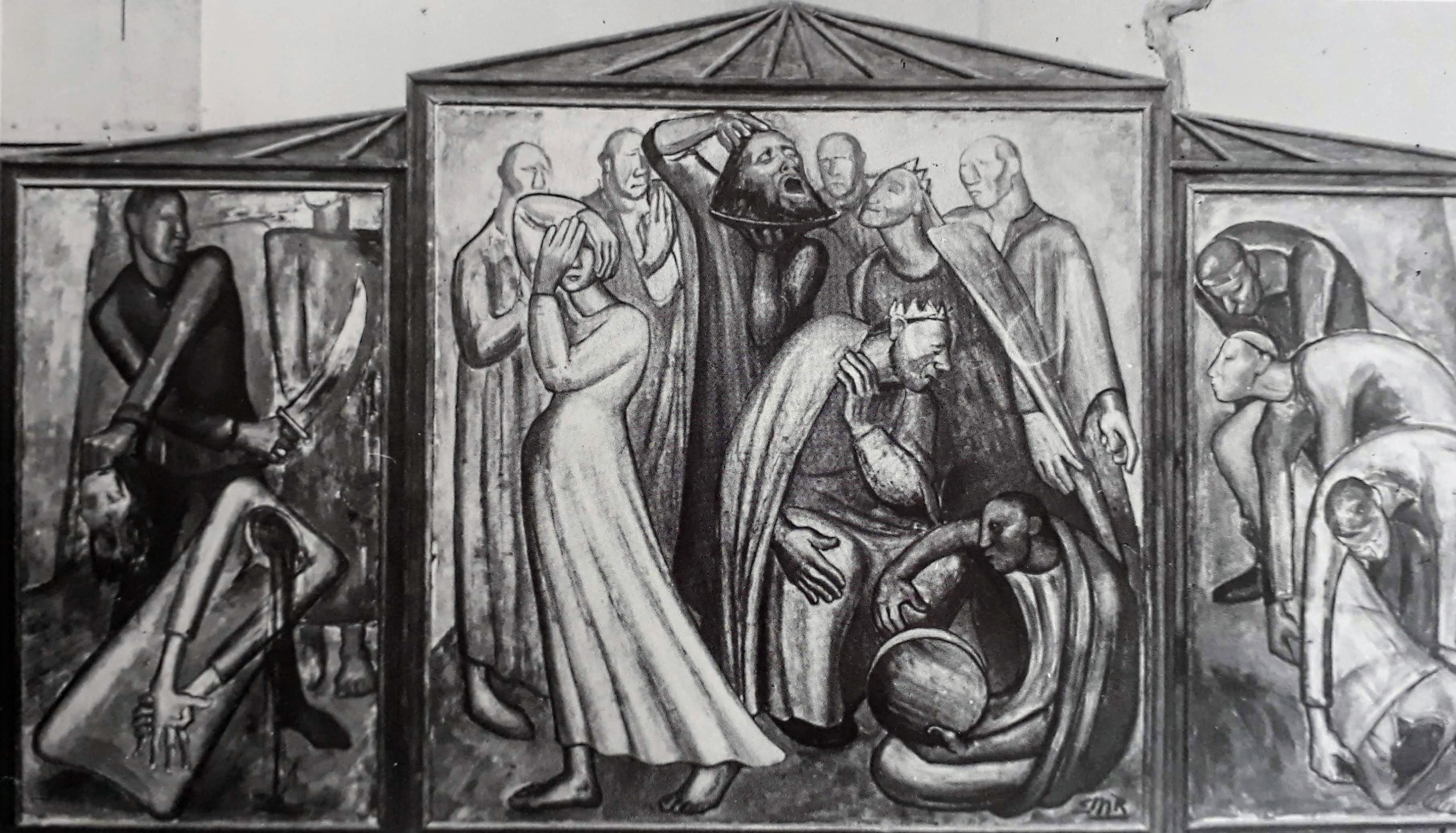
Triptycon. The Beheading of Sct. John the Baptist. Oil on canvas. Partial destroyed. ca.1927 (Artedonna p. 179)

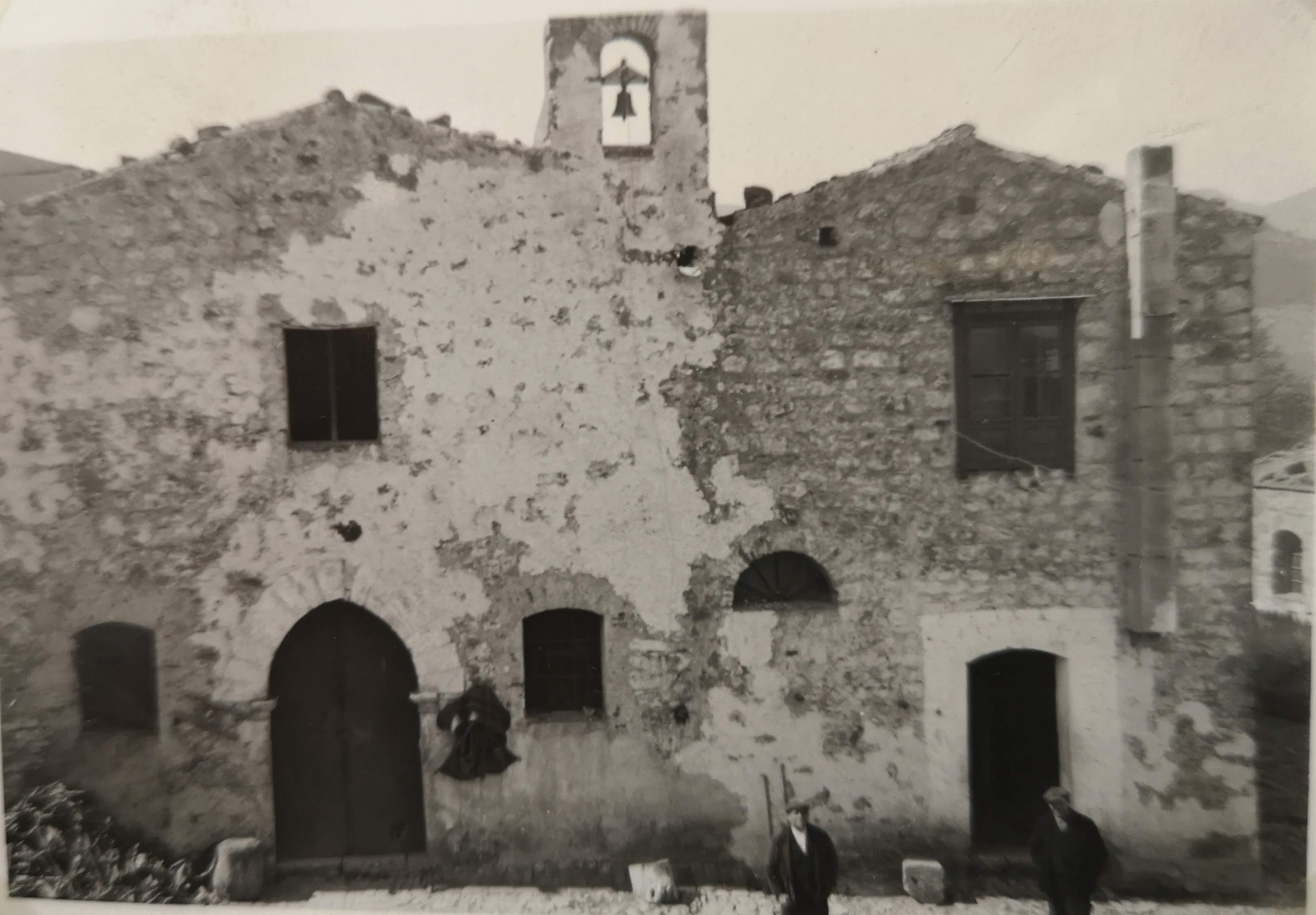
The family home (Santa Anastasia), just south of Cefalu as it looked in 1940, Photo

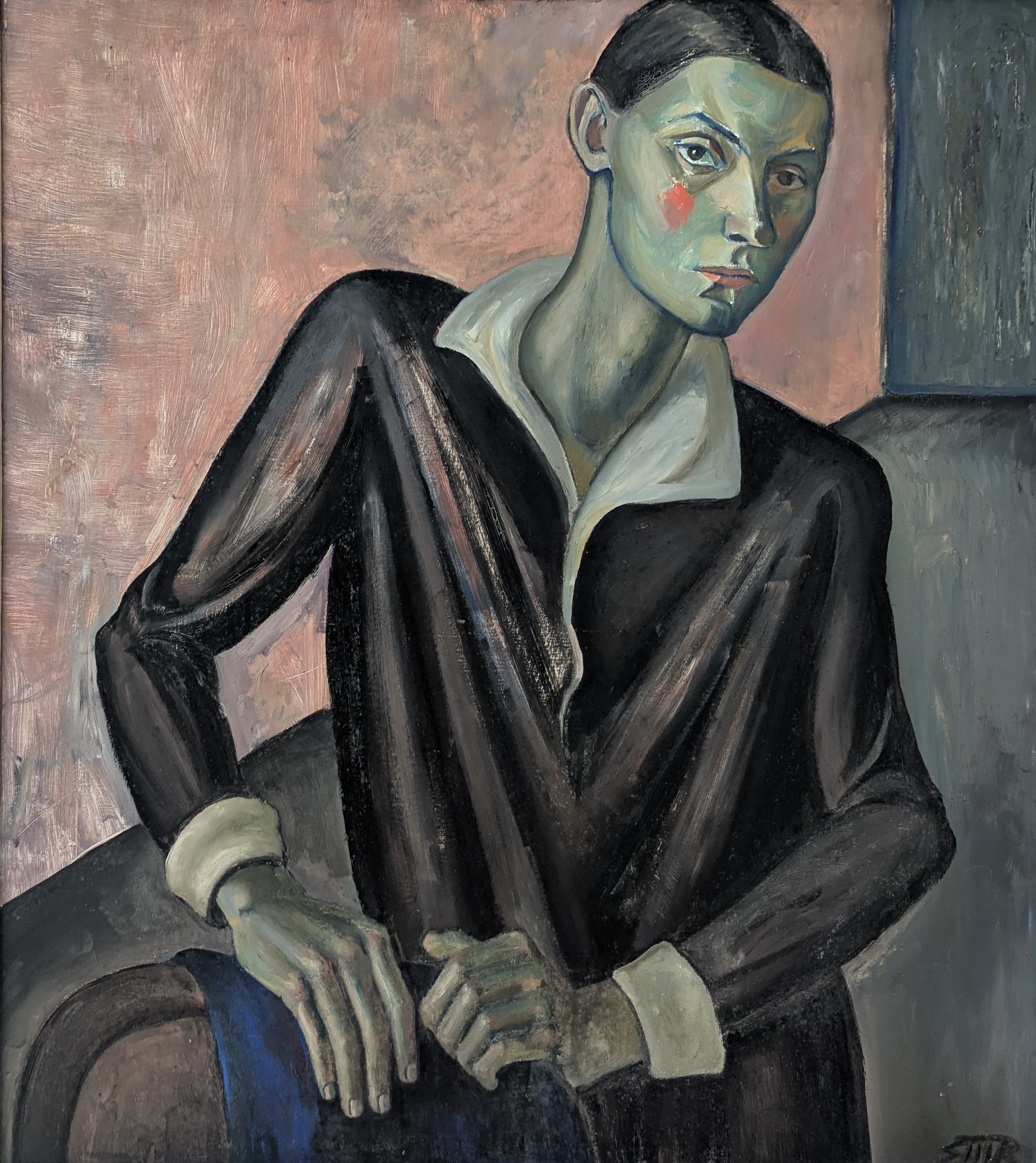
Self-portrait. Oil on canvas, 1930. At the National Gallery of Denmark
