= Ettore De Maria Bergler =

Italian painter (1838–1915)

- Born: 1850; Naples, Kingdom of the Two Sicilies
- Died: 1938 (aged 87–88); Palermo, Kingdom of Italy

Ettore De Maria Bergler (1850–1938) was an Italian painter, known for his Stile Liberty (Art Nouveau) painting, but also proficient in genre and landscapes.

== Biography ==
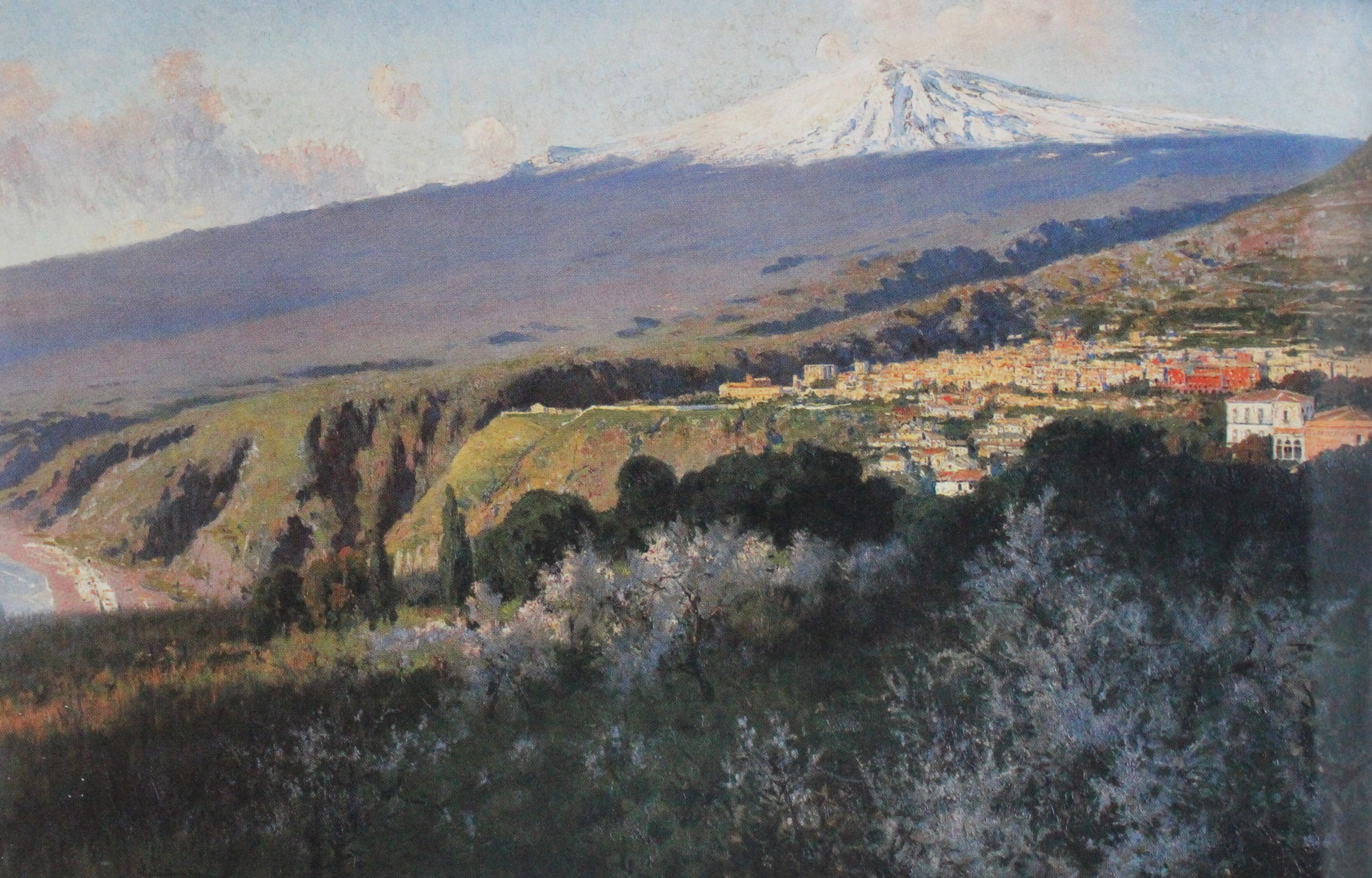
View from Taormina

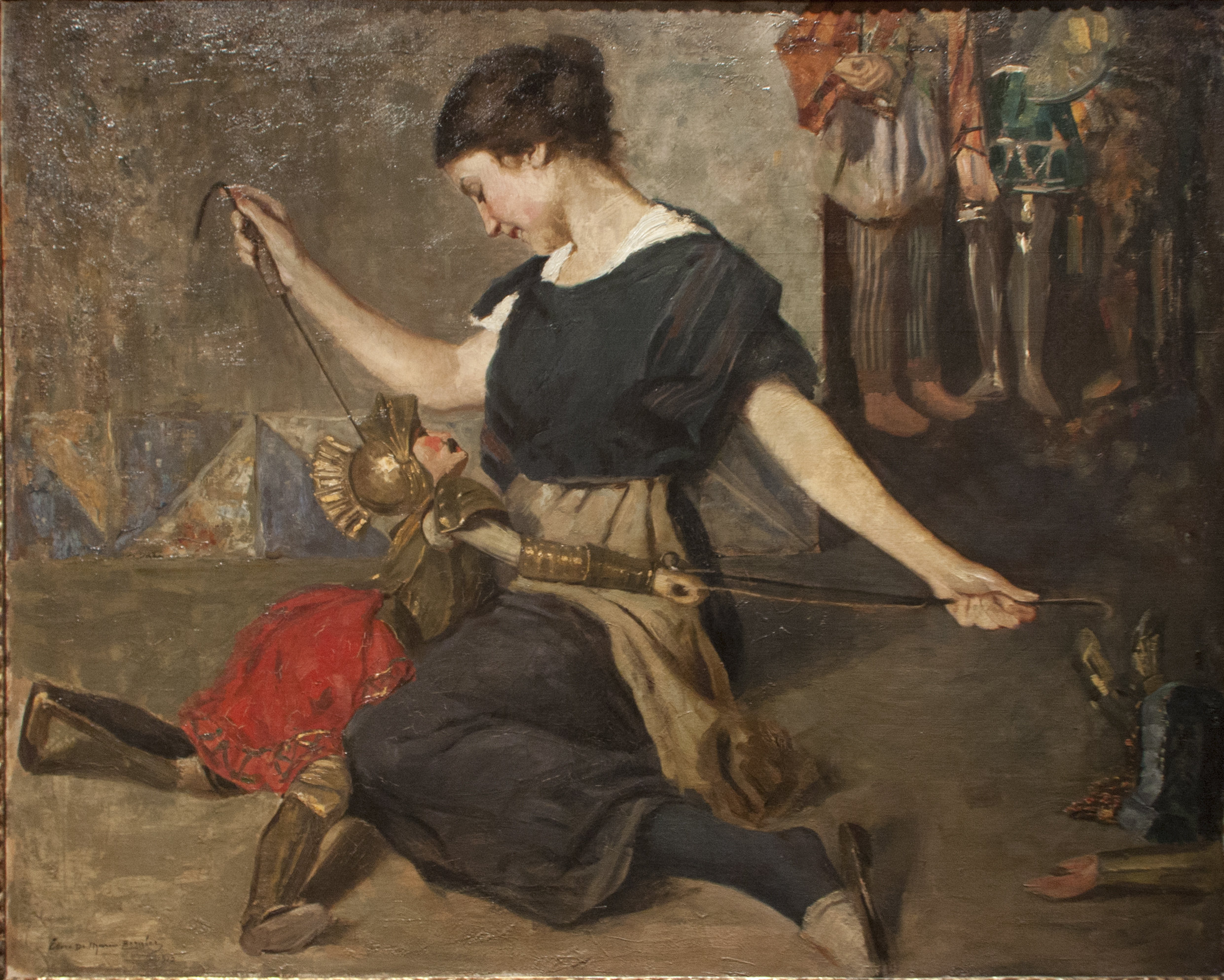
Rinaldo and Armida

He was born in Naples. He trained under Antonio Leto and Francesco Lojacono. His father was a town mayor in Sicily, while his mother was born in Vienna.

He specialized in landscapes, but also did portraits and genre scenes. In Palermo he painted frescoes for the Villa Malfitano Whitaker, and for the Massimo theater between 1899 and 1900. In 1908 he frescoed Liberty-style floral themes for the Grand Hotel Villa Igiea. From 1913 to 1931 he taught figurative painting at the Academy of Fine Arts in Palermo. Among his pupils was Michele Dixitdomino.

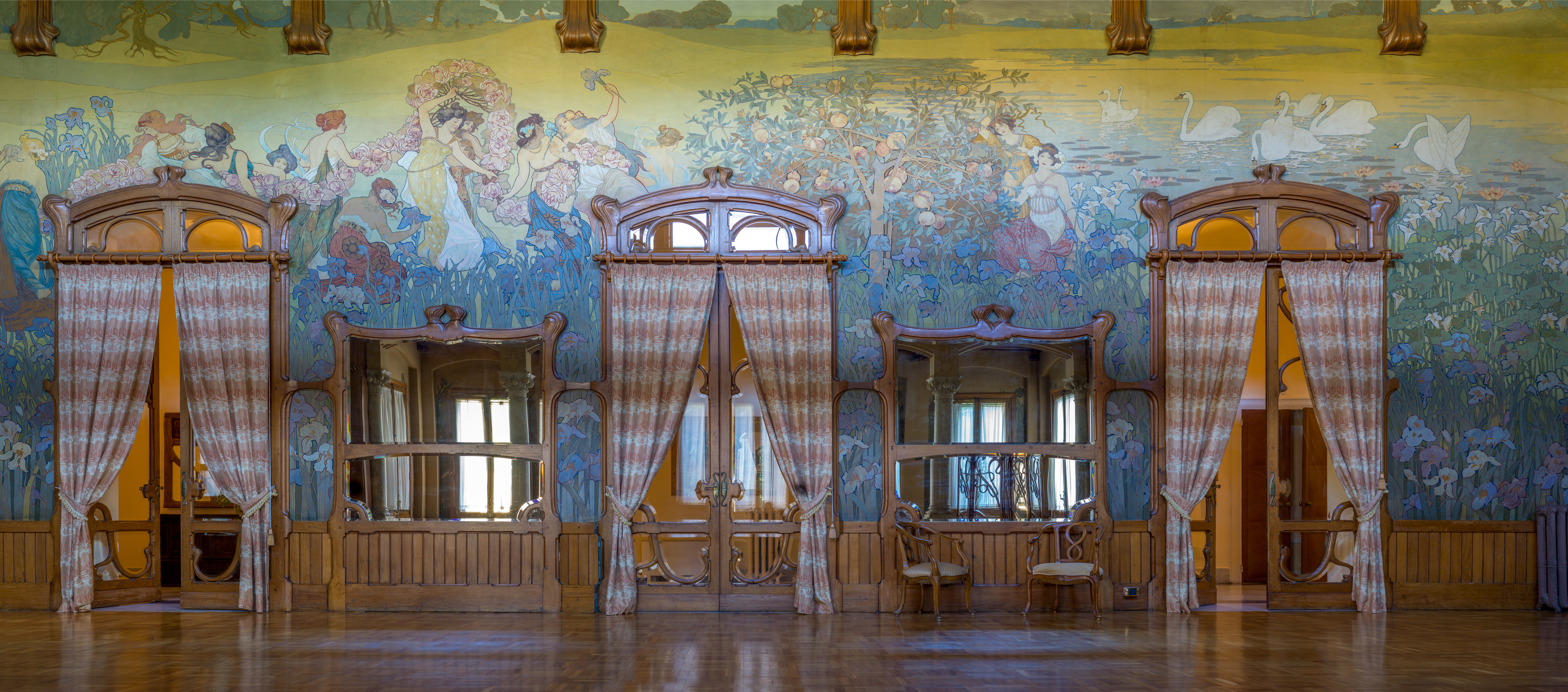
Frescoes for Villa Igiea

== Other projects ==
Media related to Ettore De Maria Bergler at Wikimedia Commons
