= Vincenzo Riolo =

Italian painter (1772–1837)

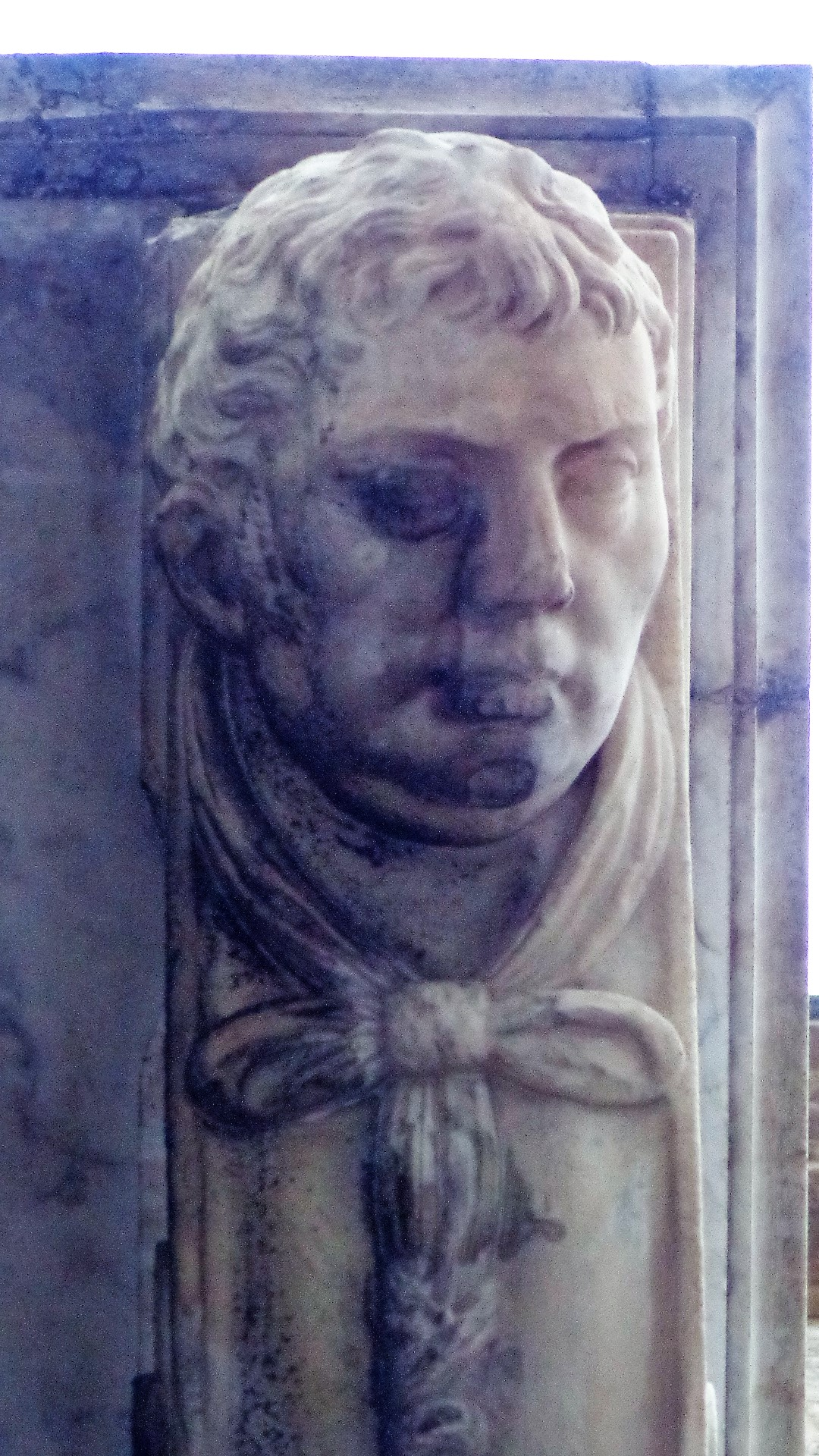

Vincenzo Riolo (February 14, 1772 – July 5, 1837) was an Italian painter of the Neoclassical style, active mainly in his native Sicily.

== Biography ==
He trained in his native Palermo initially with Antonio Manno and Francesco Sozzi, but at the age of twenty moved to Rome to work under Giovanni Battista Wicar. Among his contemporaries in Palermo was Giuseppe Patania.

He married Anna, the daughter of the painter Giuseppe Velasquez in Palermo. In 1828, he replaced his father in law as professor at the Regia Accademia del Nudo in Palermo. Riolo died during the Cholera epidemic of 1837, and was replaced as professor by another pupil of Velasco, Salvatore Lo Forte.

He painted a portrait of his friend, Vincenzo Monti. Among other works, he painted frescoes in the Palazzo Tasca and Gangi, in the Real Casino (Villa) della Favorita, the church of Sant'Ignazio all'Olivella, and the Royal Palace (Reggia) of Ficuzza. He died in 1837 during a cholera epidemic in Palermo.
