= Tamblyn =

Tamblyn is a surname that originates in Cornwall.

Notable people with the surname include:

- Amber Tamblyn (born 1983), American actress and poet
- Christine Tamblyn, American artist
- Doni Tamblyn, American author and comedian
- Eddie Tamblyn (1908–1957), American actor
- Geoff Tamblyn (born 1949), Australian cricketer
- Gordon Tamblyn, founder of the Tamblyn Drugs chain in Canada
- Harold Tamblyn-Watts (1900–1999), British artist
- Hugh Tamblyn (1917–1941), Canadian flying ace
- Ian Tamblyn (born 1947), Canadian folk music singer-songwriter
- Russ Tamblyn (born 1934), American actor
