= 2007 Copa América =

Copa América Venezuela 2007

Tournament details
- Host country: Venezuela
- Dates: 26 June – 15 July
- Teams: 12 (from 2 confederations)
- Venues: 9 (in 9 host cities)

Final positions
- Champions: Brazil (8th title)
- Runners-up: Argentina
- Third place: Mexico
- Fourth place: Uruguay

Tournament statistics
- Matches played: 26
- Goals scored: 86 (3.31 per match)
- Attendance: 1,050,230 (40,393 per match)
- Top scorer: (Brazil) Robinho (6 goals)
- Best player: (Brazil) Robinho
- Best young player: (Argentina) Lionel Messi

The 2007 Campeonato Sudamericano Copa América, known simply as the 2007 Copa América or 2007 Copa América Venezuela, was the 42nd edition of the Copa América, the South-American championship for international association football teams. The competition was organized by CONMEBOL, South America's football governing body, and was held between 26 June and 15 July in Venezuela, which hosted the tournament for the first time.

The competition was won by Brazil (they were also the defending champions), who beat Argentina 3–0 in the final. Mexico took third place by beating Uruguay 3–1 in the third-place match. Brazil thus won the right to represent CONMEBOL at the 2009 FIFA Confederations Cup.

== Competing nations ==
As with previous tournaments, all ten members of CONMEBOL participated in the competition. In order to bring the number of competing teams to twelve, CONMEBOL invited Mexico and the United States, the two highest ranking CONCACAF teams in the FIFA World Rankings. Just as in every tournament since 1993, Mexico accepted the invitation. The United States rejected the invitation due to scheduling conflicts with the 2007 Major League Soccer season. CONMEBOL then proceeded to invite Costa Rica, the third highest CONCACAF team in FIFA's ranking. In the end, the United States accepted the invitation.

- Argentina
- Bolivia
- Brazil (holders)
- Chile
- Colombia
- Ecuador
- Mexico (invitee)
- Paraguay
- Peru
- United States (invitee)
- Uruguay
- Venezuela (hosts)

== Venues ==
For this Copa América, the organizing committee decided to choose eight cities to hold the tournament. A total of 14 cities presented proposal before the committee, of which they rejected proposals from Barquisimeto, Maracay, Valencia, Valera, Portuguesa and Miranda for not meeting established requirements. The cities of Barinas, Caracas, Ciudad Guayana, Maracaibo, Maturín, Mérida, Puerto la Cruz and San Cristóbal were selected to host the tournament. Later on, the organizing committee reconsidered the candidacy of Barquisimeto, based on the proposal of a new stadium to be built for the city. With a final nine host cities, the 2007 edition broke the previous records for host cities set by the 2004 Copa América in Peru, which used seven.

Maturín	Barquisimeto	Mérida	Ciudad Guayana
Estadio Monumental de Maturín	Estadio Metropolitano de Lara	Estadio Metropolitano de Mérida	Estadio Polideportivo Cachamay
Capacity: 52,000	Capacity: 42,000	Capacity: 42,000	Capacity: 41,600
Maracaibo	Location of the host cities of the 2007 Copa America.		
Estadio José Pachencho Romero	Location of the host cities of the 2007 Copa America.		
Capacity: 40,000	Location of the host cities of the 2007 Copa America.		
San Cristóbal	Puerto la Cruz	Barinas	Caracas
Estadio Polideportivo de Pueblo Nuevo	Estadio Olímpico Luis Ramos	Estadio Agustín Tovar	Estadio Olímpico de la UCV
Capacity: 40,000	Capacity: 38,000	Capacity: 27,500	Capacity: 24,900

== Officials ==
On 30 May 2007, CONMEBOL announced the list of match officials for the competition. The list included one match official from every country (except Paraguay, which had two). From these thirteen, six officiated in the 2006 FIFA World Cup: Carlos Simon, Óscar Ruiz, Carlos Amarilla, Jorge Larrionda, and Armando Archundia.

- (Chile) Carlos Chandía
- (Argentina) Sergio Pezzotta
- (Bolivia) René Ortubé
- (Brazil) Carlos Simon
- (Colombia) Óscar Ruiz
- (Ecuador) Mauricio Reinoso
- (Mexico) Armando Archundia
- (Paraguay) Carlos Amarilla
- (Paraguay) Carlos Torres
- (Peru) Víctor Rivera
- (Uruguay) Jorge Larrionda
- (United States) Baldomero Toledo
- (Venezuela) Manuel Andarcia

== Draw ==
The draw for the competition took place on 14 February 2007 in the Teresa Carreño Theater in Caracas.

Pot 1	Pot 2	Pot 3	Pot 4
Venezuela (hosts); Argentina; Brazil	Ecuador; Paraguay; Uruguay	Chile; Colombia; Peru	Bolivia; Mexico (invitee); United States (invitee)

== Squads ==
Each association had to present a list of twenty-three players to compete in the competition.

== Group stage ==
The first round, or group stage, saw the twelve teams divided into three groups of four teams. Each group was a round-robin of six games, where each team played one match against each of the other teams in the same group. Teams were awarded three points for a win, one point for a draw and none for a defeat. The teams finishing first, second and two best-placed third teams in each group qualified for the Quarter-finals.

Tie-breaking criteria

Teams were ranked on the following criteria:

1. Greater number of points in all group matches
2. Goal difference in all group matches
3. Greater number of goals scored in all group matches
4. Head-to-head results
5. Drawing of lots by the CONMEBOL Organising Committee

Key to colors in group tables
Group winners, runners-up, and best two third-placed teams advance to the quarterfinals

All times are in Venezuela Standard Time (UTC–4).

=== Group A ===
Team	Pld	W	D	L	GF	GA	GD	Pts
Venezuela	3	1	2	0	4	2	+2	5
Peru	3	1	1	1	5	4	+1	4
Uruguay	3	1	1	1	1	3	−2	4
Bolivia	3	0	2	1	4	5	−1	2

26 June 2007
18:05

Uruguay	0–3	Peru
	Report	Villalta 27'; Mariño 70'; Guerrero 88'

Estadio Metropolitano de Mérida, Mérida
Attendance: 23,000
Referee: Carlos Amarilla (Paraguay)
26 June 2007
20:50

Venezuela	2–2	Bolivia
Maldonado 20'; Páez 55'	Report	Moreno 38'; Arce 84'

Estadio Polideportivo de Pueblo Nuevo, San Cristóbal
Attendance: 40,000
Referee: Mauricio Reinoso (Ecuador)

30 June 2007
16:05

Bolivia	0–1	Uruguay
	Report	Sánchez 58'

Estadio Polideportivo de Pueblo Nuevo, San Cristóbal
Attendance: 40,000
Referee: Baldomero Toledo (United States)
30 June 2007
18:20

Venezuela	2–0	Peru
Cichero 48'; Arismendi 79'	Report

Estadio Polideportivo de Pueblo Nuevo, San Cristóbal
Attendance: 40,000
Referee: Benito Archundia (Mexico)

3 July 2007
18:35

Peru	2–2	Bolivia
Pizarro 34', 85'	Report	Moreno 24'; Campos 45'

Estadio Metropolitano de Mérida, Mérida
Attendance: 42,000
Referee: Carlos Chandía (Chile)
3 July 2007
20:50

Venezuela	0–0	Uruguay
	Report

Estadio Metropolitano de Mérida, Mérida
Attendance: 42,000
Referee: Carlos Simon (Brazil)

=== Group B ===
Team	Pld	W	D	L	GF	GA	GD	Pts
Mexico	3	2	1	0	4	1	+3	7
Brazil	3	2	0	1	4	2	+2	6
Chile	3	1	1	1	3	5	−2	4
Ecuador	3	0	0	3	3	6	−3	0

27 June 2007
18:35

Ecuador	2–3	Chile
Valencia 16'; Benítez 23'	Report	Suazo 20', 80'; Villanueva 86'

Polideportivo Cachamay, Ciudad Guayana
Attendance: 35,000
Referee: Óscar Ruiz (Colombia)
27 June 2007
20:50

Brazil	0–2	Mexico
	Report	Castillo 23'; Morales 28'

Polideportivo Cachamay, Ciudad Guayana
Attendance: 40,000
Referee: Sergio Pezzotta (Argentina)

1 July 2007
16:05

Brazil	3–0	Chile
Robinho 36' (pen.), 84', 87'	Report

Estadio Monumental de Maturín, Maturín
Attendance: 52,000
Referee: Carlos Torres (Paraguay)
1 July 2007
18:20

Mexico	2–1	Ecuador
Castillo 21'; Bravo 79'	Report	Méndez 84'

Estadio Monumental de Maturín, Maturín
Attendance: 52,000
Referee: René Ortubé (Bolivia)

4 July 2007
18:35

Mexico	0–0	Chile
	Report

Estadio Olímpico Luis Ramos, Puerto la Cruz
Attendance: 38,000
Referee: Carlos Amarilla (Paraguay)
4 July 2007
20:50

Brazil	1–0	Ecuador
Robinho 56' (pen.)	Report

Estadio Olímpico Luis Ramos, Puerto la Cruz
Attendance: 38,000
Referee: Sergio Pezzotta (Argentina)

=== Group C ===
Team	Pld	W	D	L	GF	GA	GD	Pts
Argentina	3	3	0	0	9	3	+6	9
Paraguay	3	2	0	1	8	2	+6	6
Colombia	3	1	0	2	3	9	−6	3
United States	3	0	0	3	2	8	−6	0

28 June 2007
18:35

Paraguay	5–0	Colombia
Santa Cruz 30', 46', 80'; Cabañas 84', 88'	Report

Estadio José Pachencho Romero, Maracaibo
Attendance: 34,500
Referee: Jorge Larrionda (Uruguay)
28 June 2007
20:50

Argentina	4–1	United States
Crespo 11', 60'; Aimar 76'; Tevez 84'	Report	Johnson 9' (pen.)

Estadio José Pachencho Romero, Maracaibo
Attendance: 34,500
Referee: Carlos Chandía (Chile)

2 July 2007
18:35

United States	1–3	Paraguay
Clark 35'	Report	Barreto 29'; Cardozo 56'; Cabañas 90+2'

Estadio Agustín Tovar, Barinas
Attendance: 28,200
Referee: Victor Rivera (Peru)
2 July 2007
20:50

Argentina	4–2	Colombia
Crespo 20' (pen.); Riquelme 34', 45'; D. Milito 90+1'	Report	E. Perea 10'; Castrillón 76'

Estadio José Pachencho Romero, Maracaibo
Attendance: 40,000
Referee: Carlos Simon (Brazil)

5 July 2007
18:35

Colombia	1–0	United States
Castrillón 15'	Report

Estadio Metropolitano de Lara, Barquisimeto
Attendance: 37,500
Referee: Manuel Andarcia (Venezuela)
5 July 2007
20:50

Argentina	1–0	Paraguay
Mascherano 79'	Report

Estadio Metropolitano de Lara, Barquisimeto
Attendance: 37,500
Referee: Jorge Larrionda (Uruguay)

=== Ranking of third-placed teams ===
At the end of the first stage, a comparison was made between the third-placed teams of each group. The two best third-placed teams advanced to the quarter-finals.

Grp	Team	Pld	W	D	L	GF	GA	GD	Pts
B	Chile	3	1	1	1	3	5	−2	4
A	Uruguay	3	1	1	1	1	3	−2	4
C	Colombia	3	1	0	2	3	9	−6	3

== Knockout stage ==
=== Bracket ===
Quarter-finals
7 July – San Cristóbal
Venezuela	1
Uruguay	4
7 July – Puerto la Cruz
Chile	1
Brazil	6
8 July – Maturín
Mexico	6
Paraguay	0
8 July – Barquisimeto
Argentina	4
Peru	0

Semi-finals
10 July – Maracaibo
Uruguay	2 (4)
Brazil (p)	2 (5)
11 July – Ciudad Guayana
Mexico	0
Argentina	3

Final
15 July – Maracaibo
Brazil	3
Argentina	0
Third place
14 July – Caracas
Uruguay	1
Mexico	3

=== Quarter-finals ===
7 July 2007
18:05

Venezuela	1–4	Uruguay
Arango 41'	Report	Forlán 38', 90+1'; García 64'; Rodríguez 86'

Estadio Polideportivo de Pueblo Nuevo, San Cristóbal
Attendance: 41,200
Referee: Carlos Chandía (Chile)

7 July 2007
20:50

Chile	1–6	Brazil
Suazo 76'	Report	Juan 16'; Baptista 23'; Robinho 27', 50'; Josué 68'; Vágner Love 85'

Estadio Olímpico Luis Ramos, Puerto la Cruz
Attendance: 38,000
Referee: Jorge Larrionda (Uruguay)

8 July 2007
16:05

Mexico	6–0	Paraguay
Castillo 5' (pen.), 38'; Torrado 27'; Arce 79'; Blanco 87' (pen.); Bravo 90+1'	Report

Estadio Monumental de Maturín, Maturín
Attendance: 52,000
Referee: Sergio Pezzotta (Argentina)

8 July 2007
18:50

Argentina	4–0	Peru
Riquelme 47', 85'; Messi 61'; Mascherano 75'	Report

Estadio Metropolitano de Lara, Barquisimeto
Attendance: 38,800
Referee: Carlos Simon (Brazil)

=== Semi-finals ===
10 July 2007
20:50

Uruguay	2–2	Brazil
Forlán 36'; Abreu 69'	Report	Maicon 13'; Baptista 41'
Penalties
Forlán (penalty missed); Scotti (penalty scored); González (penalty scored); C. Rodríguez (penalty scored); Abreu (penalty scored); García (penalty missed); Lugano (penalty missed)	4–5	(penalty scored) Robinho; (penalty scored) Juan; (penalty scored) Gilberto Silva; (penalty missed) Afonso Alves; (penalty scored) Diego; (penalty missed) Fernando; (penalty scored) Gilberto

Estadio José Pachencho Romero, Maracaibo
Attendance: 38,100
Referee: Óscar Ruiz (Colombia)

11 July 2007
20:50

Mexico	0–3	Argentina
	Report	Heinze 45'; Messi 61'; Riquelme 65' (pen.)

Polideportivo Cachamay, Ciudad Guayana
Attendance: 41,600
Referee: Carlos Chandía (Chile)

=== Third-place match ===
14 July 2007
17:05

Uruguay	1–3	Mexico
Abreu 22'	Report	Blanco 36' (pen.); Bravo 68'; Guardado 76'

Estadio Olímpico de la UCV, Caracas
Attendance: 25,000
Referee: Mauricio Reinoso (Ecuador)

=== Final ===
15 July 2007
17:05

Brazil	3–0	Argentina
Baptista 4'; Ayala 40' (o.g.); Dani Alves 69'	Report

Estadio José Pachencho Romero, Maracaibo
Attendance: 40,000
Referee: Carlos Amarilla (Paraguay)

== Result ==
2007 Copa América champions

Brazil
8th title

== Awards ==
- Best player (Golden Ball): (Brazil) Robinho
- Top scorer (Golden Boot): (Brazil) Robinho
- Best young player: (Argentina) Lionel Messi

=== All-Star Team ===
The All-Star Team was selected by the CONMEBOL Technical Study Group.

Goalkeepers	Defenders	Midfielders	Forwards
(Brazil) Doni	(Argentina) Javier Zanetti (Mexico) Jonny Magallón (Brazil) Juan (Uruguay) Jorge Fucile	(Brazil) Júlio Baptista (Argentina) Javier Mascherano (Argentina) Juan Román Riquelme	(Brazil) Robinho (Mexico) Nery Castillo (Argentina) Lionel Messi

== Controversies ==
=== Messi–Chandía jersey controversy ===
In September 2024, former Chilean referee Carlos Chandía stated in a television interview that he intentionally declined to issue a mandatory yellow card to Argentine forward Lionel Messi during the 2007 Copa América semi-final against Mexico. In the closing minutes of the match, with Argentina holding a 3–0 lead, Messi committed a deliberate handball in the midfield. Because Messi had already been booked, a second yellow card would have resulted in a red card and an automatic suspension from the tournament's final against Brazil.

According to his account, Chandía told Messi he would spare him the booking in exchange for his match-worn jersey. Messi agreed to the arrangement and delivered the shirt to the referee's dressing room after the final whistle. Chandía claimed that complaints from the Brazilian national team about the incident were the reason CONMEBOL officials ultimately did not select him to referee the final. Sports media outlets covering the confession characterized the exchange as an intentional trade and unprofessional behavior from a match official.

== Goalscorers ==
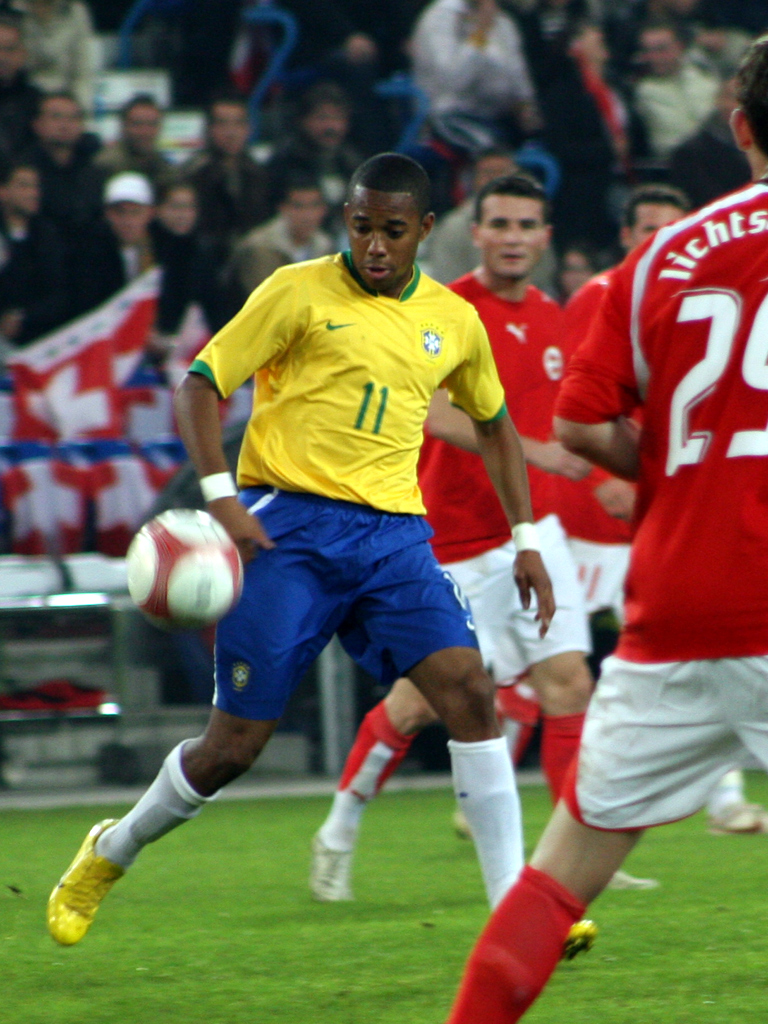
Robinho, top scorer

With six goals, Robinho was the top scorer in the tournament. There were 86 goals scored in 26 matches, for an average of 3.31 goals per match.

6 goals

- (Brazil) Robinho

5 goals

- (Argentina) Juan Román Riquelme

4 goals

- (Mexico) Nery Castillo

3 goals

- (Argentina) Hernán Crespo
- (Brazil) Júlio Baptista
- (Chile) Humberto Suazo
- (Mexico) Omar Bravo
- (Paraguay) Salvador Cabañas
- (Paraguay) Roque Santa Cruz
- (Uruguay) Diego Forlán

2 goals

- (Argentina) Javier Mascherano
- (Argentina) Lionel Messi
- (Bolivia) Jaime Moreno
- (Colombia) Jaime Castrillón
- (Mexico) Cuauhtémoc Blanco
- (Peru) Claudio Pizarro
- (Uruguay) Sebastián Abreu

1 goal

- (Argentina) Pablo Aimar
- (Argentina) Gabriel Heinze
- (Argentina) Diego Milito
- (Argentina) Carlos Tevez
- (Bolivia) Juan Carlos Arce
- (Bolivia) Jhasmani Campos
- (Brazil) Dani Alves
- (Brazil) Josué
- (Brazil) Juan
- (Brazil) Vágner Love
- (Brazil) Maicon
- (Chile) Carlos Villanueva
- (Colombia) Edixon Perea
- (Ecuador) Christian Benítez
- (Ecuador) Édison Méndez
- (Ecuador) Antonio Valencia
- (Mexico) Fernando Arce
- (Mexico) Andrés Guardado
- (Mexico) Ramón Morales
- (Mexico) Gerardo Torrado
- (Paraguay) Édgar Barreto
- (Paraguay) Óscar Cardozo
- (Peru) Paolo Guerrero
- (Peru) Juan Carlos Mariño
- (Peru) Miguel Villalta
- (United States) Ricardo Clark
- (United States) Eddie Johnson
- (Uruguay) Pablo García
- (Uruguay) Cristian Rodríguez
- (Uruguay) Vicente Sánchez
- (Venezuela) Juan Arango
- (Venezuela) Daniel Arismendi
- (Venezuela) Alejandro Cichero
- (Venezuela) Giancarlo Maldonado
- (Venezuela) Ricardo Páez

1 own goal

- (Argentina) Roberto Ayala (against Brazil)

=== Team of the Tournament ===
Goalkeeper	Defenders	Midfielders	Forwards
(Brazil) Doni	(Argentina) Javier Zanetti (Mexico) Jonny Magallón (Brazil) Juan (Uruguay) Jorge Fucile	(Brazil) Júlio Baptista (Argentina) Javier Mascherano (Argentina) Juan Román Riquelme	(Brazil) Robinho (Mexico) Nery Castillo (Argentina) Lionel Messi

== Final positions ==
Pos	Team	Pld	W	D	L	GF	GA	GD	Pts	Eff
1	Brazil	6	4	1	1	15	5	+10	13	72.2%
2	Argentina	6	5	0	1	16	6	+10	15	83.3%
3	Mexico	6	4	1	1	13	5	+8	13	72.2%
4	Uruguay	6	2	2	2	8	9	−1	8	44.4%
Eliminated in the quarterfinals
5	Paraguay	4	2	0	2	8	8	0	6	50.0%
6	Venezuela	4	1	2	1	5	6	−1	5	41.6%
7	Peru	4	1	1	2	5	8	−3	4	33.3%
8	Chile	4	1	1	2	4	11	−7	4	33.3%
Eliminated in the first round
9	Colombia	3	1	0	2	3	9	−6	3	33.3%
10	Bolivia	3	0	2	1	4	5	−1	2	22.2%
11	Ecuador	3	0	0	3	3	6	−3	0	0.0%
12	United States	3	0	0	3	2	8	−6	0	0.0%

== Marketing ==
=== Sponsorship ===
Global Platinum Sponsor

- LG
- MasterCard

Global Gold Sponsor

- Telefónica (Movistar is the brand advertised)

Global Silver Sponsor

- Casio
- Anheuser-Busch InBev (Skol is the brand advertised)

Charitable Partner

- UNICEF

Local Supplier

- PDVSA
- Empresas Polar (Maltin Polar is the brand advertised)
- Ole Ole
- Traffic Group

=== Match ball ===
The official match ball for the tournament was the Nike Mercurial Veloci. The ball was presented on 14 February 2007, prior to a friendly match played between Venezuela and New Zealand, by the president of the Venezuelan Football Federation, Rafael Esquivel, to the mayor of Maracaibo, Giancarlo Di Martino – head of the local organising committee.

=== Mascot ===
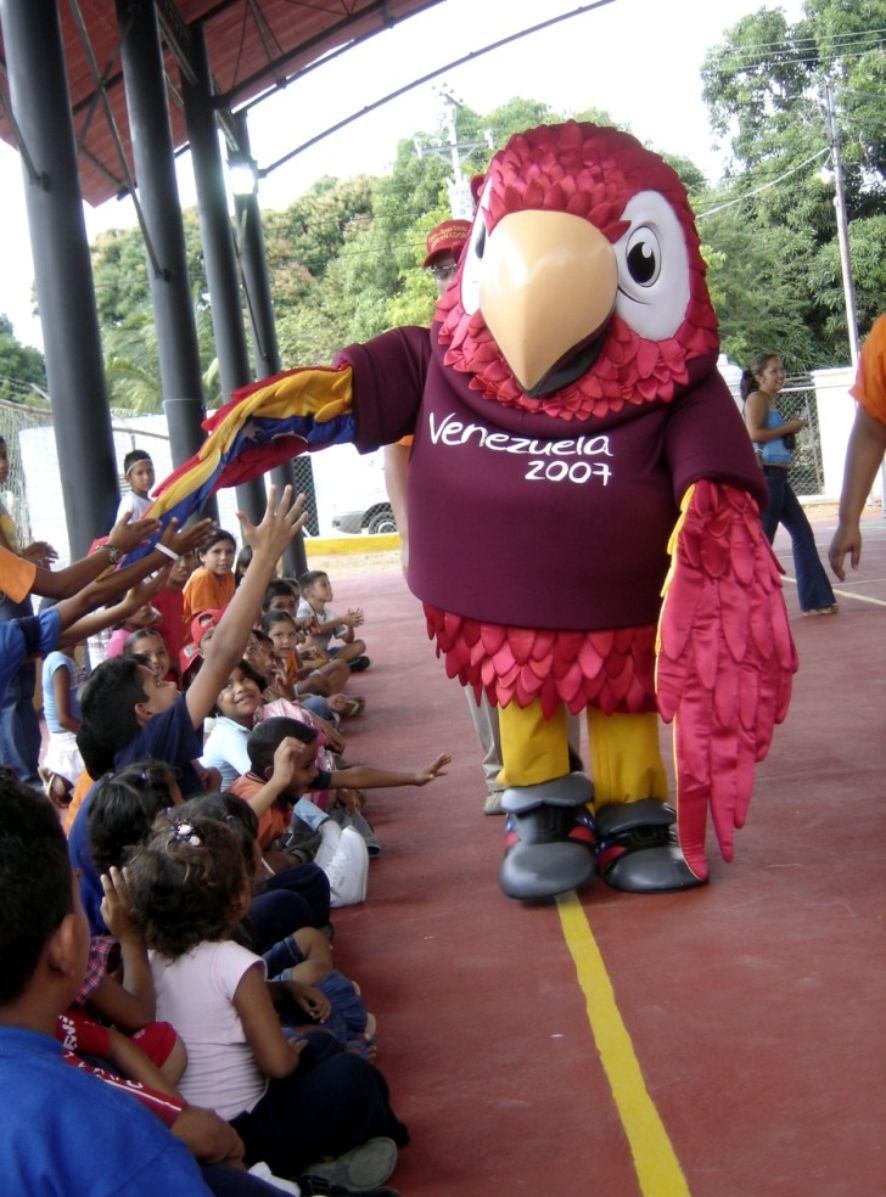
Guaky suit manufactured by Fractal Studio, through the main cities of Venezuela

Guaky is a scarlet macaw, a bird representative of Venezuela. He wore the traditional jersey Venezuela national football team burgundy and football shoes. Under their wings the characteristic tricolor national flag, with its eight stars on their wings.

To choose the official mascot held a contest in which proposals received 4,500,000 of Venezuelan children and adolescents at a school. The winning draw corresponded to the 15-year-old Jhoyling Zabaleta. The final design was commissioned to Fractal Studio, bring life and a "strong personality, cheerful and sport" that accompanied the event during its realization. The name of the pet, Guaky was subsequently elected by an online survey, where that option was a 54.17% of preferences.

=== Theme songs ===
- "Gol" by Venezuelan singer Juan Carlos Luces, was the main theme song of the tournament, which was performed during the draw and the opening ceremonies.
- "Baila la Copa" by Venezuelan singer Ose was an official anthem for the tournament.
