= Gordon Tamblyn =

Australian cricketer

Personal information
- Born: 23 April 1918; Wallaroo Mines, Australia
- Died: 31 December 2001 (aged 83); Melbourne, Australia

Domestic team information
- Years: Team
- 1939-1947: Victoria
- Source: Cricinfo, 29 November 2015

Gordon Tamblyn (23 April 1918 – 31 December 2001) was an Australian cricketer. He played 21 first-class cricket matches for Victoria between 1939 and 1947. His cricketing accomplishments included racking up 19 centuries in games for St. Kilda. He was the father of Cricket Victoria manager and cricketer Geoff Tamblyn.

== See also ==
- List of Victoria first-class cricketers
