= La Guaricha Zoo =

La Guaricha Zoo Parque Zoológico La Guaricha
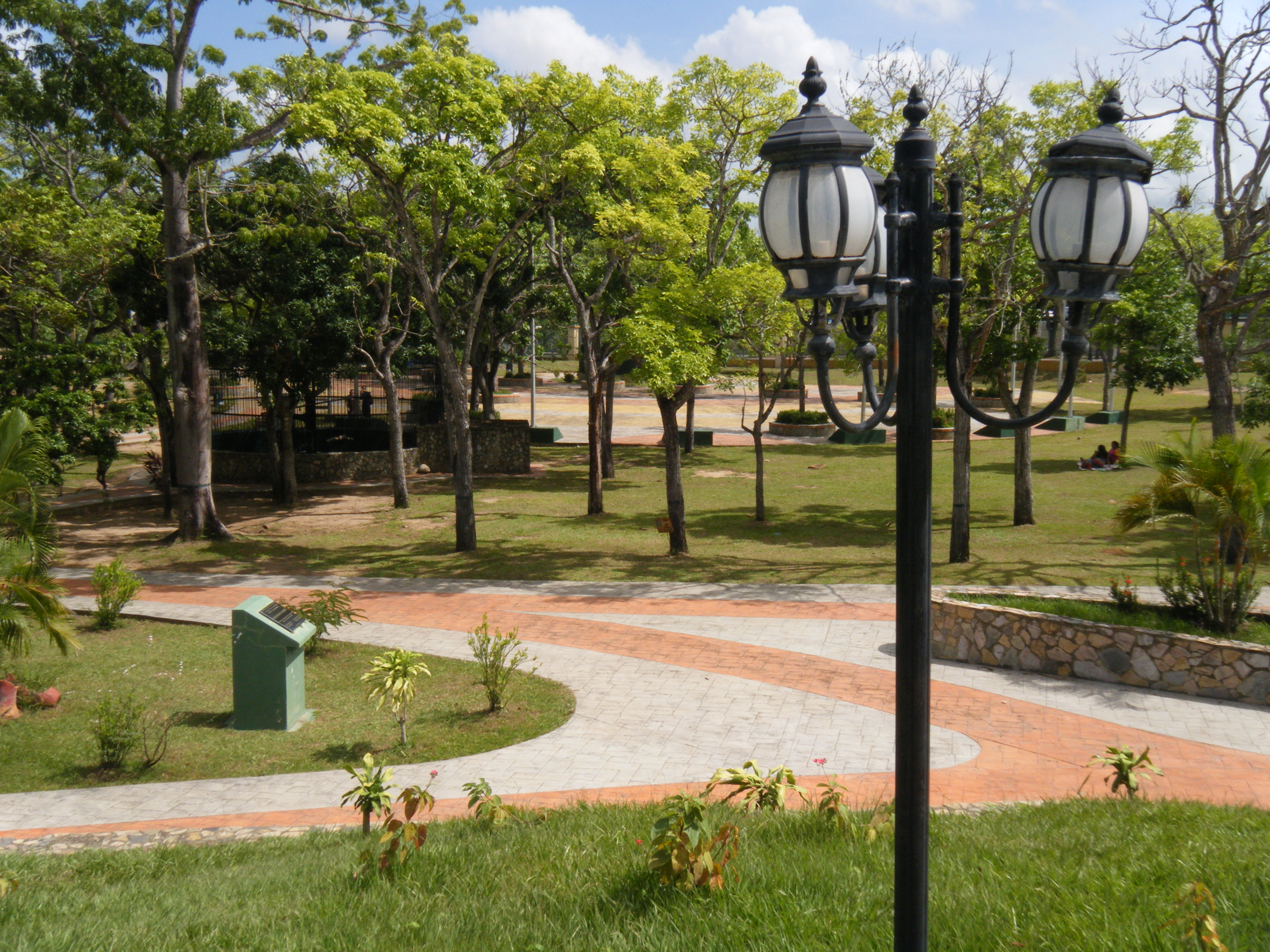
- Interactive map of La Guaricha Zoo; Parque Zoológico La Guaricha
- 9°44′30″N 63°09′53″W
- Date opened: 1979
- Location: Maturín, Venezuela

The La Guaricha Zoo (Spanish: Parque Zoológico La Guaricha) Also Zoological Park of La Guaricha Is an urban zoo located less than 400 meters from the center of the city of Maturín, Monagas in Venezuela with native species of the region and the rest of Venezuela. The Municipality of Maturín maintains the rectory of the park and the Governorate of Monagas state assumes some administrative responsibility to support the programs that are developed in him.

The name "La Guaricha" was given to the park since it is used to refer to children and is a very indigenous term and typical of this region.

Previously the only zoological garden of Maturín was the park Menca de Leoni; Until, after a period between 1976 and 1978, the construction of the park La Guaricha, by initiative of the Municipal Council of the Maturín District, during the first government of Carlos Andrés Pérez, culminates. It opened its doors to the public for the first time in 1979 and was renovated in 1993.

The park has an artificial lagoon with lagoon walks, a children's playground and a soda fountain, as well as a selection of animals such as: a jaguar, a puma, deer, owls, cranes, toucans, capybaras, alligators, Macaws, peacocks, among others.

== Gallery ==
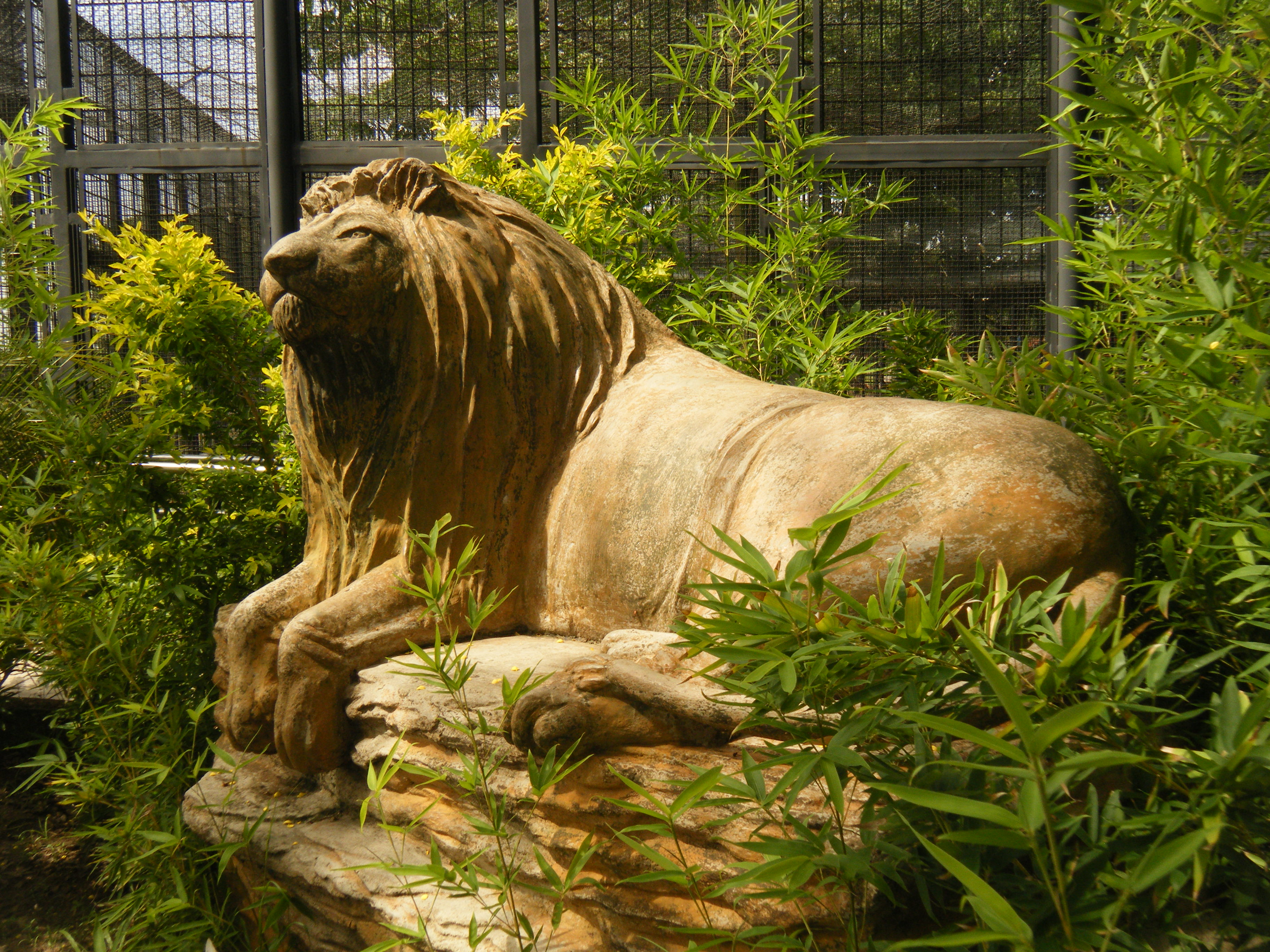

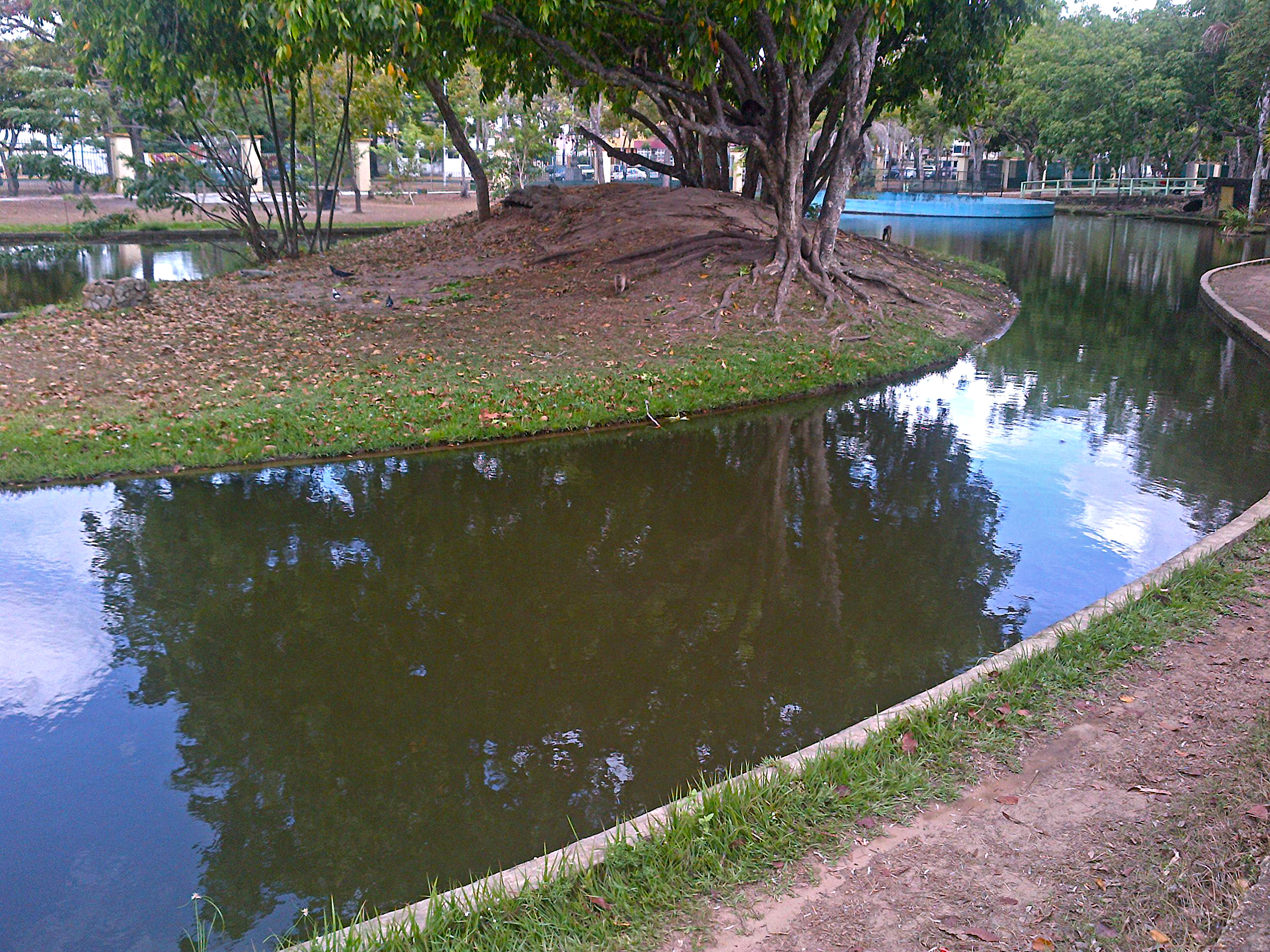

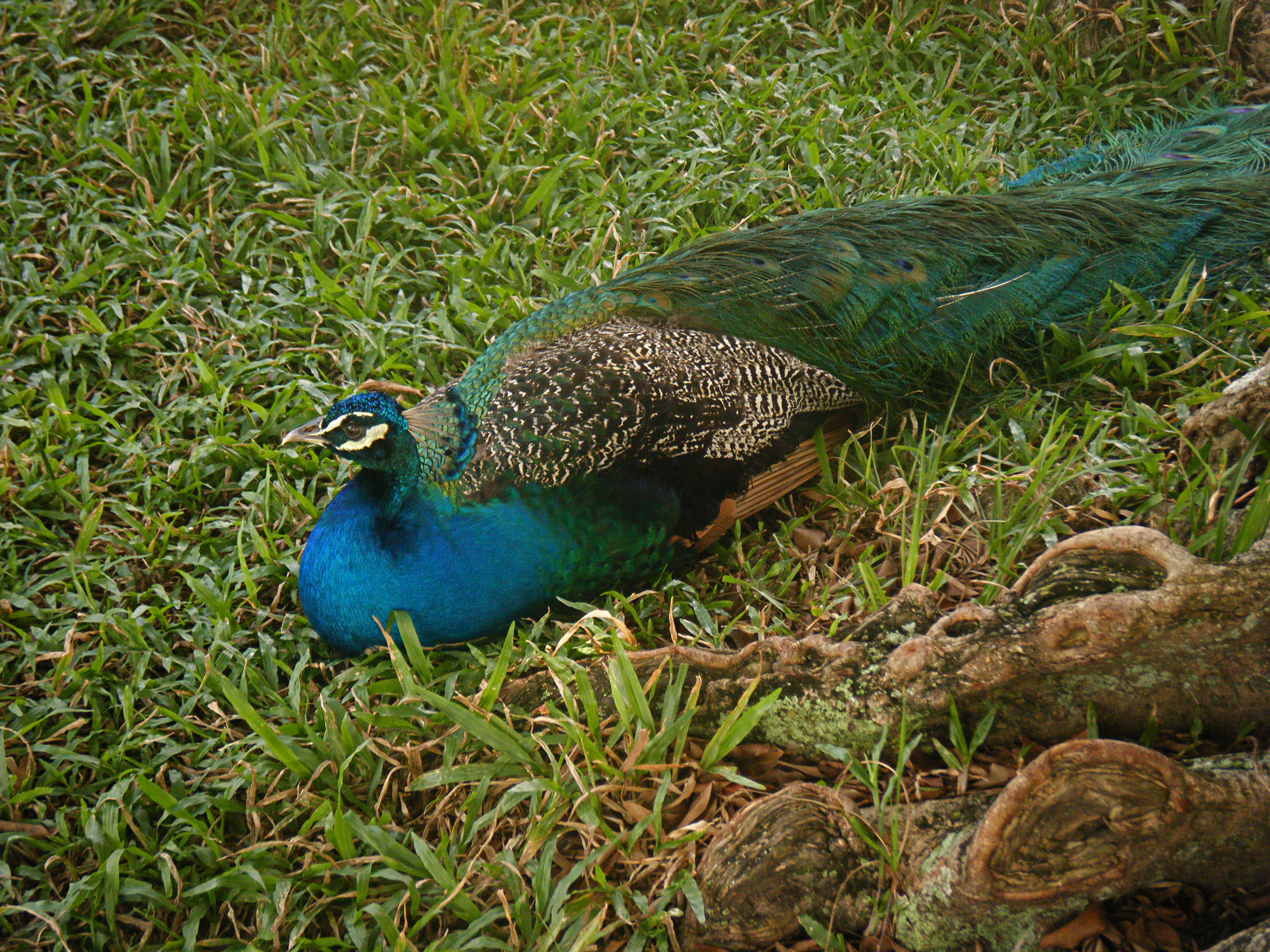

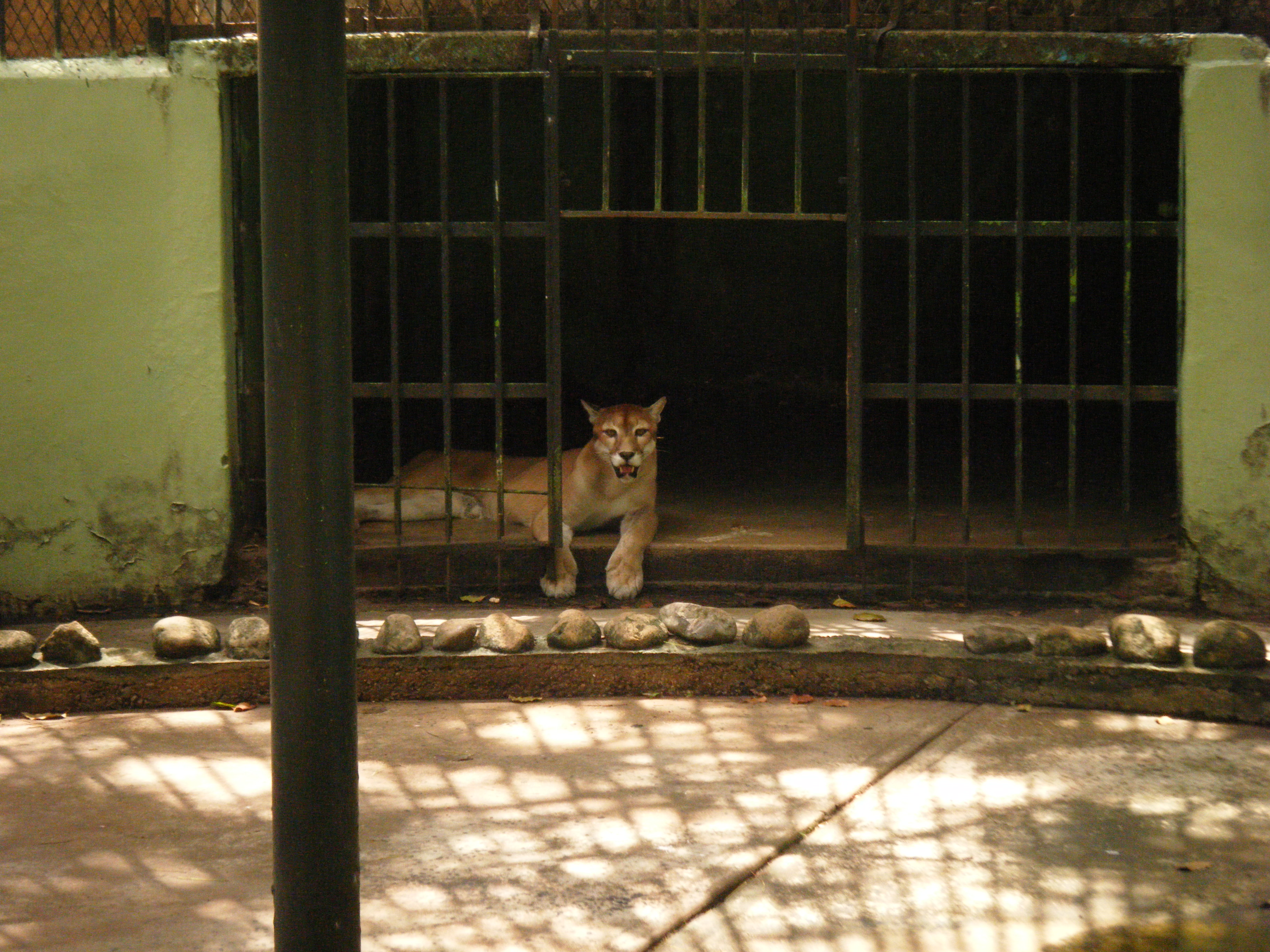

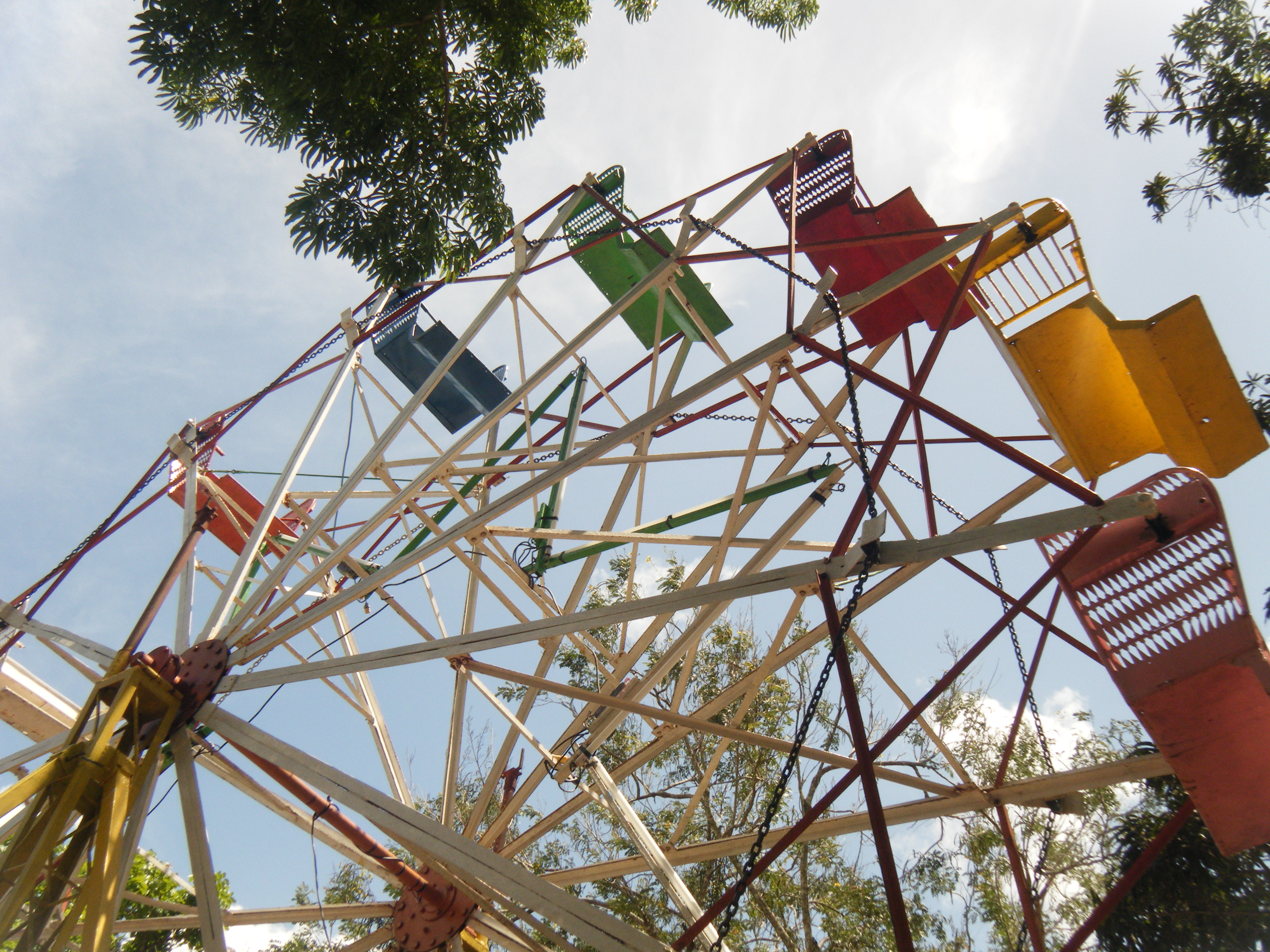

== See also ==
- List of national parks of Venezuela
- El Pinar Zoo
