= Doni =

Doni may refer to:

== Entertainment ==
- Doni (Bulgarian singer) (born 1967), Bulgarian pop singer and actor
- Doni (Russian singer) (born 1985, Дони), Russian-Uzbeki rapper
- Doni Tamblyn (born 1952), American writer
- Doni Tondo or Doni Madonna, a 1507 painting by Michelangelo
- Portrait of Maddalena Doni (Raphael), a painting by Raphael
- Giovanni Battista Doni (c. 1593–1647), Italian musicologist
- Doni (film), a 2013 Sri Lankan children's drama film

== Sports ==
- Doni (footballer) (born 1979), Brazilian international footballer
- Cristiano Doni (born 1973), Italian footballer

== Other ==
- Doni (letter), a Georgian letter
- Doni River, a river in India
- Alternative spelling of Dhoni, a Maldivian sailing boat
