= Cathedral of Our Lady of Mount Carmel, Maturín =

Cathedral of Our Lady of Mount Carmel
- Catedral de Nuestra Señora del Carmen de Maturín
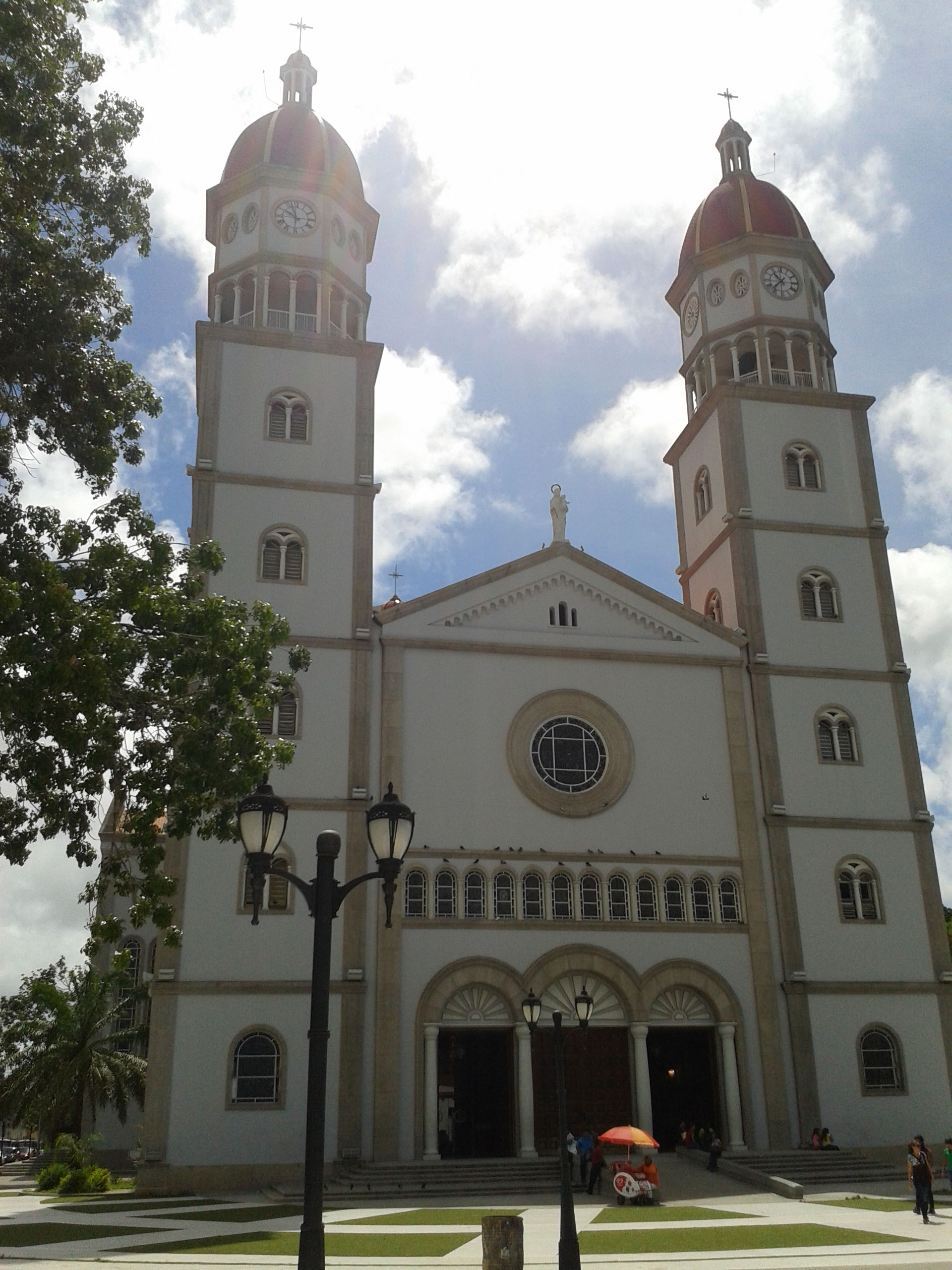
- Cathedral of Our Lady of Mount Carmel
- 9.7451°N 63.1721°W
- Location: Maturín
- Country: Venezuela
- Denomination: Roman Catholic Church

Architecture
- Style: Romanesque architecture
- Years built: 1959–1981

Administration
- Diocese: Roman Catholic Diocese of Maturín

The Cathedral of Our Lady of Mount Carmel (or Cathedral of Maturín; Spanish: Catedral de Nuestra Señora del Carmen de Maturín) is a Catholic church located in Maturín, Monagas State, Venezuela. It is one of the largest and best decorated churches in the country, and its domes are the second highest in Latin America, preceded by the Basilica of Our Lady of Guadalupe in Mexico.

Its construction began on July 16, 1959, on the day of Our Lady of Mount Carmel, and it was inaugurated 22 years later, on May 23, 1981.

Maturín City Council donated the land where the cathedral was built. The construction supervisor was the then Ministry of Public Works. The project was executed by contractor Francisco Baceta and architect Ernesto Prall, who dealt with the design and preparation of the construction drawings and structure. The execution of the remaining 90% of the work was carried out by Juan Serrano with his construction company.

Due to the lack of budget, the cathedral was completed in 1981. The Ministry of Justice and the Ministry of Urban Development contributed resources. Likewise did the presidents Rómulo Betancourt, Raúl Leoni, Rafael Caldera, Carlos Andrés Pérez and Luis Herrera Campins. The first bishop of the Diocese of Maturín, José Ramirez Antonio Salaverría, fought for resources and to continue construction. The cost of the cathedral was at that time 3 million bolivars.

== See also ==
- Roman Catholicism in Venezuela
- Our Lady of Mount Carmel

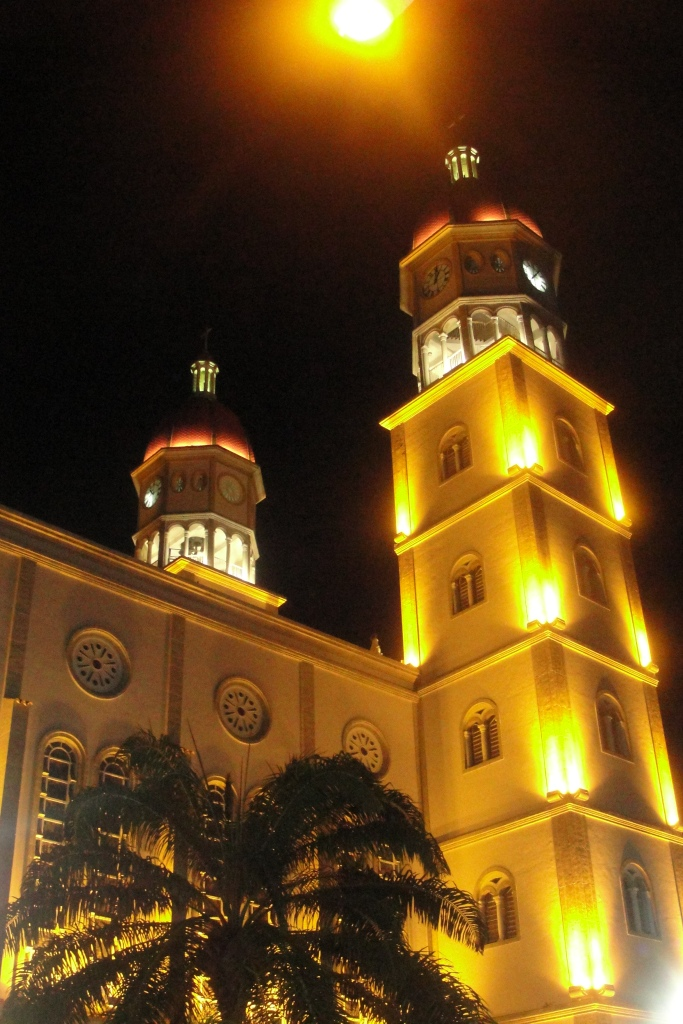
nocturnal view
