= Maturín =

Maturín The Sultana of Guarapiche
- Municipality
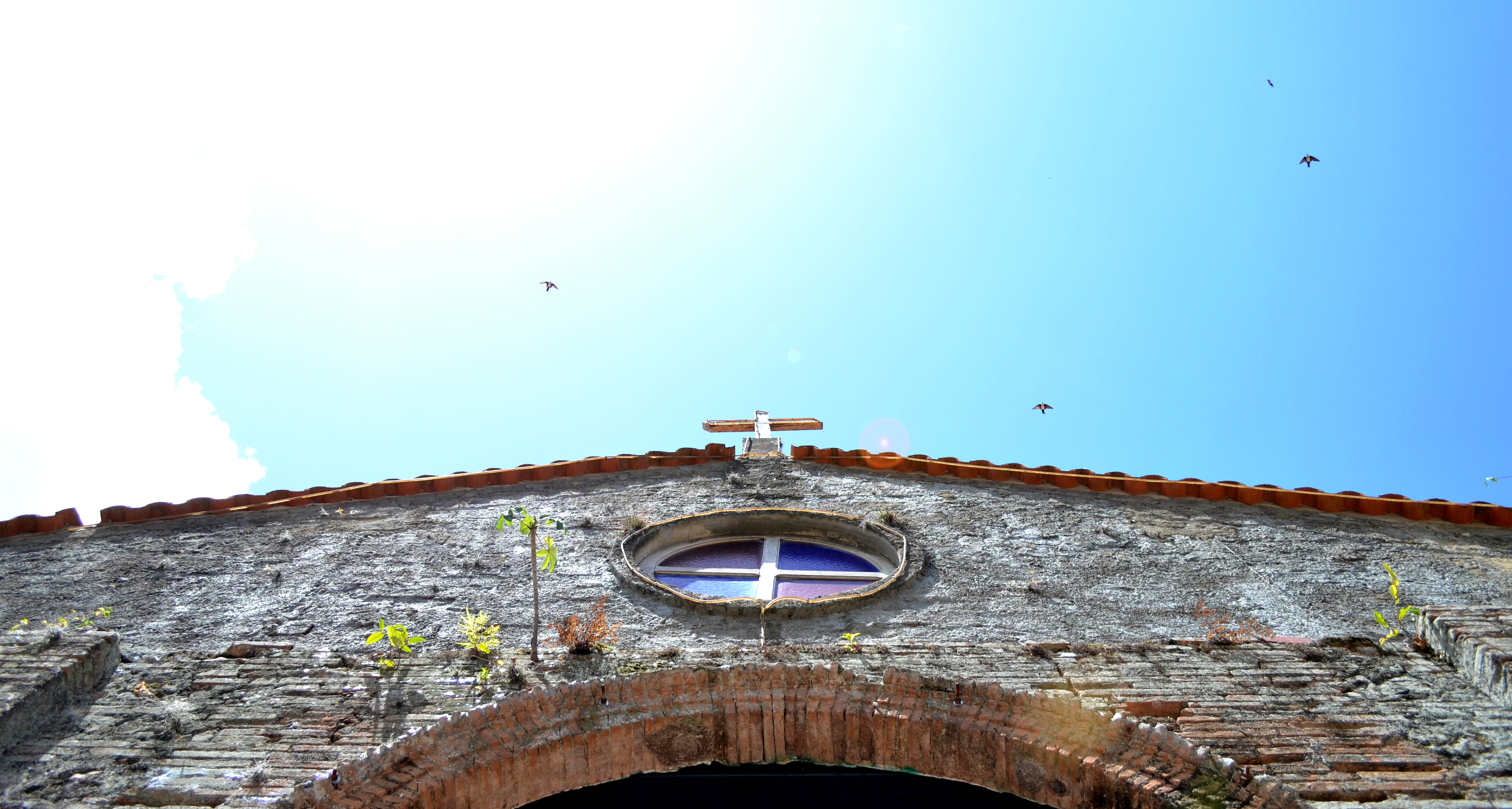
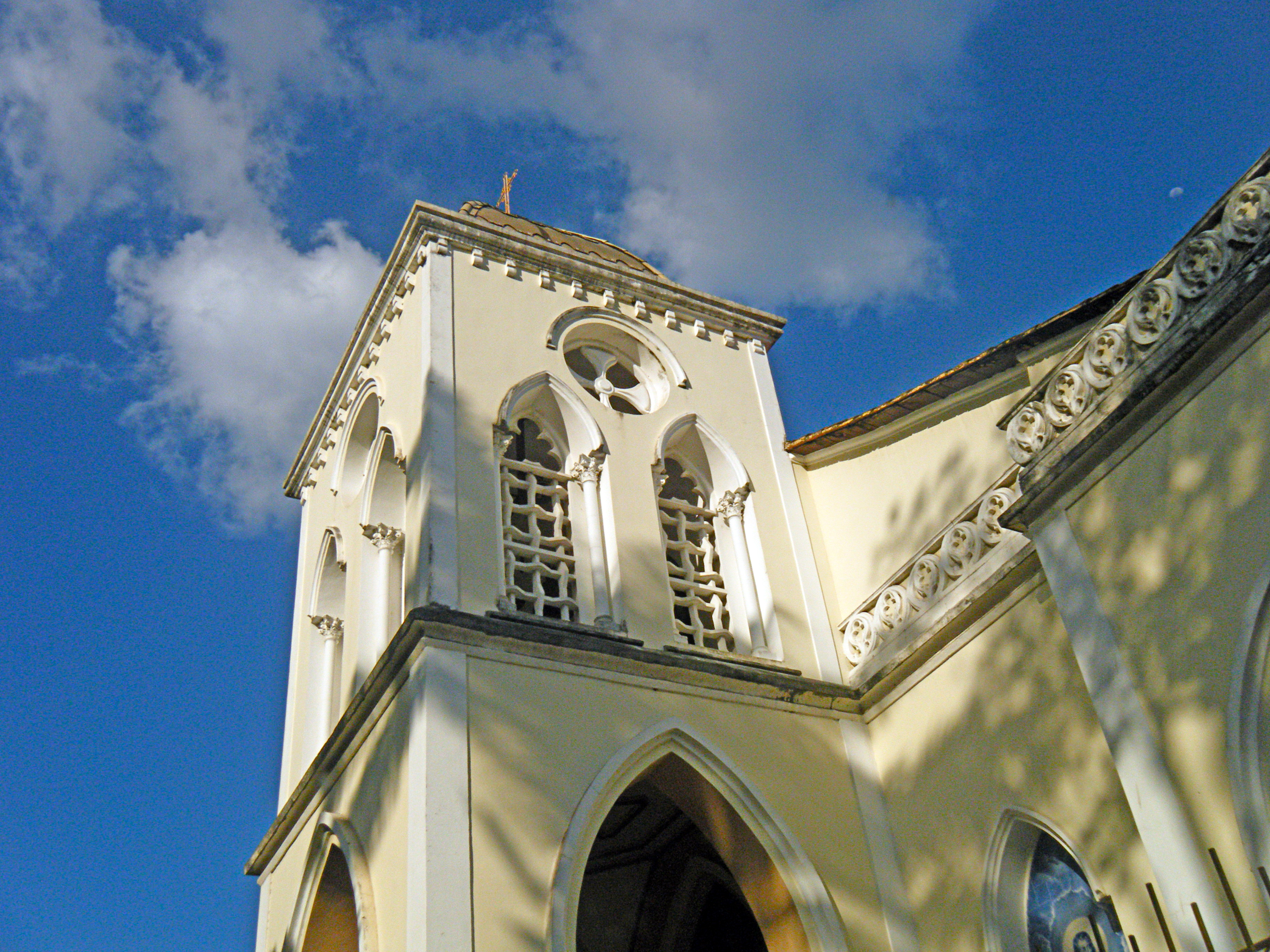
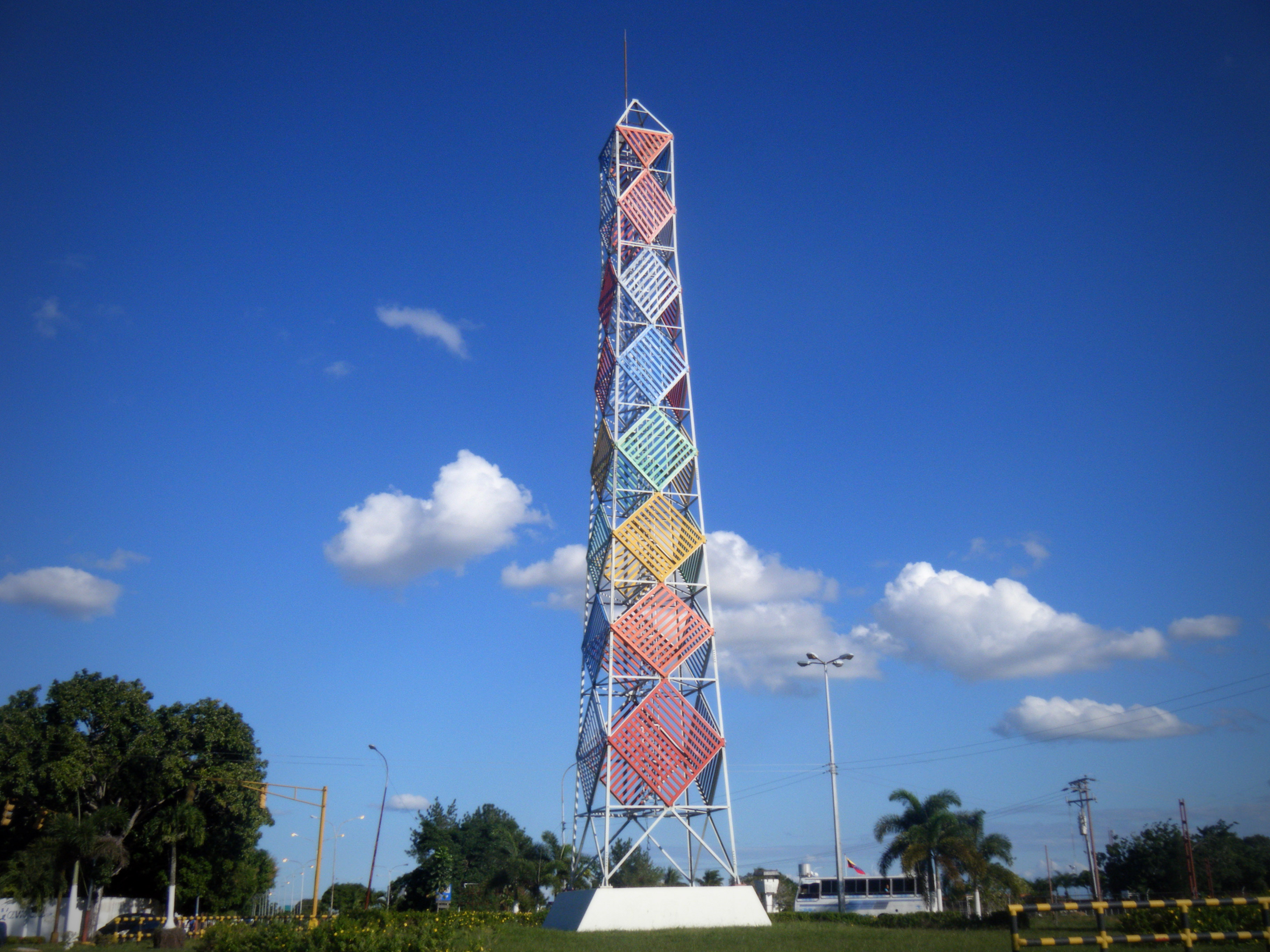
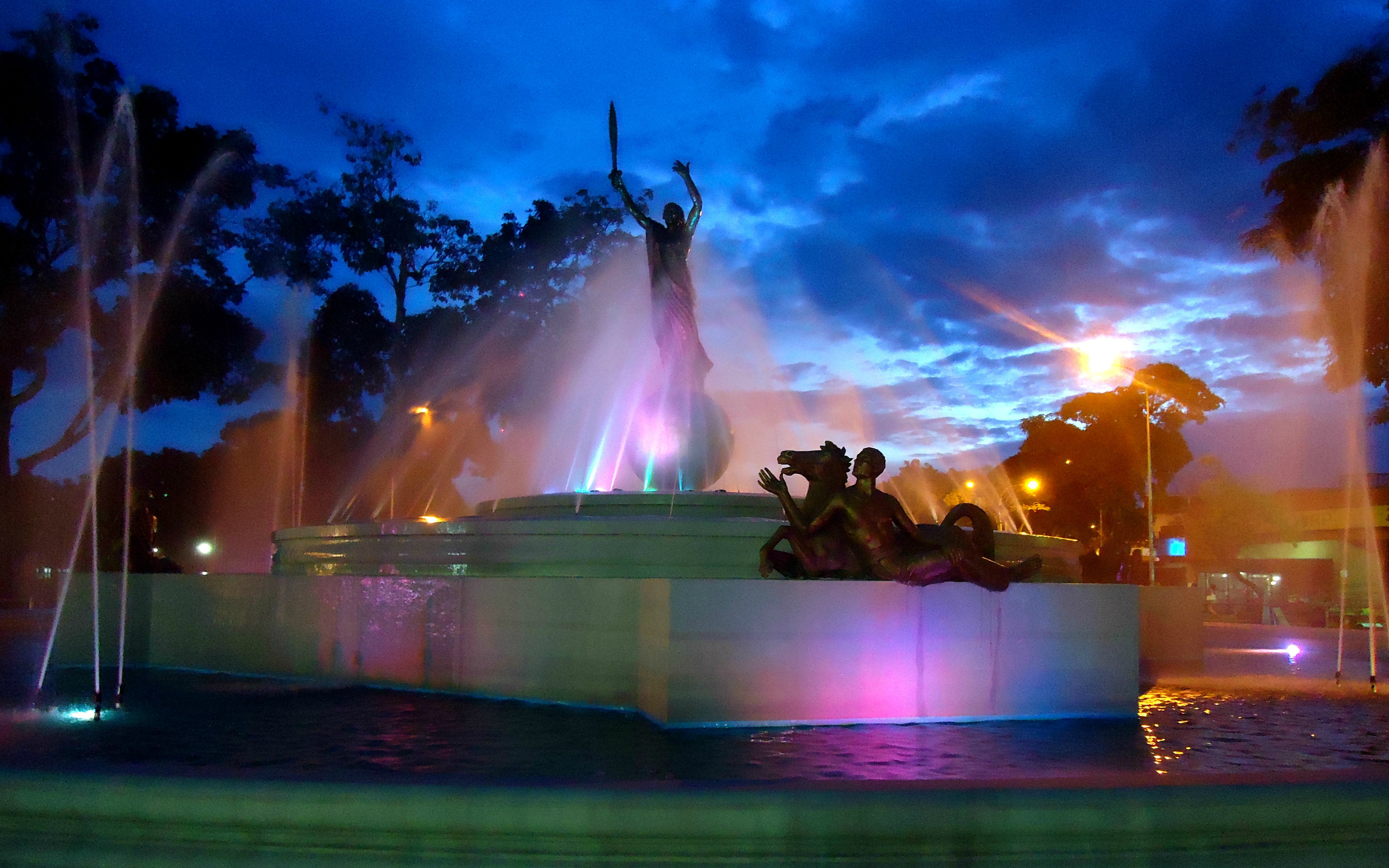
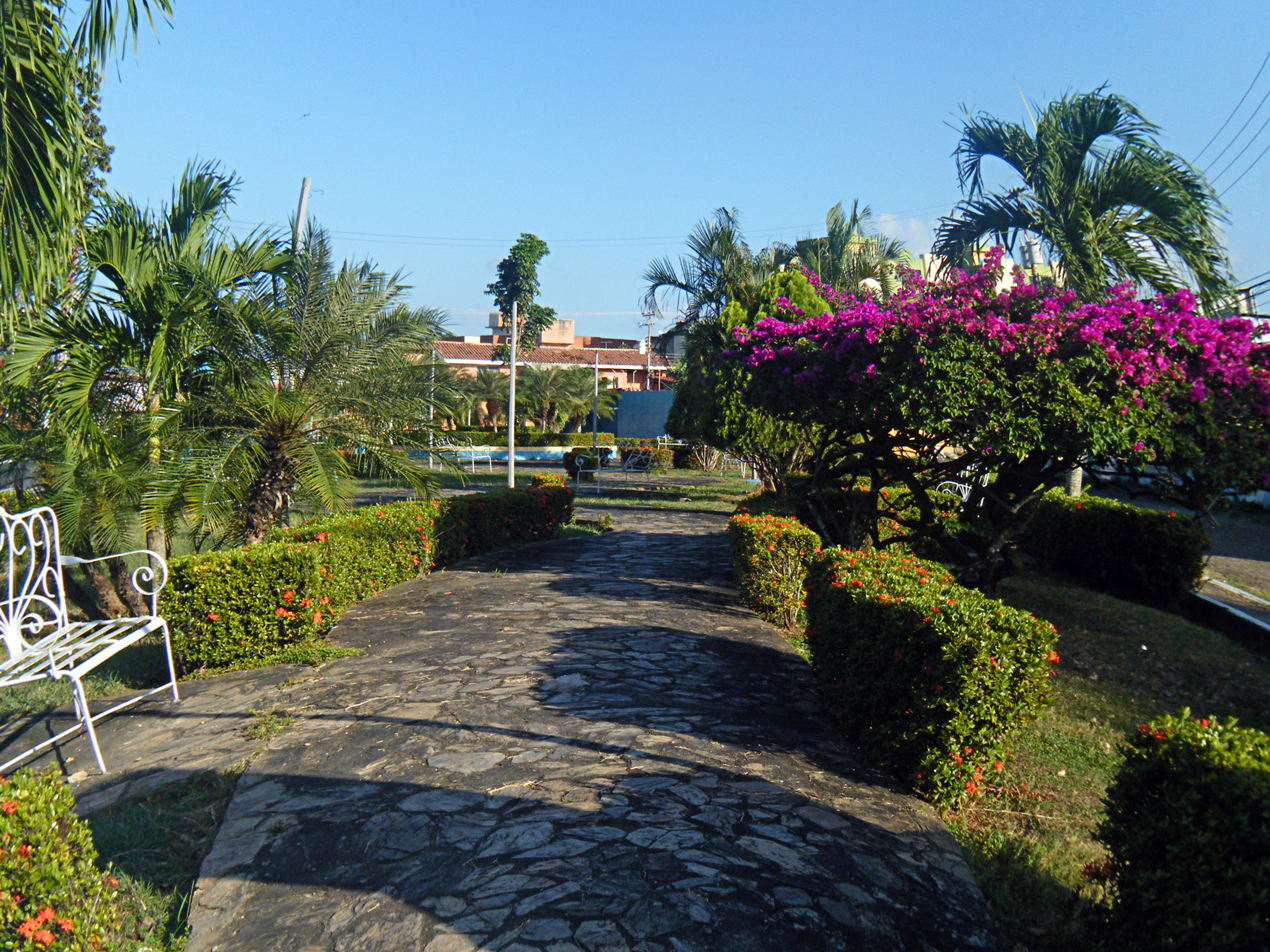
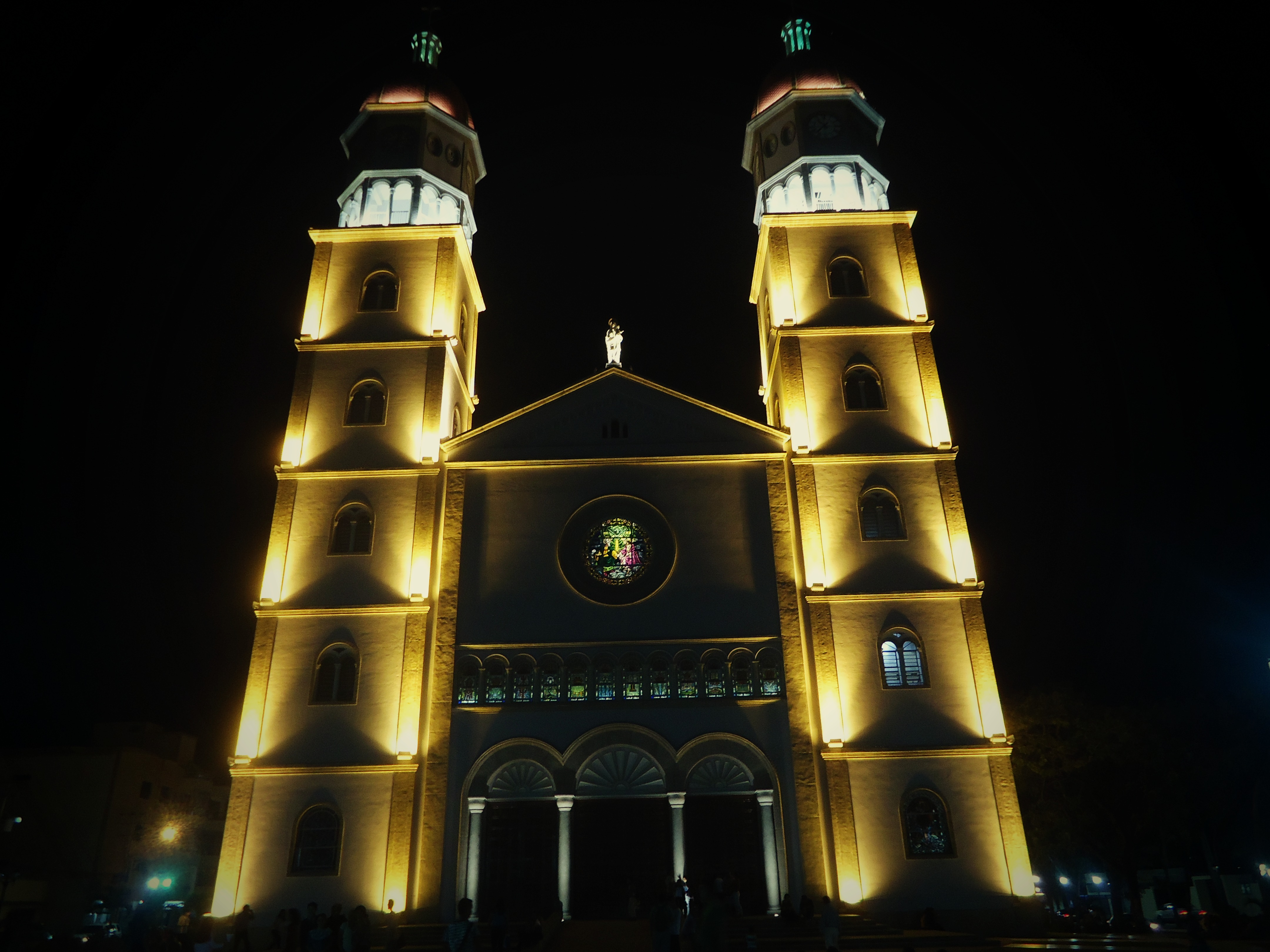
- Top: San Miguel Arcangel Church; Second:Maturín San Simon Church, Especial Lumino-Cromatica Tower; Third: Fountain in Redoma Juana La Avanzadora; Bottom: La Guaricha Zoological Park, Maturín Cathedral

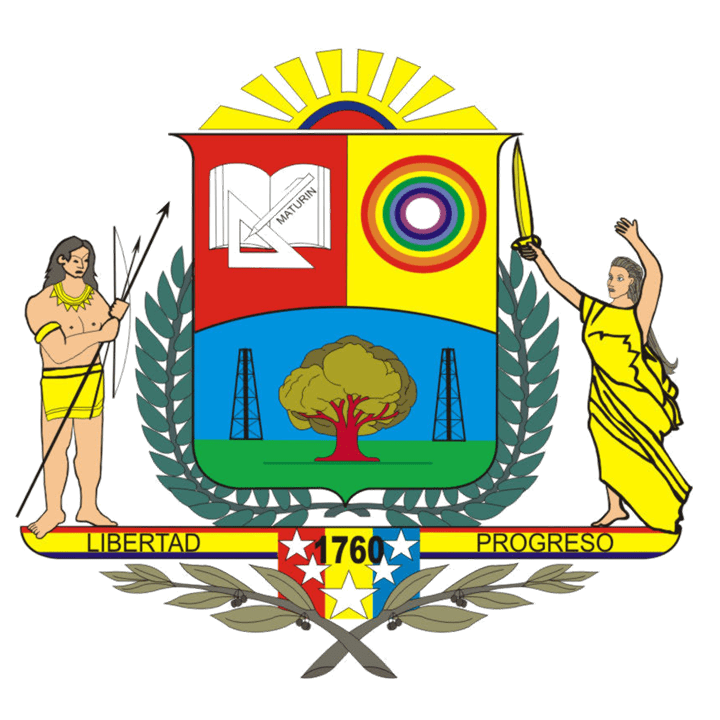
- Flag Coat of arms
- Nickname: The Sultana of Guarapiche
- Motto: "La Ciudad Distinta" ("The Different City")
- Location within Venezuela
- Coordinates: 9.750°N 63.183°W
- Country: Venezuela
- State: Monagas
- Municipality: Maturín
- Established: December 7, 1760 .
- Founder: Lucas de Zaragoza

Government
  - Mayor: Ana Fuentes (PSUV)
  - Demonym: Maturinés

Area
  - Total: 13,352 km^{2} (5,155 sq mi)
- Elevation: 67 m (220 ft)

Population (2021)
  - Total: 647,459
  - Density: 1,165.15/km^{2} (3,017.7/sq mi)
- Time zone: UTC−4 (VET)
- Area code: 0291
- Climate: Aw
- Website: alcaldiadematurin.gob.ve

Maturín (Spanish pronunciation: [matuˈɾin]) is a city in Venezuela, the capital of the Venezuelan state of Monagas and a centre for instrumental exploration and development of the petroleum industry in Venezuela. The metropolitan area of Maturín has a population of 401,384 inhabitants. Maturín is also a busy regional transportation hub, connecting routes from the northeastern coast to the Orinoco Delta and the Gran Sabana.

== History ==
=== Founding ===
December 7, 1760, is the official date of the founding of Maturín (according to the Venezuelan Academy of History) by the Franciscan missionary Lucas de Zaragoza. However, the Jesuit priest Pablo Ojer found a document in the General Archive of the Indies which proves an earlier founding date for the city in 1722. This primitive town was called San Juan de la Tornera de Maturín and its founder was the Spanish governor Juan de la Tornera y Sota. San Juan de la Tornera de Maturín was a city for Spaniards, but it did not survive very long because of the lack of population and few economic resources. Initially, San Judas Tadeo de Maturín (Lucas de Zaragoza gave this name to Maturín) was a Spanish mission created for the conversion of the nearby native Chaima and Warao people. The Spaniards decided to move to Maturín and in the 19th century it received the category of city and the name of San Fernando de Maturín.

=== Origin of the name Maturín ===
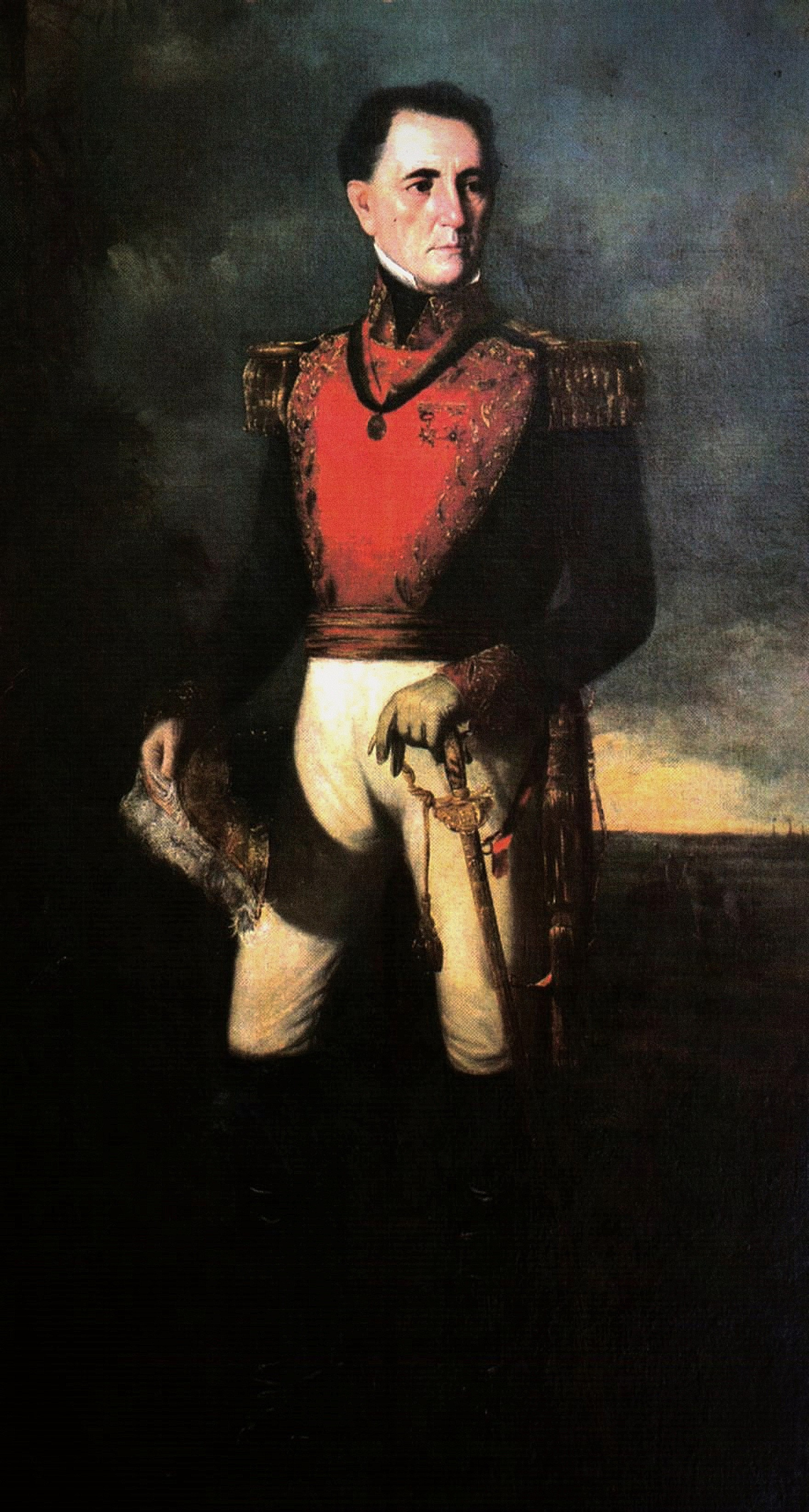
Portrait of José Tadeo Monagas.

Maturín was named after an indigenous chief (cacique) who lived with his tribe next to the bank of Guarapiche River. He was murdered by a supposed Spanish captain named Arrioja during a battle between tribal members and Spaniards on the site of the town in 1718. Since then the area has been known as el Sitio de Maturín ('the place of Maturín').

Some historians have concluded that the name Maturín is instead of French origin. They base their theory on the legend of a supposed French missionary who explored the area at the end of the 17th century. The legend says that the missionary (whose surname might have been Mathurin) baptized a young indigenous boy and gave him the name Mathurin, the boy later becoming el indio Maturín. There is also the possibility that the boy may have been named after a 4th-century French saint, Saint Mathurin. However, the legend of this supposed French missionary has not been proved yet. Other historians disagree with the theory, arguing that there is a plant with the same name and indigenous place names very similar to the name Maturín.

=== Independence war ===
Maturín (as a part of the Province of Cumaná) was on the republican side during the Venezuelan Declaration of Independence on July 5, 1811. Five battles took place in Maturín from 1813 to 1814, including the famous Battle of Alto de los Godos. In this battle the Venezuelan patriots, led by Manuel Piar, obtained a great victory against the Spanish general Juan Domingo de Monteverde. Antonio José de Sucre, José Francisco Bermúdez, José Tadeo Monagas, José Gregorio Monagas and José Félix Ribas were others who fought in the five battles.

The last battle of Maturín (December 1814), however, was a defeat. During the 1814 Caracas Exodus, many soldiers and civilians who had escaped from Caracas during the military campaign of José Tomás Boves against the Republic, came to Maturín to shelter from the Spanish troops. After the battle of Urica (where Boves died) Tomás José Morales, a Spanish general, decided to take the town. The Republicans defended the town, but they were beaten and many of them were murdered by Morales. The town was destroyed. Some survivors of the last battle rebuilt Maturín two years later.

=== 19th and 20th centuries ===
Maturín grew slowly during the 19th century due to civil wars (which destroyed the region's flourishing farming and livestock-raising industries and killed many people) and fatal diseases, such as malaria and yellow fever, transmitted by mosquitoes. In 1909 Maturín became capital of the new Monagas state. Before that the town was the capital of the Province Maturín from 1856 to 1859. In the 20th century Maturín grew rapidly due to the discovery of petroleum fields near the town and a health campaign carried out by doctors to eliminate mosquitoes. Maturín has been the headquarters of the Roman Catholic Diocese of Maturín since 1958.

== Geography ==
Maturin is located at 67 meters of altitude and 520 kilometres from the country's capital, Caracas. It is right next to the Guarapiche River and is a crossroad for roads towards the center, the Caribbean coast and the Orinoco River

=== Climate ===
Maturín features a tropical savannah climate (Köppen climate classification: Aw).

Climate data for Maturín (1991–2020, extremes 1961–2020)
Month	Jan	Feb	Mar	Apr	May	Jun	Jul	Aug	Sep	Oct	Nov	Dec	Year
Record high °C (°F)	35.5 (95.9)	35.7 (96.3)	37.0 (98.6)	37.6 (99.7)	39.7 (103.5)	35.9 (96.6)	36.8 (98.2)	38.4 (101.1)	37.0 (98.6)	38.2 (100.8)	35.5 (95.9)	35.1 (95.2)	39.7 (103.5)
Mean daily maximum °C (°F)	30.9 (87.6)	31.6 (88.9)	32.8 (91.0)	33.9 (93.0)	33.1 (91.6)	31.5 (88.7)	31.1 (88.0)	31.6 (88.9)	32.3 (90.1)	32.3 (90.1)	31.6 (88.9)	30.9 (87.6)	32.0 (89.6)
Daily mean °C (°F)	25.3 (77.5)	25.7 (78.3)	26.6 (79.9)	27.6 (81.7)	27.6 (81.7)	26.6 (79.9)	26.4 (79.5)	26.7 (80.1)	27.2 (81.0)	27.1 (80.8)	26.5 (79.7)	25.7 (78.3)	26.6 (79.9)
Mean daily minimum °C (°F)	22.3 (72.1)	22.5 (72.5)	23.1 (73.6)	24.0 (75.2)	24.6 (76.3)	24.3 (75.7)	24.2 (75.6)	24.2 (75.6)	24.5 (76.1)	24.4 (75.9)	24.4 (75.9)	23.1 (73.6)	23.8 (74.8)
Record low °C (°F)	16.7 (62.1)	17.4 (63.3)	18.5 (65.3)	18.1 (64.6)	18.3 (64.9)	16.1 (61.0)	17.2 (63.0)	18.3 (64.9)	20.7 (69.3)	20.4 (68.7)	18.3 (64.9)	17.7 (63.9)	16.1 (61.0)
Average rainfall mm (inches)	63.1 (2.48)	37.3 (1.47)	37.1 (1.46)	47.3 (1.86)	95.9 (3.78)	217.2 (8.55)	220.7 (8.69)	197.1 (7.76)	129.9 (5.11)	140.1 (5.52)	131.7 (5.19)	116.1 (4.57)	1,433.5 (56.44)
Average rainy days (≥ 1.0 mm)	9.6	6.2	4.7	4.8	9.7	18.1	19.5	16.8	12.4	12.3	13.4	13.2	140.7
Average relative humidity (%)	74.5	71.5	70.5	70.0	72.0	76.5	76.5	75.5	74.0	74.0	76.5	76.0	74.0
Mean monthly sunshine hours	248.0	224.0	251.1	228.0	213.9	168.0	186.0	204.6	213.0	232.5	219.0	229.4	2,617.5
Mean daily sunshine hours	8.0	8.0	8.1	7.6	6.9	5.6	6.0	6.6	7.1	7.5	7.3	7.4	7.2
Source 1: NOAA (sun 1961–1990)
Source 2: Instituto Nacional de Meteorología e Hidrología (humidity 1970–1998)

== Law and government ==
Maturín has one municipality: Maturín Municipality; Venezuelan law specifies that municipal governments have four main functions: executive, legislative, comptroller, and planning. The executive function is managed by the mayor, who is in charge of representing the municipality's administration. The legislative branch is represented by the municipal council, composed of seven councillors, charged with the deliberation of new decrees and local laws. The comptroller tasks are managed by the municipal comptroller's office, which oversees accountancy. Finally, planning is represented by the local public planning council, which manages development projects for the municipality.

=== Mayors since 1990 ===
- María Elena de Cañizales (1990–1992), Democratic Action
- José Enrique López Tablero (1993–1995), COPEI, Movement for Socialism
- Domingo Urbina Simoza (1996–2000), (2000–2004), Democratic Action
- Numa Rojas (2004–2008), Fifth Republic Movement
- José Maicavares (2008–2013), United Socialist Party of Venezuela
- Warner Jimenez (2013–2015), Popular Will
- Wilfredo Ordaz (2016–2017), (2017–2021), United Socialist Party of Venezuela
- Ana Fuentes (2021–Present), United Socialist Party of Venezuela

== Economy ==
Maturín is one of the most important cities in the east of the country as its strategic position serves as a bridge to the other states of the region. The city has grown during the last few years mainly because of the increase in the state's oil industry. However, Maturín has been hit hard by Venezuela's recent economic crisis.

== Transportation ==
It is possible to travel there by land or by using José Tadeo Monagas International Airport.

== Higher education ==
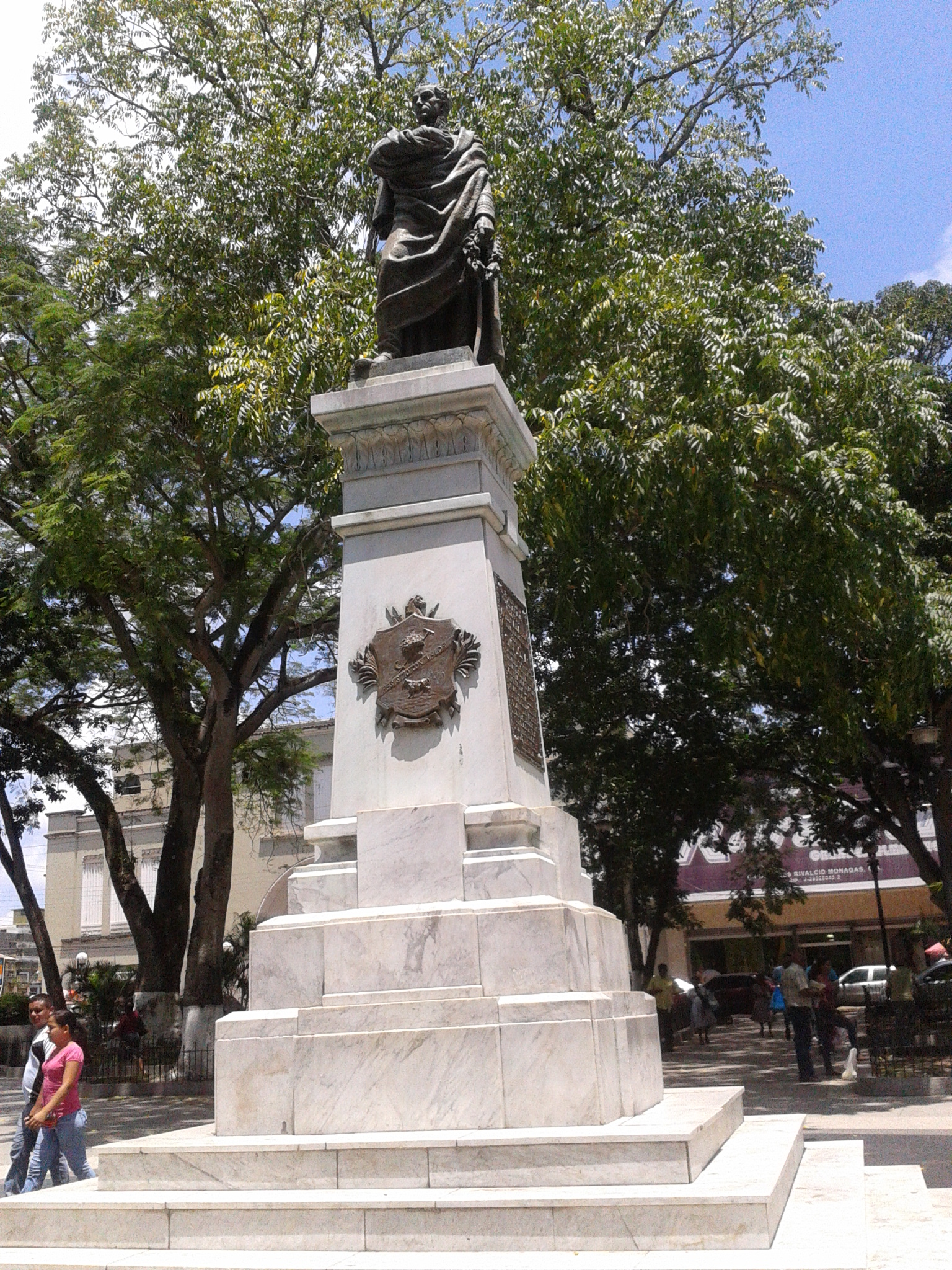
Plaza Bolívar in Maturín.

Public universities

- Universidad de Oriente (UDO-Monagas)
- Universidad Pedagógica Experimental Libertador – Instituto Pedagógico de Maturín (UPEL/IPM)
- Universidad Nacional Abierta (UNA)
- Bolivarian University of Venezuela (UBV)
- Universidad Nacional Experimental Simón Rodríguez (UNESR)

Private universities

- Universidad Gran Mariscal de Ayacucho (UGMA)
- Universidad Católica Cecilio Acosta (UNICA)
- Universidad de Margarita (UNIMAR)

Private Institutes of Higher Education

- Santiago Mariño Polytechnic University Institute (PSM)
- Instituto Universitario de Tecnología Industrial Rodolfo Loero Arismendi (IUTIRLA)
- Instituto Universitario de Tecnología Venezuela (IUTV)

== Places of interest ==
=== Roman Catholic churches ===
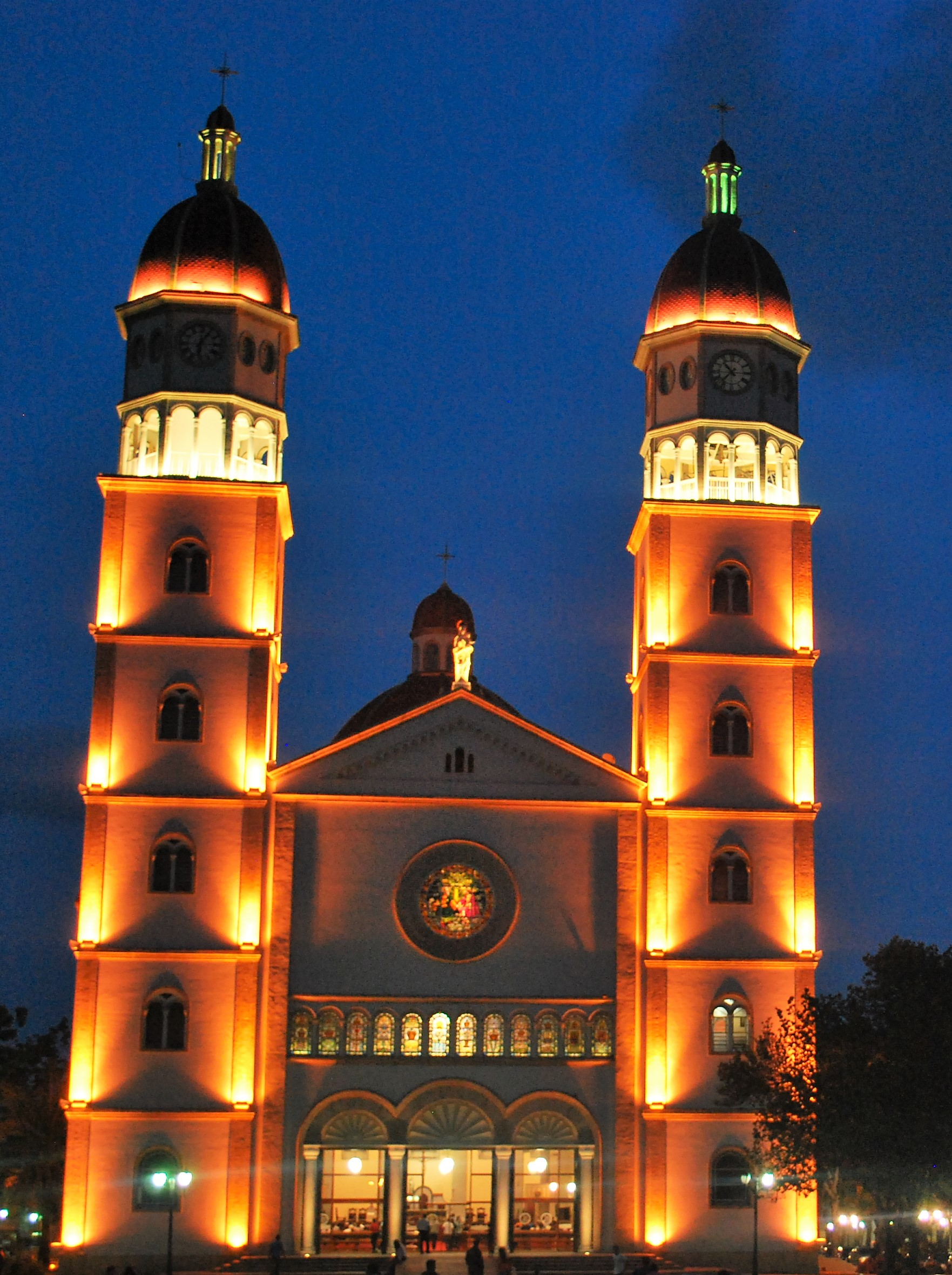
The Cathedral Nuestra Señora del Carmen.

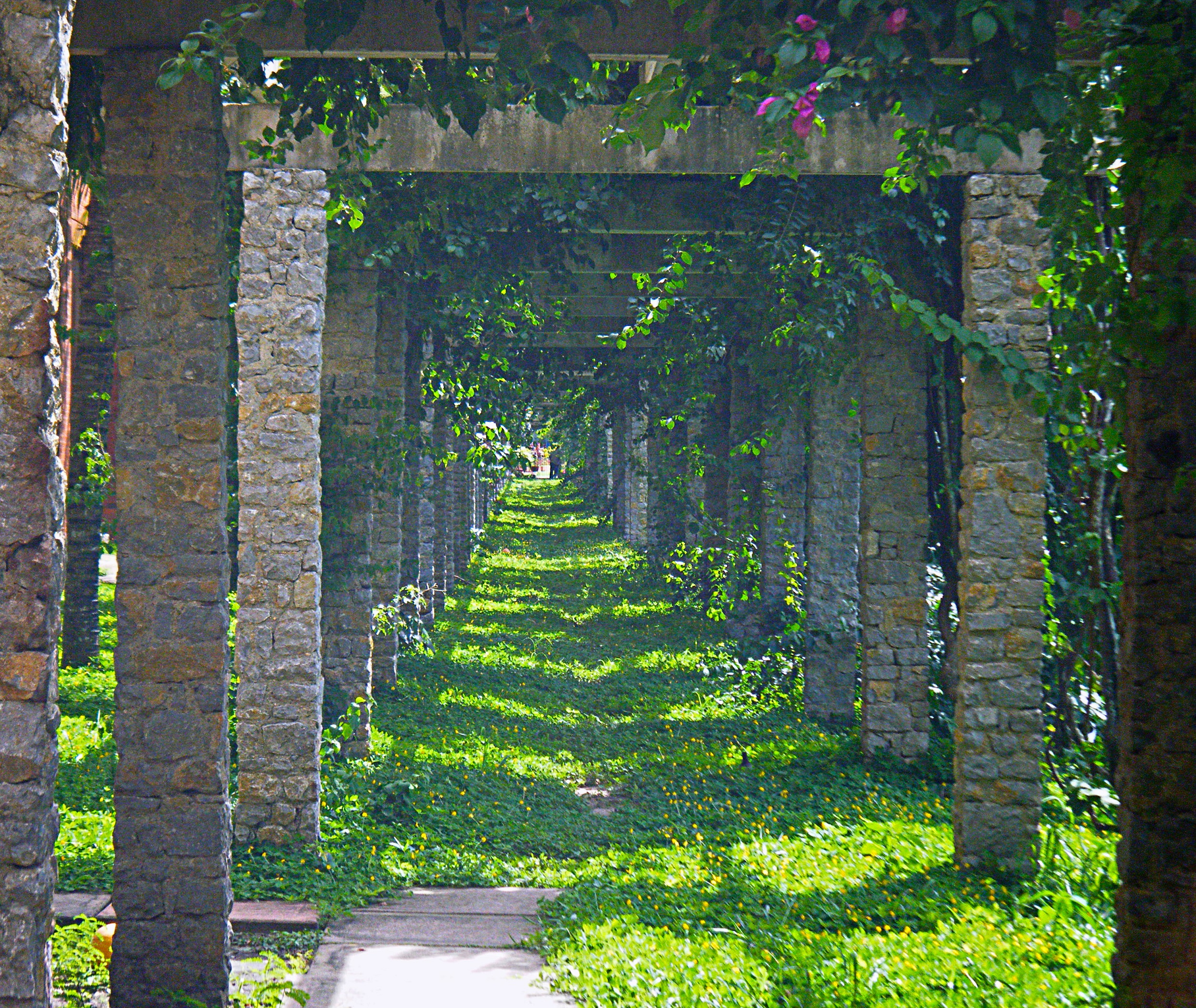
Road of flowers in La Cascada de Maturín Mall.

- San Simón Church: the oldest church in Maturín. It was built between 1884 and 1887 and is located in front of the Plaza Bolivar.
- Cathedral of Our Lady of Mount Carmel: a Catholic church in Romanesque style. Its construction began in 1961 and was finished in 1981. It is located on Bolívar Avenue. It is considered one of the most modern cathedrals in Latin America.

=== Parks ===
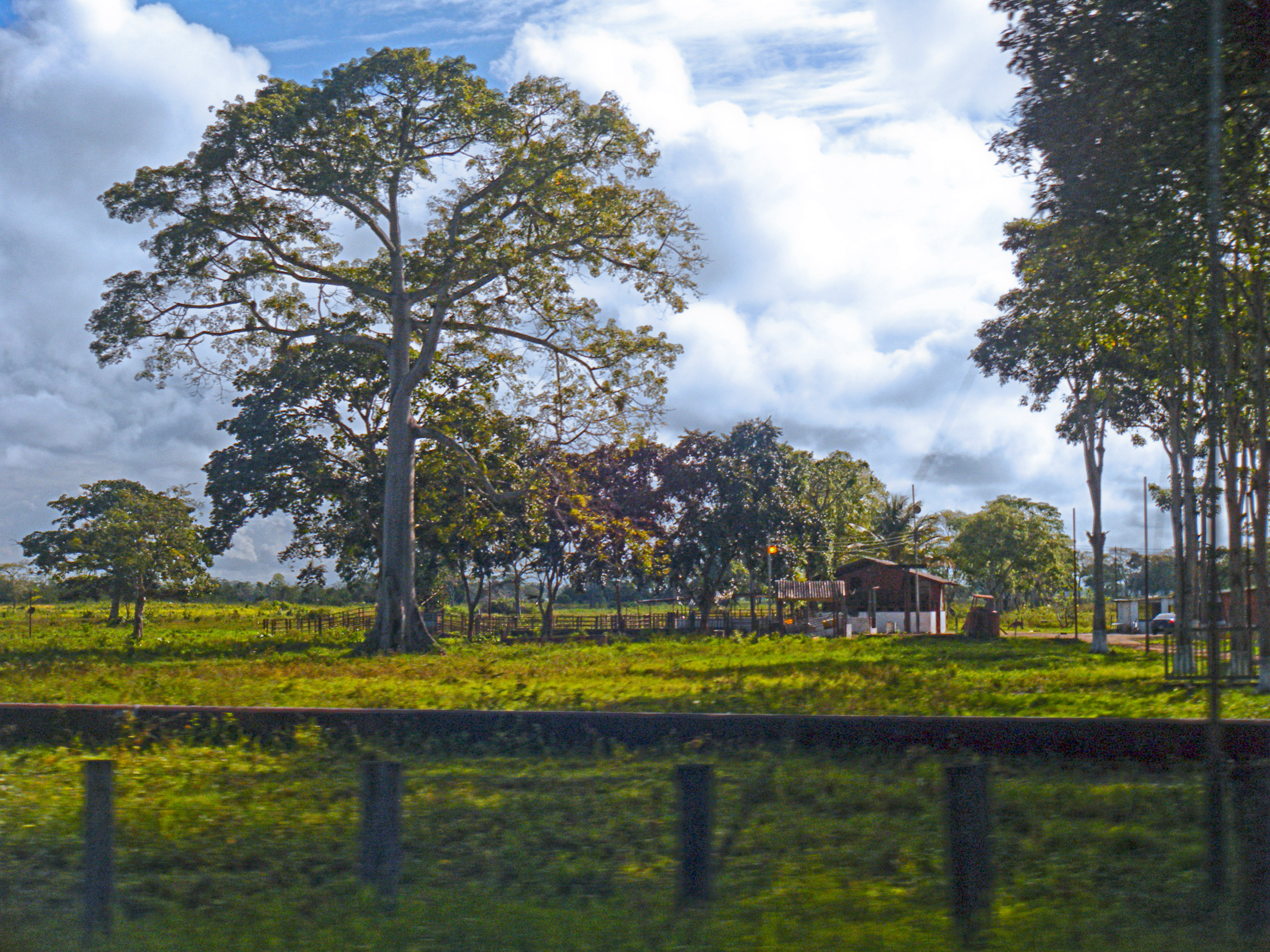
Landscape in Maturín

- Parque de La Guaricha: a zoological park located on Raúl Leoni Avenue.
- Parque Menca de Leoni: a former zoological park. It lost its status when the Parque de La Guaricha was built. Located on Juncal Avenue.
- Parque Andrés Eloy Blanco: located on Raúl Leoni Avenue.
- Parque Padilla Ron: located in Las Cocuizas sector.
- Parque Rómulo Betancourt: located on Universidad Avenue, next to the Universidad de Oriente.
- Parque de los Guaritos: located in Los Guaritos sector.

=== Museums, theatres and art galleries ===
- Complejo Cultural de Maturín (Cultural Complex of Maturín): a group of buildings where some cultural institutions are located such as the Art School "Eloy Palacios", the Virtual Library and the Museo Mateo Manaure (Museum Mateo Manaure). The Francisco de Miranda Square and a pedestrian art gallery belong to the complex.
- Casa de la Cultura (Culture House): a small theatre located on Bolívar Avenue.
- Galería de Arte del CONAC (Art Gallery of the CONAC): it belongs to the network of art galleries of the CONAC. Located inside the Centro Comercial Guarapiche.

=== Others ===
- Amana del Tamarindo: a small town located thirty minutes from Maturín. It received its name from a tamarind tree located in the town, like the Amana River. Under this tree, which still exists, was the birthplace of José Tadeo Monagas.
- Plaza Bolívar: the main town square of Maturín and also the oldest of the city. In front of it is the Palacio de Gobierno (built in 1942), where the governor of the state of Monagas carries out his duties.

== Gallery images ==
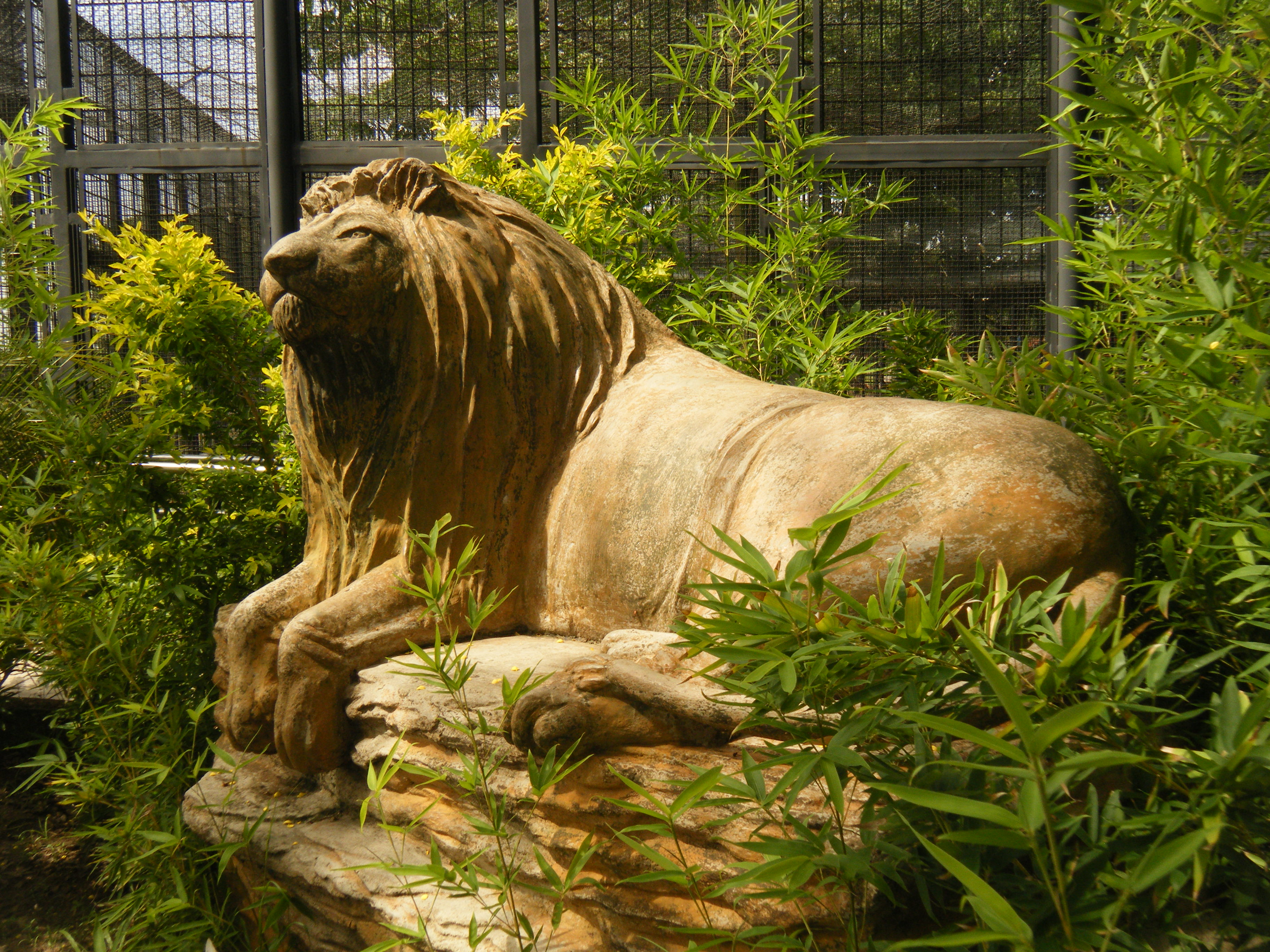
La Guaricha Park

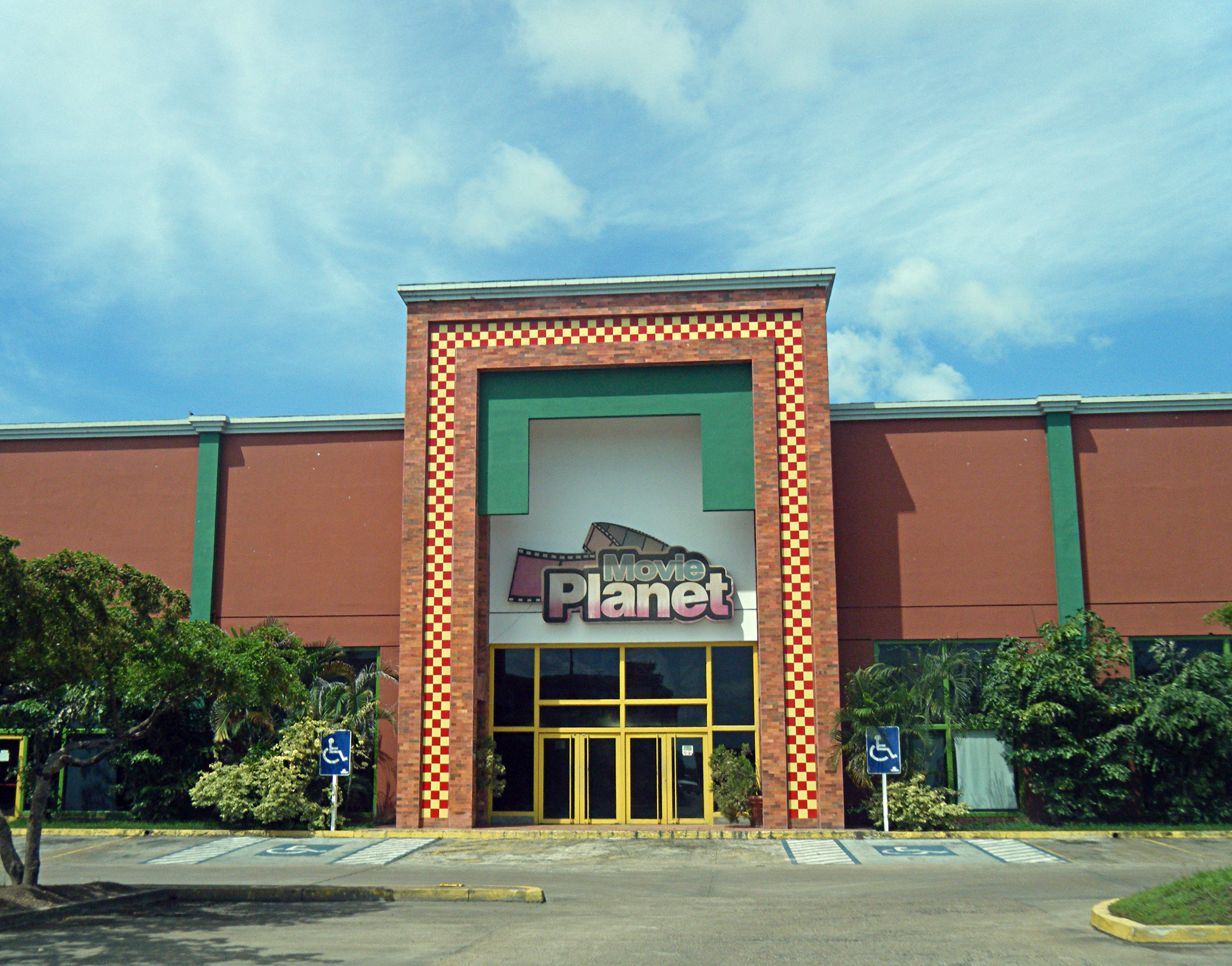
Movie Planet Cinema

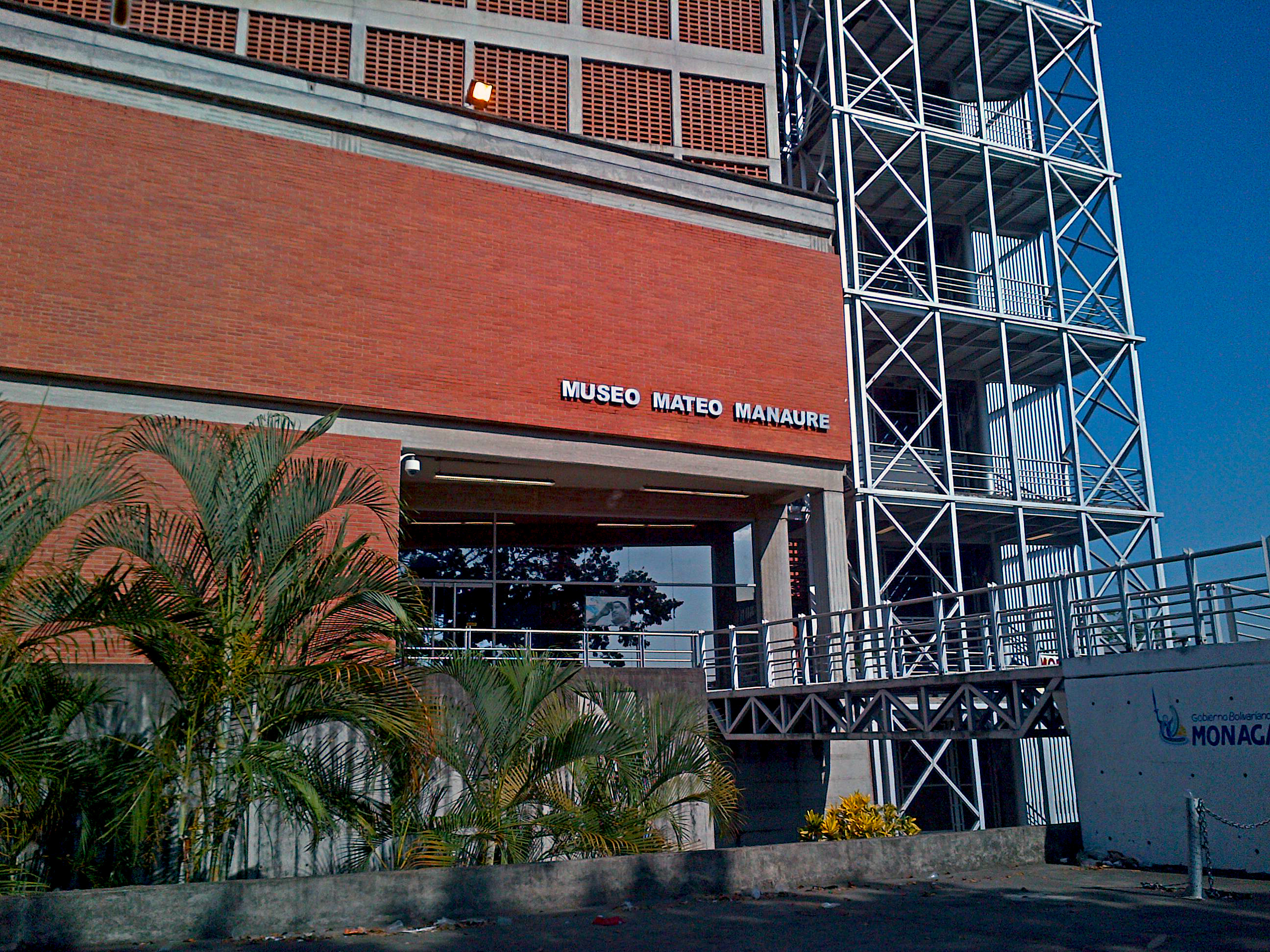
Mateo Manaure Museum

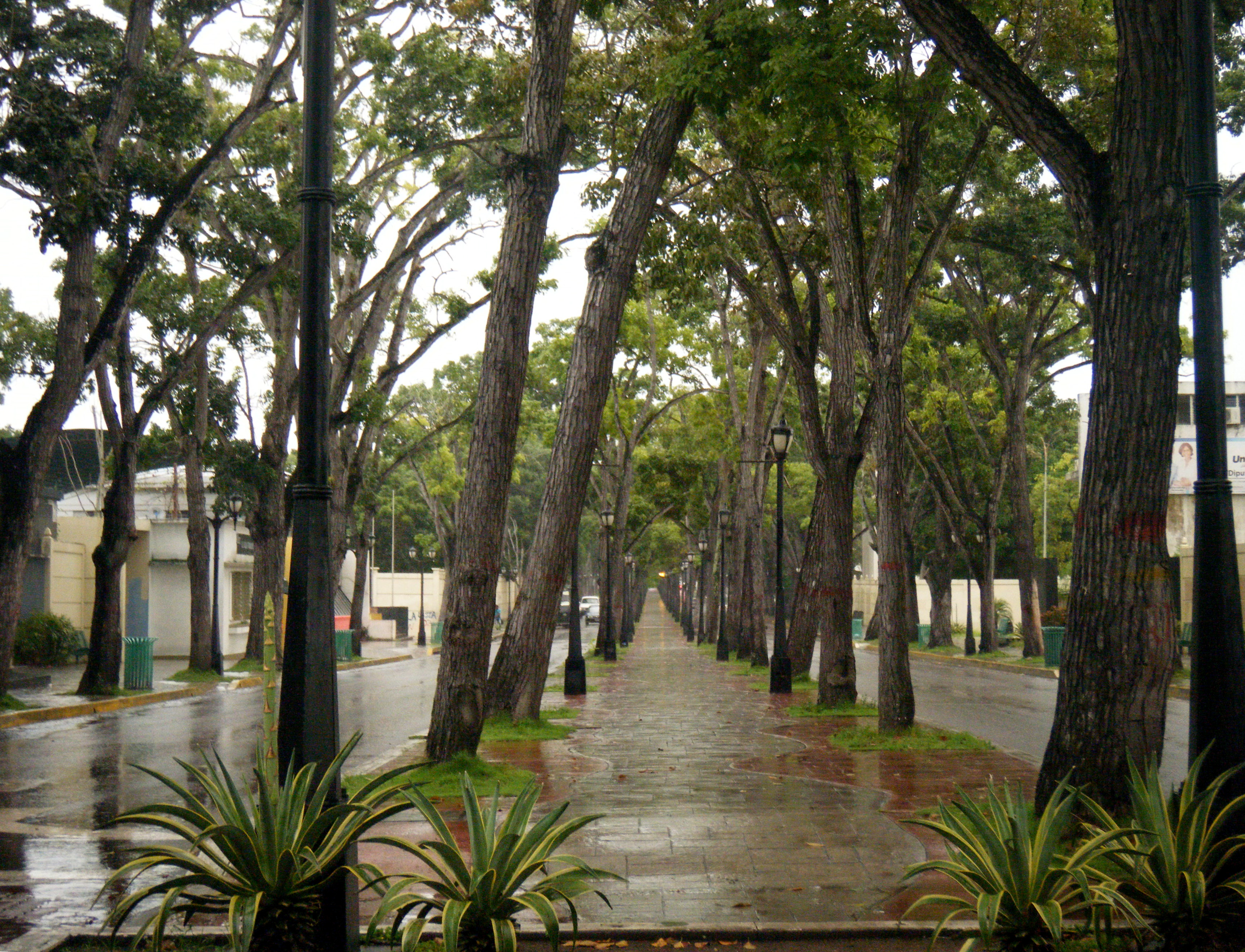
Bolívar Avenue in Maturín

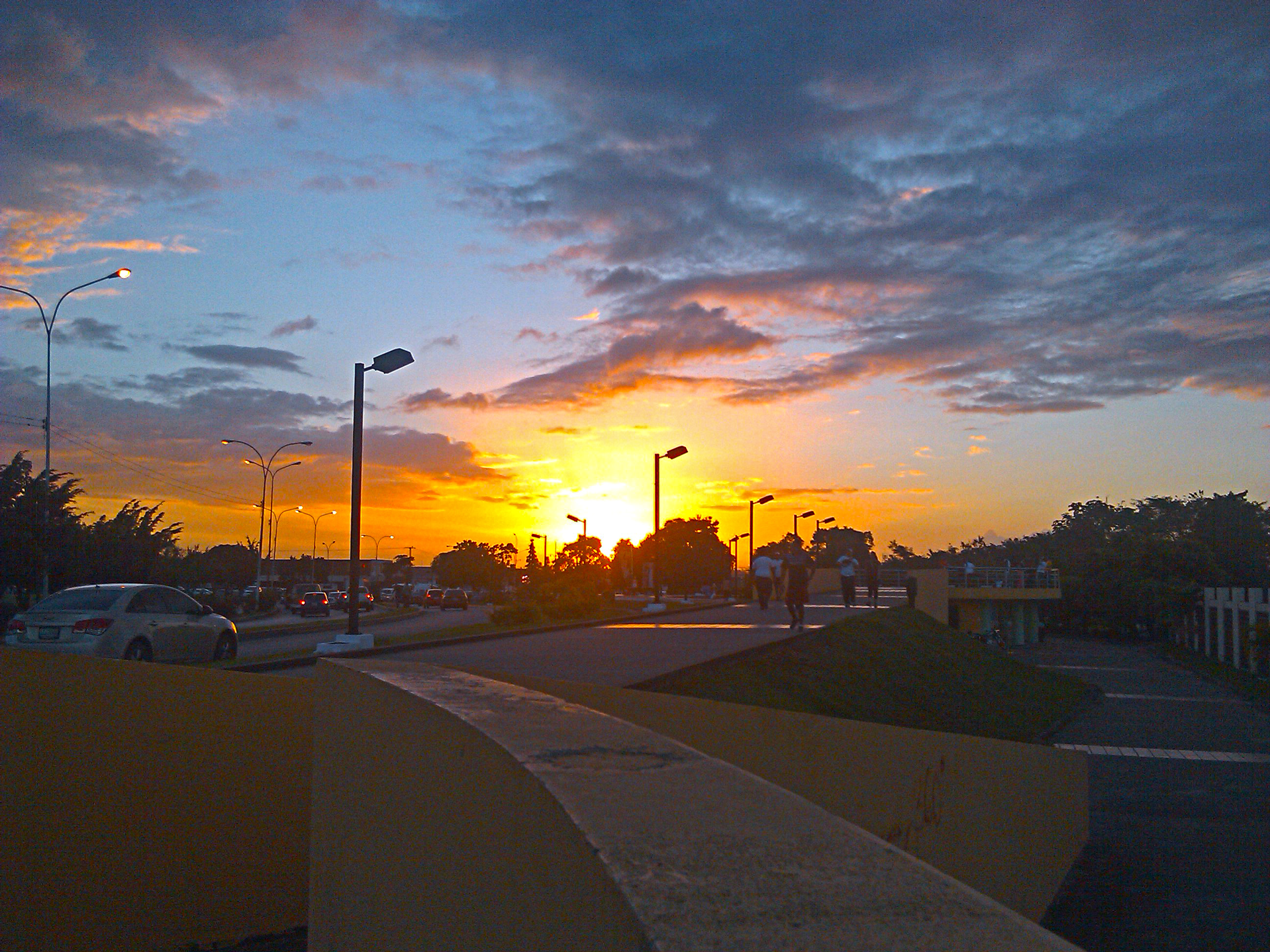
Sunset in Maturín

== Sports ==
=== Sports facilities ===
- Estadio Monumental de Maturín
- Complejo Polideportivo de Maturín (Sports Complex of Maturín).

=== Teams ===
- Monagas Sport Club: local soccer team
- Cangrejeros de Monagas: basketball team

=== Other Sports Disciplines ===
Paddle tennis is played at the Once Padel courts in Tipuro, Maturín. On June 28, 2024, the new club's facilities were inaugurated, located within the Kariña Hotel and Club Palma Real, prior to the Maturín Paddle Masters. Additionally, there is a children's baseball team called Criollitos Monagas.

Local soccer leagues are organized by the Monagas State Football Association (AFEM). There are teams like Atlético Maturín and Academia Monagas SC, belonging to lower categories such as the Under-12 and Under-14 categories. Furthermore, there are sports schools like the Professor Antonio Mejía School dedicated to promoting the practice of this sport.

== See also ==
- List of cities and towns in Venezuela
