= Geoff Tamblyn =

Australian cricketer (born 1949)

Personal information
- Born: 8 April 1949 (age 77); Melbourne, Australia

Domestic team information
- Years: Team
- 1974: Victoria
- Source: Cricinfo, 5 December 2015

Geoff Tamblyn (born 8 April 1949) is an Australian former cricketer. He played one first-class cricket match for Victoria in 1974 against the touring English side. Tamblyn went on to become Chairman of Cricket Victoria and director of Cricket Australia.

- Cricket Australia Director: 1997 – 2013 (16 years)
- Cricket Victoria Chairman: 2000 – 2015 (15 years)

== See also ==
- List of Victoria first-class cricketers
