= Doni Tamblyn =

American singer

- Born: October 1, 1952 (age 73); United States
- Occupations: Author, Speaker, Corporate Trainer, Actor, Comedian
- Website: humorrules.com

Doni Tamblyn (born 1952) is an internationally published author, comedian, and President of the corporate training company, HumorRULES, founded in the early 1990s.

Both Tamblyn's books and her company espouse teaching and training through humor, in particular theatre improv-derived games. Her first book, The Big Book of Humorous Training Games contains 50 games for training business people in communication skills. The second book, Laugh and Learn: 95 Ways to Use Humor for More Effective Teaching and Training seeks to show connections between recent brain research and ongoing humor research, argue that humor enhances brain function, and show techniques for using humor and play in teaching and/or communication.

== Biography ==
A singer-comedian since 1979, in 1988 Tamblyn began doing commercial voiceover and theatre improvisation. In 1989, seeking solely to increase her income, she took a job teaching at a state-sanctioned traffic school that used comedians as instructors. This experience, in which initially resistant learners consistently became highly involved and enthusiastic, ultimately led her to value the role of laughter in learning. She became Instructor Coordinator for her traffic school; began studying instructional design, accelerative learning, and brain-compatible learning; and, inspired by the many innovations of her comedian/instructor staff, redesigned and standardized the format of the traffic school's classes. It was during this time that she also developed some of her first business communication skills programs. She founded HumorRULES in 1993.

In succeeding years, she delivered training throughout the U.S., and in Canada, Europe, and S.E. Asia, to organizations including Chevron USA, Inc.; AstraZeneca; the Federal Reserve Bank; State Farm; Pacific Gas & Electric; Wyeth Europe; Wells Fargo Bank; and the USDA. Tamblyn has been an invited presenter at international conferences of The American Society for Training and Development (ASTD) and The International Society for Humor Studies. Her training techniques have been taught through the University of California Extension Business and Management program and the College of Health and Human Services at Western Michigan University. From September 2004 through July 2005, she used her techniques in delivering business and EFL training in Shanghai, China. In 2006, she was an invited lecturer at the 6th International Summer School on Humor and Laughter at the University of Fribourg, Switzerland.

In 2001, Tamblyn relocated HumorRULES to Philadelphia Pennsylvania. Currently she resides in New Jersey.

=== Early life ===
Doni Tamblyn was born in San Mateo California in 1952. In 1962, her family moved to British Columbia, Canada. From 1976 to 1978 she studied art at Vancouver Community College Langara, after which she spent a few years doing graphic illustration and portraiture. During this time, she also trained in voice and acting, and began doing comedy shows in local clubs. In 1983, she moved back to California to study broadcasting at San Francisco State University. After graduating, she did voiceover acting, theatre improv, and a cappella singing and arranging, before moving permanently to teaching and training.
