= Nicosia Cathedral =

Roman Catholic cathedral in Nicosia, Sicily, Italy

Coordinates: 37.74787°N 14.39817°E

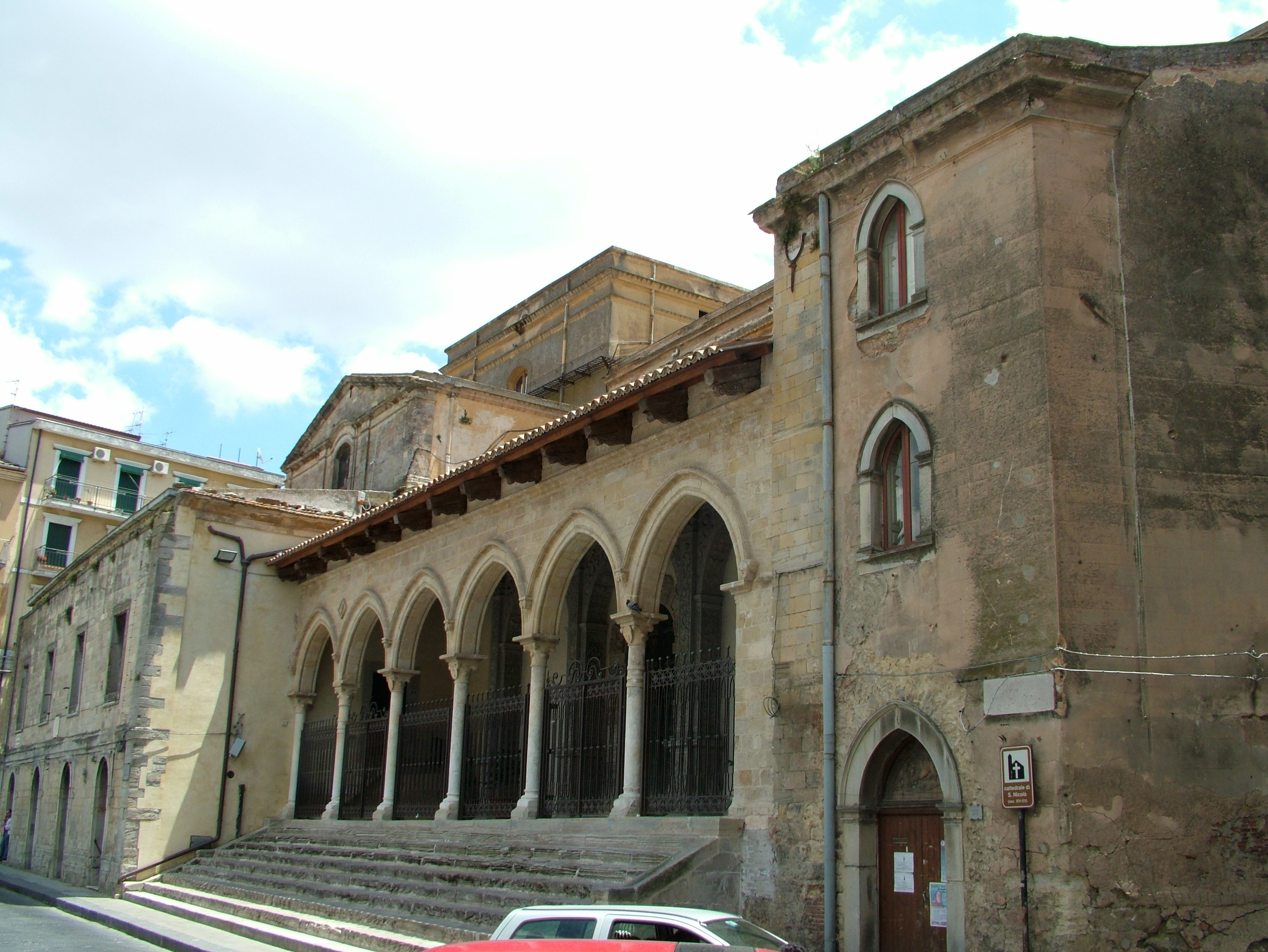
West front of the cathedral

Nicosia Cathedral (Italian: Cattedrale di San Nicolò; Cattedrale or Duomo di Nicosia) is the cathedral of the Roman Catholic Diocese of Nicosia, Sicily, and is located in Nicosia, Sicily, Italy. It is dedicated to Saint Nicholas of Bari. The Cathedral preserves a precious and unique wooden roof of 1300.

The church was built in the early 1300s, under the reign of Frederick II of Aragon, and became functional, even if not completed, in 1340.

== History ==
A church at the site, called San Nicolò il Piccolo, is recalled to have been present during the Byzantine and Saracen occupations of Sicily. A larger church, dedicated also to Saint Nicholas of Bari, was begun by 1302 during the rule of Federico II d'Aragona. It was not completed until 1340. according to an epigraph on the architrave of the Porta del Monte, at the left of the main portal. In 1521, the church was elevated to a collegiate church by Pope Leo X. During the 17th and 18th centuries, it competed with the local church of Santa Maria Maggiore for primacy. In 1817, this church was made cathedral of the town with its own bishop. In 1940, the Cathedral was named a national monument. It was made a minor basilica in 1967.

== Description ==
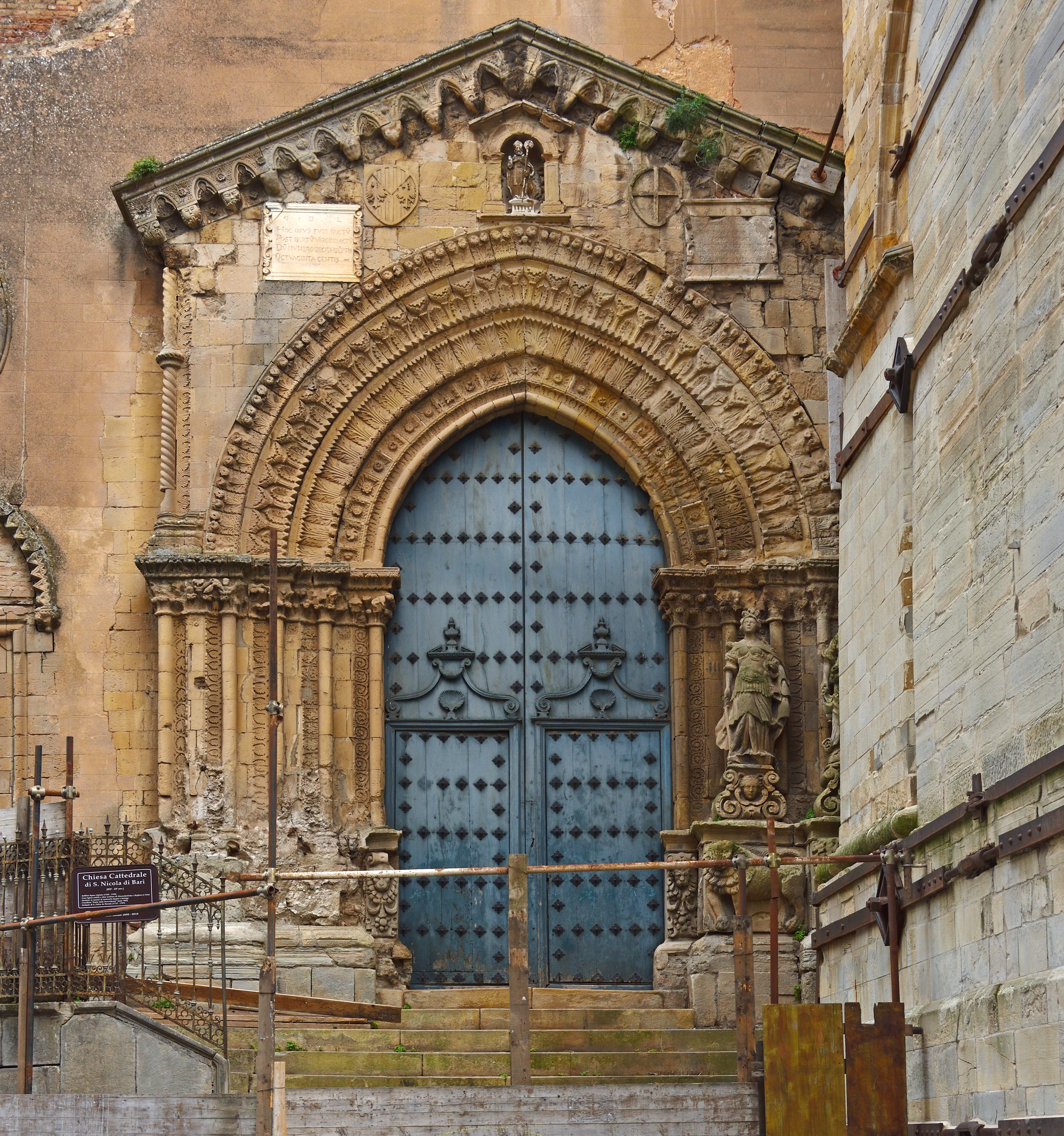
Main portal

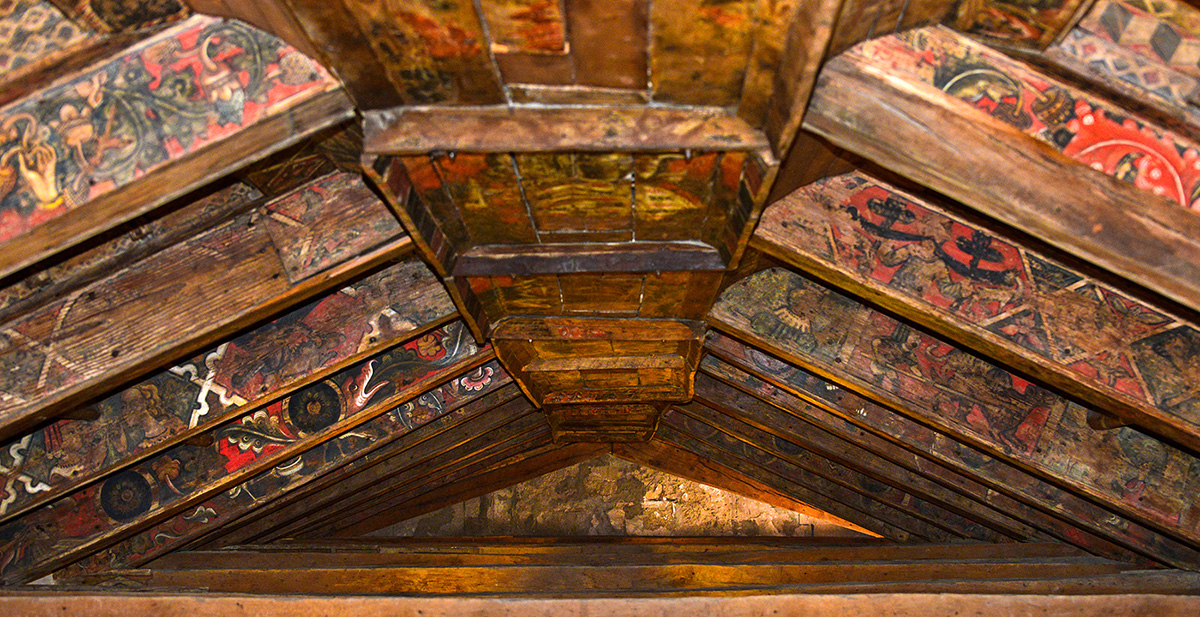
Wooden ceiling of nave.

The church has two main access points. There is a portico with shallow ogival arches facing a Piazza Garibaldi with a fountain. The main portal on the facade has a Gothic and Romanesque portal, rich with a leafy sculptural decoration. At the base are statues depicting the four cardinal virtues (prudence, strength, justice, and temperance) and above the tympanum are the three theological virtues: faith, hope and charity.

The first chapel on the right (Chapel of the Redeemer) houses a marble triptych attributed to Antonello Gagini. The second chapel on the right has an altarpiece depicting the Martyrdom of St Placidus by Giuseppe Patania.

The first chapel on the left (Baptistery) has a font with a bas-relief depicting the Original Sin (1497-1499) attributed to Antonello Gagini. The ciborium has a relief depicting the Passion of Christ, as well as Saint Peter and Paul.

The right transept has a venerated wooden crucifix and a Madonna della Vittoria attributed to the school of Gagini, and completed to celebrate the victory at Lepanto. The left transept has a statue of San Nicola di Bari by Filippo Quattrocchi, a follower of Gagini.

The main altarpiece depicts a Resurrection by Giuseppe Velasco. The sculptures around the main altar were created by the Li Volsi family, who also made the wooden choir.

Among the paintings and sculptures housed in the church are also:

- Madonna delle Grazie with Saints Rosalia and John the Baptist by Pietro Novelli;
- Assumption of Mary by Filippo Quattrocchi;
- Holy Family and Immaculate Conception by Filippo Randazzo;
- Resurrection and Rosary by Antonio Filingelli.
- Marble pulpit (octagonal) (1556) by Giandomenico Gagini

In the Chapter hall is housed a statue of St Nicolo by Filippo Quattrocchi; a canvas depicting St Eligius (1535) by Johannes De Matta; a Martyrdom of St Bartholemew by Jusepe de Ribera; a Martyrdom of St Sebastian by Salvator Rosa; and three canvases by Pietro Novelli: a Madonna and Child, St John and St Rosalia.

== Bibliography ==
- Gioacchino di Marzo; Cavagna Sangiuliani di Gualdana Lazelada di Bereguardo, Conte Antonio (1880). Stamperia del Giornale di Sicilia (ed.). I Gagini e la scultura in Sicilia nei secoli XV e XVI; memorie storiche e documenti, Volume I and II (in Italian). Palermo.
- Giuseppe Beritelli La Via, Alessio Narbone (1852). Stamperia di Giovanni Pedone (ed.). Notizie storiche di Nicosia (in Italian). Palermo. Giuseppe Beritelli La Via.
