= Nicosia, Sicily =

Nicosia Nicusìa (Sicilian) Nẹcọscia (Gallo-Italic)
- Comune
- Comune di Nicosia
- View of Nicosia

- Coat of arms

- Location within Italy Location within Sicily
- Coordinates: 37°45′N 14°24′E
- Country: Italy
- Region: Sicily
- Province: Enna (EN)
- Frazioni: Villadoro

Government
  - Mayor: Luigi Bonelli

Area
  - Total: 218.51 km^{2} (84.37 sq mi)
- Elevation: 724 m (2,375 ft)

Population (2026)
  - Total: 12,382
  - Density: 56.666/km^{2} (146.76/sq mi)
- Demonym: Nicosiani
- Time zone: UTC+1 (CET)
  - Summer (DST): UTC+2 (CEST)
- Postal code: 94014
- Dialing code: 0935
- Patron saint: St Nicholas of Bari
- Saint day: 6 December
- Website: Official website

Nicosia (Italian: [nikoˈziːa]; Sicilian: Nicusìa; Gallo-Italic of Sicily: Nẹcọscia) is a town and comune (municipality) in the Province of Enna in the autonomous island region of Sicily in Italy. It has 12,382 inhabitants.

It is located at 720 metres above sea level, on a rocky massive culminating in four imposing hills, and borders the municipalities of Calascibetta, Castel di Lucio, Cerami, Gagliano Castelferrato, Gangi, Geraci Siculo, Leonforte, Mistretta, Nissoria, and Sperlinga. Nicosia and Troina are the northernmost towns in the province of Enna. The vicinity was traditionally made up of salt mines and arable lands.

== History ==
Engio, Erbita and Imachara are the three cities of antiquity with which historians have attempted to identify Nicosia, but there is no evidence that the mentioned towns are in fact Nicosia. The present name of the town suggests Greek Origins: it is believed to get its name from Saint Nicholas (Νίκου Οίκος), who together with San Felix are the patrons of the town, Níkou Oíkos. Another theory suggests it is a derivative of the Greek saying "City of Victory" (Νίκης Οίκος, Níkēs Oíkos). The town is believed to stand on the site of the ancient Engynum. The modern town was founded by Byzantine colonists in the 6th century. It expanded under the Arab domination and later under that of the Normans, who settled numerous immigrants from Lombardy and Piedmont, called "Lombards", giving rise to the Gallo-Italic dialect still spoken in the town and surrounds. King William II made Nicosia a royal city. It played an important strategic role, favoured by its position halfway between Palermo and Messina. It often gave hospitality to important figures, including Emperor Charles V.

== Demographics ==
As of 2026, the population is 12,382, of which 48.7% are males, and 51.3% are females. Minors make up 13.0% of the population, and seniors make up 26.4%.

Historical population

Year	Pop.	±%
1861	15,030	—
1871	14,890	−0.9%
1881	15,276	+2.6%
1901	15,811	+3.5%
1911	16,921	+7.0%
1921	15,368	−9.2%
1931	20,531	+33.6%
1936	17,479	−14.9%

Year	Pop.	±%
1951	19,275	+10.3%
1961	18,191	−5.6%
1971	15,324	−15.8%
1981	15,212	−0.7%
1991	15,029	−1.2%
2001	14,812	−1.4%
2011	14,272	−3.6%
2021	12,877	−9.8%

Source: ISTAT

=== Immigration ===
As of 2025, immigrants make up 3.4% of the population. The 5 largest foreign countries of birth are Argentina, Romania, Germany, France, and Egypt.

== Urbanism ==
Nicosia's past and present structure shows the artistic and cultural heritage of the Byzantine occupation. Fragments of its history are noticeable everywhere: in its churches, in its palaces, in the villas and even in the poor residential area. There is a circular net of trails through different parts of Nicosia, which is clustered up onto "del Castello", "del Salvatore", "di Monteoliveto" and "dei Cappuccini" rocky hills. Because of its particular structure Nicosia looks like a "stairway to the sky". Walking through town, some of the main sights are the medieval and the baroque parts of town, with their aristocratic villas such as "La Motta Salinella", "La Motta S. Silvestro" and "La Via". Nicosia is perhaps better represented by its masserie, witnesses of the rural life and cultural legacy of generations of countrymen.

== Main sights ==
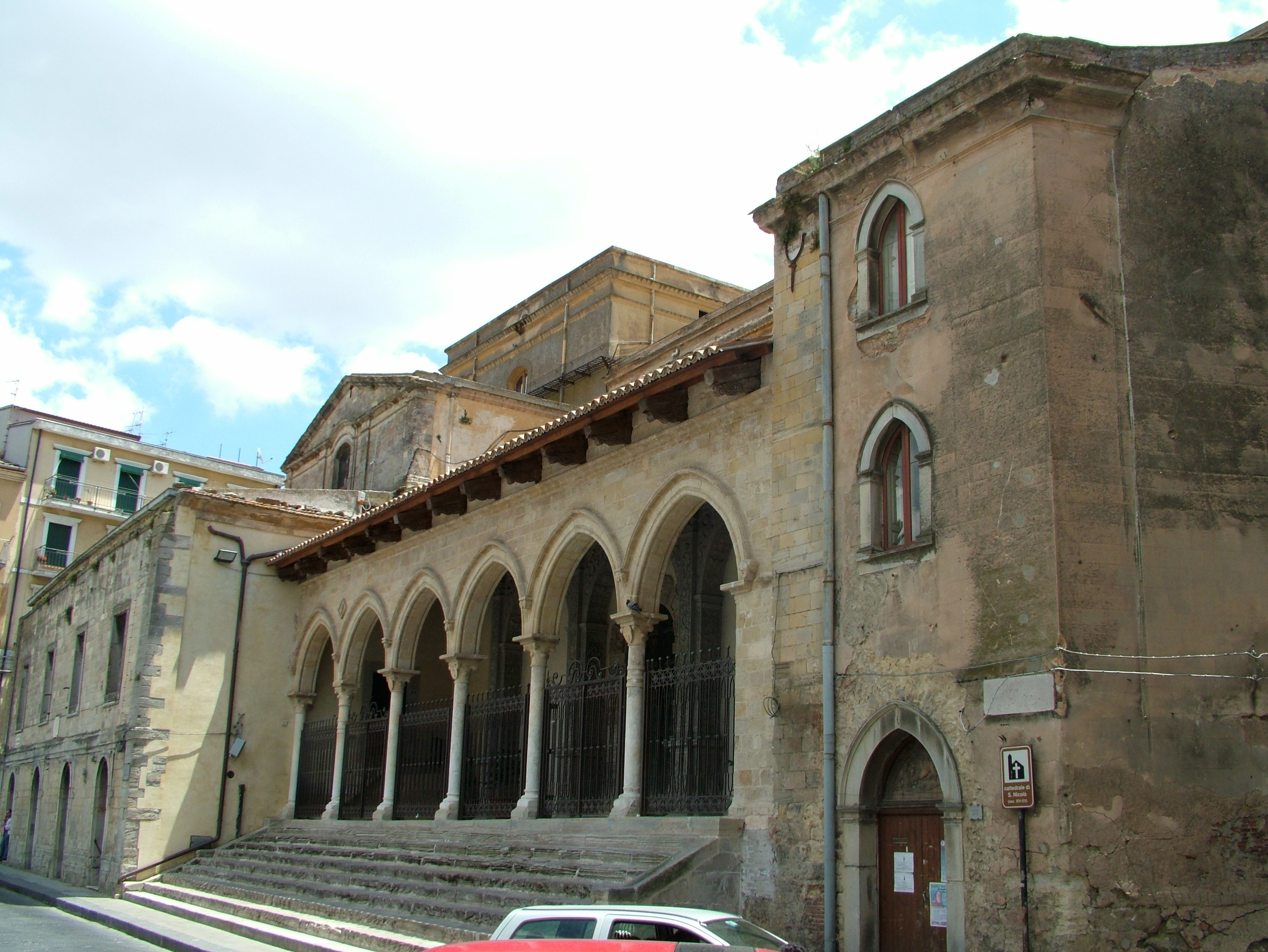
Nicosia Cathedral

- Cathedral: built in the 14th century over a pre-existing Norman edifice, is dedicated to St. Nicholas. The façade has a noteworthy 15th century portal, while the interior houses a painting by Jusepe de Ribera. The campanile is from the 13th century.
- Santa Maria Maggiore: contains a 16th-century holy water stoup, the throne of Charles V, a fine marble polyptych by Antonello Gagini.
- San Benedetto: 14th century church
- San Biagio: has paintings by Giuseppe Velasquez and a triptych by Antonello Gagini.
- Church of the Carmine: houses an Annunciation by Antonello Gagini.
- Santissimo Salvatore: church atop the peak above the town
- Palazzo Cirino

There are also remains of the Norman castle in the upper part of the town.

== See also ==
- Roman Catholic Diocese of Nicosia, Sicily
