= San Biagio, Nicosia =

Baroque Roman Catholic church

Coordinates: 37.74675°N 14.39879°E

San Biagio (Saint Blaise) is a Roman Catholic church located on via Francesco Randazzo #24 in the town of Nicosia, in the province of Enna, region of Sicily, Italy.

== History and description ==
A church at this site was built by 1433, adjacent to a Benedictine monastery. It was enlarged and refurbished in 1698 and 1729. A final restoration occurred in 2010-2011. The exterior of the church is undistinguished flat with a large cornice over a rectangular stone portal. After the late 19th-century suppression of the monasteries, part of this monastery was converted to private use, but a section was used as the local seminary for the bishopric until 1960.

The church has a single nave; the interior is richly decorated in late-Baroque stucco with gilded accents, completed by Serafino Perollo. The main altar has five canvases completed by Giuseppe Velasco from 1772 to 1775:

- St Blaise heals one sick with bubonic plague
- Extasis of Ste Scholastica
- Martyrdom of St Placidus and his companions
- Presentation of Jesus at the temple
- St Benedict topples the statue of Apollo

There is an altarpiece also on the topic of St Benedict by Velasco at the church of Concezione al Capo, Palermo.

Behind the canvas of St Blaise is an icon of the saint (1600) completed by Giovanni Battista Li Volsi, a sculptor native to Nicosia. He also sculpted a Flagellation of Christ located in the church. Housed in the church is a wooden tabernacle, originally from the church of Santa Maria di Gesù by either Pietro Bencivinni or a follower.
