= Johannes De Matta =

Spanish painter

Johannes De Matta, also known as Juan de Matta (15th century – 16th century) was a Spanish painter.

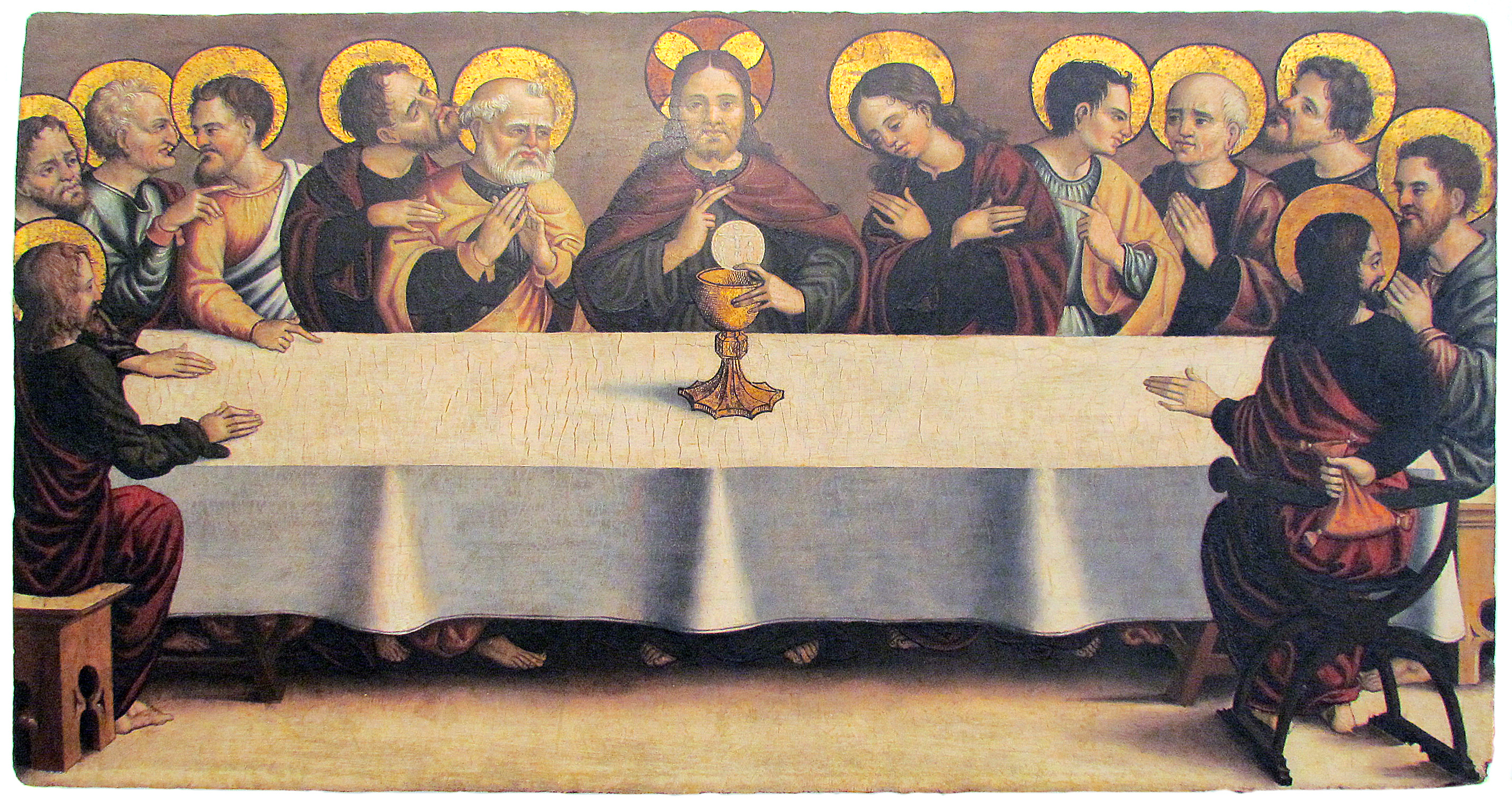
Ultima Cena, Mandralisca Museum, Cefalù.

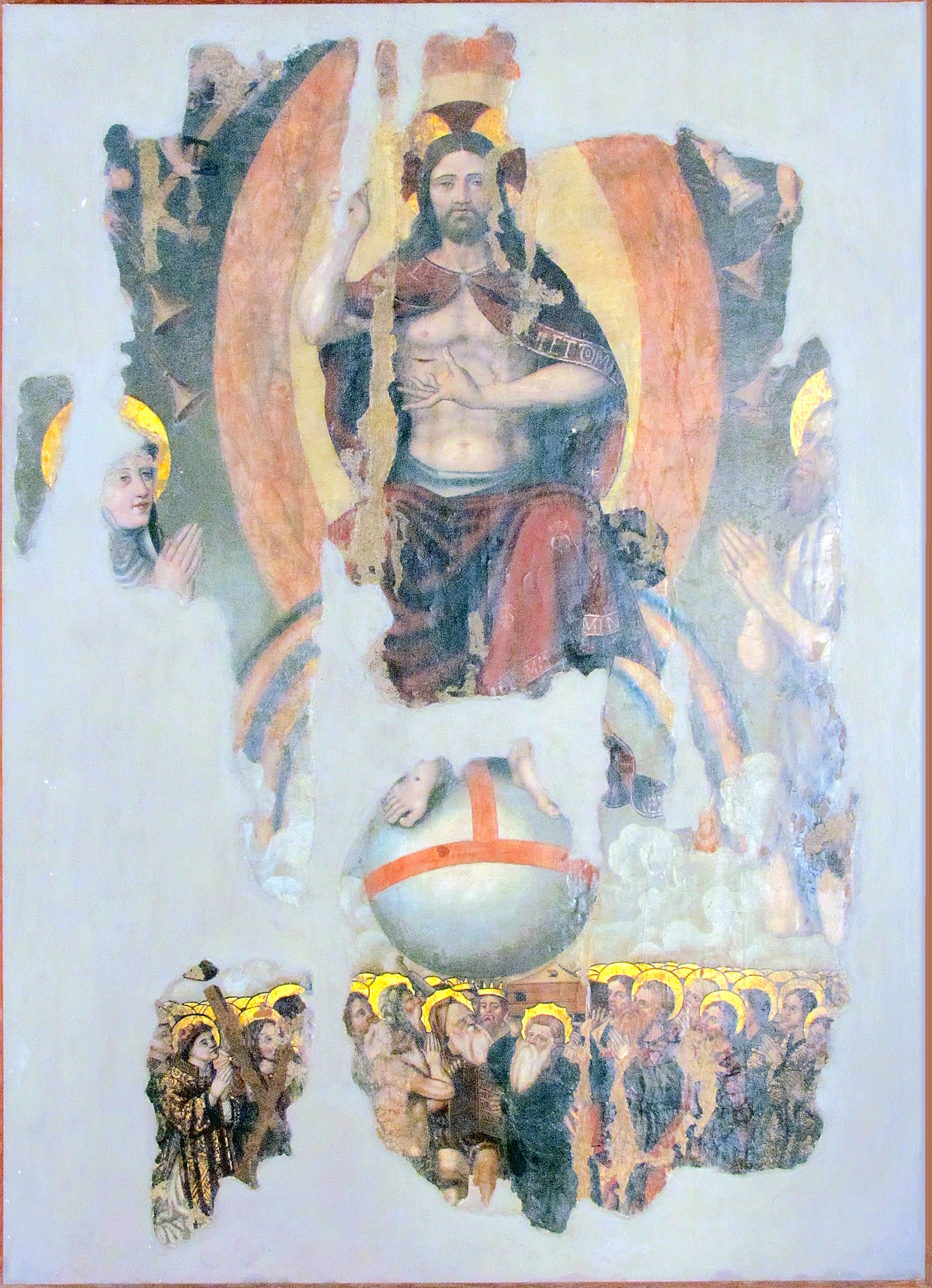
Giudizio Universale, Mandralisca Museum, Cefalù.

He was born in Valencia. Few and fragmentary biographical details are known about his professional training, which included a stay in Naples at the beginning of the 16th century.

He was primarily active in the areas surrounding modern-day Madonie. De Matta resided in Polizzi Generosa, where he also ran his workshop. The artist is documented to have also visited Palermo in the period between 1536 and 1537.

Some of his works can be found in Termini Imerese, Caltagirone and Sutera.

== Works ==
=== Enna and its province ===
==== Nicosia ====
- 1535, Sant'Eligio, painting in the chapter house of the Nicosia Cathedral.

=== Palermo and its province ===
==== Caltavuturo ====
- 16th century, Adorazione dei Magi, painting in the Cathedral of the Holy Apostles Peter and Paul.

==== Cefalù ====
- 16th century, Ultima Cena, painting in the collection of the Mandralisca Museum.
- 1530–1539, Giudizio Universale, oil on panel (altarpiece) transferred to canvas showing Christ between the Virgin Mary and Saint John the Baptist, below the souls of the "elect", the painting used to be part of the collection of lawyer Cirincione, and was given on permanent deposit to the Mandralisca Museum in Cefalù.

==== Polizzi Generosa ====
Church of Saint Mary of the Assumption:

- 1521, Andata al Calvario, an imitation of Spasimo di Sicilia, a painting produced around the time of the arrival of Raffaello Sanzio's painting in Palermo.
- 1524, Tre angeli cantori, oil on panel.
- c. 1540, Strage degli Innocenti, gouache.
- c. 1540, Martirio dei Diecimila Martiri, oil on canvas.
- 16th century, Custodia del Sacramento, posthumous decoration of marble apparatus.
- 16th century, Deposizione dalla croce, documented work.
- c. 1530, Compianto su Cristo Morto con San Sebastiano e Santa Caterina d'Alessandria, painting commissioned by the La Farina family, which was initially installed in the Church of Saint Mary of Jesus of the Order of Friars Minor and is now kept in the Church of San Girolamo.
- 1541, Madonna del Carmine, oil on canvas, can be found in chiesa del Carmine.
- 16th century, San Gandolfo e storie della sua vita, triptych, Church of the College of Mary, formerly the Church of San Gandolfo La Povera.

==== Pollina ====
- 16th century, Santi Giovanni e Paolo, diptych in the cathedral of Saints John and Paul.

==== Others ====
- 1536, processional banner painted by the artist depicting the Annunciation, the resurrection of Christ, the Transfiguration, the Apostles, St Michael the Archangel, St John the Evangelist, was originally commissioned by the Brotherhood of St John the Evangelist.

== Bibliography ==
- Gioacchino di Marzo (1880). "I Gagini e la scultura in Sicilia nei secoli XV e XVI; memorie storiche e documenti" (in Italian). Vol. I e II. Conte Antonio Cavagna Sangiuliani di Gualdana Lazelada di Bereguardo. Palermo: Stamperia del Giornale di Sicilia.
- Termotto, Rosario; Marino, Gabriele (2013). "Conoscere il territorio: Arte e Storia delle Madonie. Studi in memoria di Nico Marino" (in Italian). Vol. I. Cefalù: Associazione Culturale «Nico Marino». ISBN 978-1-291-58694-7.
- Teresa Viscuso (1999). "Matta. Me. Pïxît: la congiuntura Flandro - Iberica e la cultura figurativa nell'entroterra madonita" in "Vincenzo degli Azani da Pavia e la cultura figurativa in Sicilia nell'età di Carlo V" (in Italian). Siracusa: Ediprint.
- Francesco Abbate (1997). "Storia dell'arte nell'Italia meridionale. Il Cinquecento" (in Italian). Roma: Progetti Donzelli. ISBN 88-7989-653-9.

== Sister projects ==
- Wikimedia Commons contiene immagini o altri file su Johannes De Matta
