= Giuseppe Tresca =

Italian painter

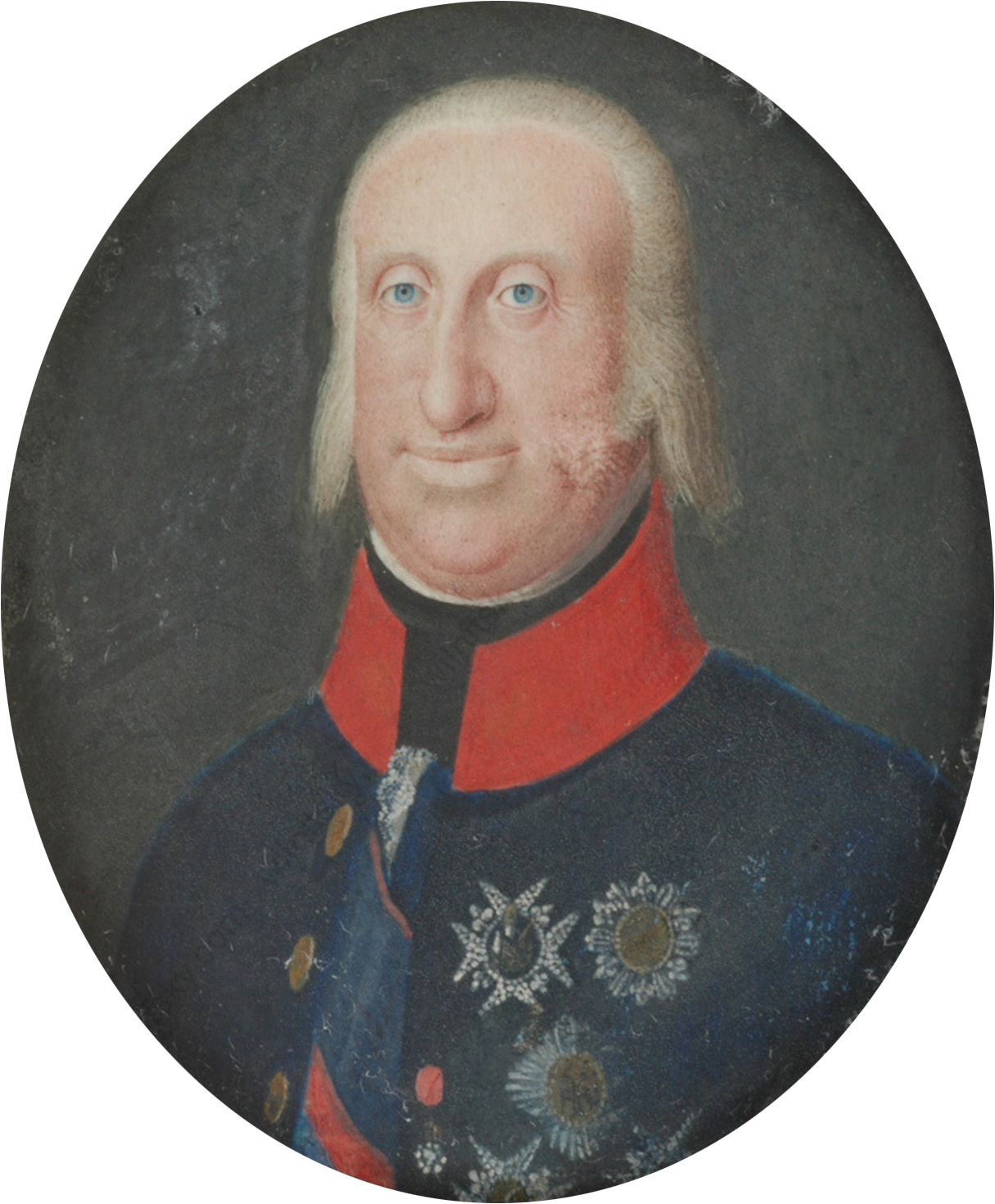

Giuseppe Tresca (1710–1795) was an Italian painter, active in a late Baroque or Rococo style.

He was born in Sciacca, Sicily, but trained in Rome under Sebastiano Conca. He returned to become a respected painter in Palermo, where he became the master of Giuseppe Velazquez. He died in Palermo. He painted with Velazquez the nave ceiling of the Chiesa Madre of Castellamare del Golfo.
