= Chiesa del Carmine, Nicosia =

Roman Catholic church in Sicily, Italy

Coordinates: 37.°N 14.°E

The Chiesa del Carmine (Church of the Carmine) is a Roman Catholic church located on via Giuseppe Li Volsi in the town of Nicosia, in the province of Enna, region of Sicily, Italy. It rises next the former Convent of the Santissima Annunziata, also called the convent of the Maria Vergine del Monte Carmelo.

== History and description ==
This convent was first erected in the 9th century, when the existing city was only a series of buildings around a castle. By the 12th-century a chapel had been erected here, and over the centuries it was enlarged. By 1650, the eremitic convent consisted of 12 cells, and the church had ten chapels. Most of the convent was demolished in 1929 to build the middle school, while the church was converted to a Marian sanctuary in 1964. The concave facade was erected in the 18th century. The belltower was added in the recent past centuries.

The interior of the church has a main altar with a tabernacle, sculpted by Giuseppe Finocchiaro; a bronze crucifix by E. Tesei. A canvas depicting St Simone Stock and a St Theresa and the Child Jesus (after 1964) was painted by M.P. Rallo of Catania. She also painted a Via Crucis. The marble statuary group depicting the Annunciation (1433) was sculpted by Antonello Gagini.
