= Vito Maria Amico =

Italian historian

Vito Maria Amico OSB
- Born: February 15, 1697; Catania, Kingdom of Sicily
- Died: 5 October 1762 (aged 65); Catania, Kingdom of Sicily
- Occupations: Christian monk, university teacher, medievalist, geographer
- Title: abbot

Academic background
- Influences: Flavio Biondo; Tommaso Fazello; Rocco Pirri

Academic work
- Discipline: Medieval studies
- Sub-discipline: History of Sicily, Topography
- Institutions: University of Catania
- Influenced: Gioacchino Di Marzo

Vito Maria Amico (15 February 1697 - 5 December 1762) was an Italian monk, historian and writer. He is most notable for the last work published in his lifetime, Lexicon topographicum Siculum..., a topographical dictionary of Sicily published between 1757 and 1760, describing its history, settlements and best-known families, monuments and churches.

== Life ==
He was born in Catania to Vito Amico and Anna Statella, both from Catanese noble families. He entered the Monastery of San Nicolò l'Arena in Catania aged sixteen, becoming its prior aged 34. He later became overall prior of all 25 Benedictine monasteries in Messina, Militello, Castelbuono and Monreale and was made abbot in 1757.

His passion for knowledge led him to research Sicilian history and natural history in Etna's lava fields and to search for fossils in Militello. He also collected pottery, vases, medals and coins from archaeological excavations, later donating them to Catania's Museo di antichità greco-romane, sited beside the University of Catania's library, which he had founded himself - in a short period that museum had a notable collection. He later took the chair in secular history at the same university and founded Catania's first public library. He was made "royal historian" by Carlo di Borbone in 1751.

== Works ==
- Sicilia sacra disquisitionibus, et notitiis illustrata... (Panormi, 1733–1734) (Online edition: tomo I, 1733)
- Catania illustrata, sive sacra et civilis urbis Catanae Historia... (Catanae, 1740–1746) (Online edition: parte II, 1741; parte III, 1741; parte IV, 1746)
- De recta civilis Historiae comparandae ratione (Catanae, 1744)
- Dei limiti intorno ai quali deve contenersi la sana e saggia critica, e della esorbitanza dello scrivere (Catanae, 1744)
- Lexicon topographicum Siculum... (Panormi, 1757–1760) (Online edition: volume I, parts I-II, 1757; volume II, 1759; volume III, 1760)

=== Published posthumously ===
- Storia di Sicilia dal 1556 al 1750, per servire di continuazione a quella del Fazello. Translated by Giuseppe Bertini. Palermo: stamperia d'Antonio Muratori. 1836.
- Dizionario topografico della Sicilia di Vito Amico, translated from Latin and annotated by Gioacchino Di Marzo (Palermo, 1855–1856) (Online edition: Volume I, first edition, 1855; Volume I, second edition, 1858)

== Bibliography ==
- Zapperi, Roberto (1960). "AMICO, Vito Maria". Dizionario Biografico degli Italiani (in Italian). Vol. 2: Albicante–Ammannati. Rome: Istituto dell'Enciclopedia Italiana. OCLC 883370.
