= Santissima Trinità, Petralia Sottana =

Church building in Petralia Sottana, Italy

Coordinates: 37.80786°N 14.09383°E

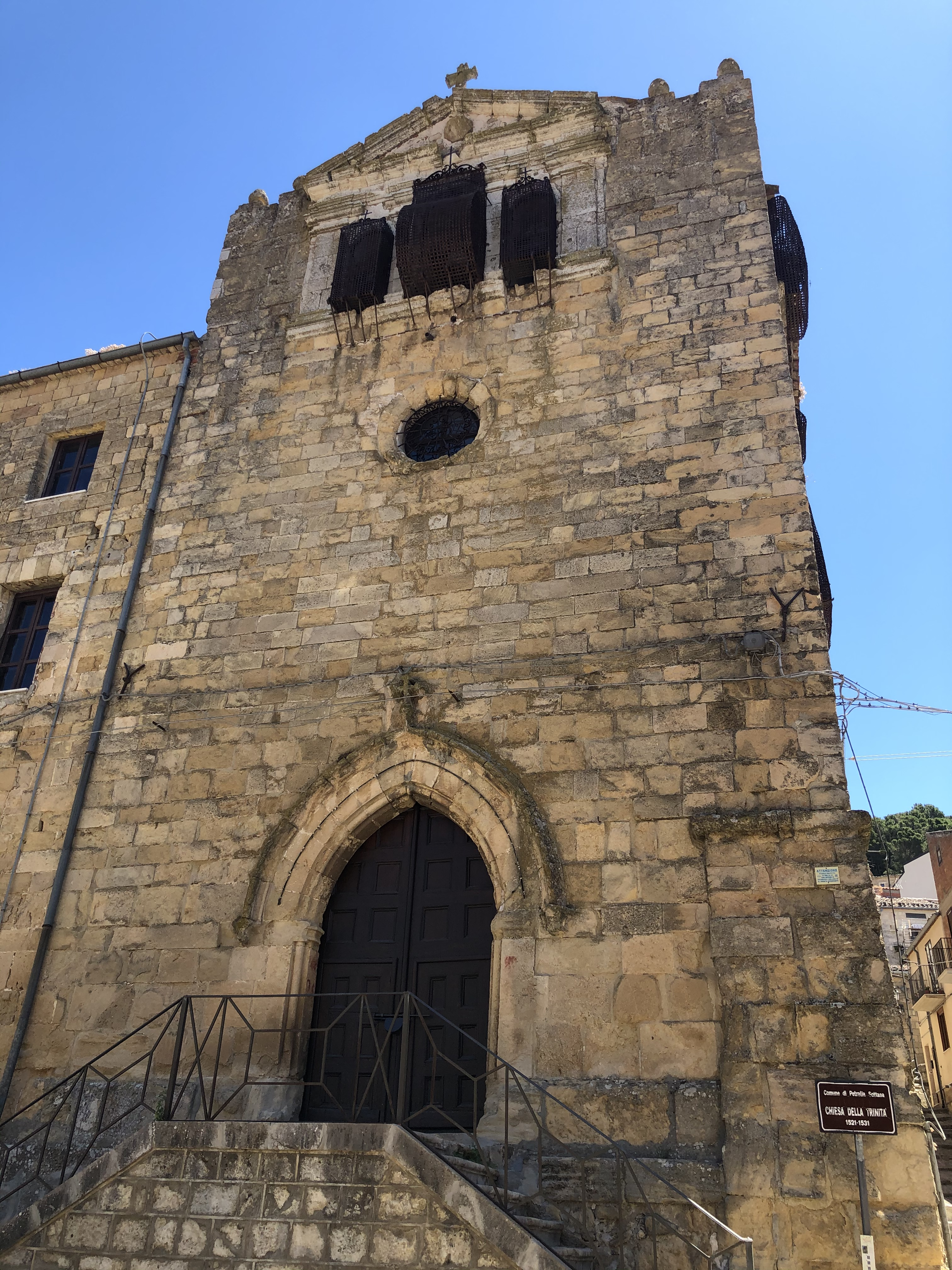
Facade of church

Santissima Trinità is a Roman Catholic church building, attached to a cloistered Dominican abbey for nuns, is located in the district of Carminello, just outside the town center of Petralia Sottana, province of Palermo, Sicily.

== History ==
The church and abbey (badia) were commissioned first by the Countess Maria Ventimiglia of Collesano, the Marquis of Geraci's sister, and mainly completed by 1531. Further refurbishments were pursued in the following centuries. In 1866, the monastery was suppressed, but they returned and the convent is still active.

The tall facade is a simple stone face, with an ogival portal, a small round window, and at the top three protruding iron window grills. The cloistered nuns can view the town and service from behind these metal grills. The church has confessional boxes and windows by which nuns could receive the sacrament of confession and the eucharist. The organ was probably built in 1751 by Baldassare Di Paola and Ignazio Faraci. On the apse wall is a large marble polyptych, carved by Giandomenico, son of Antonello Gagini, prior to 1543. The sections depict scenes from the Life of Christ. To the right of the main altar is a canvas depicting the Virgin of the Rosary by Raffaele Visalli. Another lateral altarpiece depicts a Deposition from the Cross (1852) by Andrea D’Antoni.
