= Sant'Ippolito, Palermo =

Church in Palermo, Italy

Sant'Ippolito
- Chiesa di Sant'Ippolito Martire (in Italian)
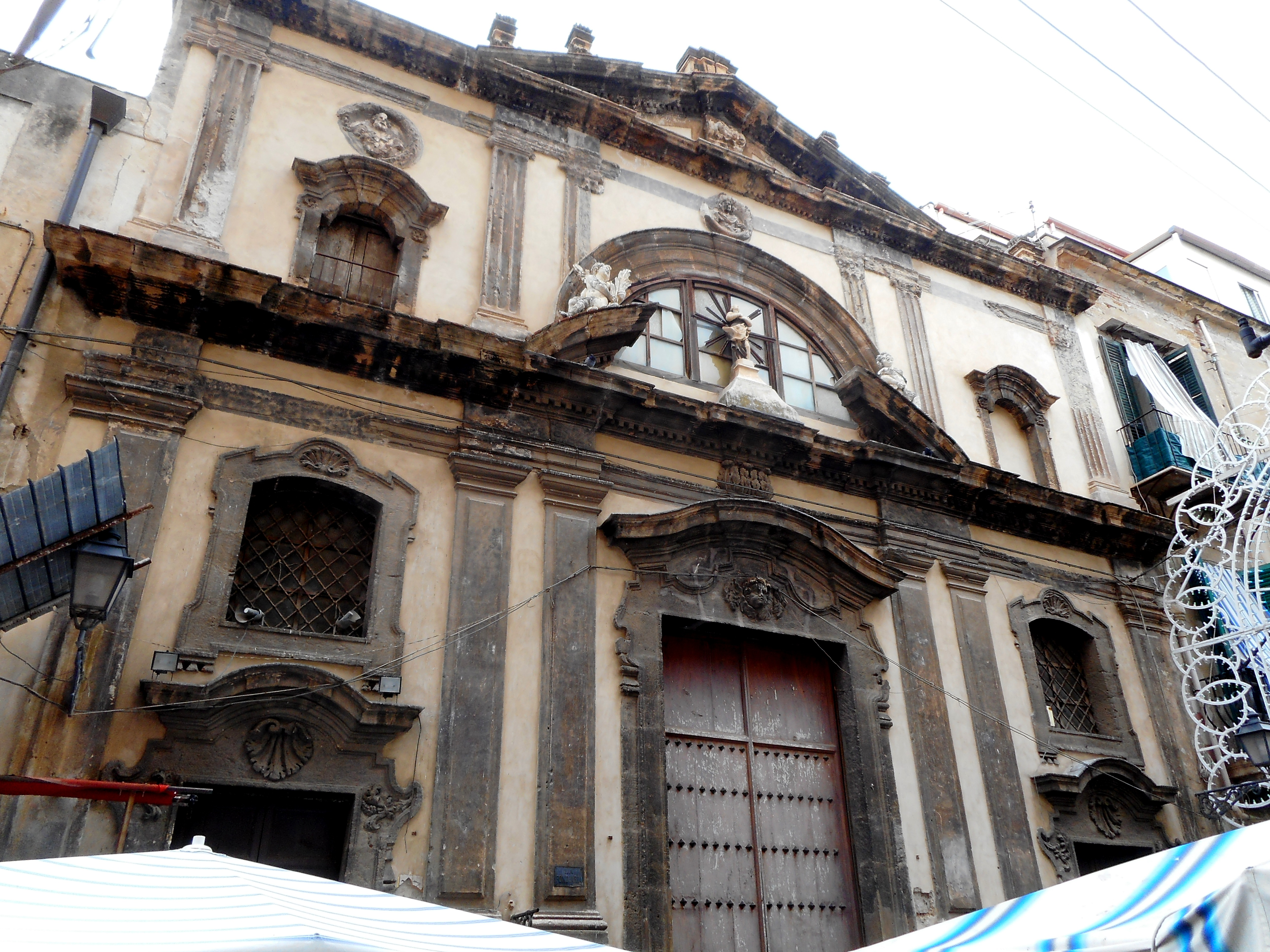
- Facade

Religion
- Affiliation: Roman Catholic
- Province: Archdiocese of Palermo
- Rite: Roman Rite

Location
- Location: Palermo, Italy
- Interactive map of Sant'Ippolito
- Coordinates: 38.11832°N 13.35434°E

Architecture
- Style: Sicilian Baroque
- Groundbreaking: 1717
- Completed: 1728

Sant'Ippolito Martire (Chiesa di Sant'Ippolito Martire) is a Baroque, Roman Catholic parish church in Palermo, region of Sicily, Italy. It is located on a busy street with markets, on via Porta Carini 37 in the historic Capo quarter, across the street from the church of the Immacolata Concezione al Capo. It remains an active parish of the Archdiocese of Palermo.

Sant'Ippolito is one of the few churches in Palermo that preserves the traditional Easter Vigil ceremony known as "Â calata 'a tila" ("the lowering of the cloth"), during which a large painting of the Passion is dramatically unveiled at the singing of the Gloria, symbolizing Christ's Resurrection.

== History ==
A parish church at the site is first mentioned in 1308. In 1583, during the Spanish rule of Sicily, the church was expanded; but the present church is a product of a refurbishment started in 1717 using designs by Andrea Palma. His grandson, Nicolò Palma, helped restore the church in 1769 and a further refurbishment was performed in 1844 under Giovanni Patricolo, who directed some of the fresco decoration.

== Architecture ==
The church is built in the Sicilian Baroque style. Its façade features a portal decorated with bas-reliefs depicting Saints Peter, Hippolytus, and Paul. The interior has a Latin-cross plan with three naves and side chapels. The nave ceiling has a fresco depicting Jesus in Lake Tiberius, retouched in the 1950s.
