= Santissimo Salvatore, Nicosia =

Baroque Roman Catholic church

Coordinates: 37.74761°N 14.39638°E

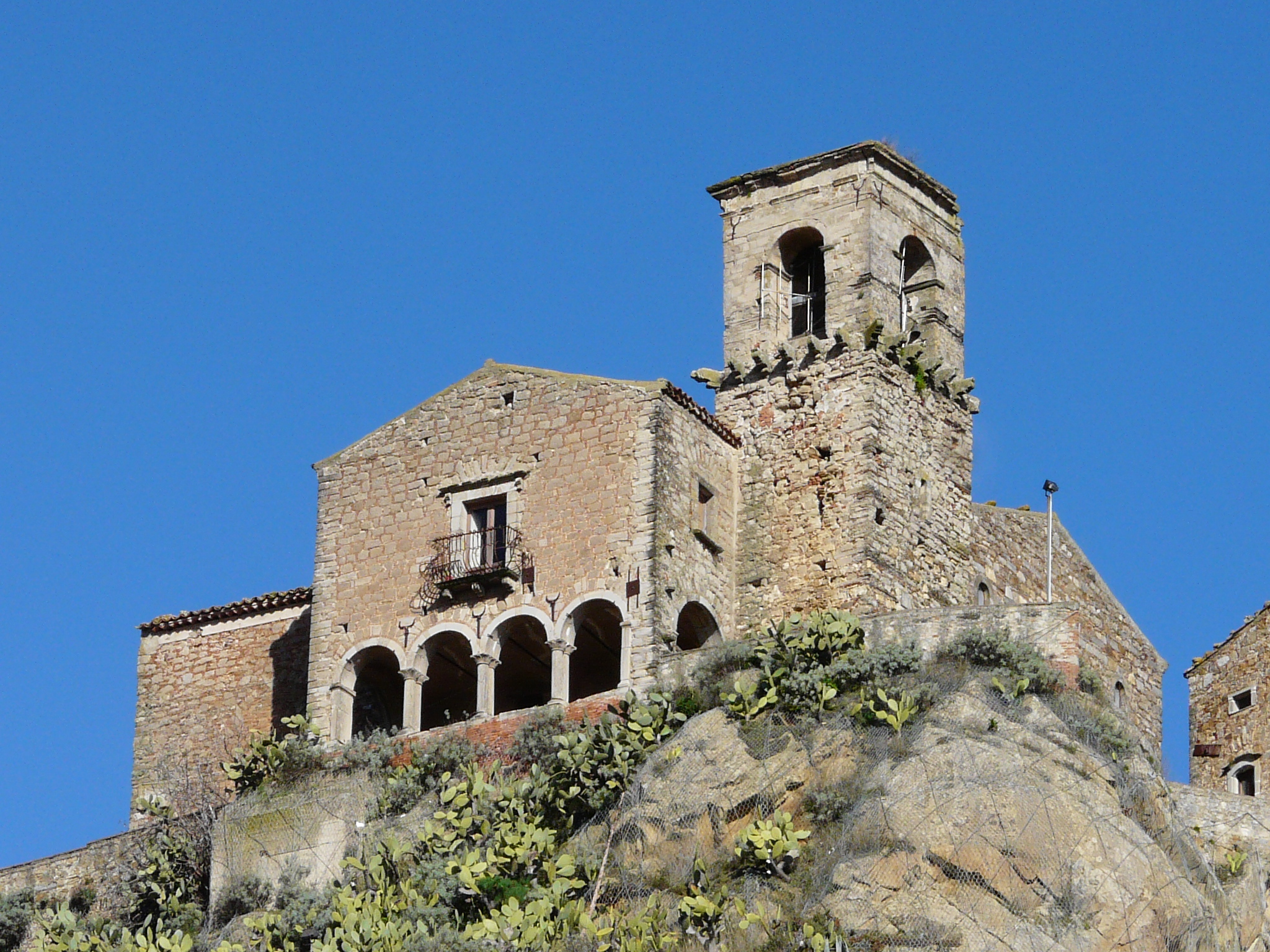
View of the four arches of the side facade of the church and bell-tower from below

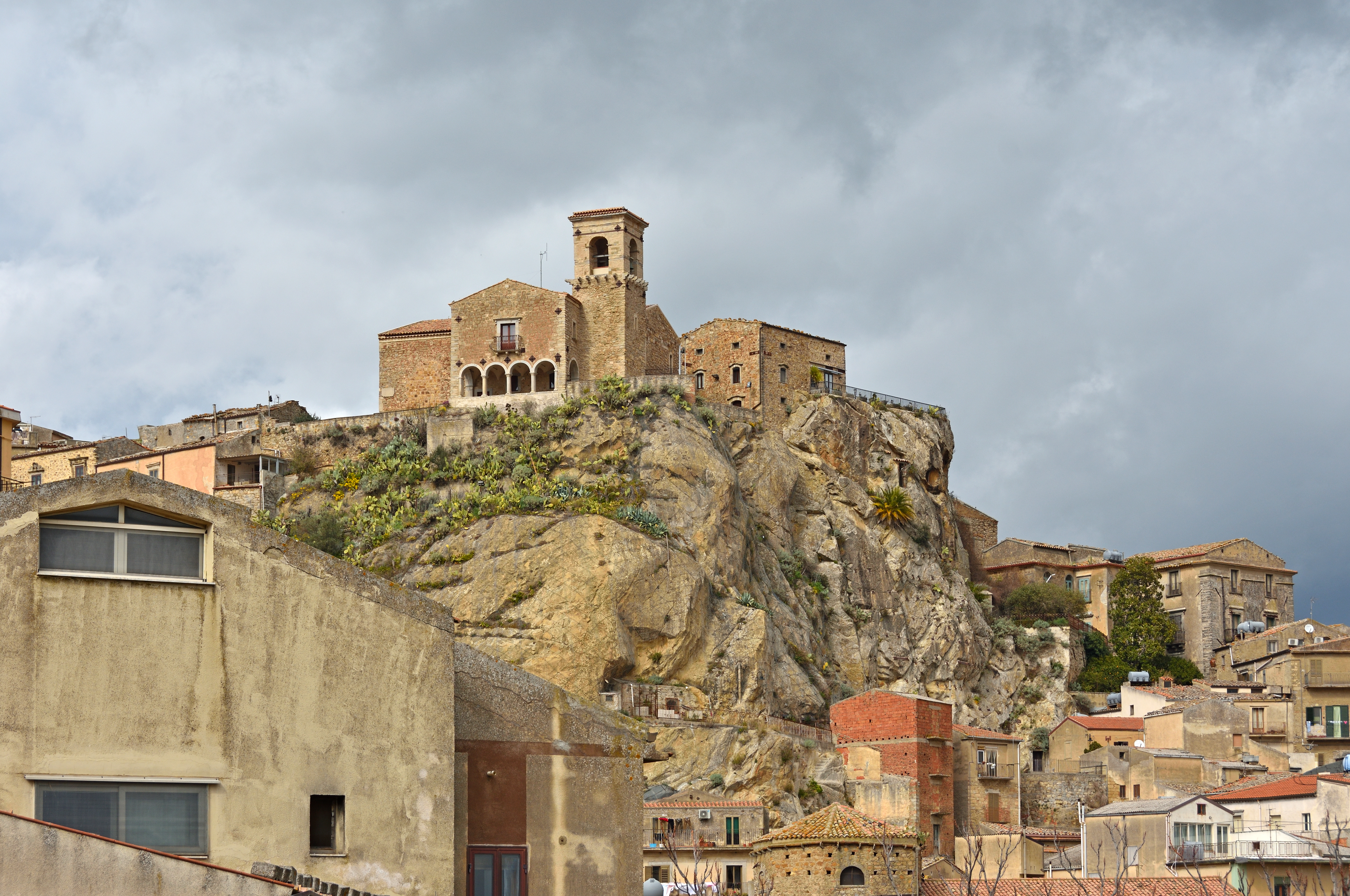
View from afar of the church

Santissimo Salvatore (Holiest Savior) is a Roman Catholic church located in a rocky hilltop above the town of Nicosia, in the province of Enna, region of Sicily, Italy.

== History and description ==
A church was erected at this summit circa the year 1100; when that church collapsed in 1607, it was rebuilt. The belltower still retains a Romanesque structure. The church is accessible through a staircase rising from via San Salvatore. The facade of the church has four arches, some including columns from the first church. The interior houses a canvas depicting the Madonna della Consolazione (1648) by A. Cardella. There is a wooden statue of the Transubstantion of Christ by Quattrocchi. There is a canvas depicting lo Spasimo by Nicolò Mirabella.
