= Pietro Volpes =

Italian painter (1827–1924)

Pietro Volpes (October 28, 1827 – March 8, 1924) was an Italian painter.

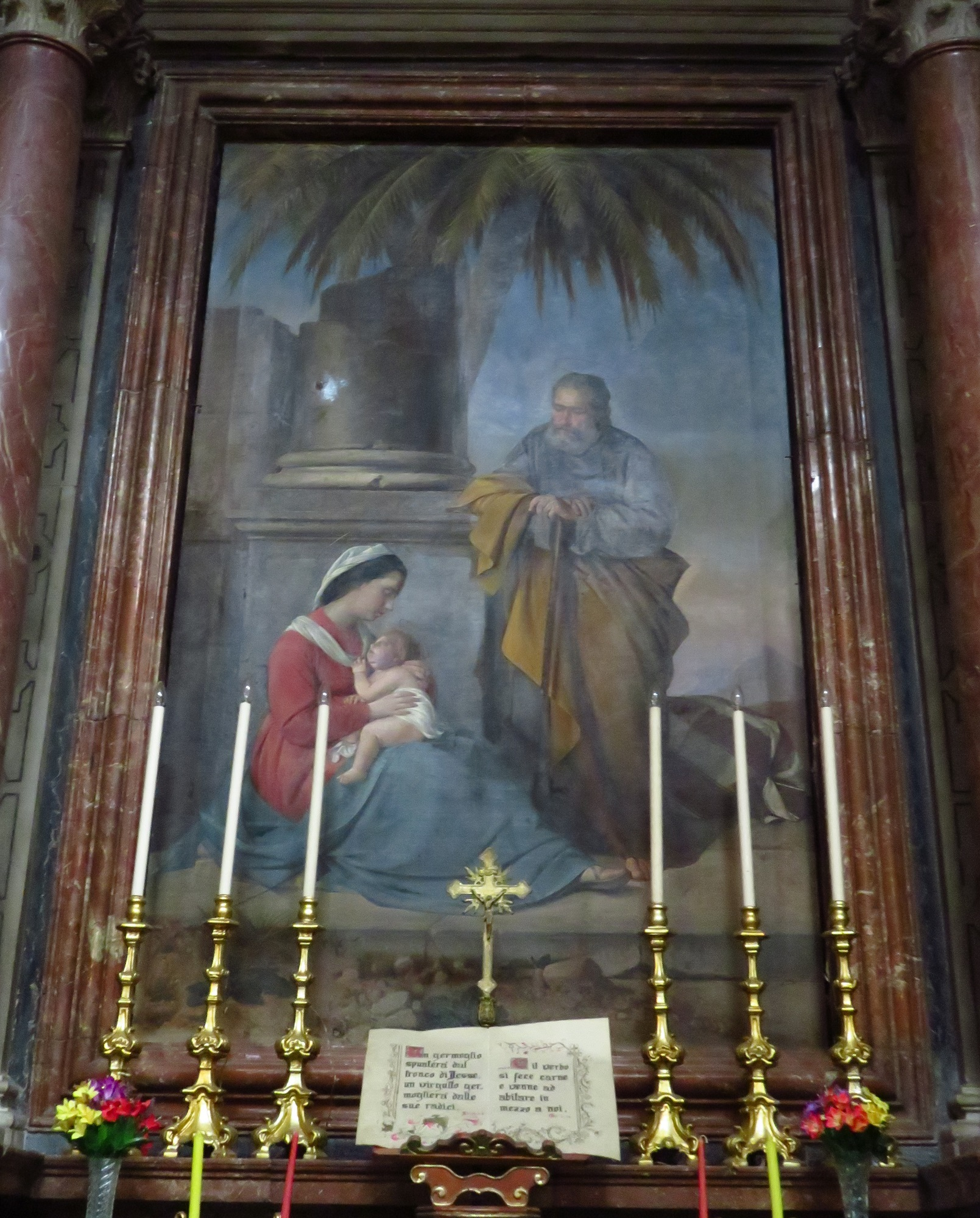
Rest during Flight from Egypt in the church of Sant'Ignazio all'Olivella in Palermo

He was born in Palermo. He studied first with Giuseppe Patania, then with Andrea D'Antoni. Because of his antipathy to the Bourbon rule of Naples, he was never in competition for stipends to study in Rome. He had fought in 1848 with the revolutionary forces in Sicily. In 1858, he did get permission to travel to Rome, where he stayed two years.

Among his works are: Portrait of a King, awarded with a gold medal second class in 1853 at Palermo; Portrait muliebre, also awarded a gold medal at Palermo; La moglie di un esule, in 1865, once in the Museo Nazionale of Palermo; Il prete reazionario; La preghiera, exhibited, in 1861 at Florence; Rest during Flight from Egypt, for the church of Sant'Ignazio all'Olivella in Palermo; Voluttà estiva; Interior of the Cappella Palatina; a second Interior of the Cappella Palatina; Un assente al Te Deum, which raised the anger of prelates, who sought to destroy the work. He received a medal at the 1886 International Exposition of Liverpool. His work of Famiglia Povera is located in the Galleria d’arte moderna of Palermo.

He was much in demand as a teacher, among his pupils was Onofrio Tomaselli the Elder, Eleonora Arangi., and Antonio Ugo. He was awarded a medal by the Circolo Artistico of Palermo in 1919.

He is buried in the Santa Maria dei Rotoli cemetery in Palermo.
