= Santa Maria Maggiore, Nicosia =

Church in Sicily, Italy

Coordinates: 37.74896°N 14.40144°E

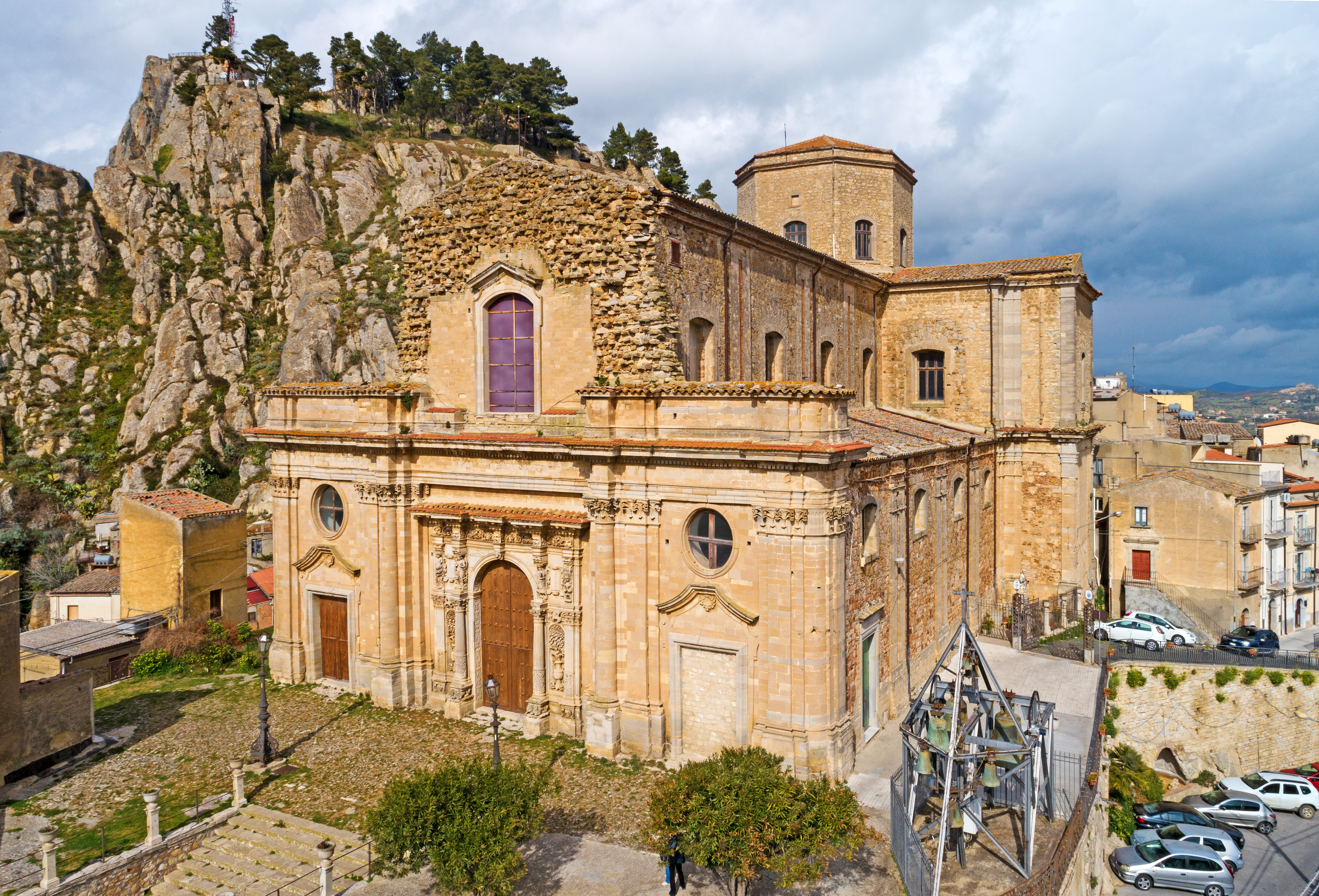
Facade of church with decorated portal and unfinished second story

Santa Maria Maggiore ('Saint Mary the Greater') is the Roman Catholic church located on Largo Santa Maria Maggiore in the town of Nicosia, in the province of Enna, region of Sicily, Italy.

== History and description ==
A church at this site was erected in the 12th century, replacing a pre-existing mosque, by the Norman conqueror, Conte Ruggero. The church was initially called Santa Maria la Scala, presumably because of its elevation atop a hill relative to the town. Immigration to Troini led to the expansion of the church, and its rededication in 1207 as Santa Maria Maggiore. This church was destroyed in 1757 by landslides. Reconstruction of the basilica began in 1767 under the architect Serafino da Catania, but only by 1800 were all three naves completed. Consecration is recalled by the fresco by Ettore Ximenes in the vault of the apse. The second story of the facade remains unfinished. In front of the church, at the street level, is the small oratory or chapel of San Sebastiano.

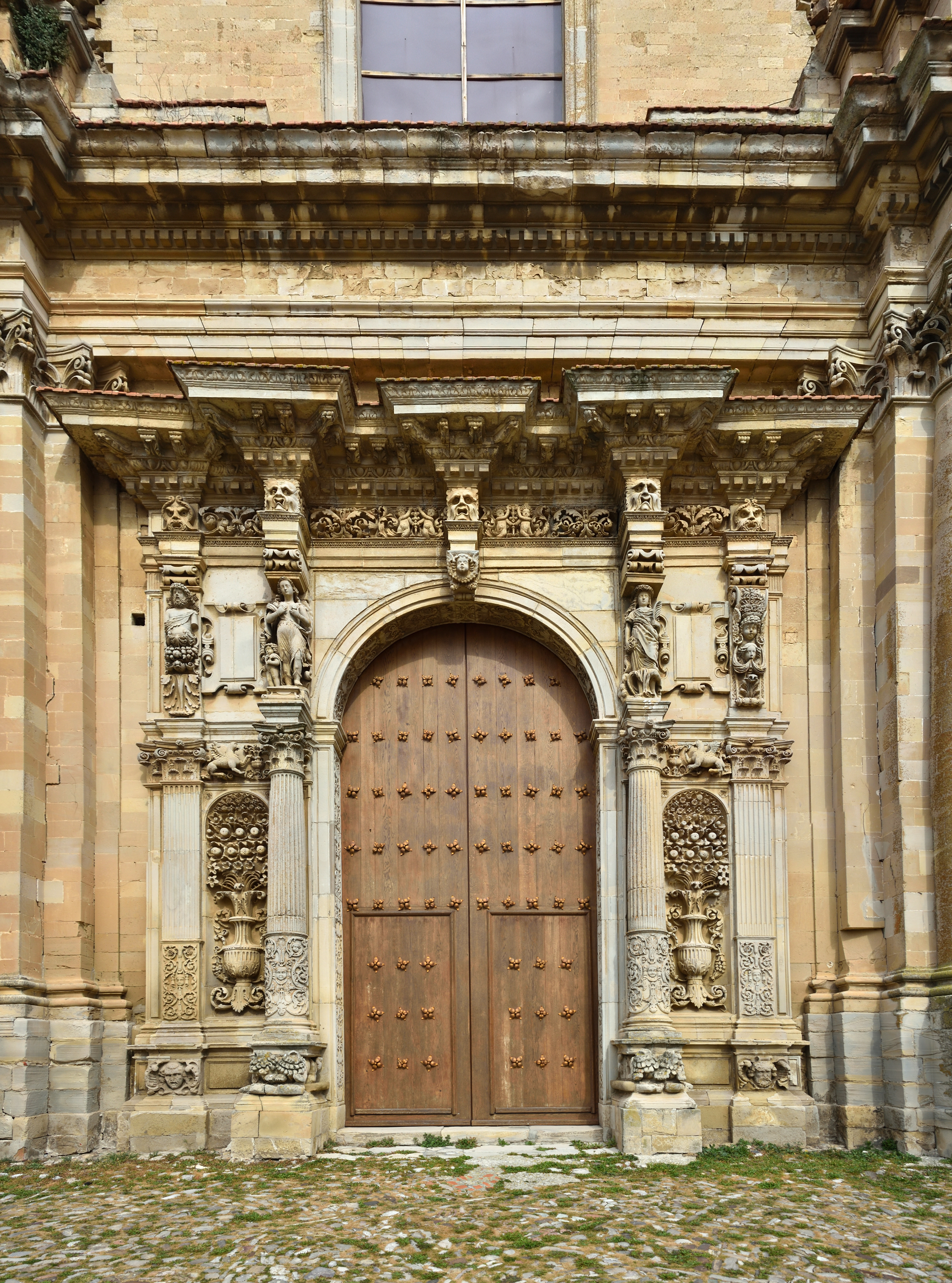
Main portal with pagan statues

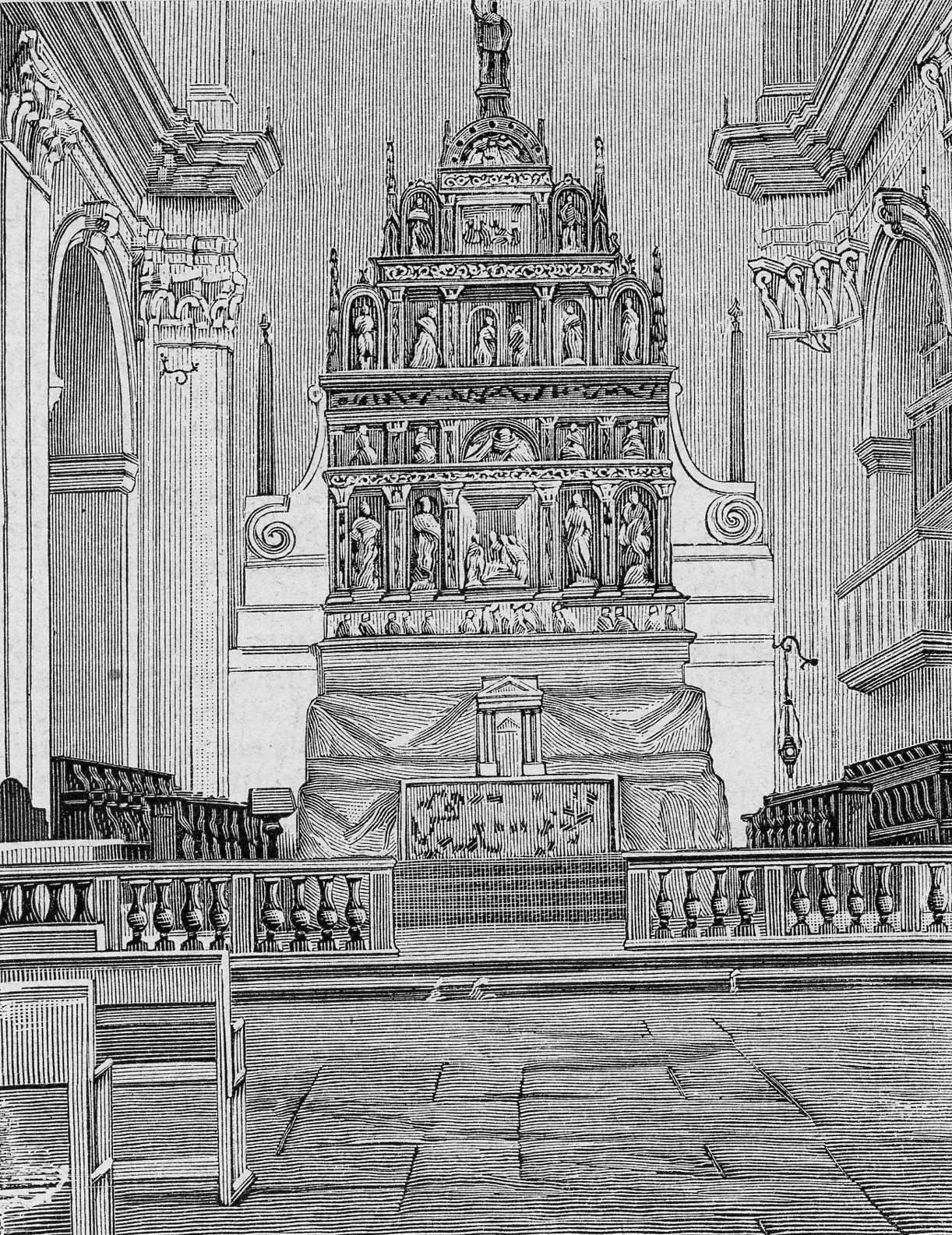
Engraving of the Cona del Gagini

The facade is preceded by a scenic staircase leading to the highly sculpted central portal. This portal was donated by a local noble, the Baron of Sant'Agrippina. Atypical for churches, it contains pagan imagery atop the pilasters, depicting from right to left: 1) Bacchus, god of wine; 2) Venus, goddess of love with Cupid; 3) goddess Ceres with a palm leaf in her hand, and 4) Aeolus, the god of winds. The flanking smaller portals include the one intended for the Congregation of the Monte di Pietà and on the right, the door used only in the Jubilee.

The central nave leads to the main altar sculpted by Salvatore Valenti; but behind is the masterwork in the church, the marble Cona by Antonello Gagini, which was present in the prior church since 1512. The work depicts scenes from the life of the Virgin, surrounded by sculptures of the saints and evangelists. Atop the structure is a statue of St Michael the Archangel. In the half-dome of the apse, is a fresco depicting the Coronation of the Virgin (1903) by Ettore Ximenes. The fresco incorporated portraits of prominent townspeople.

The altar in the right nave has a 17th-century crucifix by Vincenzo Calamaro, whose veneration grew when it was used in processions during plague epidemics in past centuries. In the altar on the left is a copy of the Crucifixion by Tintoretto found in the Scuola Grande di San Rocco in Venice.

The church has a wooden episcopal throne, putatively used by Emperor Charles V on his visit of the city, and thus now decorated with a Hapsburg double headed eagle. In the church are some wooden icons attriputed to Giambattista Li Volsi; a marble Madonna attributed to Francesco Laurana; and an altarpiece depicting the Martyrdom of St Lawrence by Giacomo Campione.
