= Palazzo Cirino, Nicosia =

Coordinates: 38.°N 13.°E

The Palazzo Cirino is a palace in the historic town center in Nicosia, region of Sicily, Italy.

The three-story palace was begun in the 18th century, commissioned by Graziano Cirino, and completed by the beginning of the 19th century. It was refurbished in 1850 by Luigi Cirino. The ground floor has rusticated stone decoration. The upper floors are articulated with pilasters and arches and ringed toward the street with metal balconies. The piano nobile is a private law firm, the ceiling of the main salon was frescoed with the Judgement of Paris by Natale Attanasio.
