= Andrea D'Antoni =

Italian painter

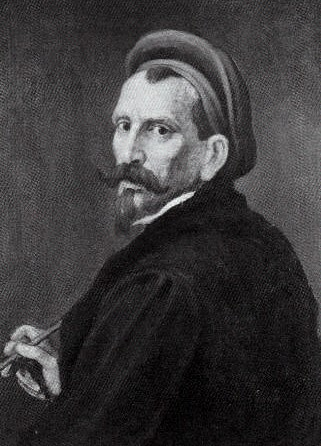
- Self-portrait
- Born: circa 2 January 1811; Palermo, Italy
- Died: circa 1 January 1868 (aged 56); Palermo, Italy
- Known for: Painter
- Movement: Neoclassicism

Andrea D'Antoni (1811–1868) was an Italian painter of the Neoclassical period.

== Life ==
He studied under Giuseppe Patania. One of his pupils was Pietro Volpes. Some of his works are displayed in the Galleria d'Arte Moderna di Sant'Anna in Palermo. He painted a Deposition from the Cross (1852) for the church of Santissima Trinità, Petralia Sottana.

== Gallery ==
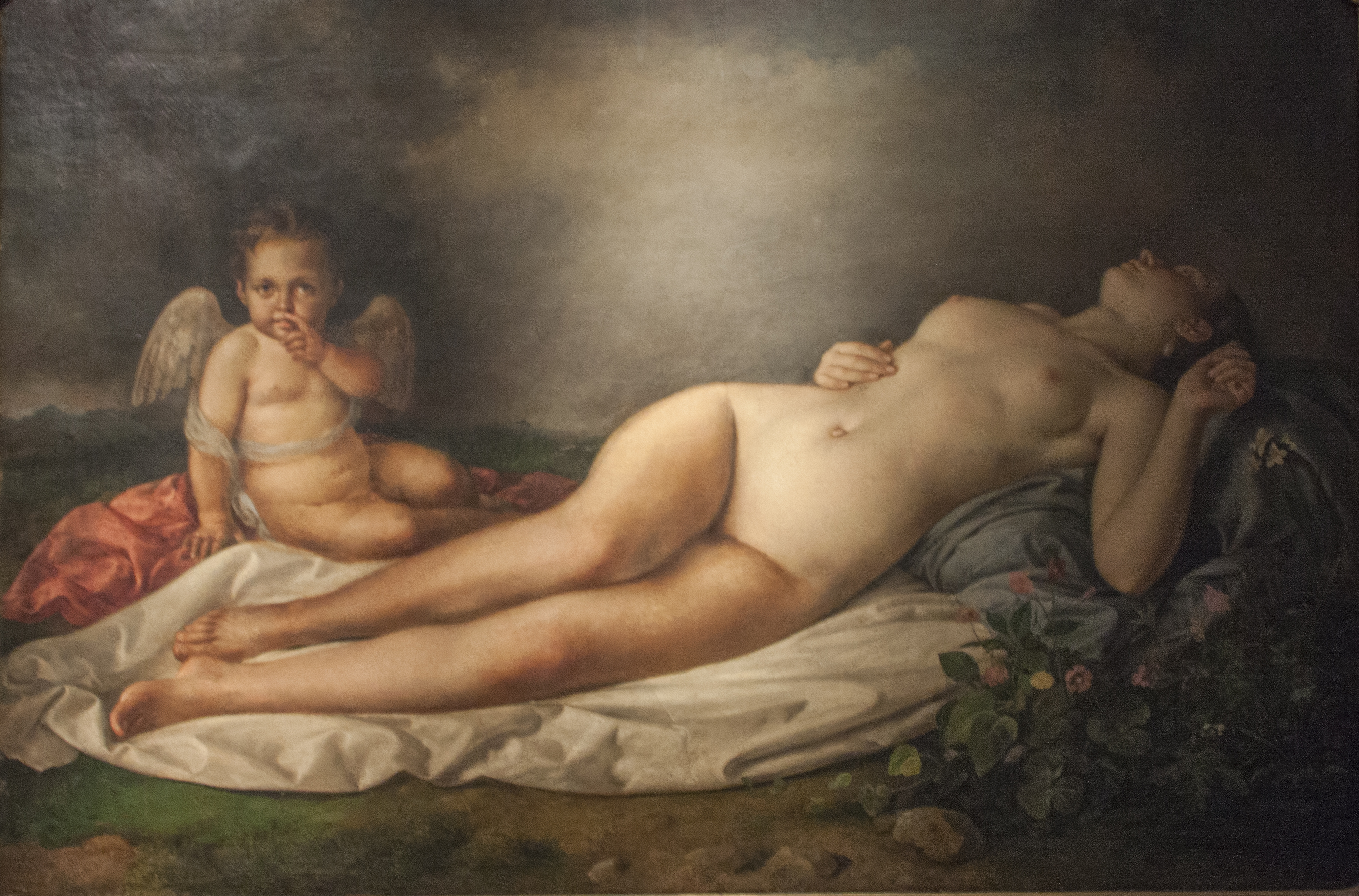
Sleeping Venus
