= Immacolata Concezione al Capo =

Church in Palermo, Italy

Church of the Immaculate Conception
- Chiesa dell'Immacolata Concezione al Capo (in Italian)
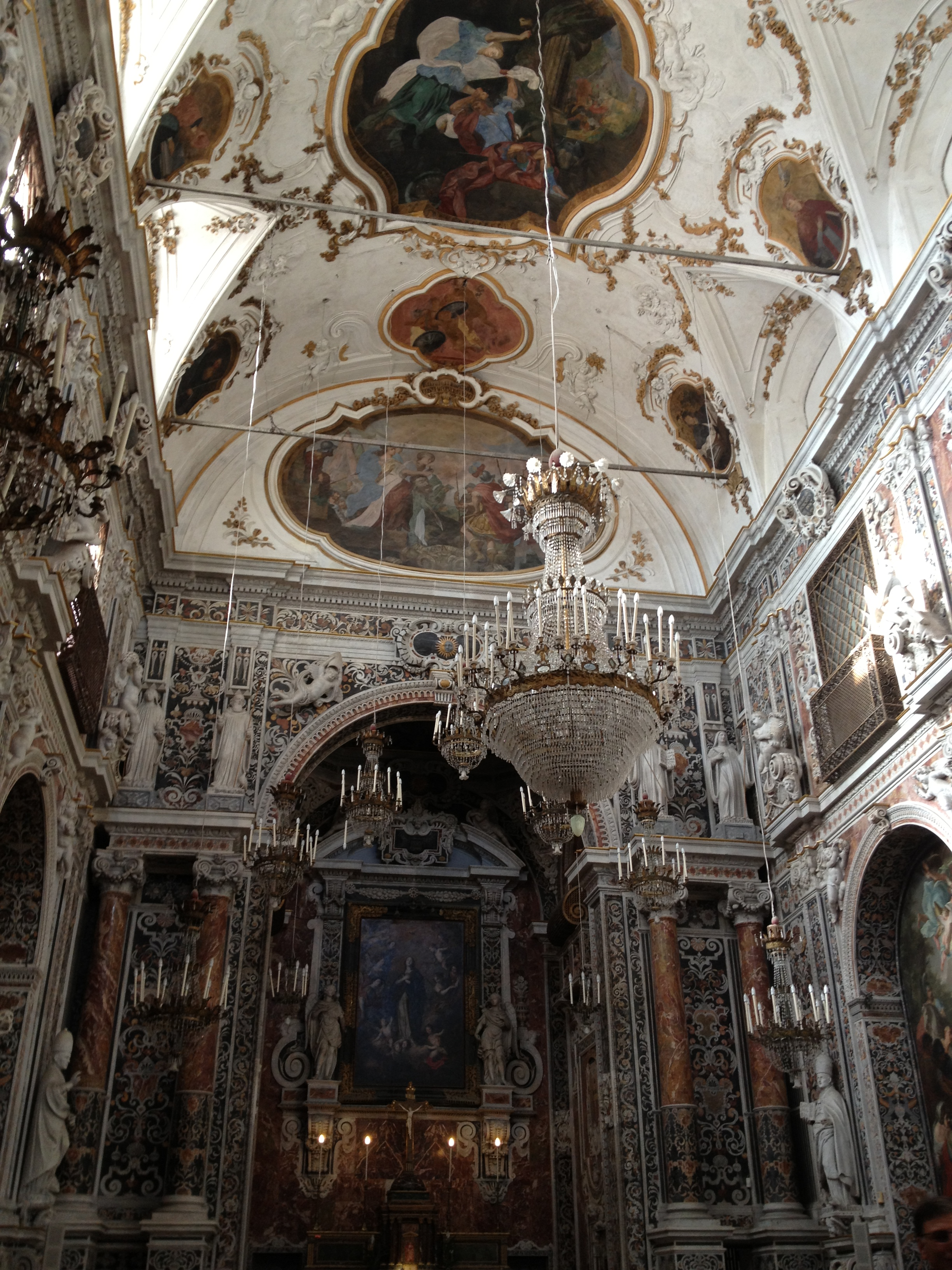
- Interior of the church

Religion
- Affiliation: Roman Catholic
- Province: Archdiocese of Palermo
- Rite: Roman Rite

Location
- Location: Palermo, Italy
- Interactive map of Church of the Immaculate Conception
- Coordinates: 38°07′06.84″N 13°21′51.41″E

Architecture
- Architect: Antonio Muttone
- Style: Sicilian Baroque
- Groundbreaking: 1604
- Completed: 1740

The Church of the Immaculate Conception (Italian: Chiesa dell'Immacolata Concezione or Immacolata Concezione al Capo) is a Baroque church of Palermo. It is located on the busy streets composing the markets of the Capo, in the quarter of the Seralcadio, within the historic centre of Palermo.

This monastic church is on via Porta Carini, across the street from the parish church of Sant'Ippolito.

It was built starting in 1612, from designs by Orazio Nobili.

It is finely decorated with many works of Sicilian artists like Giacomo Amato, Pietro Novelli, Olivio Sòzzi, Giuseppe Velasco and Carlo D'Aprile.

== Gallery ==
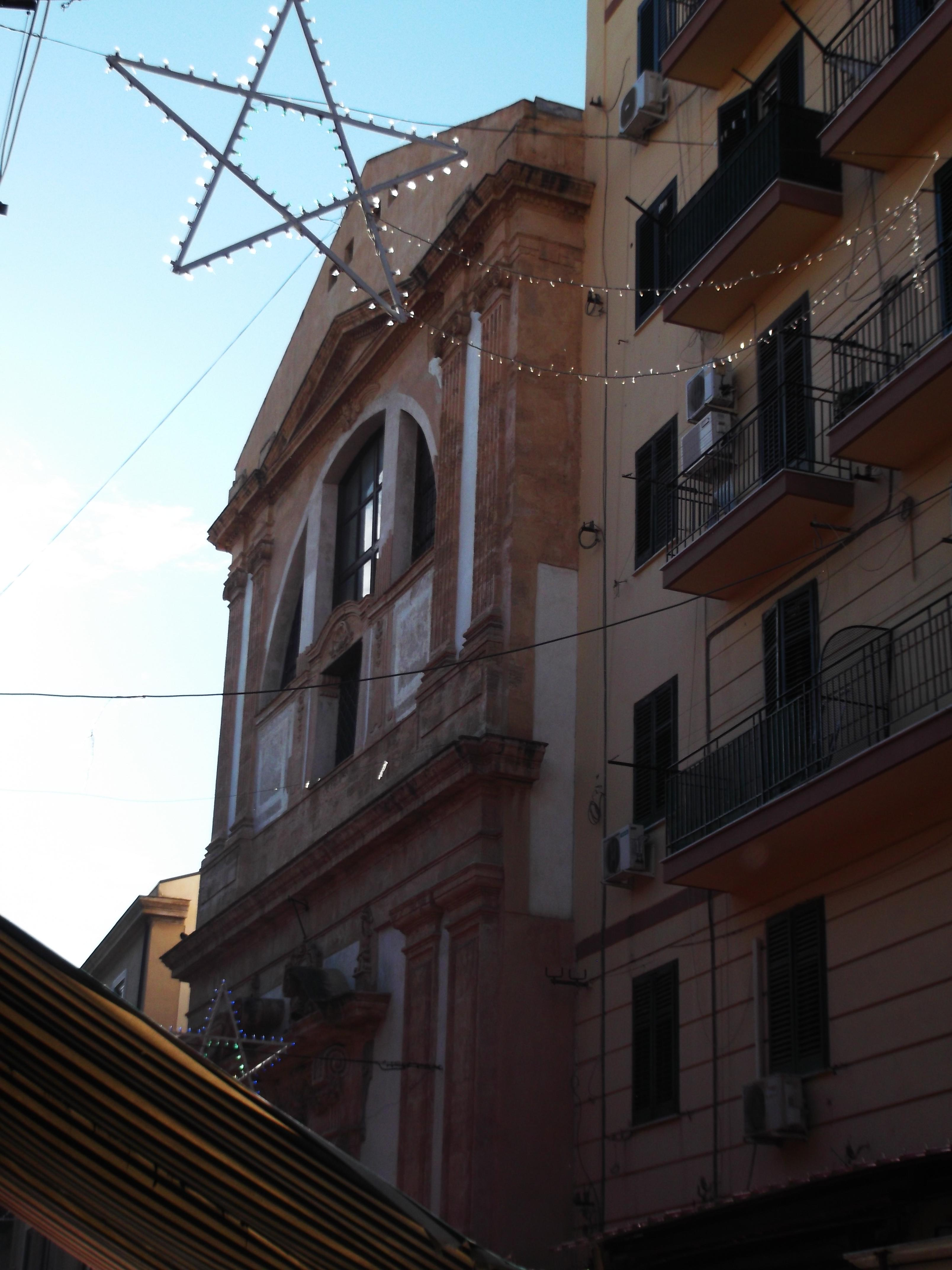
Facade of the church

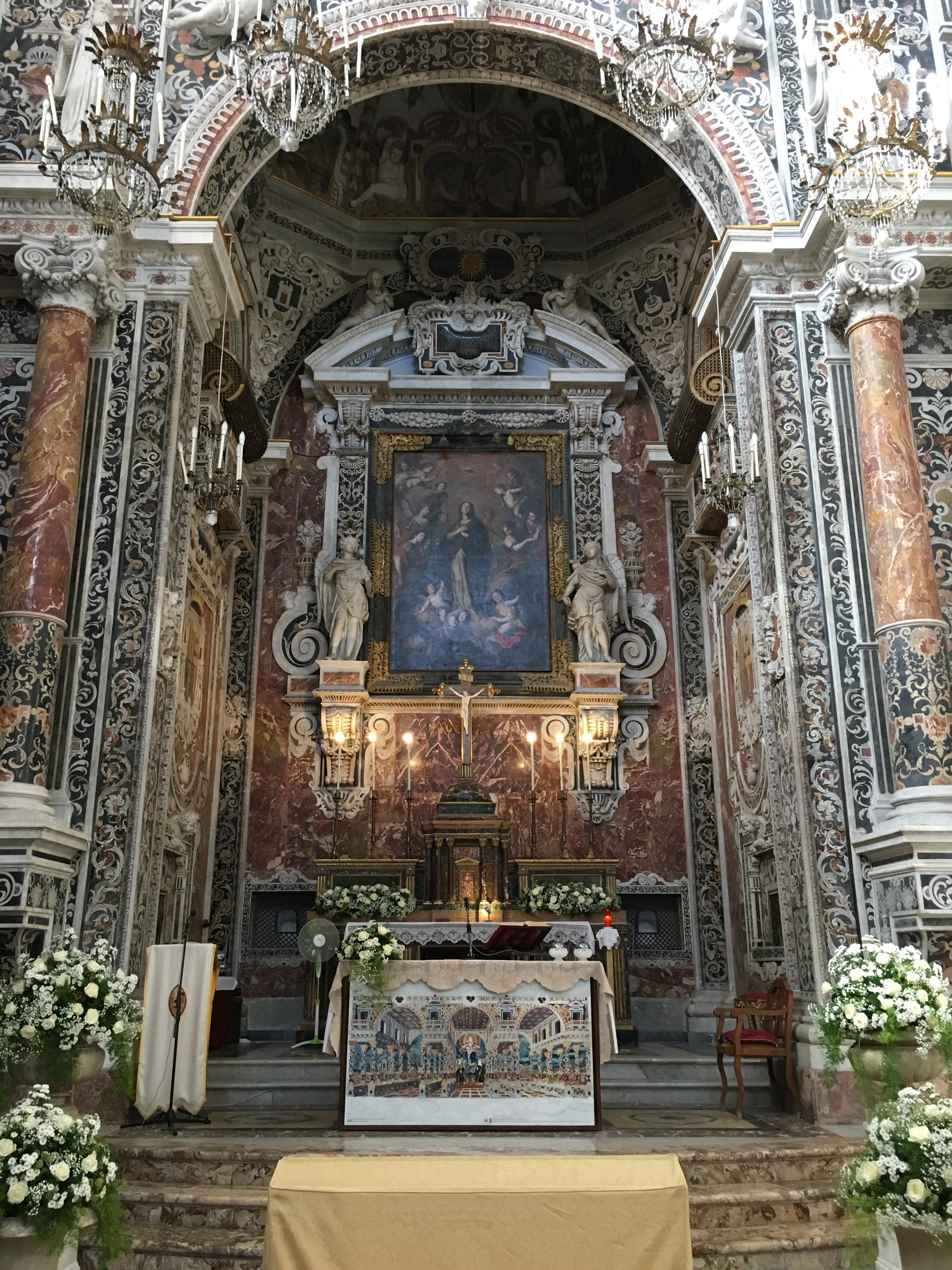
Main altar with the painting of Pietro Novelli depicting the Immaculate

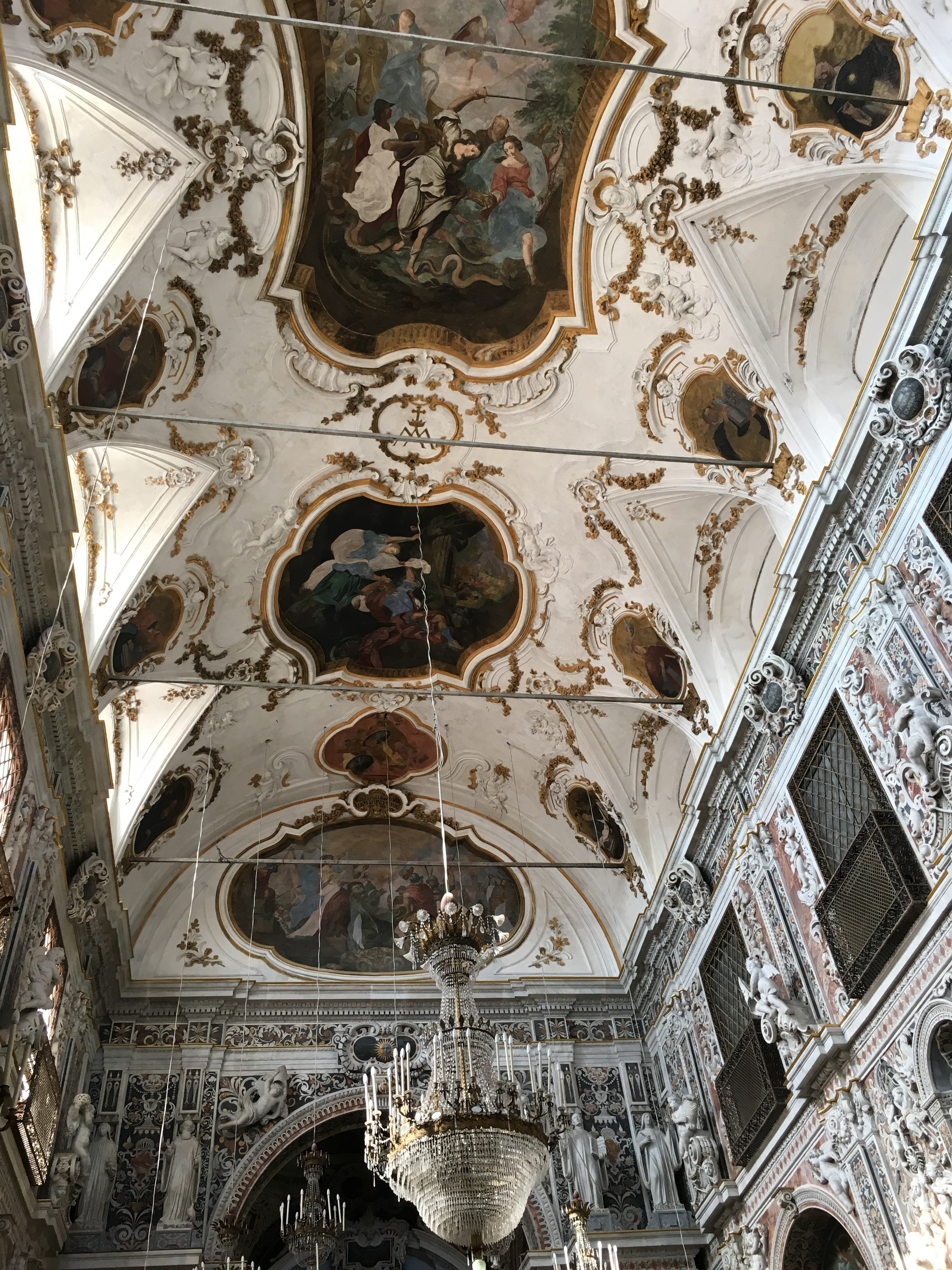
Vault frescoed by Olivio Sòzzi

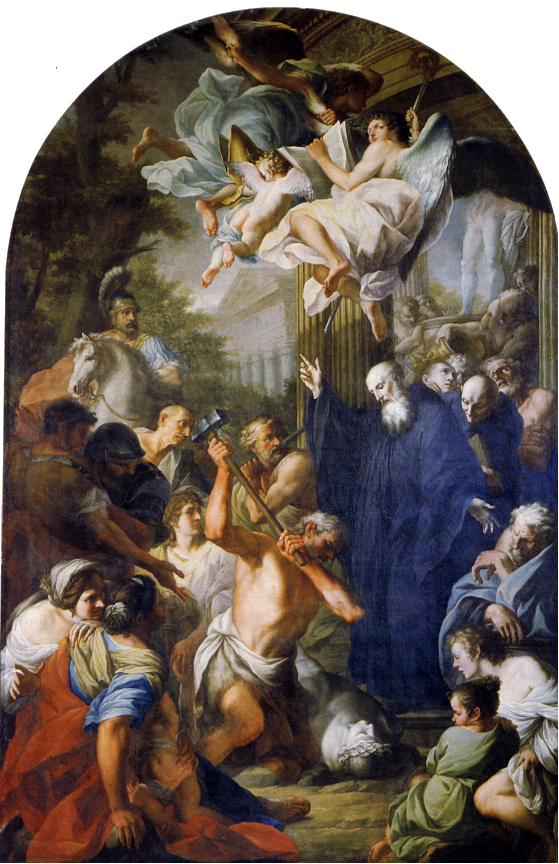
St Benedict of Norcia orders the destruction of the Pagan Idols (1777), altarpiece by Giuseppe Velasco
