= Giuseppe Patania =

Italian painter (1780–1852)

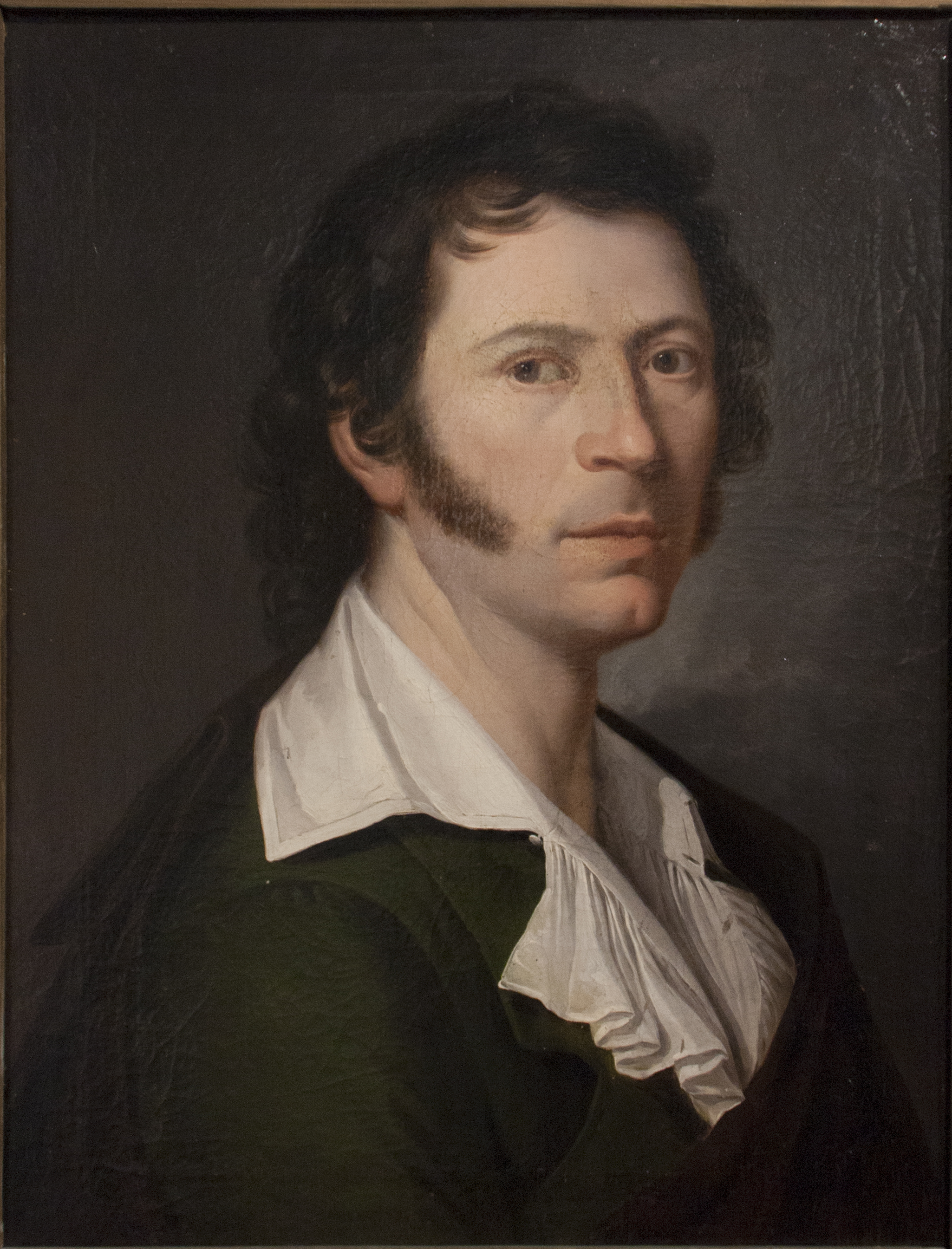
- Self-portrait on display at Galleria d'Arte Moderna Palermo
- Born: 18 January 1780; Palermo, Kingdom of Sicily
- Died: 23 February 1852 (aged 72); Palermo, Italy
- Known for: Painter
- Movement: Neoclassicism

Giuseppe Patania (January 18, 1780 – February 23, 1852) was an Italian painter of the Neoclassical period. He painted portraits and historical subjects.

== Biography ==
He was born in Palermo, Sicily. He studied with Giuseppe Velasco and Vincenzo Riolo. He is buried in San Domenico in Palermo, where his tomb states Selected the beautiful from Nature. Among his pupils were Pietro Marchese di Castrogiovanni, Giuseppe Bagnasco, Francesco Sacco, Giuseppe Carta, Andrea D'Antoni and Pietro Volpes.

In his biography of Andrea D'Antoni, the author Carmelo Pardi surveyed the art of the early prior century in Palermo, and observed that it was dominated by Velasco (Velasques), Riolo, and Patania. While all three gained local eminence, none had all the required skills to form a true school of followers: Velasques, master of design but poor colorist; Riolo, while Michelagelesque in his grand paintings, restricted himself to academic subjects and molded many of his images in imitation of classic statuary; while Patania, full of natural instincts, completed genre works with delicate grace, but failed in large compositions depicting great and severe arguments. Thus to summarize:

in Velasques, the perfection of design surpassed the color; in Riolo the conventionality of the form prevailed over the study of the true, and in Patania natural spontaneity took precedence over the knowledge of the principles that inform art.

== Gallery ==
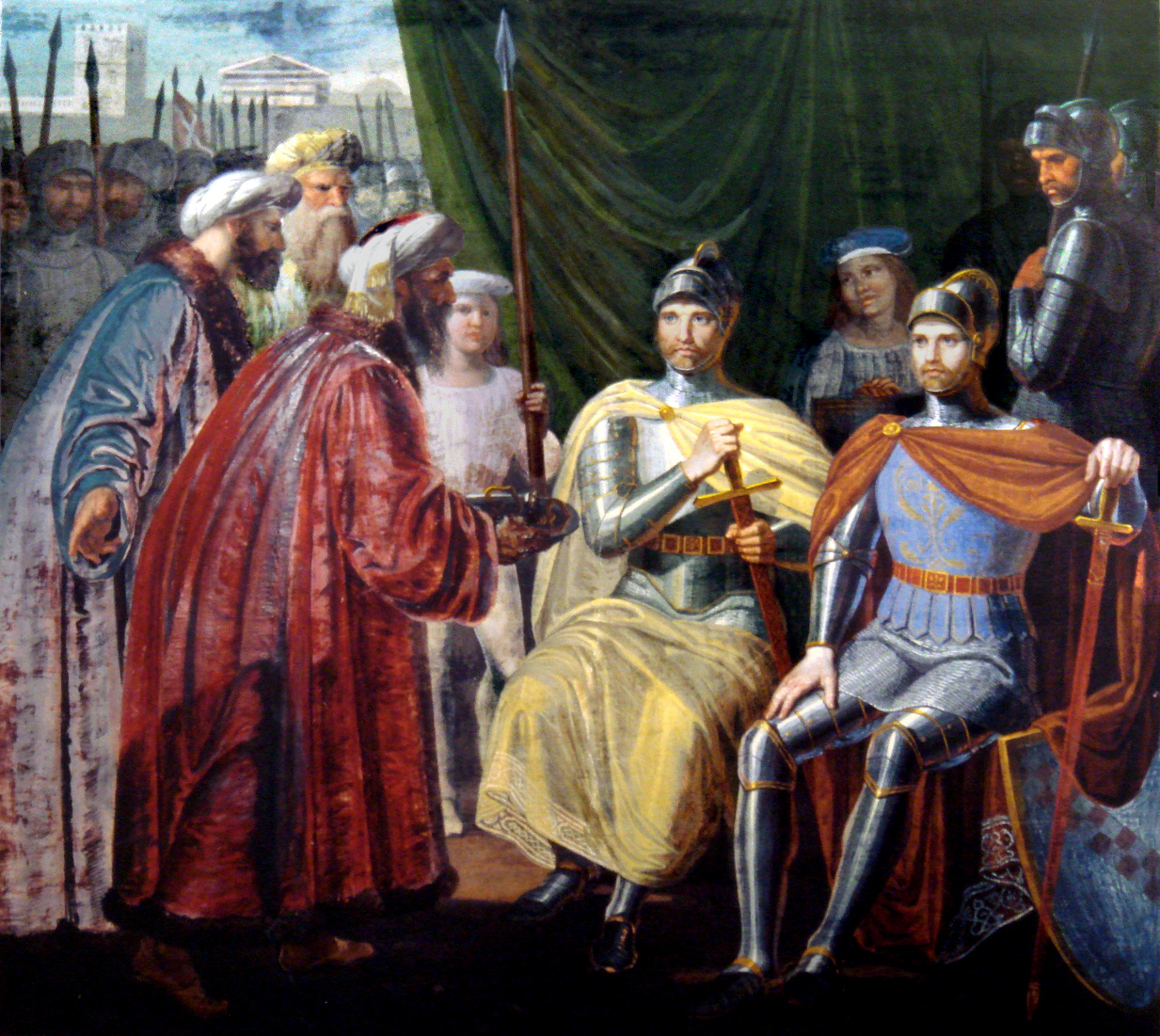
Roger of Sicily Receiving the Keys of Palermo

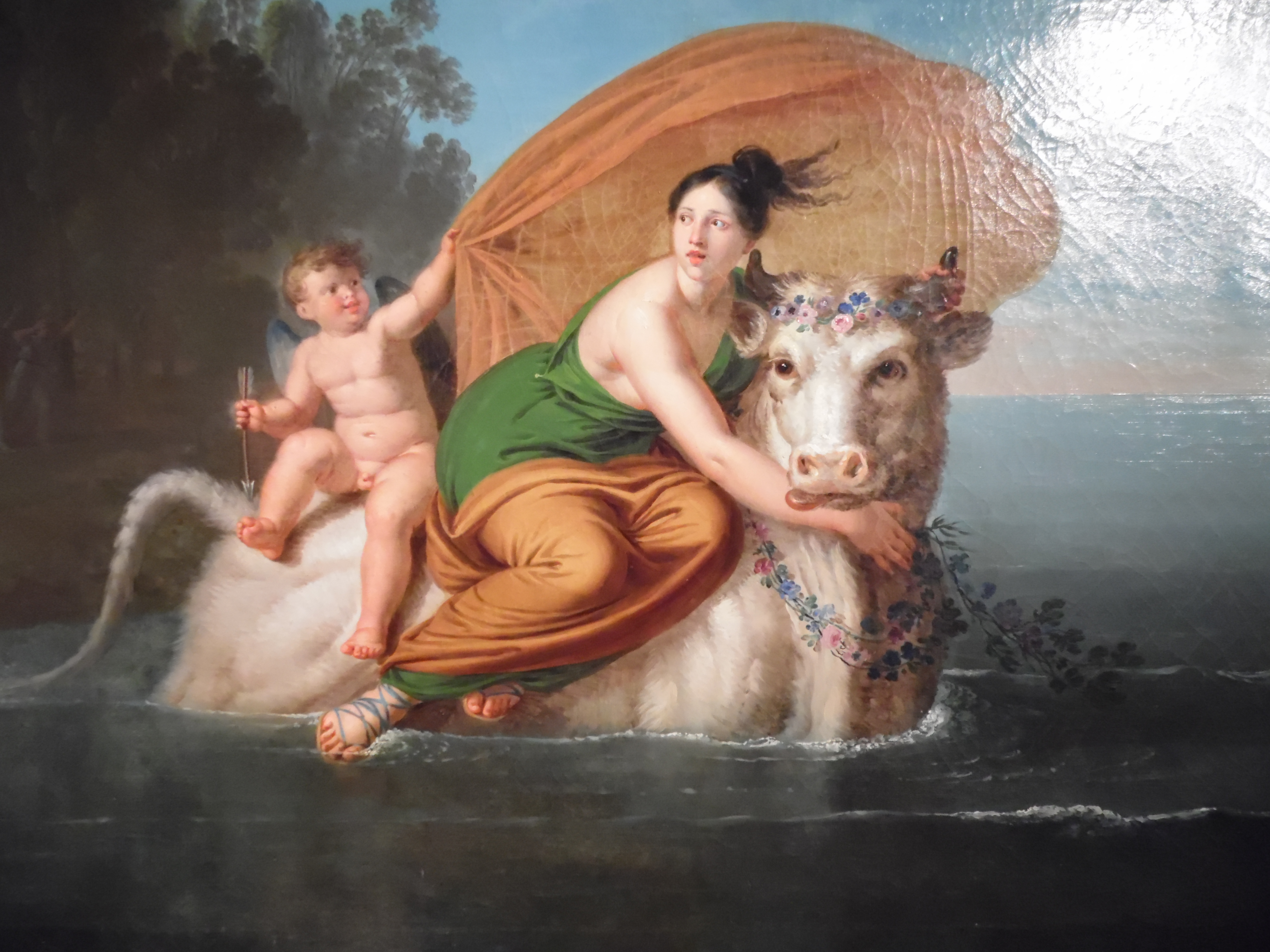
Ratto d'Europa (1828-1829). Galleria d’Arte Moderna (Palermo)
