= Giuseppe Velasquez =

Italian painter (1750–1827)

Giuseppe Velasco
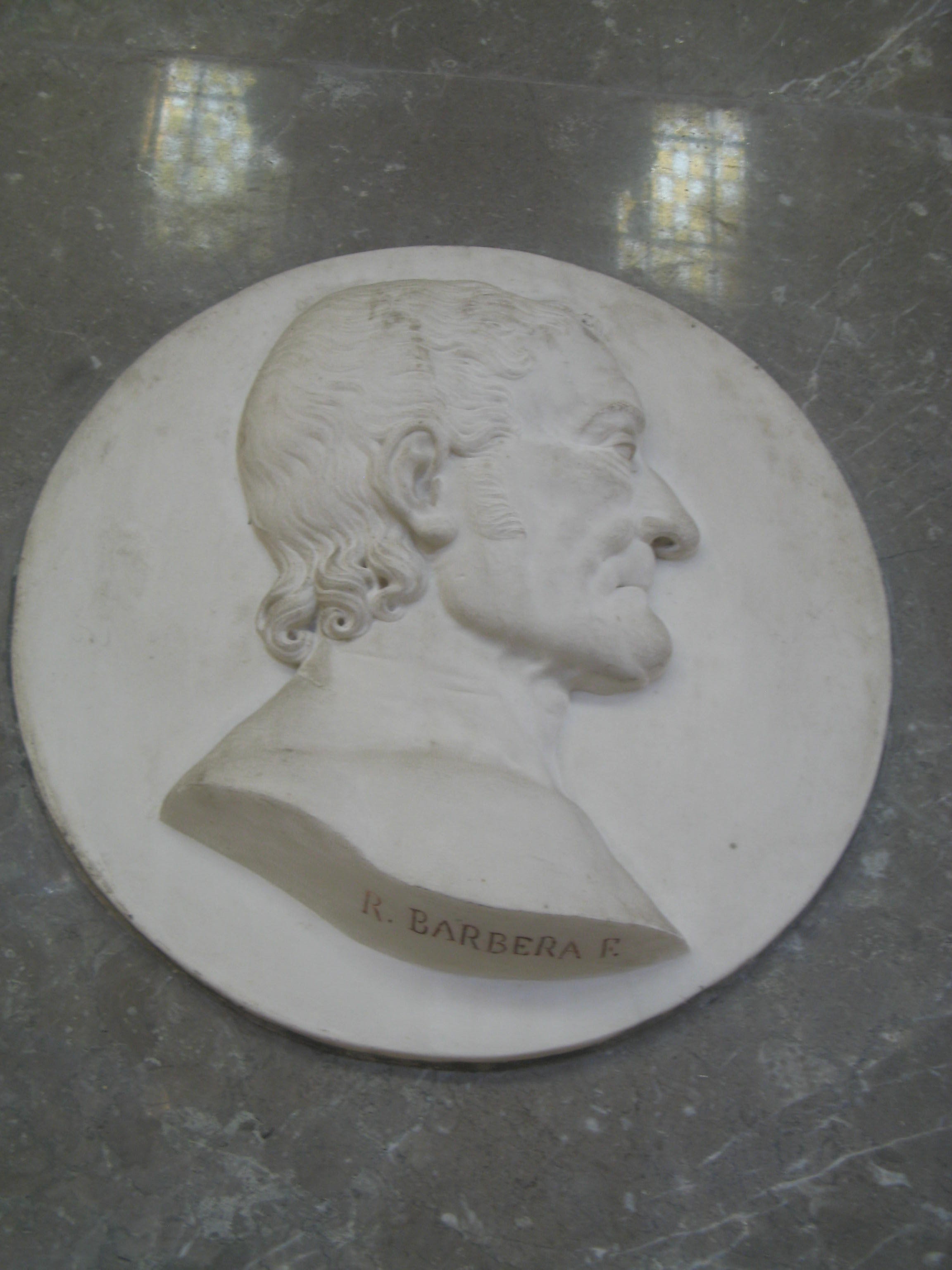
- Relief portrait of Velazquez in the church of San Domenico, Palermo
- Born: 16 December 1750; Palermo, Italy
- Died: 7 February 1827 (aged 76); Palermo, Italy
- Known for: Painter
- Movement: Neoclassicism

Giuseppe Velasquez, Velasques or Velasco (16 December 1750 – 7 February 1827) was an Italian painter, active in a Neoclassic style.

== Biography ==
He was born at Palermo into Spanish family; his father was Fabiano Ungo de Velasco. At the age of 15, he changed his surname to that of the Spanish painter Diego Velázquez.

He studied painting initially under a former pupil of Sebastiano Conca, Gaetano Mercurio, who fared poorly as a painter. He moved to work under another local follower of Conca, Giuseppe Tresca, with whom he painted frescoes in a church in Castellamare. Returning to Palermo, he finally worked under the painter Gioacchino Martorana, who had trained in Rome under Marco Benefial.

Velazquez often collaborated in providing the decoration for the structures built by the architect Giuseppe Venanzio Marvuglia. He was patronized by the viceroy Caramanico, for whom he painted his portrait. In 1805 he became Director of the Accademia del Nudo in at the University of Palermo, supplanting the painter Mariano Rossi. Among his pupils were Francesco la Farina (1778 - 1837). and Salvatore Lo Forte.

In 1869, the writer Carmelo Pardi compared the three prominent painters of Palermo of the early 19th century: Giuseppe Patania, Vincenzo Riolo, and Velasquez; Pardi noted that;

in Velasquez, the perfection of design surpassed the color; in Riolo the conventionality of the form prevailed to the study of the true, and in the Patania the natural spontaneity took precedence to the knowledge of the principles that inform art.

Velazquez died at Palermo and was buried in the Chiesa dei Cappuccini of Palermo.

== Works ==
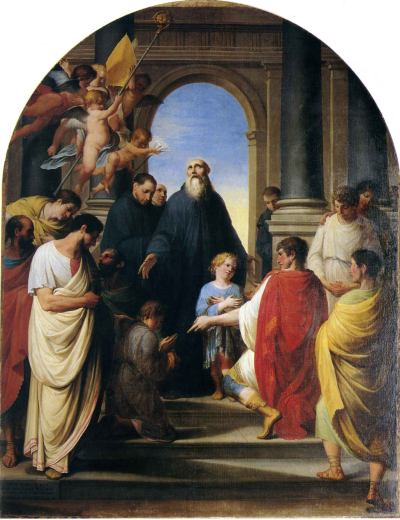
St. Benedict Welcomes His Disciples Maurus and Placidus at the Santissimo Salvatore, Noto

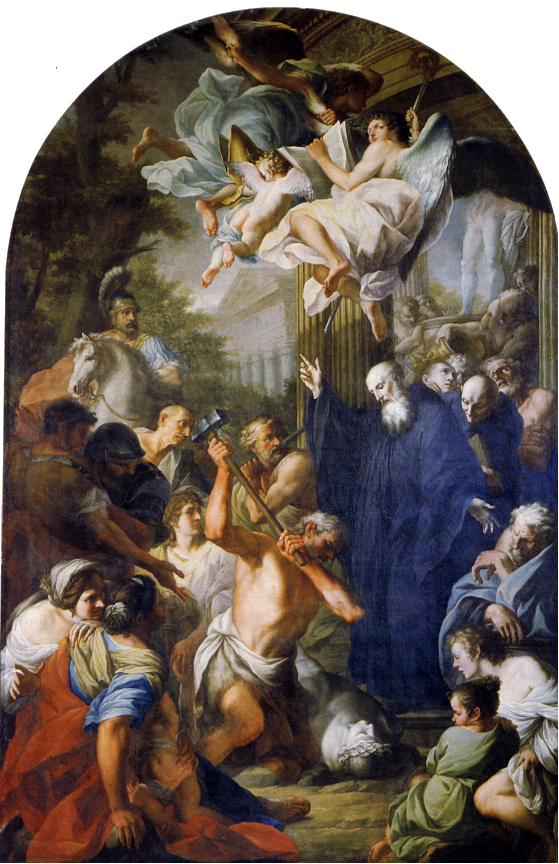
St Benedict destroys the Pagan Idols at the Church of the Concezione

Among his works:

- St Benedict destroys the Pagan Idols (1775) for the church of Immacolata Concezione al Capo, then attached to a Benedictine monastery in Palermo.
- Ecstasy of Santa Scolastica, and Presentation at the Temple (1772 ed il 1775) for the church of San Biagio, Nicosia.
- Miracle of St Vincent Ferrer (1787) for the church of San Domenico, Palermo.
- Story of Moses and Story of St Anthony of Padua for the church of San Antonino di Padova.
- Battle of Constantinople for Palazzo Costantino, Palermo
- Life of St Paul for the church of St Paul in Malta.
- Santa Rosalia (oval for ceiling) of Cathedral of Palermo.
- Frescoes (1792-1796), for Reale Orto Botanico of Palermo.
- Saint Peter, Matthew, Paul, and Andrea (frescoes, 1798) for the church of San Matteo
- Labors and Apotheosis of Hercules (frescoes, 1799) for salone di Ercole in the Palazzo dei Normanni in Palermo.
- Dream of William II the Good (Canvas, 1799) for the Benedictine convent in Monreale.
- Assumption of the Virgin Mary (1801) for Cathedral of Palermo.
- Monochromatic frescoes of Santa Chiara for church of Santa Maria degli Agonizzanti.
- Coronation of St Cristina by Christ (Canvas, 1803), for Cathedral of Palermo.
- Psyche conducted by Mercury to Olympus and Story of Psyche and Amore (frescoes) for Palazzo Ganci.
- Mythologic frescoes (1805) for Palazzina Cinese.
- Saints Benedict, Placido, and Mauro and Adoration by the Magi (canvases, 1808) for the church of San Salvatore di Noto.
- Granting keys to St Peter in the Mother church of Castelbuono.
- Annunciation, Assumption, Coronation of the Virgin (1809),Martyrdom of St Andrea, Martyrdom of Saints Phillip and James, Holy Family, (canvases, 1812–1816) for the church of Santa Maria Assunta, Randazzo.
- Portraits of Giuseppe Ventimiglia, Monsignor Ciafaglione, Ferdinand of Bourbon, Marabitti, and Marchese Airoldi.
