= Gioacchino Di Marzo =

Italian bibliographer

- Born: 2 December 1839; Palermo
- Died: 4 April 1916; Palermo
- Resting place: San Domenico, Palermo
- Occupations: Bibliographer, historian, Catholic priest, art historian

Gioacchino Di Marzo (2 December 1839 – 4 April 1916) was an Italian art historian, librarian and Jesuit. He was librarian to the Comunale di Palermo as well as a historiographer and one of the founders of modern Sicilian art history.

== Life ==
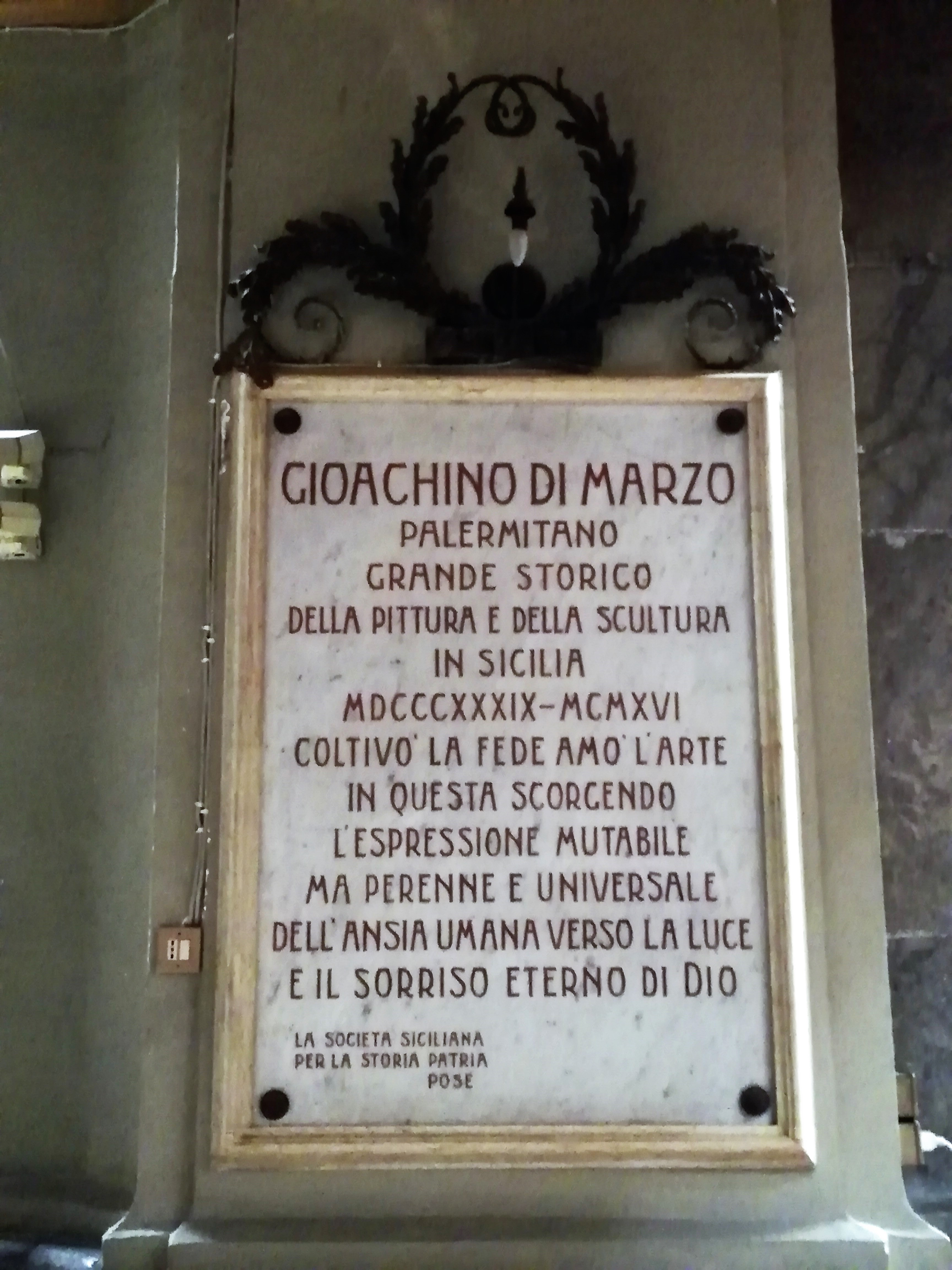
Commemorative plaque in San Domenico church in Palermo

Born in Palermo, he was ordained a priest in 1851. He was also Apostolic Protonotary, 'Ciantro' and 'Cappellano Maggiore' to the Cappella Palatina in Palermo. He translated Vito Amico's Lexicon topographicum in 1855, also writing a commentary to it. From 1858 to 1864 he published his four volume Delle Belle Arti in Sicilia dai Normanni alla fine del sec. XVI in Palermo. He died in Palermo in 1916, the same year as Giuseppe Pitrè and Salvatore Salomone Marino, two other major Sicilian cultural figures.

== Works ==
- Dizionario topografico della Sicilia, by Vito Amico; translated from the Latin and annotated by Gioacchino Di Marzo, Palermo, Tipografia di Pietro Morvillo, 1855–1856, 2 voll. vol.I, 1855; on line vol.I, 1858, II ed.
- Di un codice in volgare della storia di Troia di anonimo siciliano del secolo XIV, esistente nella Comunale di Palermo: saggio d'illustrazione, Palermo, stabilimento tipografico di Francesco Lao, 1863.
- Delle origini e vicende di Palermo, di Pietro Ranzano, e dell'entrata di re Alfonso in Napoli: scritture siciliane del secolo XV, pubblicate e illustrate su' codici della Comunale di Palermo, Palermo, Stamp. di G. Lorsnaider, 1864. Online edition
- Delle belle arti in Sicilia, Palermo, S. Di Marzo, 1858–1864, 3 voll. on line volume 1; on line volume 2; on line volume 3;on line volume 4
- Memorie storiche di Antonello Gagini e dei suoi figli e nipoti, scultori siciliani del secolo XVI, in «Archivio Storico Italiano», Palermo, III Serie, VIII, 1868, 2, pp. 39–109.
- Storia della rivoluzione di Sicilia nel 1820: tratta da documenti autentici, molti dei quali non più stampati, e preceduta da un discorso preliminare sulla rivoluzione del 1812 e sullo stato della Sicilia fino al 1820, scritta da Pietro Provenzano, con l'aggiunta di altre inedite scritture, Palermo, Uff. tip. P. Pensante, 1869.
- Biblioteca storica e letteraria di Sicilia, per cura di G. Di Marzo, Palermo, L. Pedone Lauriel, 1869–1886, 28 voll. Online edition: vol.III, 1869; vol.IV, 1869; vol. VIII, 1871; vol IX, 1871; vol. XI, 1873
- I manoscritti della Biblioteca comunale di Palermo, indicati e descritti dal can. Gaspare Rossi, [poi] indicati e descritti dall'ab. G. Di Marzo, Palermo, Stab. tip. Lao [poi Stab. tip. Virzì; Arti grafiche E. Castiglia], 1873–1934, 3 voll.
- Primo centenario della Biblioteca comunale di Palermo: addì 25 aprile 1875. Relazione, poesie, iscrizioni, Palermo, Tip. del Giornale di Sicilia, 1875.
- Storia di Sicilia, di Gio. Battista Caruso, pubblicata con la continuazione fino al presente secolo per cura di G. Di Marzo, Palermo, Stab. tip. Lao, 1875–1877.
- Drammatiche rappresentazioni in Sicilia e poesie di autori siciliani dal secolo XVI al XVIII, Palermo, L. Pedone Lauriel, 1876.
- I Gagini e la scultura in Sicilia nei secoli XV e XVI: memorie storiche e documenti, Palermo, Tip. del Giornale di Sicilia, 1880–1883. vol.I 1880 (ma 1882); vol.II 1883.
- La pittura in Palermo nel Rinascimento. Storia e Documenti , Palermo, Alberto Reber, 1899.
- Nuovi studi ed appunti su Antonello da Messina: con 25 documenti, Messina, Libreria editrice Ant. Trimarchi, 1905.
- Guglielmo Borremans di Anversa Pittore fiammingo in Sicilia, Palermo 1912.
- Vincenzo da Pavia detto il Romano, pittore in Palermo nel Cinquecento: studi e documenti, Palermo, Scuola tip. Boccone del povero, 1916.

== Bibliography (in Italian) ==
- F. Pottino, Onoranze a mons. Gioacchino Di Marzo nel suo 80° giubileo sacerdotale, December MCMXIII, Palermo 1914.
- F. Pottino. Monsignor Gioacchino Di Marzo. «Archivio storico siciliano», n.s., 41 (1916), p. 273-282.
- Vercellone, Guido Fagioli (1991). "DI MARZO, Gioacchino". Dizionario Biografico degli Italiani (in Italian). Vol. 40: Di Fausto–Donadoni. Rome: Institute of the Italian Encyclopaedia. ISBN 978-88-12-00032-6.
- Gioacchino Di Marzo e la critica d'arte nell'Ottocento in Italia, atti del Convegno, a cura di Simonetta La Barbera, 2004.

== External links (in Italian) ==
- "Biografia dell'A.I.B."
- "Convegno "Gioacchino Di Marzo e la nascita della Critica d'arte in Sicilia nell'Ottocento", Palermo, 15-17 aprile 2003".
- "Biblioteca Comunale di Palermo". Archived from the original on 2017-03-12.
