= Sulfur mining in Sicily =

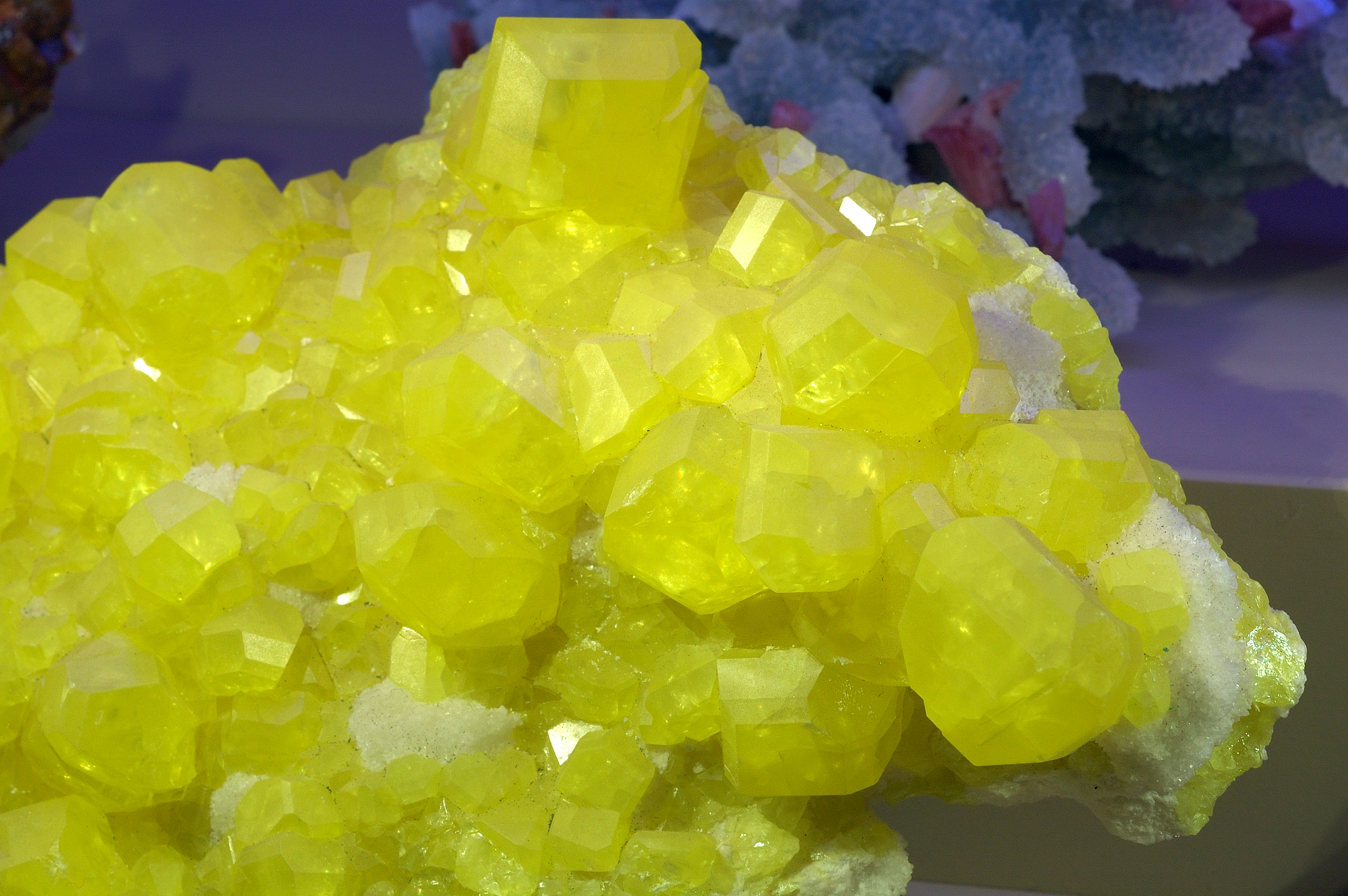
Sulfur crystals of the Agrigento area

Sulfur was one of Sicily's most important mineral resources, which is no longer exploited. The area covered by the large deposits is the central area of the island and lies between the provinces of Caltanissetta, Enna and Agrigento. The area is also known to geologists as the chalky-sulfur plateau. The area of mining exploitation also extended as far as the Province of Palermo with the Lercara Friddi basin and the Province of Catania. A part of the latter was used in the creation of the Province of Enna in 1928; it is the one in which sulfur mining, processing and transport took place in the last quarter of the millennium. For a time it also was the largest production area worldwide.

== History ==
The harvesting of outcrop sulfur took place even in very ancient times. In fact, mining vestiges have been found dating back to 200 B.C.E.; it was used in medicine from time immemorial but the Romans also used it for war purposes by mixing it with other fuels.

What set in motion the large-scale exploitation of Sicilian sulfur was the discovery of the Le Blanc method (1787) for the industrial-scale manufacture of soda ash. Sulfur, also a key ingredient in the production of gunpowder, then assumed a strategic importance equal to that held in the modern era by uranium. During the Napoleonic Wars, several British capitalists began to take an interest in the open-pit mining areas that were located near the ports of southern Sicily. After the peace and Conservative Order of 1815, various French companies also began their activities in the area due to the development of production and demand for sulfuric acid, which had a further propelling effect on Sicilian ore mining.

Following the Conservative Order, the sulfur industry finally took off, so much so that in the second half of the 1830s exports of sulfur were found to rank first among those from the island with an annual value of 1,671,500 ducats.

Between 1828 and 1830, the export of sulfur to the Marseille factories for the production of soda ash and sulfuric acid reached and exceeded 35,000 tons. Various contingent reasons, including overproduction, meant that from 1830 onward the sulfur industry had ups and downs with rather sustained price fluctuations also due to competition from pyrites mined and processed locally in Central Italy, whose transportation cost was lower. Attempts to establish sulfuric acid and soda ash production industries in Sicily were not very successful for various reasons; in 1838 Ferdinand II had granted the Sicilian sulfur monopoly to the French company Taix & Aycard, which promised the development of processing industries and the construction of 25 km of carriage roads per year in return. However, this choice did not lead to the desired results. As market prices rose excessively, the industrial initiatives were not followed up, and there was stiff opposition from Great Britain, which even threatened to seize Sicilian ships. In 1846 the agreements to that effect were revoked. The largest importer in 1849 was England, but sulfur was also sold in large quantities to the United States.

The development of methods for using cheaper pyrites instead of sulfur in the production of sulfuric acid along with the spread of the Solvay method of producing artificial soda ash were decisive in the gradual loss of market share, particularly in Germany and England, resulting in the collapse of Sicilian sulfur prices. Production continued until the end of the nineteenth century, but the collapse of selling prices put the entire industry in crisis.

In 1896, the Anglo-Sicilian Sulphur Company Limited was formed in London. Its members included Vincenzo Florio, who was its attorney for Sicily, and a group of interested investors including Englishmen Benjamin Ingham and Agostino Porry; the purpose was to revive the marketing of sulfuric acid and sulfur derivatives. Agreements made with the Anglo-Sicilian-Sulphur Co. allowed producers access to credit to finance more modern industrial plants by improving mine facilities. For a time the Sicilian sulfur sector was lifted from the crisis into which it had plunged; prices, which in 1895 had fallen to 56 liras per ton already a few years later, stabilized at 90–95 liras.

Also reviving the demand for sulfur was the serious spread of a plant disease, powdery mildew; a parasitic fungus of the vine affected vineyards throughout Europe, devastating them. The only remedy to prevent its spread was spraying plants with sulfur powder in an aqueous solution. Sulfur refining and milling then became profitable again with the establishment of refineries and milling plants in various coastal locations from Licata to Porto Empedocle and in the city of Catania.

One of the problems underlying the various crises in the industry was the infrastructural deficiency in transportation, lack of communication roads, lack of ports that would allow large cargo ships to dock, lack of mechanical means and railways, which the various governments had neglected and which the new Kingdom of Italy addressed with little determination. In the early 1870s, the mayor of Catania Tenerelli, a financier and entrepreneur in the sulfur industry, denounced the delay in proceeding with the construction of the Palermo-Catania railway as the main reason for the paralysis of the sulfur industry. In fact, it was only after the opening of the section up to Villarosa (1876), subcontracted by Robert Trewhella (also a large sulfur entrepreneur in the Catania area) that sulfur could reach the city's refineries and the Port of Catania quickly. This fact led the city to assume a preeminent role in the industry, because it lowered to almost half the unit price of transportation, which until that time had been accomplished by means of carramatti, a kind of cargo wagons pulled by sturdy draft horses.

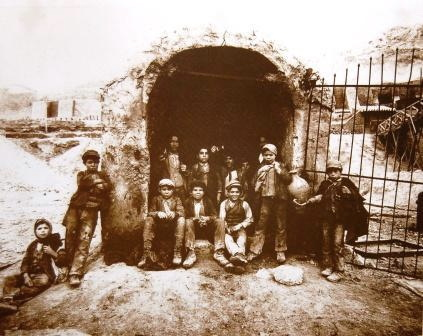
Boys at the entrance of a sulfur mine pit; 1899

By the end of the 19th century, there were more than 700 mines present and active, employing a workforce of more than 30,000, the working conditions of which, however, remained bordering on inhumane. The turn-of-the-century years thus saw the birth and development of the first trade unions and the beginning of strikes to obtain more humane working conditions. The sulfur workers were those who most participated in the establishment of the Fasci Siciliani (Sicilian Workers Leagues): in May 1891 the Fascio of Catania was established; in October 1893, the mining congress was held in Grotte, a mining town in the province of Agrigento. The congress was attended by 1,500 workers and small producers. The sulfur workers demanded legally raising the minimum age of mine boys exploited since then as slaves to 14, a decrease in working hours (which was practically from dawn to dusk) and a minimum wage. Small producers demanded measures that would free them from the exploitation of the few large owners who controlled the storage market while deriving all the profit. The Fasci, however, were disbanded on authority by the Francesco Crispi government in early 1894 after more than a hundred demonstrators had died in clashes with the army in a single year. The industry had entered a crisis in the 1890s, and the Anglo-Sicilian company had shifted trade to the Port of Licata and Porto Empedocle where costs were lower, causing serious repercussions on the Catanese economy.

In 1901, the work units reached a high of thirty-nine thousand with 540,000 tons of sulfur ore extracted.

The Anglo-Sicilian company continued to operate, but ceased operations as a result of the spread of the new economical mining method, the Frasch process, to the United States. It could not be applied to the mines of Sicily, which rendered them uncompetitive.

World War I increased the difficulties of supplying materials for the industry and decreased the number of miners as a result of most of the workforce joining the army. By the end of the war, the U.S. sulfur industry claimed much of the world market. In 1927, Fascism nationalized the mining subsoil by creating the Ente Nazionale Zolfi Italiani based in Rome, centralizing all mining, commercial and economic activities there, and nevertheless failing to revive the industry. Sicilian sulfur production regained some breath only after 1943, after the war was over (in Sicily), but only until the early 1950s as America engaged in the Korean War and channelled resources to the war industry.

The subsequent resumption of American industrial production again raked all markets, burning the competition with low prices, despite Italian protectionism at both the central and regional government levels (which in 1962 had created the Ente Minerario Siciliano for the purpose). The measures slowed the decline of the island's sulfur sector until the market liberalization sought by the European single market brought it to an end. In 1976, the island's sulfur production had not exceeded a total of 85,000 tons. Beginning in 1975, various laws produced the gradual closure of the Musala, Zimbalio, Gaspa La Torre, Baccarato, Giangagliano, Floristella, Grottacalda, and Giumentaro mines to name the largest; today none remain in operation.

== Sulfur mines ==
Below are some of the hundreds of sulfur mines divided among the provinces of central Sicily:

=== Province of Agrigento ===
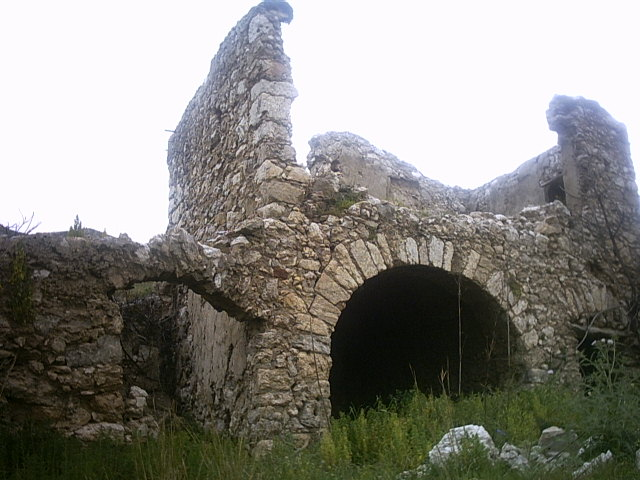
Entrance to an abandoned mine in Cianciana

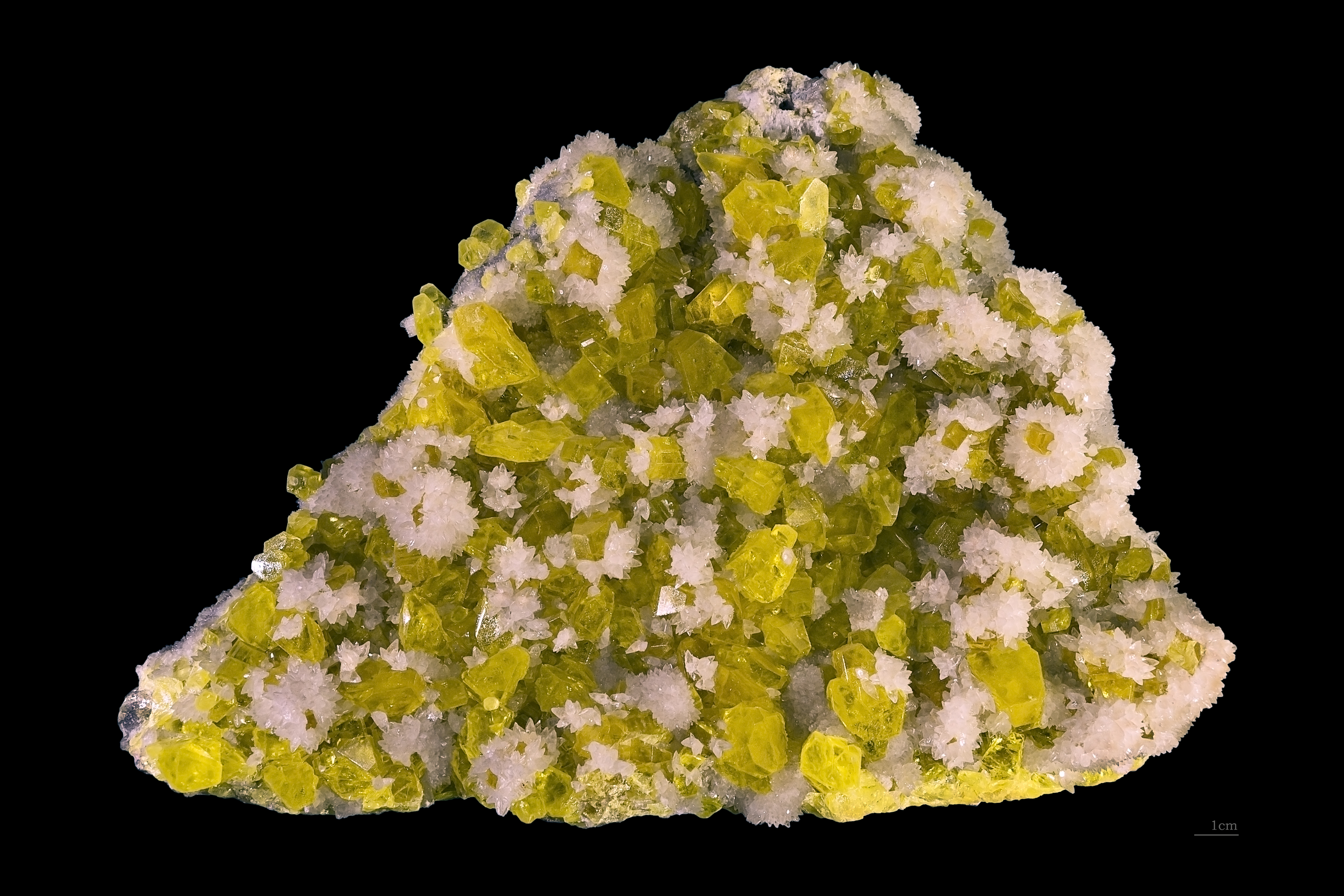
Crude sulfur ore from Agrigento

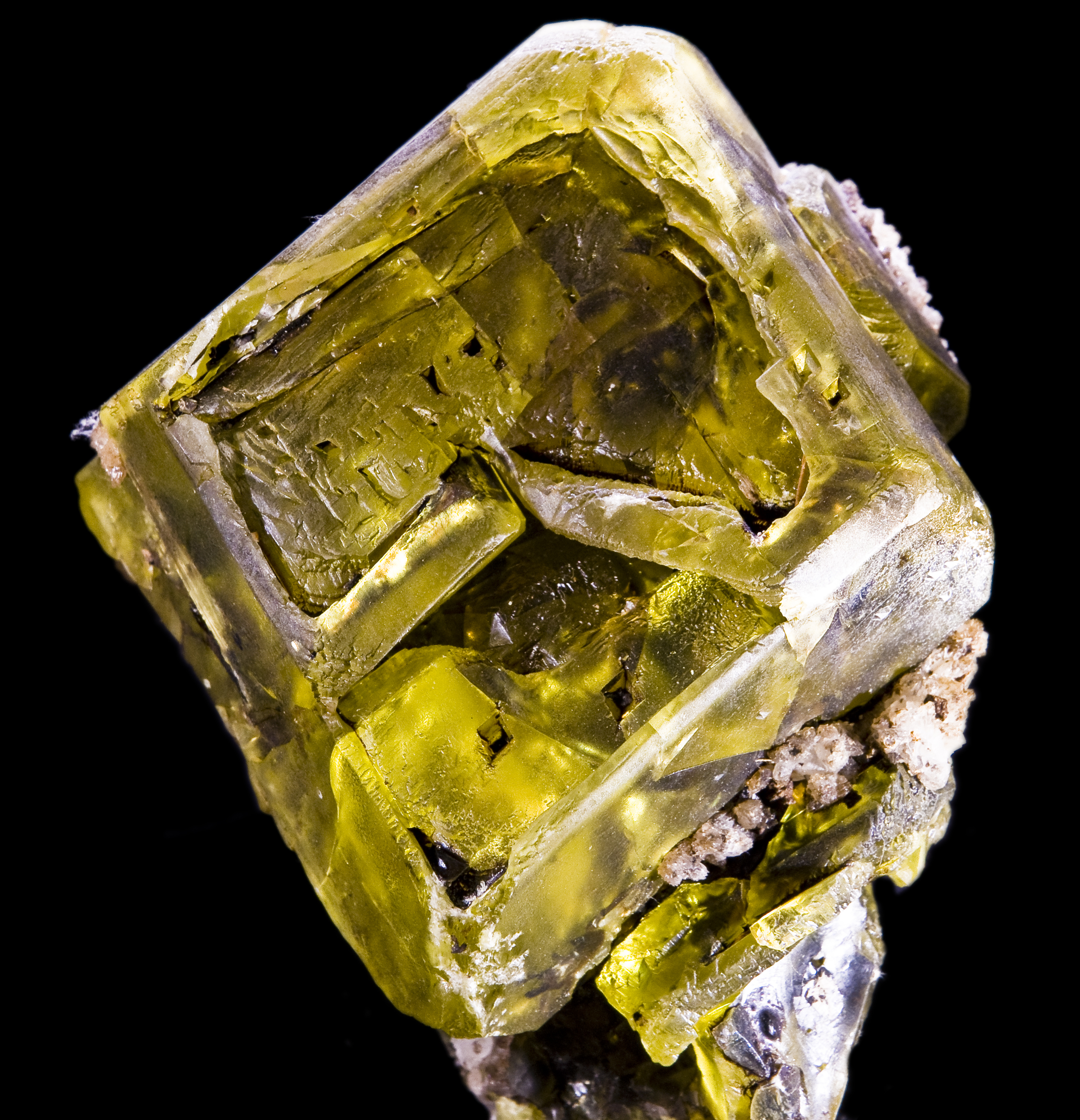
Sulfur mixed with bitumen, from the mines of Cozzo Disi, Casteltermini, in the province of Agrigento

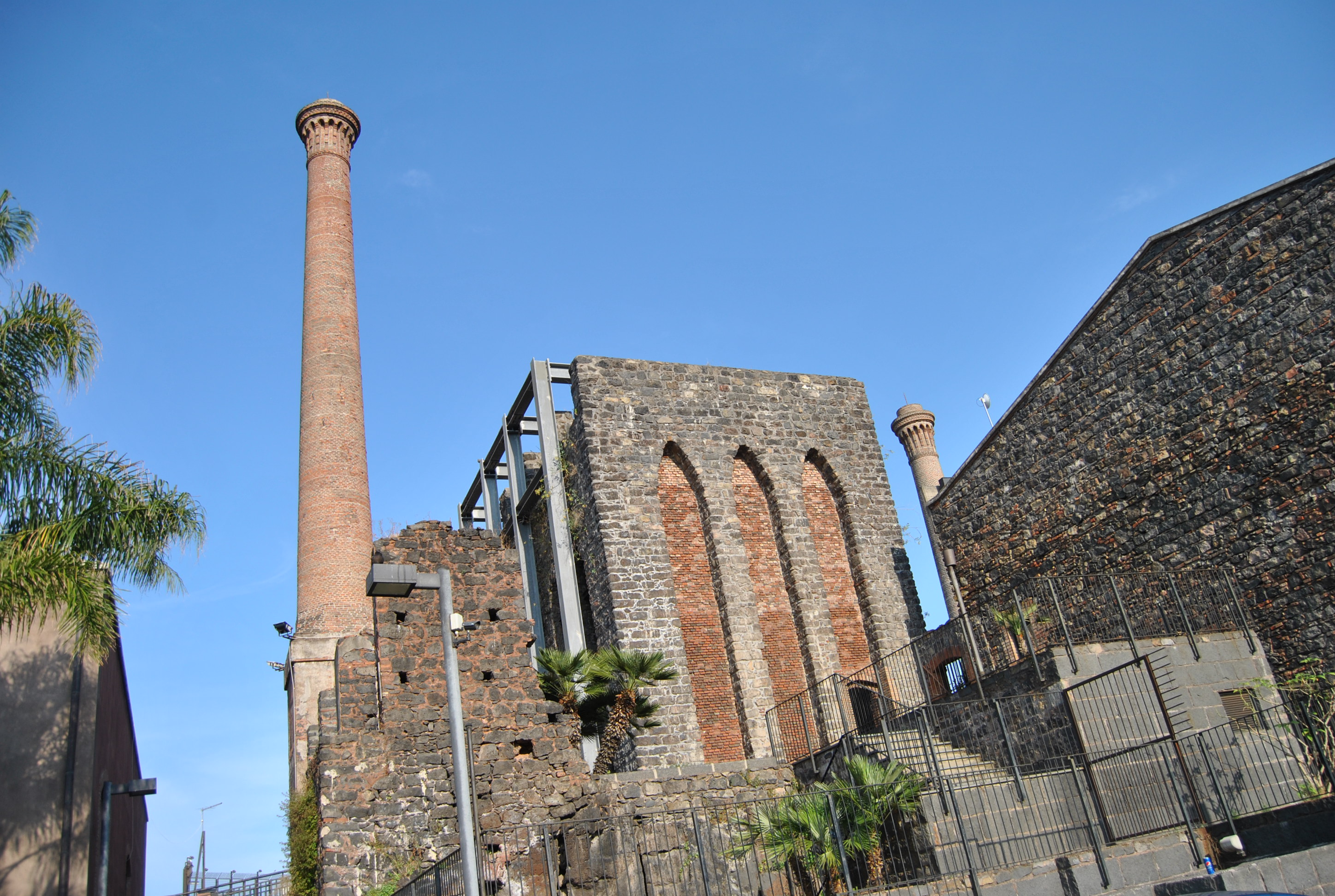
Last vestiges in Catania of the great sulfur-processing industrial apparatus: a smokestack and adjacent building, now home to the Le Ciminiere Exhibition Center.

- Milione, near Agrigento
- Cinié, in the vicinity of Alessandria della Rocca, in the locality of Cinié
- Mandra, near Aragona
- Balata, in the territory of Bivona, in the Balata locality
- Bifara (Campobello di Licata)
- Favarotta (Campobello di Licata)
- Giammaccarrone, near Campobello di Licata
- Serra di Mendola (Campobello di Licata)
- Verdilio-Mintina, near Campobello di Licata
- San Giovannello, near Casteltermini
- Scironello, near Casteltermini
- Viadimezzo, near Casteltermini
- Cozzo Disi, between Casteltermini and Campofranco, in Montelongo, which was active until 1992 and can now be visited as a mine-museum, an example of industrial archaeology.
- Collorotondo, near Cattolica Eraclea
- Malacarne, near Cattolica Eraclea
- Marco, near Cattolica Eraclea
- Margitello, near Cattolica Eraclea
- Cappadone, near Cianciana, in the Falconera locality
- Groticelli, northwest of Cianciana
- Grotticelli, northeast of Cianciana
- Guidi, near Cianciana, in the locality of Raddoli
- Falconera, northeast of Cianciana
- Mormino, in the vicinity of Cianciana, in Raddoli
- Passarello, northeast of Cianciana
- Sciacca Pass, northwest of Cianciana
- Polizzi, near Cianciana
- Tamburello, near Cianciana, in the locality of Raddoli
- Fiumarazza-Grassagliata, near Comitini
- Montagna, near Comitini
- Stretto Cuvello, near Comitini, closed in 1974
- Cucca, in Favara
- Falsirotta, near Favara
- Poggio di muto, in Favara
- Prilo, in Favara
- Roccarossa, in Favara
- Salamone, near Favara
- Ciavolotta, between the municipality of Favara and Villaggio Mosè, a hamlet of Agrigento
- Lucia, between the municipality of Favara and Villaggio Mosè, a hamlet of Agrigento
- Cinta di Joppolo Giancaxio, in the vicinity of Joppolo Giancaxio, at Cinta
- Vallone secco, near Licata
- Barriera, near Naro
- Ciccobriglio, near Naro
- Gambecorte, in the vicinity of Naro, in the locality of Perciata
- Gibbesi, in the vicinity of Naro, in the locality of Gibbesi
- Mintinella Virdilio near Naro
- Sciacca, in the vicinity of Naro, in the locality of Perciata
- Gibeldolce, near Palma di Montechiaro
- Montegrande, near Palma di Montechiaro
- Sciuvè, near Palma di Montechiaro
- Bonomo (Racalmuto Area)
- Donna Fara, near Racalmuto
- Frate Paolo (Racalmuto Area)
- Gibellini, between Racalmuto and Montedoro, in the province of Caltanissetta
- Grillo (Racalmuto Area)
- Piano di Corsa (Racalmuto Area)
- Piriò (Racalmuto Area)
- Quattro Finaite (Racalmuto Area)
- Quattro Tumoli (Area di Racalmuto)
- San Marco (Racalmuto Area)
- Scifitello (Racalmuto Area)
- Stagnone (Racalmuto Area)
- Villanova (Racalmuto Area)
- Arciprete, near Raffadali
- Guarnì, near Raffadali
- Travale, in the vicinity of Ravanusa, in Conte.
- Lamela, near Sant'Angelo Muxaro
- Mizzaro, near Sant'Angelo Muxaro
- Virzì, near Siculiana, in the locality of Virzì
- Gibellina Inglese e Savatteri
- Passarello – Licata, in the territory of Licata, Favarotta locality

=== Province of Caltanissetta ===
- Marcato Grande, near Acquaviva Platani
- Porcheria, near Acquaviva Platani
- Marchese, near Bompensiere, in the Marchese locality.
- Scimè, in the vicinity of Bompensiere, in the locality of Scimè
- Muculufa, near Butera, declared in 1988 a site of public interest
- Benuntende (Caltanissetta Area)
- Gessolungo, in the Caltanissetta area.
- Giumentaro, near Caltanissetta
- Iungio Tumminelli, in the Caltanissetta area.
- Saponara, in the Caltanissetta area.
- Serradigessi, near Caltanissetta
- Strait, in the Caltanissetta area.
- Trabonella, in the Caltanissetta area, connected by a narrow-gauge line to the nearby and then active Imera Station, which was specially opened in 1825
- Falzirotta Failla (Delia Area)
- Giffaro, near Delia, the only open pit sulfur mine
- The Grasta, north of Delia and Sommatino, closed in 1987
- Bubonia, near Mazzarino
- Rigiulfo, near Mazzarino
- Gallitano (Mazzarino)
- Pietrevive, near Montedoro
- Segreto del Sonno (Secret of Sleep), near Montedoro in the Gibellina locality.
- Stazzone, near Montedoro in the Stazzone locality
- Gibellini, between Montedoro and Racalmuto, in the province of Agrigento.
- Mandradipiano, near Mussomeli
- Bosco (Serradifalco Area)
- Baglivo
- Mendola
- Lanzirotti
- Gebbiarossa
- Grottarossa (San Cataldo)
- Pergola, near San Cataldo
- Stincone, near San Cataldo, in the Stincone district, active since the early 1700s
- Barrachella, near Sommatino
- Portella di pietra, between Sommatino and Riesi
- Trabia Tallarita, between Sommatino and Riesi
- Abate Figlia, near Sutera, in the locality of Cimicia, owned by the Benedictine Fathers of Palermo
- Conca d'Oro, near Sutera, in the locality of Cimicia, owned by the Benedictine Fathers of Palermo
- Cozzo a mezzo, near Sutera, in the locality of Cimicia, owned by the Benedictine Fathers of Palermo
- Cozzo tramonta, near Sutera, in the locality of Cimicia, owned by the Benedictine Fathers of Palermo
- Cozzo travala, near Sutera, in the locality of Cimicia, owned by the Benedictine Fathers of Palermo
- Giona, near Sutera
- Grotta Affumata, near Sutera, in the locality of Cimicia, owned by the Benedictine Fathers of Palermo
- Pietre bianche, near Sutera, in the locality of Cimicia, owned by the Benedictine Fathers of Palermo
- Tenuta, near Sutera, in the locality of Cimicia, owned by the Benedictine Fathers of Palermo
- Zorra di Martino, near Sutera, in the locality of Cimicia, owned by the Benedictine Fathers of Palermo
- Mendolilla

=== Province of Catania ===
- Balchino, near Caltagirone
- Scala, near Caltagirone
- Calasari, in the territory of Ramacca, Calasari locality

=== Province of Enna ===
- Cannamela, near Agira
- Garruba, near Agira
- Pozzo (sulfur mine group of Agira)
- Salicio, near Agira
- San Paolo, near Agira
- Sant'Agostino (in Agira)
- Baccarato, near Aidone
- Feudonovo, near Aidone
- Finocchio, near Aidone
- Bambinello (Assoro)
- Capobianco (Assoro)
- Donna Carlotta (Assoro)
- Morticello (Assoro)
- Ogliastrello (Assoro)
- Panche, near Assoro, sulfur mine group of Agira
- Pietramaggiore (Assoro)
- Piliere (Assoro)
- Rassuara (Assoro)
- Sparacio (Assoro)
- Vodi, near Assoro, active since the early 1700s
- Zimbalio and Giangagliano, near Assoro, first separated, then joined, closed in 1975
- Galati, near Barrafranca, active since the early 1700s
- San Giovanni, near Calascibetta
- Muglia, near Centuripe
- Marmora-Palmieri (Centuripe)
- Salina (Centuripe)
- Caliato (Enna)
- Cannarella (Enna)
- Capodarso (Enna)
- Giumentaro (Enna)
- Pagliarelo-Respica (Enna)
- Pasquasia, near Enna (salt mine)
- Salinella (Enna)
- Salvatorello (Enna)
- Tower, later Severino, near Enna, active since the early 1700s
- Faccialavata (Leonforte)
- Floristella, near Piazza Armerina, now a mining park along with Grottacalda
- Grottacalda
- Musalà, near Pietraperzia
- Torricchia, near Regalbuto
- Gaspa La Torre Mine – Villapriolo
- Respica-Pagliarello Mine – Villarosa
- Santo Padre – (Villarosa)
- Garciulla – (Villarosa)
- Pietragrossa and Gallizzi
- Salinella Volpe

=== Province of Palermo ===
- Colle Croce (in the territory of Lercara Friddi)
- Colle Friddi (in the territory of Lercara Friddi)
- Colle Madore (in the territory of Lercara Friddi)
- Colle Serio (in the territory of Lercara Friddi)
- Fiorentino Colle friddi, in the vicinity of Lercara Friddi
- Sertorio, in the vicinity of Lercara Friddi, in the locality of Croce
- Social Cross Hill, in the vicinity of Lercara Friddi

== Extraction ==
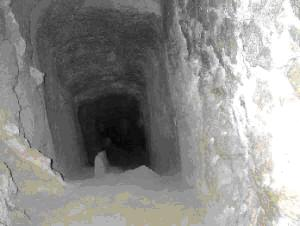
Entrance to a sulfur mine

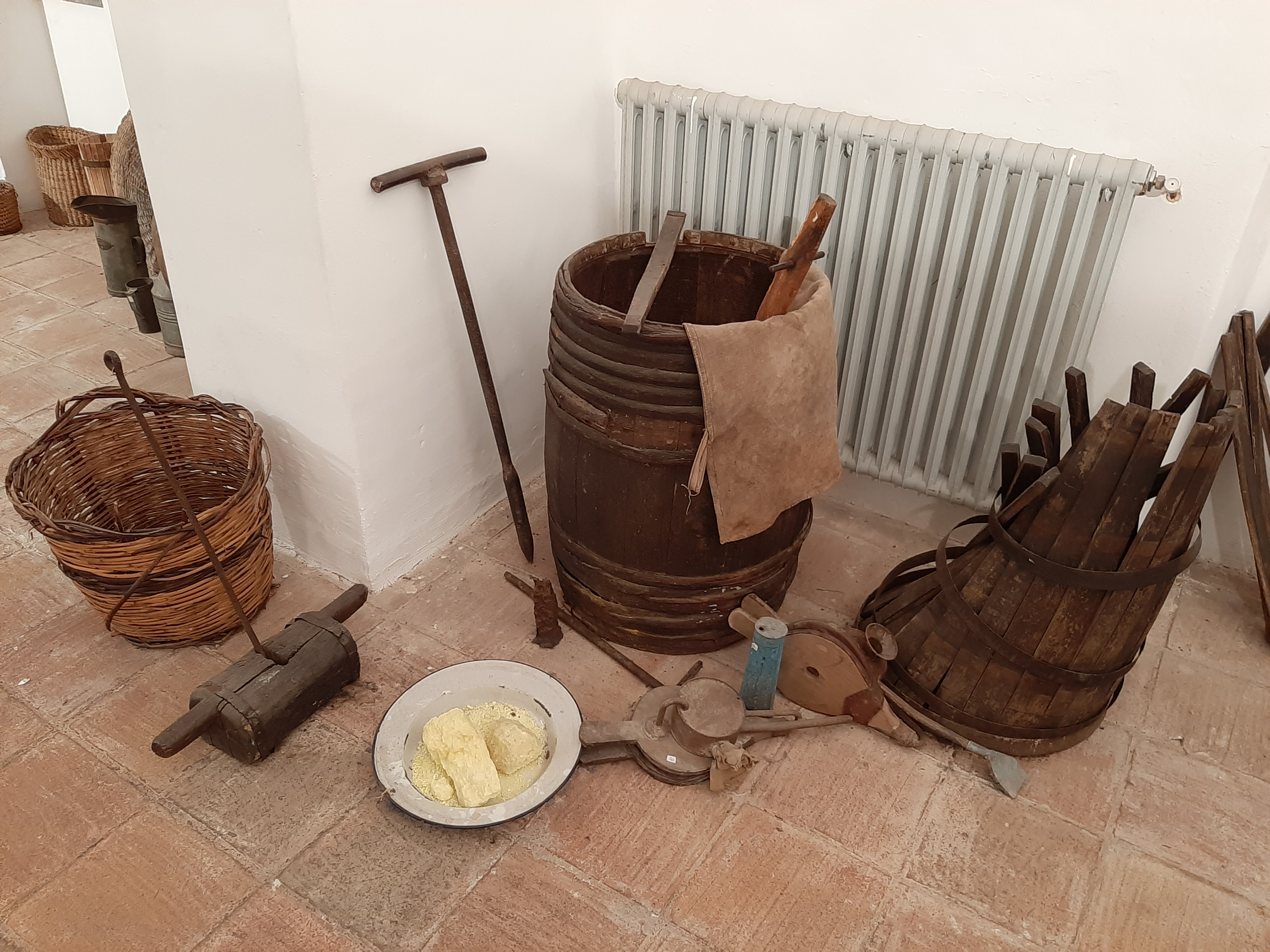
Ancient sulfur mining tools on display at the Nicola Barbato Civic Museum, Piana degli Albanesi

According to researchers, the archaeological finding of a relief inscription on a clay tablet in the Puzzu Rosi district, in the Comitini mining area in the Province of Agrigento, testifies to the exploitation of sulfide ore in Roman imperial times. It seems, however, from finds at Monte Castellazzo, that as early as 1600 B.C. there was trade in the product with Aegean peoples. It was generally outcropping ore and open-pit quarries found almost everywhere throughout the Nisseno-Agrigento area. The rudimentary method of excavation, with shovels, pickaxes and baskets for transport remained much the same until the threshold of the 19th century. The ever-increasing demand for sulfur, for the production of gunpowder, sulfuric acid and soda ash, especially from France and Great Britain, was met in the Kingdom of the Two Sicilies by encouraging the opening of new mines, in which the mineral was extracted by following the seam and digging new shafts and tunnels deeper and deeper. Miner work in Sicily was born at that time and, although it was very hard work, it was seen as an additional employment opportunity for the peasants who adapted to it without great difficulty. Genuine categories were formed, such as the pirriaturi (or pickaxe workers) who extracted ore and the carusi, often children as young as seven or eight years old. The Franchetti – Sonnino report, "Sicily in 1876," states:

However it may be, either that the master of the mine deals directly with the pickaxers, or with the partitioners, it is always the pickaxer who thinks of providing the boys needed to carry out the transportation of the ore he has dug, up to where the boxes are formed. Each pickaxeman employs an average of 2 to 4 boys. These boys, called carusi, are employed from the age of 7 and up; the greatest number count from 10 to 16. With loads of ore on their shoulders, they travel through the narrow tunnels dug in steps in the mountain, with slopes that are sometimes very steep, and whose angle varies on average from 50 to 80 degrees. There is no regularity in the galleries in the steps; they are generally higher than they are wide, and the foot barely rests on them. The galleries on average are about 1.30 to 1.80 meters high, and from 1 to 1.20 meters wide, but often less than 0.80 meters; and the steps from 0.20 to 0.40 meters high; and from 0.15 to 0.20 meters deep. The boys work underground from 8 to 10 hours a day, having to make a given number of trips, that is, carry a given number of loads. Boys employed in the open air work 11 to 12 hours. The load varies according to the age and strength of the boy, but it is always much more than a creature of tender age can carry, without serious damage to health and without danger of crippling himself. The youngest carry on their shoulders, unbelievable to say, a weight of 25 to 30 kilograms; and those sixteen to eighteen years old up to 70 and 80 kilograms.

They carried it to the surface with containers on their shoulders going up the narrow tunnels hundreds of times. The whole thing was supervised by overseers. The exploitation system involved the owner's assignment of the mine to the head picker (who had an interest in producing the maximum in order to be able to squeeze out a profit) in duty; the duty was paid in kind at the rate of 40–50% of the production obtained. The mining methods, however, always remained antiquated; this fact combined with the extreme exploitation of the miners' labor were often the cause of terrible accidents throughout the working period to the present day.

== Mine accidents ==
The already difficult conditions common to all mining workers were aggravated in Sicily by a feudal-like working condition similar to serfdom. Combined with the antiquated and rudimentary methods maintained by both foreign and Sicilian companies to avoid costly investments in infrastructure, it resulted in very frequent serious accidents with enormous human losses. Some of the most severe known events are:

- 1867, Trabonella Mine: gas explosion in the tunnel and fire with 42 confirmed fatalities.
- 1881, Gessolungo Mine: on November 12, a firedamp explosion inside the mine, generated by the flame of an acetylene lamp, massacred 65 miners. The victims included 19 boys, nine of whom remained unnamed, and their cemetery, called "dei carusi," can still be visited today near Gessolungo;
- 1882, Tumminelli Mine: 41 victims from asphyxiation.
- 1911, Trabonella Mine: gas explosion and fire that lasted 10 days with 40 victims.
- 1916, Cozzo Disi – Serralonga Mines (Casteltermini): On July 4, one of the most serious occupational disasters in the entire Italian mining history took place in the Cozzo Disi and Serralonga mines, placed in connection with each other. In fact, 89 sulfate workers lost their lives in the collapse of some tunnels and hydrogen sulfide emissions. The causes of the serious accident remain uncertain, although they oscillate around a main hypothesis: it admits a culpable nature in the disaster, which would have been caused by the collapse of a part of the mine due to the failure to fill with sterile material the voids caused by the extraction of ore.
- 1957, Trabia Mine: gas explosion and collapse of the Scordia shaft with many human casualties.
- 1958, Gessolungo Mine: another tragedy, which occurred on February 14, inspired Michele Straniero to write the lyrics to the song La zolfara (to music by Fausto Amodei), brought to success in 1959 by Ornella Vanoni.

== Refining methods ==
- Calcarelle (method of smelting by combustion; older and rudimentary)
- Calcarone (a more advanced type of furnace)
- Gill furnace (heat recovery smelting furnace)
- Froth flotation (method of preparing ore before refining)
- Frasch process (not usable in Sicily)

== Transport of the mineral ==
Sulfur was transported until almost the end of the 19th century by animal-drawn wagons to the embarkation landings located mostly on the Mediterranean coast of Sicily between Licata and Porto Empedocle. Toward the end of the century, the construction of tramways and small mine railways began, and the main mines also had transportation systems at the exit of the main tunnels consisting of hand-pushed wagons on rails that conveyed ore to the cars of narrow-gauge railroads that were built in large numbers but lagged behind what was needed.

In the years 1893–1894, the Raddusa-Sant'Agostino Tramway and the Porto Empedocle-Lucia Tramway were established by private individuals. In 1898 a 3-km-long horse-drawn tramway was built to connect the Trabonella mine to the Imera station. In 1904 a 10-km-long cableway was activated between the Trabia-Tallarita sulfur complex to the Campobello di Licata station. In 1908 a steam tramway to transport sulfur from the Pagliarello and Respica mines to the Villarosa station was established. In 1915 again a steam tramway also connected the Juncio-Stretto mines to the Imera railway station.

It was not until 1902, following the conclusions of a special Royal Commission and a law passed later that year, that the mode of construction and financing of Sicily's inland lines was defined, but these could only be built economically and with a narrow gauge. Even the first essential railways that connected the production areas to the ports of embarkation were built with much delay only from 1866 and reached from Palermo to the Lercara Friddi dock only in 1870, connecting Catania and its port with Caltanissetta only in 1876. Even the ports of embarkation in southern Sicily were little more than landing places and the largest ships moored offshore, forcing double transshipment on barges from the shore and loading then on the ship. The lack of efficient transportation facilities built slowly and with much delay is seen by many as one of the reasons for the economic collapse of the Sicilian sulfur industry. In 1904 a 10-kilometer cable car line was built to transport ore from the Trabia-Tallarita mine to the Campobello di Licata station, while another cable car connected the Trabonella mine to the Imera railway station between Caltanissetta and Enna. However, the construction of the actual railroad network did not begin until after the state had redeemed the Rete Sicula, and so after 1906 were built:

- The Dittaino-Piazza Armerina, serving the Enna area of Valguarnera, Grottacalda and Floristella, also projecting a branch at Bellia to Aidone since there were other deposits in the said municipality.
- The Dittaino-Leonforte, which served the Assoro mining group and was planned to continue to Agira and Regalbuto where other groups of mines were present.
- The Lercara-Magazzolo, which served both the Lercara Friddi and Cianciana basins and through the junction at Magazzolo on the Castelvetrano-Porto Empedocle Railroad, allowed mining transport to the port of embarkation.
- The Agrigento-Naro-Licata Railroad and its Naro-Canicattì branch line, which ran through the sulfur-bearing areas of Favara, Deli, and connected with Licata where refineries were established and with its port of embarkation.
- Also planned and partly built was the Canicattì-Caltagirone, which crossed the mining areas of Delia, Sommatino and Riesi (never activated) and the Motta Regalbuto which was intended to continue to Agira, Nicosia and the Tyrrhenian Sea, with a weld to the already planned Taormina-Alcantara-Randazzo Railroad (The latter was considered indispensable to revalue the Port of Messina by conveying mined goods and minerals there, since as early as 1866 the Ionian coastal railroad was in operation as far as Messina). As mentioned above, the program proceeded slowly, with some sections being completed on the threshold of the 1930s and others even after World War II, when markets had been lost and many sulfur mines had gone bankrupt.

== The sulfur culture ==
=== Museums ===
- At Caltanissetta: Sebastiano Mottura Mineralogical, Paleontological and Sulphur Field Museum
- At Villarosa Train Station Museum of Mining Art and Rural Life
- In Lercara Friddi: Museum and industrial park of the sulfur mine of Lercara.
- At Montedoro (CL): Museum of the sulfur mine
- At Villarosa: Museum of memory
- In Piazza Armerina: Lega zolfatai (1903)-Permanent exhibition of mining civilization
- In Casteltermini: Cozzo Disi Mine – Museum
- In Riesi: Trabia Tallarita Sulfur Mines Museum
- In Rome: Museum of Mineralogy – University of Rome "La Sapienza"

=== Art and literature ===
Having been for more than two centuries one of the roughest but most widespread activities in Sicily has made the sulfur mine one of the subjects most touched upon by poets, writers, novelists and storytellers. Alessio di Giovanni, a native of Cianciana, one of the sulfur centers of the Agrigento area, expressed the torment and despair of the workers-slaves of the mines in his Sunetti di la surfara, in the Sicilian language.

Luigi Pirandello, whose family ran sulfur mines, also wrote in his collection Novelle per un anno (Novels for a Year) about hard labor, especially child labor in the sulfur mines with the novellas Il fumo (The Smoke) and Ciàula scopre la luna (Ciàula discovers the moon). In fact, the sulfur theme intersects in various ways in his literary production as an inspirational motif in several novellas in which the world that gravitates around the sulfur mine is present. The mine run by his family that he calls the Cace, the big sulfur mine is featured in his famous novel The Old and the Young finished in 1913.

Leonardo Sciascia's Racalmuto-Regalpetra, a land of sulfur mines, resonates in his literary output as in The Parishes of Regalpetra.

Try, try to go down the crags of those stairs, – writes a citizen of Regalpetra, – visit those immense voids, that maze of comings and goings, muddy, exuberant with pestiferous exhalations, lit gloomily by the sooty flames of oil candles: sultry, oppressive heat, curses, a rumbling of pickaxe blows, reproduced by the echoes, everywhere naked men, dripping with sweat, men breathing laboriously, weary young men, dragging themselves with difficulty up the lurid stairs, young boys, almost children, to whom would be more suited the toys, the kisses, the tender maternal caresses, lending their slender bodies to the thankless labor to then increase the number of the deformed wretches. And when from the night of the sulfur mine the pickers and boys ascended to the incredible day of Sunday, the houses in the sun or the rain beating down on the roofs, they could only reject it, seek in wine a different way of sinking into the night, without thought, without feeling of the world.

— Leonardo Sciascia, Le parrocchie di Regalpetra, Aldelphi, 1991

The massacre of boys that occurred at the Gessolungo Mine on November 12, 1881 (whose cemetery, known as the cemetery of the carusi, can still be visited near Gessolungo today) was the inspiration for the lyrics of the song La zolfara by Michele Straniero, brought to success in 1959 by Ornella Vanoni:

Eight are the miners
killed in Gessolungo;
now the gentlemen weep
and bring them flowers.
They made in heaven
a long procession;
from that throne where he sits
Jesus Christ smiled at them.

— Michele Straniero, La zolfara

The terrible and frequent accidents in the sulfur mines inspired poets and writers. One of these, which occurred in 1951 in the mines of the Lercara Basin, was documented by writer Carlo Levi in his book Le parole sono pietre (Words are Stones):

June 18, a seventeen-year-old boy, Michele Felice, a "Carusu" working in the mine, was crushed by a boulder that fell from the vault of a tunnel, and died. This is a common occurrence: the dead man's father had also had his leg crushed by a landslide, in the sulfur mine. The dead man's paycheck was taken away, because, to die, he had not finished his day; and the five hundred miners were taken away an hour's pay, that in which they had suspended their work to free him from the boulder and bring him, from the bottom of the sulfur-bearing pit, into the light. The ancient sense of justice was touched, the centuries-old despair found, in that fact, a visible symbol, and the strike began.

— Carlo Levi, Le parole sono pietre

On September 13, 1895, the premiere of the play "La Zolfara" by Giuseppe Giusti Sinopoli was held in Catania.

== Mining Park ==
In 1991, a regional law established the Floristella-Grottacalda Mining Park Authority, in the province of Enna, whose Floristella mine, dating back to the late 18th century, operated until 1984. The park also includes the Grottacalda sulfur mine and the fine palace of the Baron of Floristella, Agostino Pennisi, an entrepreneur who made his home there with his family.

With two decrees of 1994 and 1996, the Sicilian Regional Department of Cultural and Environmental Heritage sanctioned the ethno-anthropological interest of the disused sulfur mines of Lercara Friddi.

In Catania, the citadel of sulfur, the industrial area that arose for sulfur processing, northeast of today's long abandoned Catania Centrale Station was rehabilitated in the 1970s by integrating new and old and creating Le Ciminiere, a fair, exhibition and convention area. The agglomeration of refining and milling plants and smokestacks occupied an area equal to the entire historic center, testifying to the importance of the sulfur sector to the Catania economy at the time.

On September 26, 2007, at the Chamber of Deputies (XV Legislature) the Bill No. 3067 was presented on the initiative of deputies Lomaglio, Aurisicchio, Buffo, Burgio, Burtone, Cacciari, Crisafulli, Daro, Di Salvo, Dioguardi, Fumagalli, Maderloni, Orlando, Rotondo, Samperi, Spini, Trupia, and Zanotti for the Establishment of the National Geominerary Park of the Sulfur Mines of Sicily; the decree lapsed with the end of the legislature in 2008. In 2010, the Trabia Tallarita Sulfur Mines Museum was inaugurated, a permanent exhibit at the Trabia (Riesi) mining site, which houses a rich historical-technical itinerary on the saga of Sicilian sulfur mines.

== See also ==
- Sulphur Crisis of 1840
- Narrow-gauge railways in Sicily

== Bibliography ==
- "Industria zolfifera in Sicilia". Il Politecnico – Giornale dell'ingegnere Architetto Civile e Industriale. 1: 51–54. January 1869 – via L'Emeroteca Digitale, Biblioteca Nazionale Braidense.
- Giuseppe Barone (2002). Le vie del Mezzogiorno. Roma: Donzelli. pp. 133–138.
- Brunetto, Calogero (2001). Le miniere di zolfo, in Campobello, cronache di un passato presente, pp. 69–78. Campobello di Licata: Edizioni Fontana.
- Orazio Cangila (1995). Storia dell'industria in Sicilia. Bari: Editori Laterza.
- Salvatore Carbone; Renato Grispo (1968). L'inchiesta sulle condizioni sociali ed economiche della Sicilia (1875–76). Bologna: Cappelli.
- Luigi Costanzo Catalano (1862). Sulle strade ruotabili da Catania a Caltanissetta e le ferrovie sino a Palermo. Catania: La fenice, tipografia di Musumeci.
- Coniglio, Angelo Felice (2012). The Lady of the Wheel (La Ruotaia). Mineola: Legas.
- Leopoldo Franchetti; Sidney Sonnino (1925). La Sicilia nel 1876, libro 2, parte III, capitolo supplementare. Firenze: Vallecchi.
- Galletti, Salvatore (1996). Súrfaru e Surfarara – Zolfo e Zolfatari. Caltanissetta: Lussografica.
- Giuseppe Giarrizzo (1986). Catania. Bari: Editori Laterza.
- Giuffrida, Romualdo (1967). Lo Stato e le ferrovie in Sicilia (1860–1895). Caltanissetta: Ed. Sciascia.
- Huré, Jean (2005). Storia della Sicilia. Brugherio (MI): Brancato Editore.
- Kutney, Gerald (2007). Sulfur: History, Technology, Applications & Industry.
- Carlo Levi (1955). Le parole sono pietre. Torino.
- Nico Molino (1985). La rete FS a scartamento ridotto della Sicilia. Torino: Edizioni elledi.
- Ignazio Nigrelli (1954). "La crisi dell'industria zolfifera siciliana in relazione al movimento dei Fasci". Movimento Operaio, rivista di storia e bibliografia, nuova serie (6, "I Fasci siciliani"). edito a cura della biblioteca G.G. Feltrinelli: 1050–1066.
- Roberti, Francesco (2012). Il Legendario "Surfararu". Barrafranca: Ed. Bonfirraro.
- Denis Mack Smith (1976). Storia della Sicilia medioevale e moderna. Vol. 3. Bari: Editori Laterza.
- Squarzina, Federico (1963). Produzione e commercio dello zolfo in Sicilia nel secolo XIX. ILTE.
- Leopoldo Franchetti; Sidney Sonnino (1876). La Sicilia nel 1876, Condizioni politiche e amministrative, appendice. La Barbera.
