= Michele Caltagirone =

Sicilian sculptor

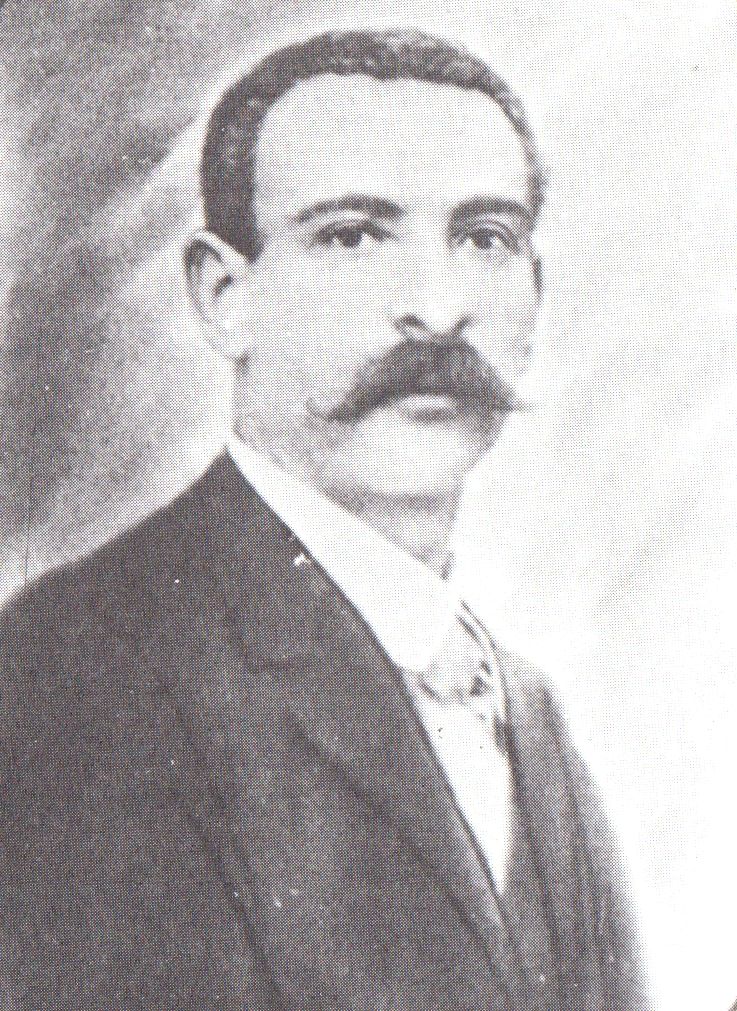
- Born: 2 September 1854; Casteltermini, Kingdom of the Two Sicilies
- Died: January 1, 1928 (aged 73); Casteltermini, Sicily, Italy

Michele Caltagirone (1854-1928) also known as il Quarantino was a Sicilian sculptor who spent most of his life in Casteltermini, Sicily, Italy. He is known for producing ecclesiastical works for various churches throughout Sicily using stone, wood, and clay.

== Early life ==
Caltagirone was born on 2 September 1854 to Girolamo Caltagirone and Maria Angela Lo Bue in Casteltermini, a commune in the province of Agrigento, Sicily, southern Italy. Although Sicilian feudalism was formally abolished during the Napoleonic Wars, much of the peasant class was excluded from rising in social status. Consequently, Caltagirone was expected to become a shoemaker, the profession of his father. As a young apprentice, he spent time away from his father's workshop to model and shape clay.

== Career ==
By the time Caltagirone was 25 years old, he had quit his occupation as a shoemaker to become a full time sculptor. He studied in Palermo for about two years to learn the techniques of sculpting wood before returning to Casteltermini to open a workshop. He was commissioned by monasteries, congregations, parish priests, and private citizens to create works that primarily focused on sacred images.

Michele Caltagirone remained an isolated person for most of his life. Having never married or had children, he died on 1 January 1928 in Casteltermini after becoming ill several months prior.

== Works ==
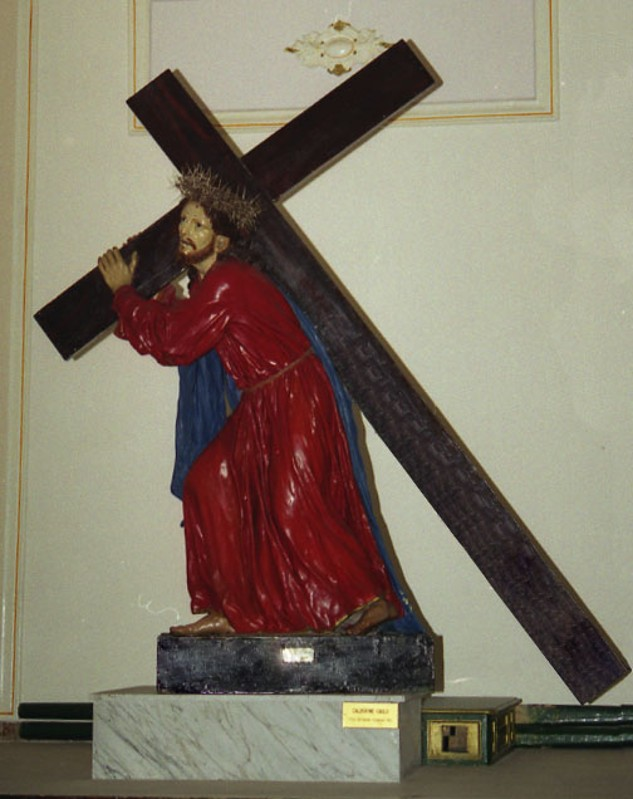
Jesus Christ Carrying the Cross, c. 1893.

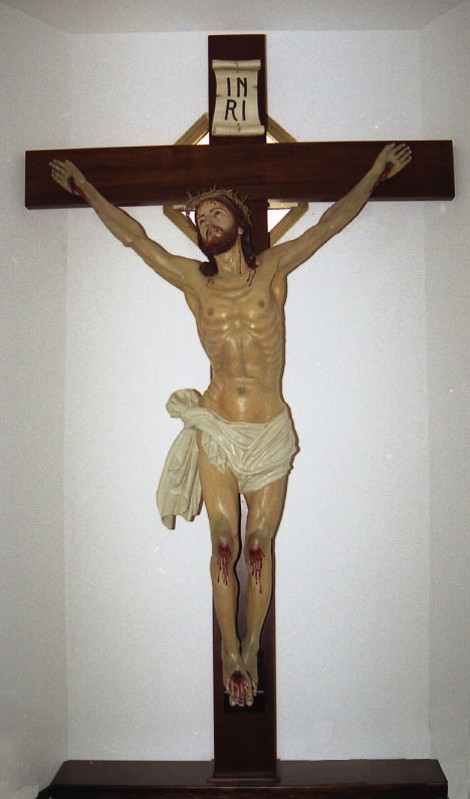
Crucifixion of Jesus Christ.

In Sicily and the United States:

- Wooden crucifix, Chiesa Madre Santa Maria della Luce, Acquaviva Platani, Italy, 1890.
- Wooden statue, Chiesa Madonna delle Grazie, Acquaviva Platani, Italy.
- Wooden statue of Francis of Assisi, Chiesa Anime Sante, Belmonte Mezzagno, Italy, c. 1924.
- Wooden statue of Francis of Assisi, Chiesa del Convento dei Cappuccini, Bivona, Italy, 1911.
- Colored terracotta (c. 30 cm) of Francis of Assisi, Bernard of Quintavalle, and Brother Leo, Chiesa del Convento dei Cappuccini, Bivona, Italy, c. 1910.
- Nativity scene (c. 30 cm) in colored terracotta, Chiesa del Convento dei Cappuccini, Bivona, Italy. Few figurines remain.
- wooden statues of Paschal Baylón and Anthony of Padua with colored terracotta, Chiesa del Convento dei Cappuccini, Caccamo, Italy, c. 1921.
- The stigmata of Francis of Assisi with Brother Leo in colored terracotta (c. 30 cm), c. 1920. Commissioned by the Chiesa del Convento dei Cappuccini, Caccamo, Italy, but was later removed to another church.
- The stigmata of Francis of Assisi with Brother Leo and Bernard of Quintavalle in colored terracotta (c. 30 cm), Chiesa del Convento dei Cappuccini, Caccamo, Italy, c. 1920. A copy was produced for P. Venanzio, Minister General of the Order of Friars Minor.
- Wooden crucifix (c. 140 cm), commissioned for municipal cemetery in Caccamo, Italy, c. 1921.
- Wooden statue of Francis of Assisi, Caltanissetta Cathedral, Caltanissetta, Italy, c. 1926.
- Redentore, Chiesa di Maria SS. dell’Itria, Campofranco, Italy, c. 1900.
- Schola Cantorum in colored terracotta (c. 20 cm), Convento dei Cappuccini, Monreale, Italy.
- Wooden statue of Francis of Assisi (c. 140 cm), Convento dei Cappuccini, Palermo, Italy.
- Francis of Assisi comforted by an angel in colored terracotta (c. 30 cm), Convento dei Cappuccini, Palermo, Italy.
- Wooden statue of Benedict of Nursia (c. 160 cm), Convento dei Benedettini, San Martino delle Scale, Italy, c. 1925.
- Ecce Homo, Chiesa del Convento dei Cappuccini, Sciacca, Italy, c. 1914. Formerly located at the Chiesa dei Cappuccini in Palermo.
- Wooden statue of Calogerus the Anchorite, Saint James Church, Trenton, New Jersey, United States of America, c. 1923.
- Wooden and Papier-mâché statue of Jesus, La Chiesa Madre, Casteltermini, Italy.

In Casteltermini:

- Nazareno, Chiesa Madre, 1893.
- wooden statue of John the Evangelist, Chiesa Madre, c. 1894.
- Sacra Familia, Chiesa Madre, c. 1919.
- wooden statue of Madonna, Chiesa Madre, c. 1908.
- wooden statue of Anthony of Padua, Chiesa Madre, c. 1910.
- Wooden statue of Saint Rosalia, Chiesa Madre, 1911.
- The Cenacle in colored terracotta (c. 30 cm), Chiesa Madre, c. 1906.
- Nativity scene in colored terracotta (c. 30 cm), Chiesa Madre. Few figurines remain intact.
- Francis of Assisi comforted by an angel in colored terracotta (c. 30 cm), Chiesa Madre. Has been relocated to a school in Casteltermini.
- Paul of Thebes in colored terracotta (c. 30 cm), Chiesa Madre. Has been relocated to a school in Casteltermini.
- Wooden statue of Francis of Assisi, Chiesa di San Francesco d'Assisi, c. 1890.
- Wooden statue of Madonna, Chiesa di San Francesco d'Assisi, c. 1898.
- Wooden statue of Saint John with child, Chiesa di San Francesco d'Assisi, c. 1896.
- Ecce Homo (c. 120 cm), Chiesa di San Francesco d'Assisi, c. 1901.
- La Maddalena, Chiesa di Gesù e Maria, c. 1910.
- Wooden crucifix (c. 140 cm), Chiesa del Carmine.
- Cristo Deposto, Chiesa di Santa Croce, c. 1906.
- Moses in stucco, Chiesa Madonna delle Grazie.
- Isaiah in stucco, Chiesa Madonna delle Grazie.
- Francis of Assisi among angels and friars in colored terracotta (c. 30 cm), Chiesa Madonna delle Grazie.
- Adoration of the Magi in colored terracotta (c. 30 cm), Chiesa Madonna delle Grazie. Some statues are missing.
- Wooden crucifix, c. 1922. Commissioned by the Chiesa di Malvello, but is currently located elsewhere.
- Wooden statue of John the Evangelist. Commissioned by the Chiesa di Malvello, but is currently located elsewhere.
