= Giuseppe Sorge =

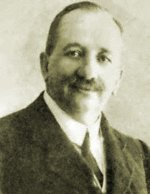
- Born: 23 January 1857; Sutera
- Died: 13 February 1937 (aged 80); Palermo
- Other names: Giuseppe Sorge Nola
- Occupations: Prefect and Director of public security
- Known for: Sicilian historical research

Giuseppe Sorge (January 23, 1857 – February 13, 1937) was an Italian historian, prefect and director of the public security. He was born in Sutera, Sicily.

== Biography ==
He came from a rich and distinguished family of Mussomeli. Son of Carmelo Sorce (1820–1896), administrator of the goods of Lanza Branciforte of Trabia, and of Maria Crocifissa Nola. In 1884 he married Maria Carolina Crima (1862–1917), nephew of Paolo Paternostro, Red Cross nurse who died during the First World War to fatal disease he contracted in the hospital in Brescia where he lavished.

He graduated in law at the College of San Rocco, Palermo. Admitted in service on 12 May 1880, in 1887 he was appointed Regio delegato straordinario of Bronte, during the epidemic of cholera. In 1892 appointed as regio delegato of Acireale and shortly after, he was appointed as sub-prefect of Termini Imerese (1893–94) and in that period, he was involved in the bloody repression of the Fasci Siciliani. He was later appointed Prefect of Girgenti (1 October 1904 – 15 April 1907) and subsequently in Lecce (5 April 1907 – 1 October 1909) where he founded a consortium for health supervision security in the province of Terra d'Otranto. In 1909 he was appointed Prefect of Brescia (1 October 1909 – 1 January 1912) and Naples (1 January 1912 – 16 May 1914) where he was appointed Prefect of first class (May 22, 1931). He relocated to Brescia (1 October 1915 – 1 September 1917). Later assigned to Venice (1 September 1917 – 1 November 1917) where it was placed at the disposal of the Ministry of Interior which appointed him Director General of Public Security (29 September 1917 – 10 March 1919) under the Ministry Orlando. He ceased office on 25 February 1919.

He died in Palermo on 13 February 1937. He was buried in the cemetery of St. Ursula Palermo, next to his wife Maria Carolina Crima.

=== Recognitions ===
He was promoted to Grand Officer of the Order of the Crown of Italy.

== Bibliography ==
=== Books ===
- (in Italian) "Mussomeli dall'origine all'abolizione della feudalità, 1910–1916" (Catania, Niccolò Giannotta Editore, 1916, reprinted by Edizioni Ristampe Siciliane, Palermo 1982.)
- (in Italian) "Il cantore di Rosa fresca: divagazioni d'un dilettante" (Palermo, Tipografia Michele Montaina, 1925)
- (in Italian) "I Teatri di Palermo nei secoli XVI-XVII-XVIII, Saggio Storico" (Palermo, Industrie Riunite Editoriali Siciliane, 1926, pp. 419, in-8, m.tela)
- (in Italian) "Mussomeli nel secolo XIX, Cronache dal 1812 al 1900" (Palermo, Tipografia Michele Montaina, 1931)

=== Letters and Speeches ===
- (in Italian) "Relazione al Consiglio comunale di Bronte" (Palermo, Tipografia f.lli Puglisi, 1887) relation red on 26 November 1887 from regio delegato straordinario avv. Giuseppe Sorge.
- (in Italian) Letter to G.Lodi (4 October 1904 – Societa' Siciliana per la Storia Patria)
- (in Italian)"Sull'azione spiegata dal Ministero dell'Interno e dalle Prefetture per l'applicazione della Legge 19 giugno 1913 n. 632 contro l'alcoolismo" relation presented to the "Commissione di Statistica e Legislazione" at Ministry of Justice in April–May 1918 (Rome. Tipografia L. Cecchini, 1919)
- (in Italian) "Sulle dimostrazioni antiaustriache del 1914 – Lettera aperta a S.E. Antonio Calandra" (Palermo, Industrie Riunite Editoriali Siciliane, 1926)
- (in Italian) "Testimonianza resa al tribunale di Palermo da Giuseppe Sorge quale direttore generale di P.S. il 1º ottobre 1917 in relazione al magazzino dei generi requisiti a navi nemiche " (Archivio Storico della Camera dei deputati, Archivio della Camera Regia 1848–1943, Commissioni parliamentari d'inchiesta)
- (in Italian) Letter to Luigi Sturzo (7 November 1918 – Archivio Beni di Stato)
