= Achille Campisiano =

French pianist and composer

Achille Domenico Campisiano (12 November 1837 – 17 April 1908) was an Italian-born French pianist and composer. Also known under the pseudonym Achille de Campisiano, he composed opéras comiques, operettas and opéras bouffes.

== Biography ==
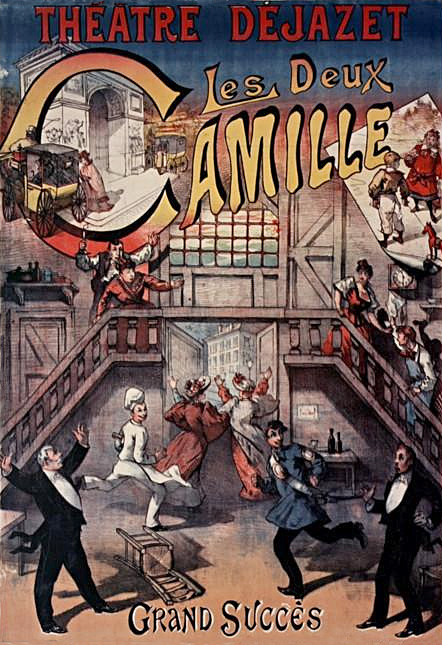
Poster for the Theatre Déjazet (1891)

Born in Naro, in the province of Agrigento, Sicily, he was the son of Salvatore Campisiano, a jeweller, and Maria Carolina Rochia from a family of Sicilian origin who lived in Marseille. It was in Marseille that Achille Campisiano received his first tuition in musical composition, between 1850 and 1857. In 1866 he was hired by the Café de la Renaissance in Montargis. Around 1867 Campisiano replaced a Monsieur Batifort at the Cheval-Blanc, pianist and composer for the Érard concerts, around 1893.

Campisiano directed comic operas and operettas for touring companies before becoming director of the Théâtre Déjazet around 1885, where he resumed the vaudeville tradition that had once made the theatre's fortune. He attached importance to the quality of the music and entrusted parts of the production to Léon Schlesinger, Isaac Strauss's grandson.

He died in Paris aged 70 and is buried in the cemetery at Donzy.

== Selected works ==
Achille de Campisiano wrote more than 200 works, including:

- Tu n' le voudrais pas (libretto: Philibert), c.1866
- Avec les Loups, ditty (published by A. Jacquot), c.1868
- Du fil de la vierge, dans une goutte d'eau (published by Ch. Grou), 1869
- Absalon, operetta (Burani, Pouillon), c.1876
- Bouton d'or, opéra comique (Launay, Dharmenon), c.1882
- Un Carnaval, opéra bouffe (Pouillon, Burani), c.1882
- Les Ruses d'Amour, opéra comique (Lucien Gothi), c.1882
- En route pour Chicago, opéra bouffe (L. Gothi), c.1882
- Les Roses d'amour, opéra comique (L. Gothi), c.1883
- Au fond de cale, "tableau maritime musicale" (L. Gothi), c.1885
- Javotte, three-act opéra comique (Bernard Lopez), c.1886
- Le Petit Pélure d’oignon, performed at the Folies-Bergère, 1890
- En avant!, marche héroïque (Riffey et Maillot), with piano accompaniment, c.1891
- Le Domino rose, c.1896, performed at a concert du Cercle militaire, 4 February 1896
- Le Phénomène du père Magloire, operetta, Mathias, Gadix and Campisiano, c.1904
