= Sutera =

Sutera Sotýras (Greek)
- Comune
- Comune di Sutera
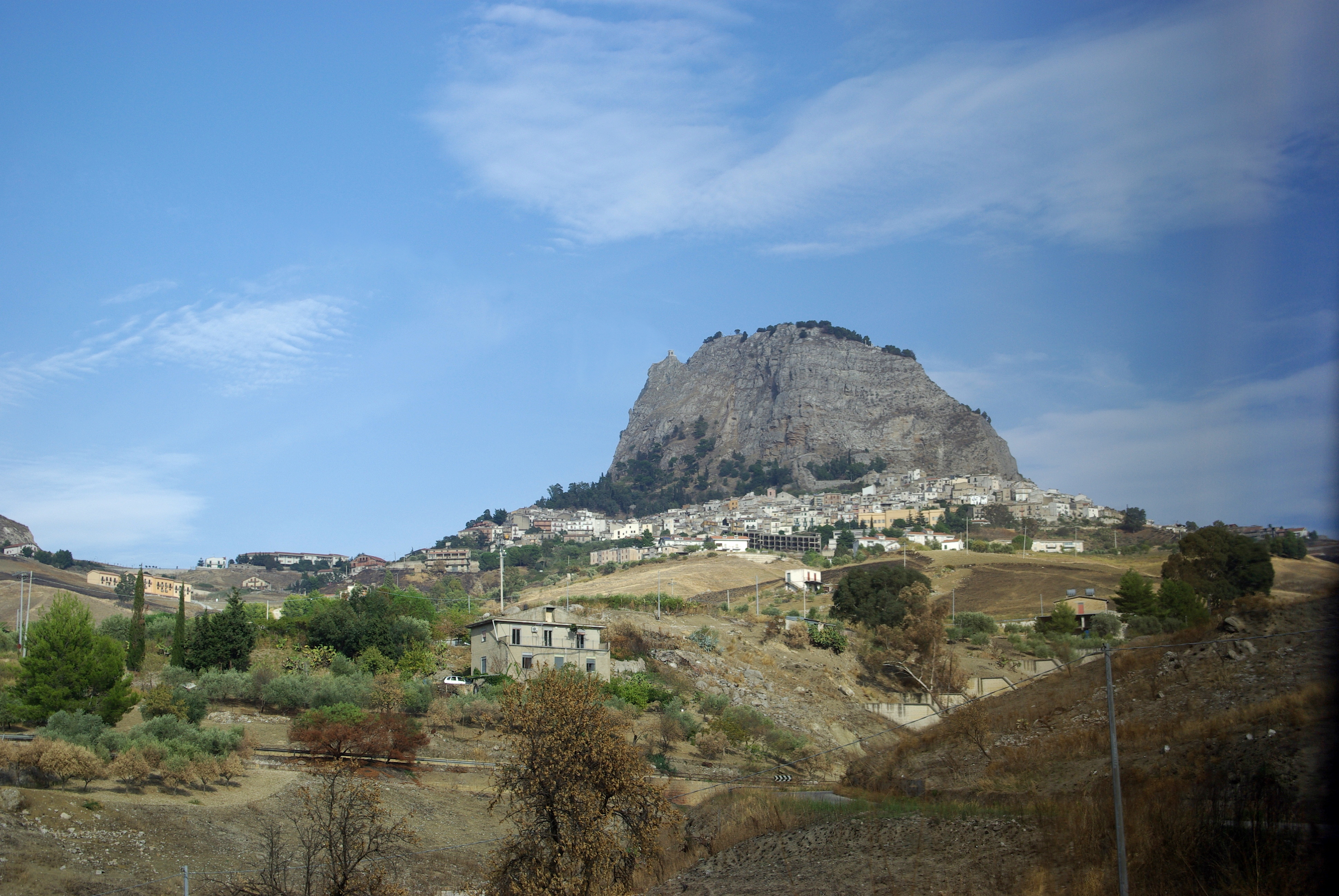

- Location within Italy Location within Sicily
- Coordinates: 37°32′N 13°44′E
- Country: Italy
- Region: Sicily
- Province: Province of Caltanissetta (CL)

Government
  - Mayor: Giuseppe Grizzanti

Area
  - Total: 35.5 km^{2} (13.7 sq mi)
- Elevation: 590 m (1,940 ft)

Population (Dec. 2004)
  - Total: 1,649
  - Density: 46.5/km^{2} (120/sq mi)
- Demonym: Suteresi
- Time zone: UTC+1 (CET)
  - Summer (DST): UTC+2 (CEST)
- Postal code: 93010
- Dialing code: 0934
- Patron saint: Maria Madre di Carmine, St. Paolino and St. Onofrio
- Saint day: St. Paolino first Tuesday after Easter. St. Onofrio First Sunday of August
- Website: Official website

Sutera is a comune (municipality) in the Province of Caltanissetta in the Italian region Sicily, located about 70 kilometres (43 mi) southeast of Palermo and about 30 kilometres (19 mi) west of Caltanissetta. It is one of I Borghi più belli d'Italia ("The most beautiful villages of Italy"). As of 31 December 2004, it had a population of 1,649 and an area of 35.5 square kilometres (13.7 mi^{2}).

Sutera borders the following municipalities: Acquaviva Platani, Bompensiere, Campofranco, Casteltermini, Milena, Mussomeli.

Sutera is twinned with the Borough of Broxbourne in England.

In the 21st century, after the population decreased because of the lack of work in the area, the town was transformed by the influx of asylum seekers which saved the local school and boosted the local economy.

== People linked to Sutera ==
- Giuseppe Sorge (1857–1937), historian, prefect and director of the public security.
- Giuseppe Mormino (1880–1955) Senator, Prefect and Politician.
