= Carusu =

Child labourers in Sicilian sulfur mines

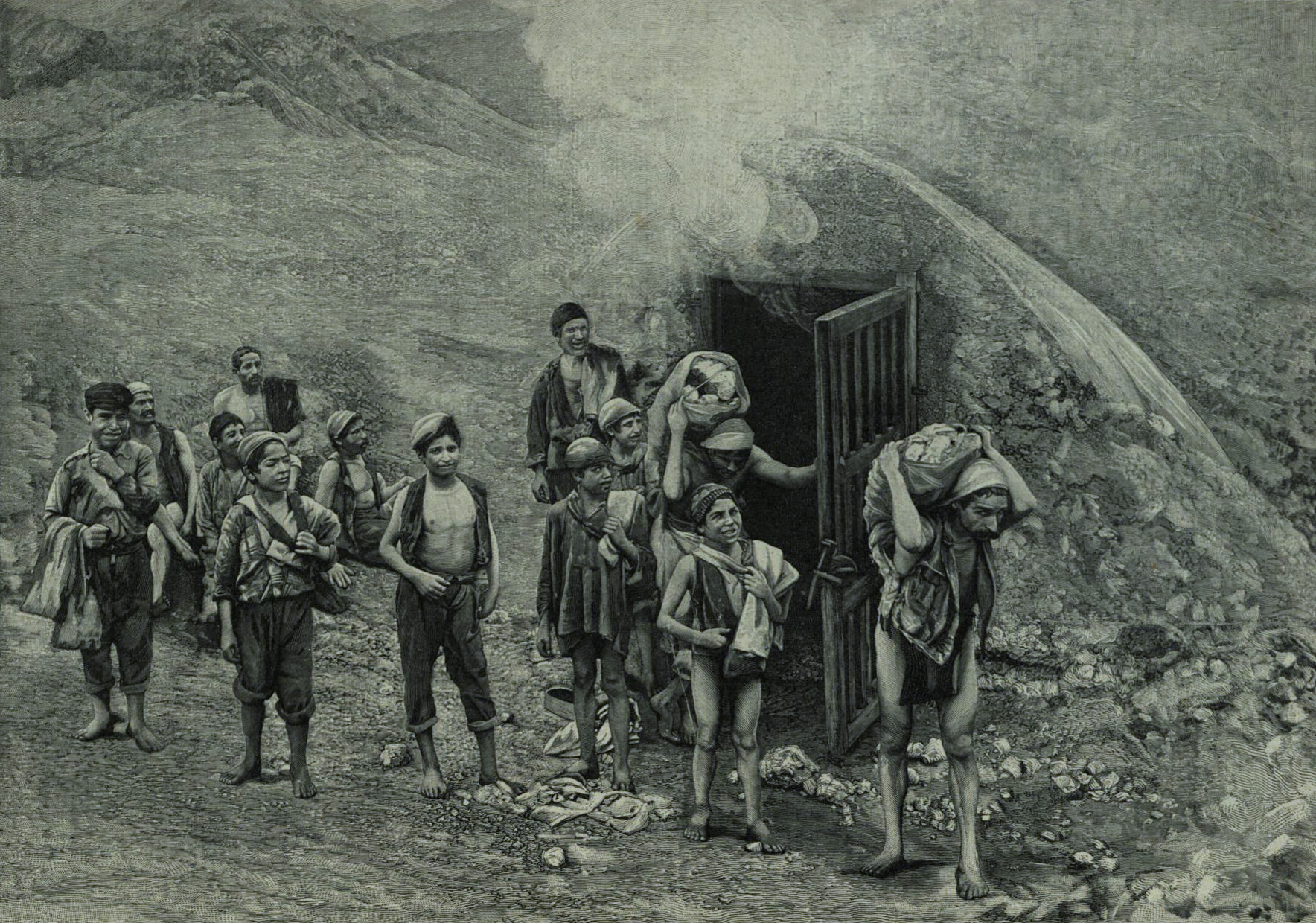
Group of carusi in the sulfur mines of Sicily, 1894

Carusu (plural carusi) is the Sicilian word for "boy" and is derived from the Latin carus which means "dear". In the mid-1800s through the early 1900s in Sicily, carusu was used to denote a "mine-boy", a labourer in a sulfur, salt or potash mine who worked next to a picuneri or pick-man, and carried raw ore from deep in the mine to the surface. The working conditions under which they were employed were appalling and sparked public outrage and inspired many complaints.

As with other mining industries, the use of carusi declined as mines switched to other, more efficient methods of transporting minerals to the surface, and the use of children is said to have ended by the 1920s or 1930s, but teenagers were still employed to carry ore to the surface until the 1950s.

== Working conditions ==
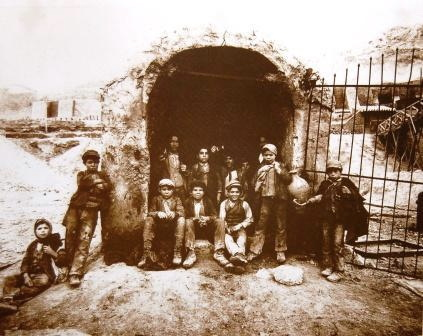
Carusi (boys) before a sulfur mine, 1899 (Photo: Eugenio Interguglielmi)

These carusi generally worked in near-slavery, often given up by foundling homes or even by their own families for a succursu di murti (death benefit), which effectively made them the property of either the picuneri or of the owners of the mines. Often "recruited" as young as five to seven years of age, once they were thus encumbered, many lived their whole lives as carusi, and in many cases not only worked, but ate and slept in the mines or nearby. A parent or foundling home official could redeem them by paying back the death benefit, but in the poverty-stricken Sicily of the time, this was a rare occurrence.

The conditions of the carusi in the Sicilian sulfur mines were described by two politicians from mainland Italy, Leopoldo Franchetti and Sidney Sonnino who had travelled to Sicily in 1876 to conduct an unofficial inquiry into the state of Sicilian society:

The children work under ground 8 to 10 hours a day, having to perform a specific number of trips, in order to carry a given number of loads from the tunnel excavation until the collection point in the open air. […] The load varies according to the age and strength of the boy, but it is always much higher than a creature of such a young age normally can carry without serious damage to health or risk of mutilation. Incredibly enough, the younger children carry on their shoulders weights of 25 to 30 kilos, and those of sixteen to eighteen years 70 and 80 kilos.

As a result, the minimum age was increased to 10 years by government decree in 1876. In 1905 the minimum age was raised to 14 years and in 1934 to 16. In 1911 it was reported that the law was not rigidly enforced, however.

In October 1893, at the time of the Fasci Siciliani, a congress of miners was held in Grotte, a sulfur-mining town in the province of Agrigento, which was attended by some 1,500 people, including workers and small producers in the sulfur mines. The miners demanded that the minimum age to be raised to 14 years for those who worked in the mines, the decrease of working hours and setting a minimum wage. Small producers demanded measures to avoid exploitation by large owners who controlled the storage market and pocketed all the profits. The minimum-age measure was meant to improve the situation for the carusi that sparked public outrage and inspired many complaints.

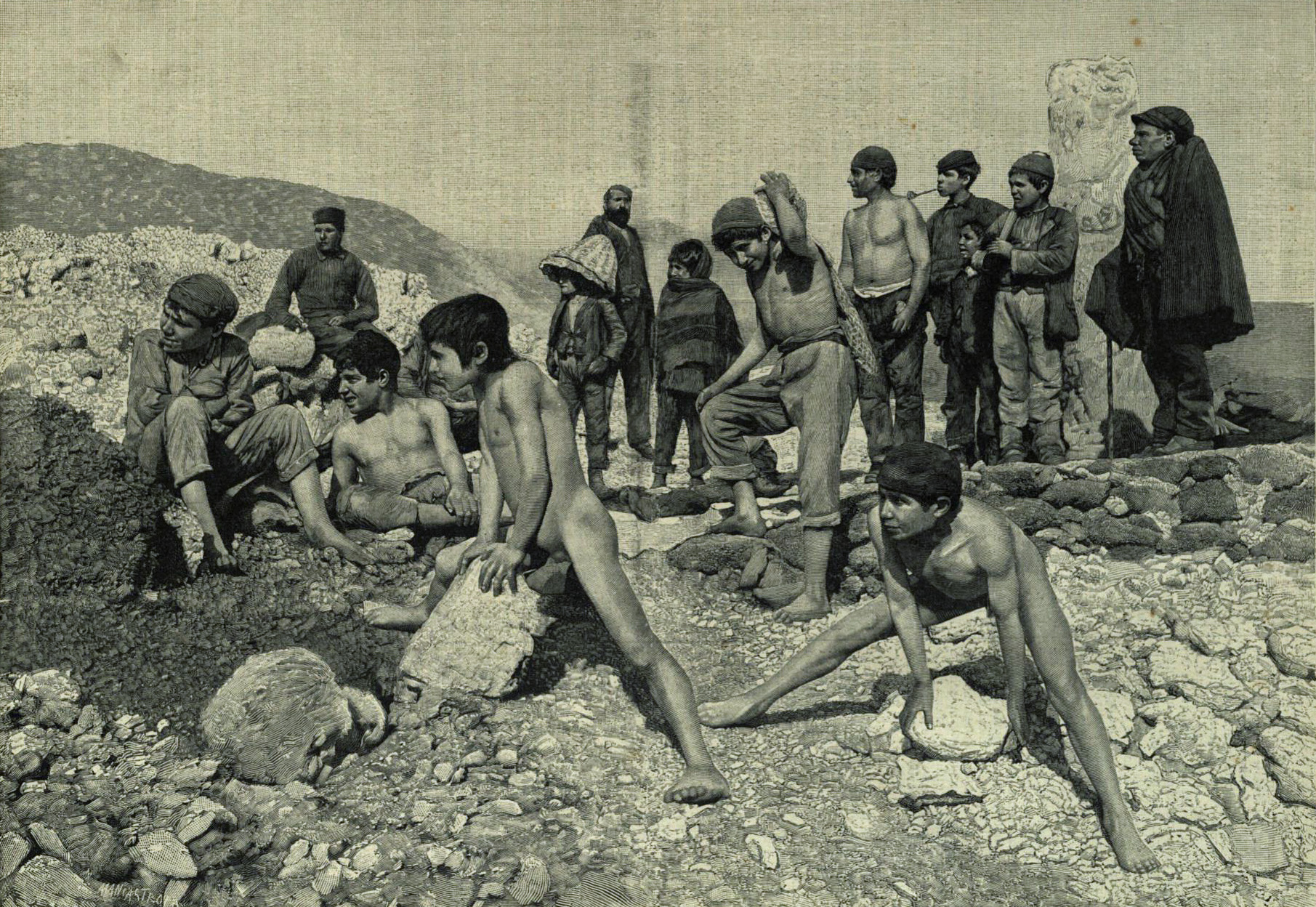
Group of carusi in the sulfur mines of Sicily, 1894

The journalist Adolfo Rossi, who in October 1893 reported on the Fasci in Sicily for the liberal Roman daily La Tribuna, visited the area and descended into the sulfur mine of Virdilio to report on the appalling labour conditions of the carusi, interviewing some of them.

Starting work at eight or nine years of age, they generally have hunched shoulders from excessive fatigue, crooked teeth, hollow eyes from insufficient nutrition, and foreheads furrowed with premature wrinkles. The law that should protect child labour and according to which no child can be a caruso unless he is at least twelve years old is not enforced. […] Most of them told me that they earned fifty cents a day and that this wage was not paid to them in money but in poor-quality flour at a price higher than that charged in neighbouring villages.

Rossi, a seasoned war correspondent who had seen his share of atrocities, wrote that no spectacle had affected him as deeply as that of the conditions of the carusi in the sulfur mine: "This barbaric work imposed on such tender children (who, in the state in which they live, are also victims of pederasty and other horrors) is something that cries out for vengeance; it is the negation of every principle of humanity. It is shameful to be born in a country where such barbarism still exists."

The horrific conditions in Sicilian sulfur mines prompted Booker T. Washington − himself an African-American born a slave – to write in 1910: "I am not prepared just now to say to what extent I believe in a physical hell in the next world, but a sulphur mine in Sicily is about the nearest thing to hell that I expect to see in this life." He had traveled to Europe to acquaint himself, in his words: "with the condition of the poorer and working classes in Europe". As an eyewitness, he described the plight of the carusi as follows:

From this slavery there is no hope of freedom, because neither the parents nor the child will ever have sufficient money to repay the original loan. [...]
The cruelties to which the child slaves have been subjected, as related by those who have studied them, are as bad as anything that was ever reported of the cruelties of Negro slavery. These boy slaves were frequently beaten and pinched, in order to wring from their overburdened bodies the last drop of strength they had in them. When beatings did not suffice, it was the custom to singe the calves of their legs with lanterns to put them again on their feet. If they sought to escape from this slavery in flight, they were captured and beaten, sometimes even killed.

The British physician Sir Thomas Oliver visited the mines in Lercara Friddi in 1910 as well and described working conditions in the British Medical Journal:

The ore got by the men is carried on the shoulders of barefooted, scantily-clad boys up the steep and worn steps to the surface. As these carusi are not always given lights, the journeys up and down are made in the dark. Many are the sad accidents which-- have taken place owing to the carussi slipping. The boys and their burden roll down the steps, entangling in their descent other carussi who may be ascending.

The abysmal working conditions often caused a physical and moral degradation. Illiterates with no schooling, frequently maltreated and with lopsided bodies and misformed knees due to carrying heavy loads. Partial or complete loss of vision was not uncommon among the miners as the result of injuries to the eyes. Oliver was "struck by the short stature and defective development of the men who transport the ore on their shoulders. Some of the men whom I measured, although 30 years of age and upwards, were only 4 ft. high, and in mental development were but as children." He observed that: "so diminutive in stature are these men, and so deformed physically, that the Government can hardly obtain in a sulphur mining district conscripts for the army."

The consequences of the inhuman working conditions continued for the rest of the carusu's life. According to Oliver:

In addition to the boys, transporting the ore, the work is also done by men who commenced life in the mines as carusi, and who, as the result of having for years carried ore upon their shoulders, present a large hump on their back upon which the ore rests, a deflected spine, deformed lower extremities, and a distorted chest.

The sulfur-mining town of Lercara Friddi, for instance, was nicknamed the "town of the humpbacks" (u paisi di jmmuruti) by the surrounding municipalities.

== In literature and film ==
- Acla's Descent into Floristella is a 1992 Italian film directed by Aurelio Grimaldi, about a young carusu, horribly abused in the sulfur mines, who tries to run away.
- The short stories "Il Fumo" ("Fumes," 1901) and "Ciàula scopre la luna" ("Ciàula discovers the moon," 1912) by Nobel Prize–winning author Luigi Pirandello tell the story of the enslavement of children as beasts of burden in the mines to haul the ore from the depths of the earth.

== See also ==
- Sulfur mining in Sicily
