= Castello di Bifar =

- Campobello di Licata, Sicily, Italy

Site information
- Type: Castle

Location
- Coordinates: 37°12′1″N 13°57′30″E

Site history
- Built: 11th century
- Fate: Destroyed, 1693

The Castello di Bifar was a castle in Campobello di Licata, Sicily. It was built in around the 11th century, and was captured by the Normans in around 1086. The castle is only known from documents such as the writings of Goffredo Malaterra.

The castle was destroyed in the 1693 Sicily earthquake, and no remains have survived today.
