= Silvio Benedetto =

Argentine painter and sculptor (1938–2026)

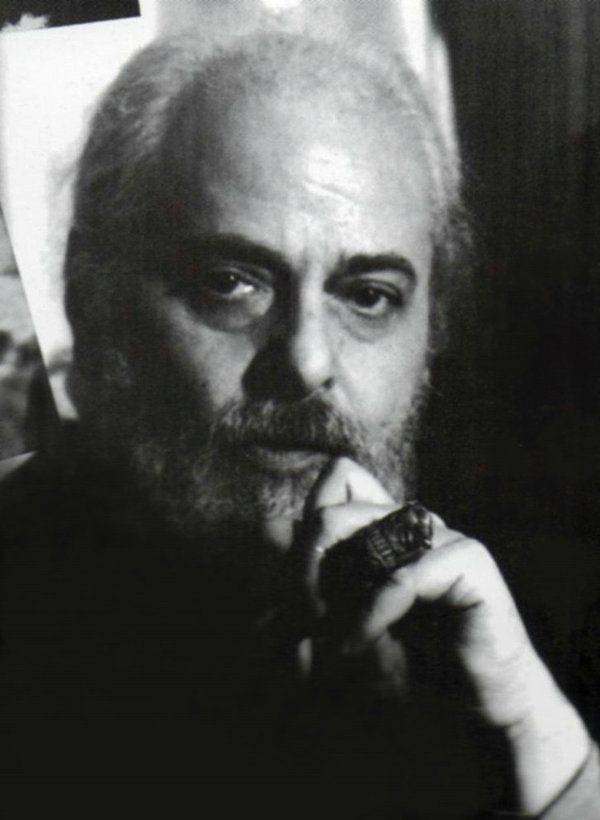
Benedetto in 1998

Silvio Benedicto Benedetto (March 21, 1938 – May 16, 2026) was an Argentine painter and sculptor who was a naturalized Italian.

== Life and career ==
=== Early life ===
Silvio Benedetto was born in Buenos Aires on March 21, 1938, to a family of artists of Italian origin. His grandfather Benito Caldarella was a portrait photographer, his mother Adela Caldarella was a painter, ceramist and prose actress; his father Juan Valente Benedetto was an actor and journalist in Buenos Aires, where he founded the first association of journalists.

=== Argentina from 1950 ===
In 1956, at the age of eighteen, he won the 1st Prize at the 2nd Biennial of Pan-American Sacred Art in Buenos Aires. Between 1957 and 1961 his work was the subject of several solo exhibitions, including the "Museo Provincial de Bellas Artes" (now Museo Provincial de Bellas Artes Timoteo Navarro) of Tucumán.

=== Italy from 1961 ===
In 1961 he moved to Italy and has some solo exhibitions in various galleries, including the "Penelope", the "Zanini", the "New Weight" in Rome, the "Compass" in Turin, the "De 'Foscherari" in Bologna and the "Gianferrari" in Milan. He settled permanently in Rome and collaborated with photographer David Racanelli in the founding and initial management of the Gallery "Due Mondi".

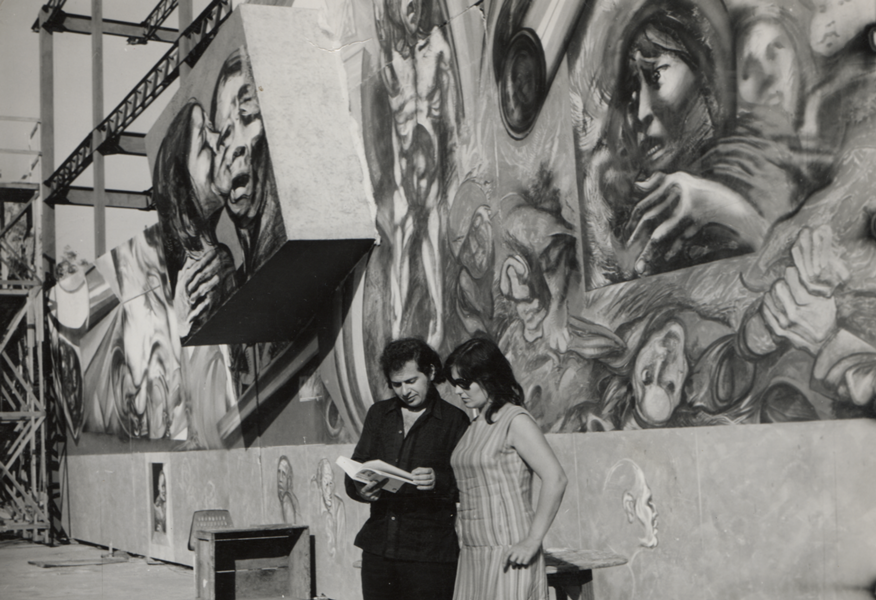
Silvio Benedetto with Luisa Racanelli in front of his mural of the Casino de la Selva 1967

=== Mexico and Ecuador from 1967 ===
During this period, he traveled and worked in Latin America, collaborating in the creation of the mural "La Marcha de la Humanidad" in the World Trade Center complex in Mexico City. During this period, Marta Traba wrote in the catalog of the Gallery of Modern Art of Colombia: "Silvio Benedetto has recently been the scandalous case of Latin American painting, contender of Guayasamín, protester of Siqueiros, winner in Mexico of an abnormal mural". At the Casino de la Selva, in Cuernavaca, in fact he painted a mural, with a rectangular plan of 30 meters, for 50, entitled "Progreso y Violencia", which was destroyed. Seventy of his works remain in Cuernavaca and are gathered in a museum named after him (of note in this extensive collection are the "Dialogues": "Great Deposition with Christ by Mantegna", "The Shooting of Goya in the Studio", "The Flood by Paolo Uccello"). While working in Ecuador he also created one of his murals at the university of Guerrero.

=== Europe from the 1970s ===
Between the mid-1960s and early 1990s, he made numerous engravings and lithographs at the printing house "Il Torcoliere" and "The Felt" in Rome, and exhibited in several European cities. In the fire of the Palace Hotel in Mondello in 1973 his painting "Ratto di Santa Teresa – dialogo con Bernini" was destroyed; on the same theme will remain only a folder of engravings with a preface by Leonardo Sciascia. It introduces the manifesto "Art as action in the urban context" to Palermo, in occasion of its installation "Man-Christ" (polyhedral structure of 33 m of height). The installation of December 1974 was ti bd be dismantled after a few days by the municipal administration, because "representing a Christ not suitable for Christmas. This will provoke infinite polemics. They signef the manifesto of Benedict, aling with many exponents of culture and art, including: Bruno Zevi, Luigi Nono, Enrico Crispolti, Leonardo Benevolo, and Cesare Zavattini. He was invited, in 1977, to the X Quadrennial of Rome – Foreign artists working in Italy, where he presented his "Trilogy": "Flood", "Procession" and "Greek Tragedy". In Normandy the Museum of Fine Arts of Fécamp set up a solo exhibition. In 1992 the Norman Palace in Palermo hosted his first exhibition of sculpture: "The Metaphor of the Mountain".

Benedetto began in Campobello di Licata the design, together with Olga Macaluso, of the Valley of the Painted Stones (110 polychrome boulders, in travertine of two meters by three, painted in several sides) on the Divine Comedy by Dante Alighieri. Invited to the exhibition "Raum!" at the Vienna Künstlerhaus, he exhibited in 1998 his installation "Via Scialoja 6 at the Künstlerhaus" and presented a performance inspired by Goethe's Faust. From 1999 on the National Park of the Cinque Terre has engaged the artist in the realization of the project "The artistic itineraries in the National Park of the Cinque Terre". Silvio Benedetto, in fact, created and realized large mural paintings in the five railway stations of the municipalities of the Park: Riomaggiore, Manarola, Corniglia, Vernazza, and Monterosso uniting them through a single thread, by style and theme, thus creating a tourist-cultural "path". He also designed and realized the decoration of Piazza Capellini in Manarola, with the collaboration of Silvia Lotti in the realization of the terracotta tiles and the collaboration of his daughter Flavia Benedetto in the creation of the circular decoration in the center of the square. Inauguration, also in Manarola, of the monument to Fabrizio De André. Along the entire wall (157 meters) of the pedestrian tunnel of Riomaggiore (leading from the station to the center of the country) he creates "The Sequence of Memory": a multi-material mosaic with shaped tiles, glazed majolica, polished, and with the use of various materials such as stones, pebbles, marble (including red and green Levanto), crystals, mirrors, shells, pottery, the mosaic depicts the coast of the Cinque Terre. In 2000 he realizes at the Arsenale Marittimo Militare of La Spezia, the mural "Tradizione Tecnologia Arte" and several sculptures-assemblage as well as a performance within the Smart. In 2001 he started "L'Iliade in terra e fuoco", a ceramic mural of meters 7,30 for 3,10, composed of majolica of different shapes, with figurative subjects on the theme of the Iliad. Of the Iliad by Silvio Benedetto there is also a graphic work (realized in the same year).

Benedetto died on May 16, 2026, at the age of 88.

== Bibliography ==
- David A. Siqueiros, “Como se pinta un mural” – Città del Mexico – 1951
- Giorgio Di Genova, Calabria-Guccione-Quattrucci-Verrusio/ Maria Luisa Eustachio e Antonio Borrelli/ Gianfranco Ferroni/ Silvio Benedetto/ Carroll – Roma, Libreria terzo mondo – 1964
- Leonardo Benevolo, Mario De Micheli, Giorgio Di Genova, Emilio Garroni, “Silvio Benedetto” Ed. Il Tucano – 1966
- Emilio Garroni, “Silvio Benedetto o Il grado zero del realismo” – Galleria Due Mondi −1967
- Serie Arte Contemporanea – Ed. UNEDI – 1979
- “Roma contemporanea” – Galleria Comunale d'Arte Moderna e Contemporanea di Roma – 1995
- “Gli Itinerari artistici” Ed. Parco Nazionale delle Cinque Terre – 2002
- Domenico Guzzi, "L'anello mancante"- Figurazione in Italia negli anni '60 e '70 – Collana "contributi alla storia dell'arte" – Laterza – 2003
- “L'Iliade di Silvio Benedetto” Ed. Kalòs – 2006
- ”Itinerari Artistici del Parco Nazionale delle Cinque Terre – Opere di Silvio Benedetto”, Confidenziale Gruppi 07 del Parco Nazionale delle Cinque Terre – 2007

== Sister projects ==
- Wikimedia Commons contiene immagini o altri file su Silvio Benedetto
