= Naro =

Naro Akràgas Ionicòn (Greek)
- Comune
- Comune di Naro
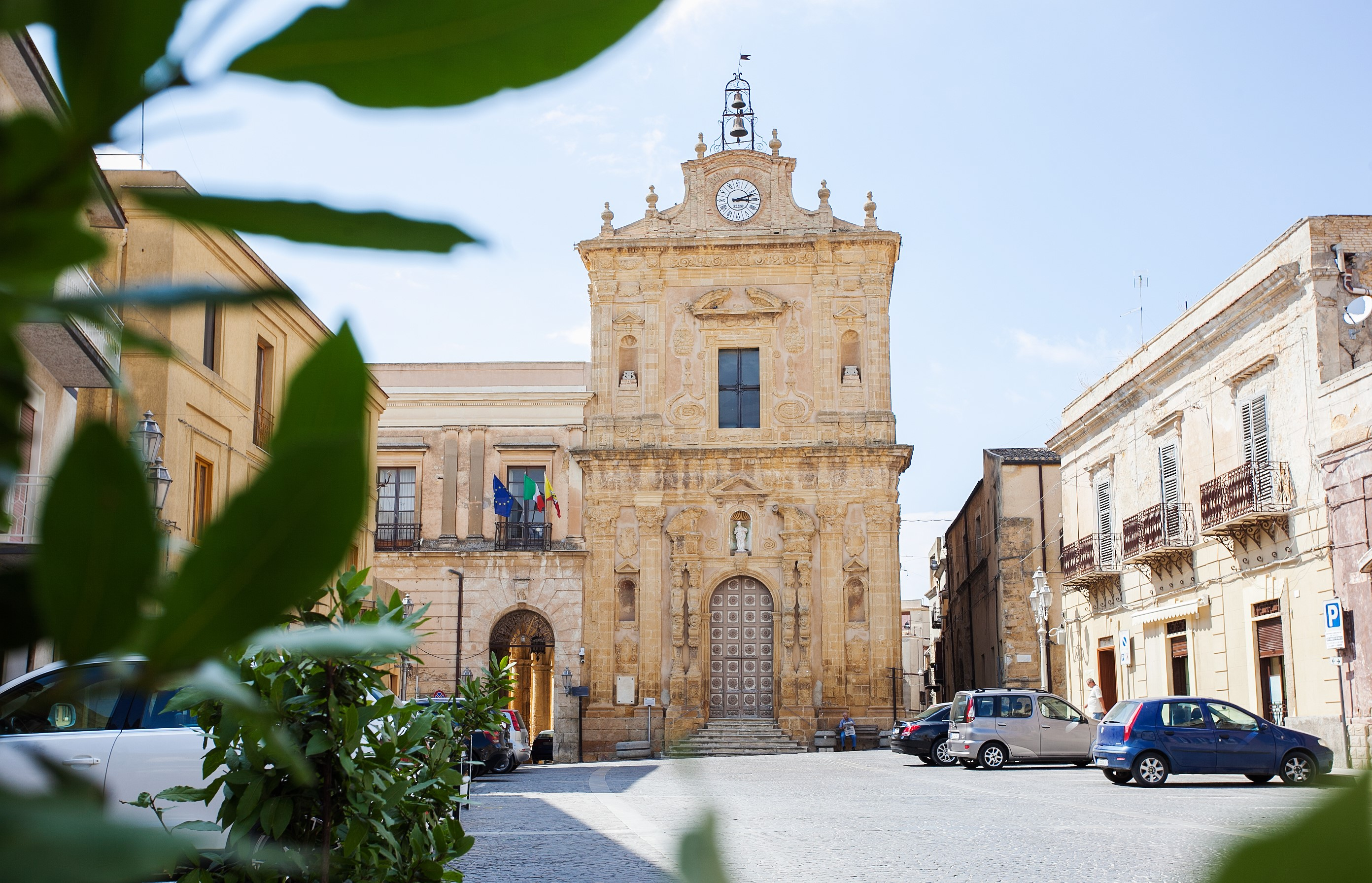
- View from the castle

- Location within Italy Location within Sicily
- Coordinates: 37°17′46.67″N 13°47′29.871″E
- Country: Italy
- Region: Sicily
- Province: Agrigento (AG)

Area
  - Total: 207 km^{2} (80 sq mi)
- Elevation: 600 m (2,000 ft)

Population (January 01, 2022)
  - Total: 6,977
  - Density: 33.7/km^{2} (87.3/sq mi)
- Demonym: Naresi
- Time zone: UTC+1 (CET)
  - Summer (DST): UTC+2 (CEST)
- Postal code: 92028
- Dialing code: 0922
- Patron saint: San Calogero
- Saint day: June 18
- Website: Official website

Naro (Sicilian: Naru [ˈnaːɾʊ]) is a comune in the province of Agrigento, on the island of Sicily, Italy. It is bounded by the comuni of Agrigento, Caltanissetta, Camastra, Campobello di Licata, Canicattì, Castrofilippo, Delia, Favara, Licata, Palma di Montechiaro, Ravanusa and Sommatino. The naturalised French composer Achille Campisiano (1837–1901) was born in this village. It is also the birthplace of Il Volo singer Piero Barone.

== History ==
There was already a settlement in the area of Naro in the Roman era, of which remains such as catacombs and ruins of Roman villas have been found. It was an important fortified town during the Arab and Norman occupation and remained a regional centre. The medieval castle, the ruined Norman church and several baroque buildings testify to its rich history.

In the Second World War, Naro was damaged by aerial bombing.

Naro is famous for the festival of its local patron saint, San Calogero, which is celebrated on June 18. On this day, a statue of the Saint is carried through the city streets in a procession with many participants.
