= Casteltermini =

- Comune
- Comune di Casteltermini
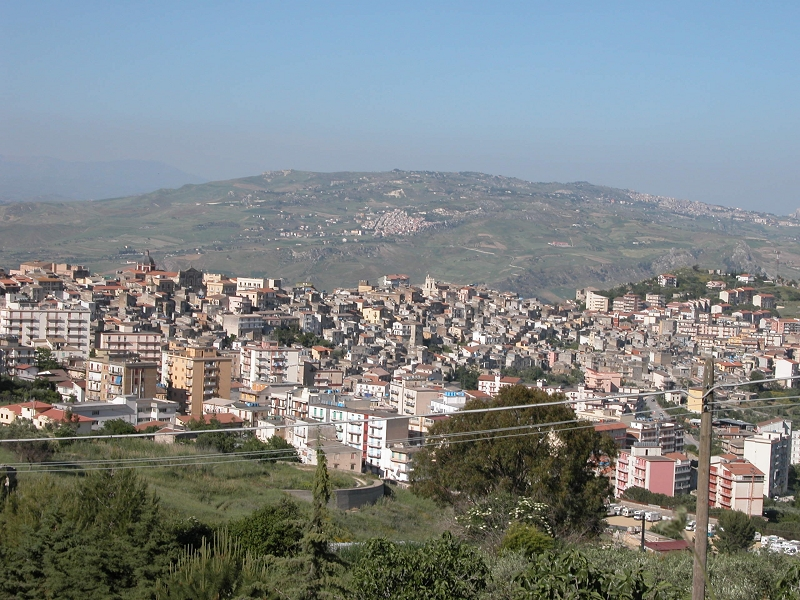
- View of Casteltermini

- Location within Italy Location within Sicily
- Coordinates: 37°32′30″N 13°39′43″E
- Country: Italy
- Region: Sicily
- Province: Agrigento (AG)

Government
  - Mayor: Gioacchino Nicastro

Area
  - Total: 99.98 km^{2} (38.60 sq mi)
- Elevation: 555 m (1,821 ft)

Population (31 December 2017)
  - Total: 7,976
  - Density: 79.78/km^{2} (206.6/sq mi)
- Demonym: Castelterminesi
- Time zone: UTC+1 (CET)
  - Summer (DST): UTC+2 (CEST)
- Postal code: 92025
- Dialing code: 0922
- Patron saint: St. Vincent Ferrer
- Saint day: April 5
- Website: Official website

Casteltermini is a comune (municipality) in the Province of Agrigento in the Italian region Sicily, located about 70 kilometres (43 mi) southeast of Palermo and about 25 kilometres (16 mi) north of Agrigento.

Casteltermini borders the following municipalities: Acquaviva Platani, Aragona, Cammarata, Campofranco, San Biagio Platani, Sant'Angelo Muxaro, Santo Stefano Quisquina, Sutera.

== History ==
Casteltermini was founded in 1629 by the local noble Gian Vincenzo Maria Termini e Ferreri, hence the name.

Casteltermini is noted for its extensive mines of rock salt and sulphur.

== Demographics ==
Historical population

Year	Pop.	±%
1861	7,549	—
1871	8,194	+8.5%
1881	9,275	+13.2%
1901	13,022	+40.4%
1911	15,092	+15.9%
1921	17,116	+13.4%
1931	11,786	−31.1%
1936	12,256	+4.0%

Year	Pop.	±%
1951	13,766	+12.3%
1961	12,464	−9.5%
1971	10,555	−15.3%
1981	10,380	−1.7%
1991	10,132	−2.4%
2001	8,782	−13.3%
2011	8,422	−4.1%
2021	7,384	−12.3%

Source: ISTAT

== Main sights ==
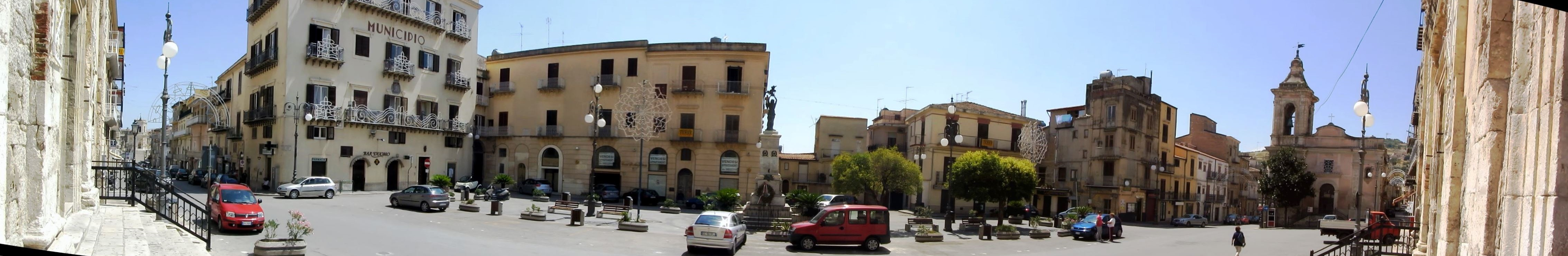
Panoramic view of the city center.

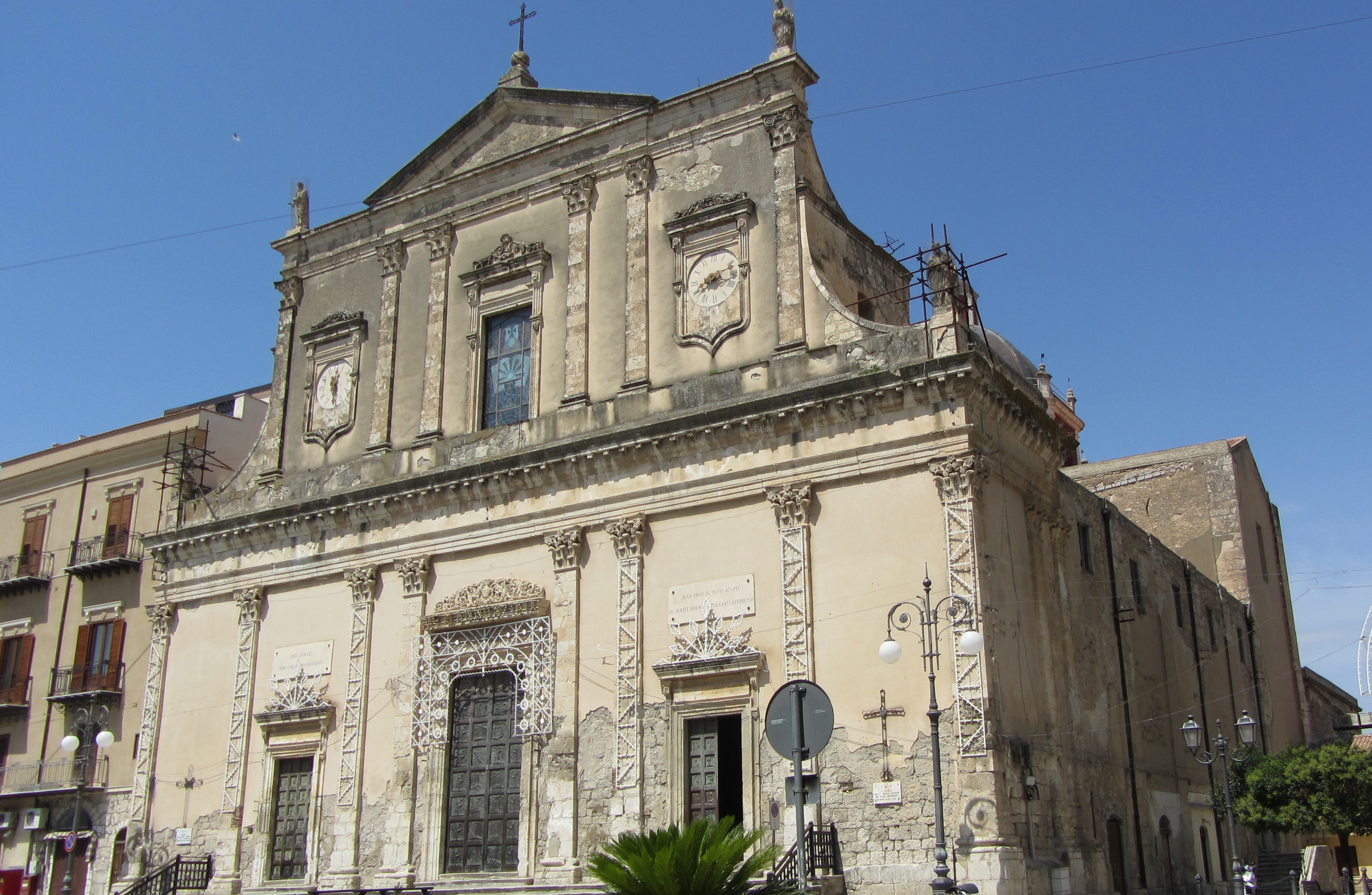
Chiesa Madre ("Mother Church").

- Chiesa Madre - "Mother Church"
- Church of San Giuseppe
- Hermitage of Santa Croce
- Church of Madonna del Carmelo
- Church of Jesus and Mary
- Antiquarium
- Ethnographic Museum
- Memorial of World War I and II Veterans, located in the city center in front of the Chiesa Madre. The names on the upper half represent the veterans of World War I. The names listed on the lower half represent the names of veterans from WW2.

== Twin towns ==
- Châtelet, Belgium

== Notable people ==
- Niccolò Cacciatore (1770-1841), astronomer
- Michele Caltagirone (1854-1928), sculptor
