= Alessio di Giovanni =

Italian poet and writer (1872–1946)

Alessio di Giovanni (Cianciana, 11 October 1872 – Palermo, 6 December 1946) was an Italian poet, novelist, and playwright. Much of his work is in Sicilian.

== Early life ==
di Giovanni was born in the Cianciana in the province of Agrigento on October 11, 1872 to parents Gaetano di Giovanni and Filippa Guida. His father owned a large holding of the countryside around Cianciana including several sulfur mines. Di Giovanni's later poetic works were influenced by the rugged mountains and isolated fields of the Platani Valley in which his birthplace of Cianciana can be found. His father, in those years, was elected mayor of Cianciana for three consecutive terms, from 1876 to 1884 . Alessio then spent his childhood in the small town of Agrigento, attending elementary schools from 1878 to 1884. At age 12 he moved with his family to Palermo, Sicily.

== Career works ==
=== Stories ===
- Popular songs from Agrigento, Noto, Zammit, 1894.
- ' Ntra l'aira, Catania, 22 November 1896.
- Maju sicilianu, Naples, Chiurazzi, 1896.
- Lu fattu di Bbissana, Naples, 1900.
- Fattuzzi razziusi, Naples, 1900.
- A lu passu di Girgenti, Catania, 1902.
- Lu cuntu di lu patruni, Palermo, June 1901.
- Saccular clouds, November 29, 1903.
- La minnitta, December 8, 1903.
- Return amaru, December 20, 1903.
- In the Valplàtani, Palermo, 1904.
- Cristu, Palermo, 1906.
- Za Francischedda, Palermo, June 3, 1910.
- Nini's pantry from la zurfara, Palermo, 1910.

=== Poems ===
- ' Nfernu veru, Naples, Chiurazzi, 1899.
- Lu puvireddu amurusu, Palermo, 1906.
- Father Luca's poem, Palermo-Milan, 1935.
- The seat cu li vrazza, Palermo, 1911.
- Vènnari di marzu, Palermo, 1911.
- Voices of the feud, Palermo, 1938.

=== Novels ===
- The deaths of lu Patriarca, Palermo, 1920.
- The racina of Sant'Antoni, Catania, 1939.
- Lu saracinu, Palermo, 1980.

=== Articles ===
- Story of a woman, Sicilian Chronicle, Terranova di Sicilia, April 10, 1889.
- For a popular poet, Popular illustration, Milan, February 15, 1889.
- Na dumanna to Turiddu Mamu, La Patria, 15 September 1889.
- Art at the Exhibition, Friend of the people, Palermo, January 7, 1892.
- For the lamp of the Madonna, Corriere di Palermo, Palermo, July 1892.
- The inventor of phonographs, La fenice, Girgenti, 4 September 1898.
- On the sacred Verna, Gazzetta di Messina and Calabria, Messina 26 May 1904.
- Holy week in Valplatani, January–February 1907.
- The seat cu li vrazza, Corriere di Sicilia, Palermo, February 12, 1911.
- Vennari of March, Corriere di Sicilia, 11 April 1911.
- Our articles in Felibre, Corriere di Sicilia, Palermo, 12 May 1911.
- In the field of felibri, Corriere di Sicilia, Palermo, 27 February et seq. 1911.
- From felibri, Il Solco, Palermo, January 1912.
- A poet priest and a chivalrous brigand, Corriere di Sicilia, Palermo, 1912.

=== Essays ===
- Saru Platania and dialectal poetry in Sicily, Naples, 1896.
- Peasants from Valdelsa and villagers from Realmonte, Naples, 1900.
- In Val di Noto, Sicula, Palermo, January–February 1905.
- The Modica Costume Painter, May–June 1905.
- The poetry of a loner, Palermo, Coop. Tip. Sicilian, 1913.
- The art of Giovanni Verga, Palermo, 1920.
- The Franciscan dream, Assisi, 1922.
- The Sicilian dialect in the work of Verga, Siciliana, Catania, January 1923.
- The dialect and the language, Palermo, 1924.
- The modernity of the Franciscan ideal, The Tradition, Palermo, 1928.
- Verga and the felibrige, Studies by Verga, Palermo, 1929.
- Priests and Franciscans of Sicily in the Garibaldi Epic of 1860, Palermo, 1932.
- The Life and Work of Giovanni Meli, Florence, 1934.

=== Theatrical works ===
- Scunciuru, Noto, Orecchia, 1895.
- Gabrieli lu Carusu, Palermo, Maraffa Abate, 1910.
- The Last Sicilians, Catania, 1932.
- Sicilian theater, collection, Catania, 1932.

=== Translations ===
- G. Pascoli, Abandoned, November 3, 1903.
- G. Roumanille, Provençal tales, Palermo, 1913.
- T. Aubanel, The Virgins of Avignon, Milan, 1914.
- M. Jouveau, Image Flourentin, Avignon, 1921.
- The Fioretti di San Francesco, Palermo, 1926.
- A. Pisaneschi, The voices of the mountain, Pistoia, Grazzini, 1926.
- G. Verdaguer, The poem of St. Francis, Assisi, 1927.
- G. Jorgensen, Olivae Fructus, Florence, 1929.
