= Campobello di Licata =

Campobello di Licata Campubbeddu (Sicilian)
- Comune
- Comune di Campobello di Licata
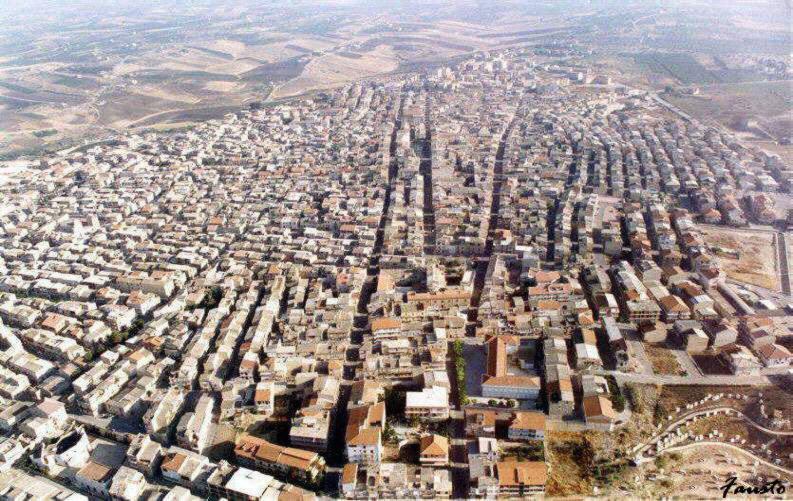
- View of Campobello di Licata

- Coat of arms

- Location within Italy Location within Sicily
- Coordinates: 37°15′N 13°55′E
- Country: Italy
- Region: Sicily
- Province: Agrigento (AG)

Government
  - Mayor: Giovanni Picone

Area
  - Total: 80.9 km^{2} (31.2 sq mi)
- Elevation: 316 m (1,037 ft)

Population (1 January 2016)
  - Total: 10,092
  - Density: 125/km^{2} (323/sq mi)
- Demonym: Campobellesi
- Time zone: UTC+1 (CET)
  - Summer (DST): UTC+2 (CEST)
- Postal code: 92023
- Dialing code: 0922
- Website: Official website

Campobello di Licata (Sicilian: Campubbeddu) is a comune (municipality) in the Province of Agrigento in the Italian region Sicily, located about 110 kilometres (68 mi) southeast of Palermo and about 30 kilometres (19 mi) east of Agrigento.

== Physical geography ==
=== Territory ===
Campobello di Licata is a hilly town in the province of Agrigento, located on a plateau of the Salso river valley at 316 m above sea level. The territory, which has an extension of about 80 km², borders with Ravanusa, Naro and Licata; the resident population is 9,616 inhabitants; it is 51 km from the provincial capital.

Its borders are delimited to the west by the Canale torrent and to the east by the Milici torrent. Furthermore, Campobello di Licata is only 4 km from Ravanusa.

== History ==
In the 11th century, the Castello di Bifar was built in Campobello di Licata. It was destroyed in the earthquake of 1693.

=== Contemporary Age ===
Important public works are from the end of the 19th century, mainly by the mayor Salvatore Ciotta: drinking water fountains, library, municipal band, school classrooms, petroleum lighting, the facade of the mother church, the municipal clock, the pavements of the streets, the cemetery and the municipal villa.

In 1980 a major restructuring of the town began in Campobello di Licata, monuments were created by the Argentine artist Silvio Benedetto and services and structures of a modern town with a coherent and stylistically unitary vision.

=== Symbols ===
The coat of arms and the banner of the municipality of Campobello di Licata were granted with the royal decree of 12 March 1931.

== Geography ==
Campobello di Licata borders the following municipalities: Licata, Naro, Ravanusa and Canicattì.
