= Delia, Sicily =

Delia
- Comune
- Comune di Delia
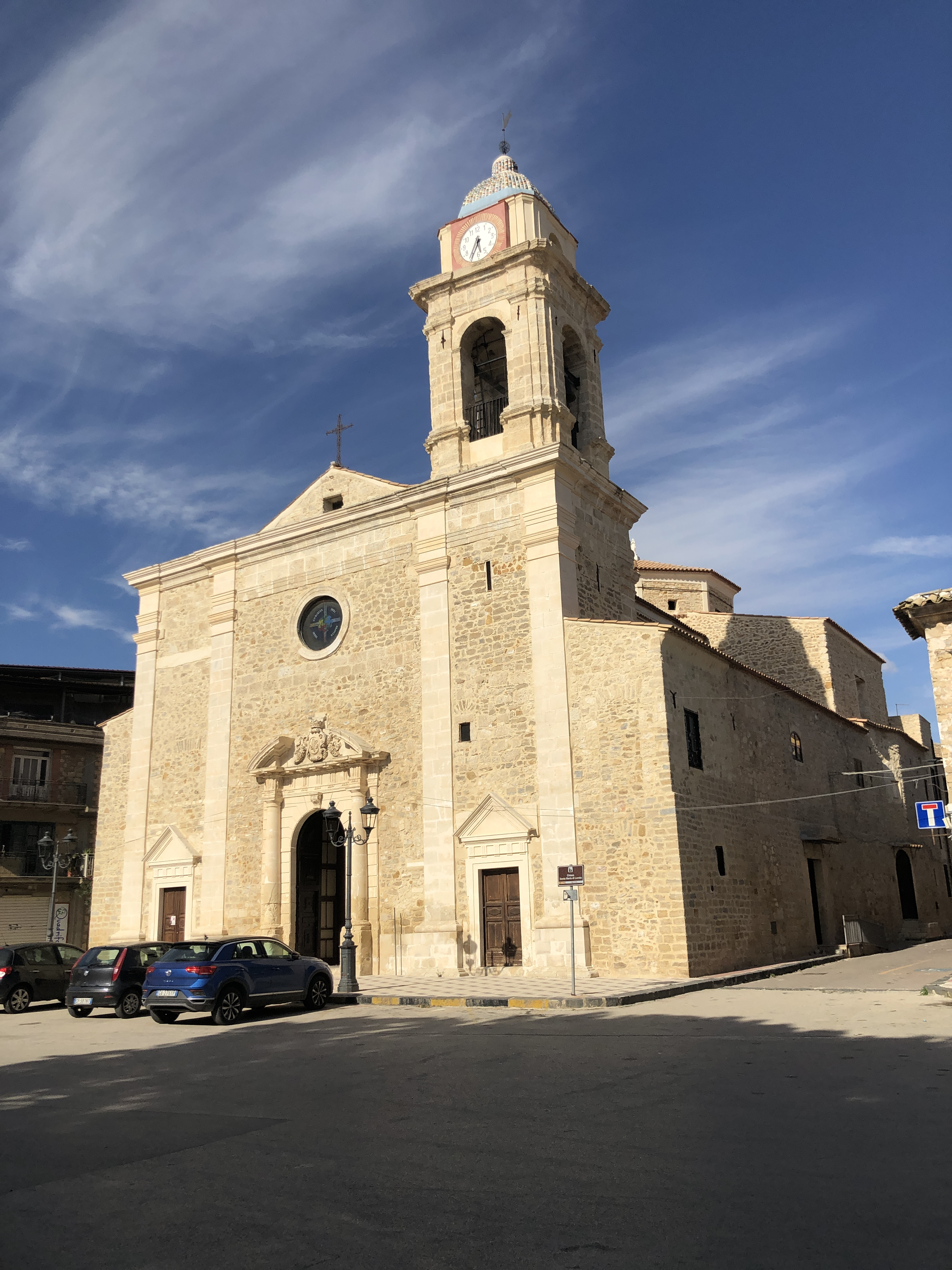
- Church of Santa Maria di Loreto

- Location within Italy Location within Sicily
- Coordinates: 37°21′N 13°56′E
- Country: Italy
- Region: Sicily
- Province: Province of Caltanissetta (CL)

Area
  - Total: 12.3 km^{2} (4.7 sq mi)
- Elevation: 420 m (1,380 ft)

Population (Dec. 2004)
  - Total: 4,486
  - Density: 365/km^{2} (945/sq mi)
- Demonym: Deliani
- Time zone: UTC+1 (CET)
  - Summer (DST): UTC+2 (CEST)
- Postal code: 93010
- Dialing code: 0922
- Website: Official website

Delia (also Sicilian: La Dilia) is a municipality (comune, cumune) in the province of Caltanissetta in the Italian region Sicily, located about 100 kilometres (62 mi) southeast of Palermo and about 20 kilometres (12 mi) southwest of Caltanissetta. As of 31 December 2004, it had a population of 4,486 and an area of 12.3 square kilometres (4.7 mi^{2}).

Delia borders the following municipalities: Caltanissetta, Canicattì, Naro.

== Demographic evolution ==
Historical population

Year	Pop.	±%
1861	3,525	—
1871	3,664	+3.9%
1881	3,919	+7.0%
1901	4,705	+20.1%
1911	5,311	+12.9%

Year	Pop.	±%
1921	5,620	+5.8%
1931	6,527	+16.1%
1936	6,428	−1.5%
1951	7,250	+12.8%
1961	6,673	−8.0%

Year	Pop.	±%
1971	5,122	−23.2%
1981	4,855	−5.2%
1991	4,537	−6.5%
2001	4,350	−4.1%

Source: Data from ISTAT

== Twin City ==
- Vaughan, Ontario, Canada
