= Sommatino =

- Comune
- Comune di Sommatino
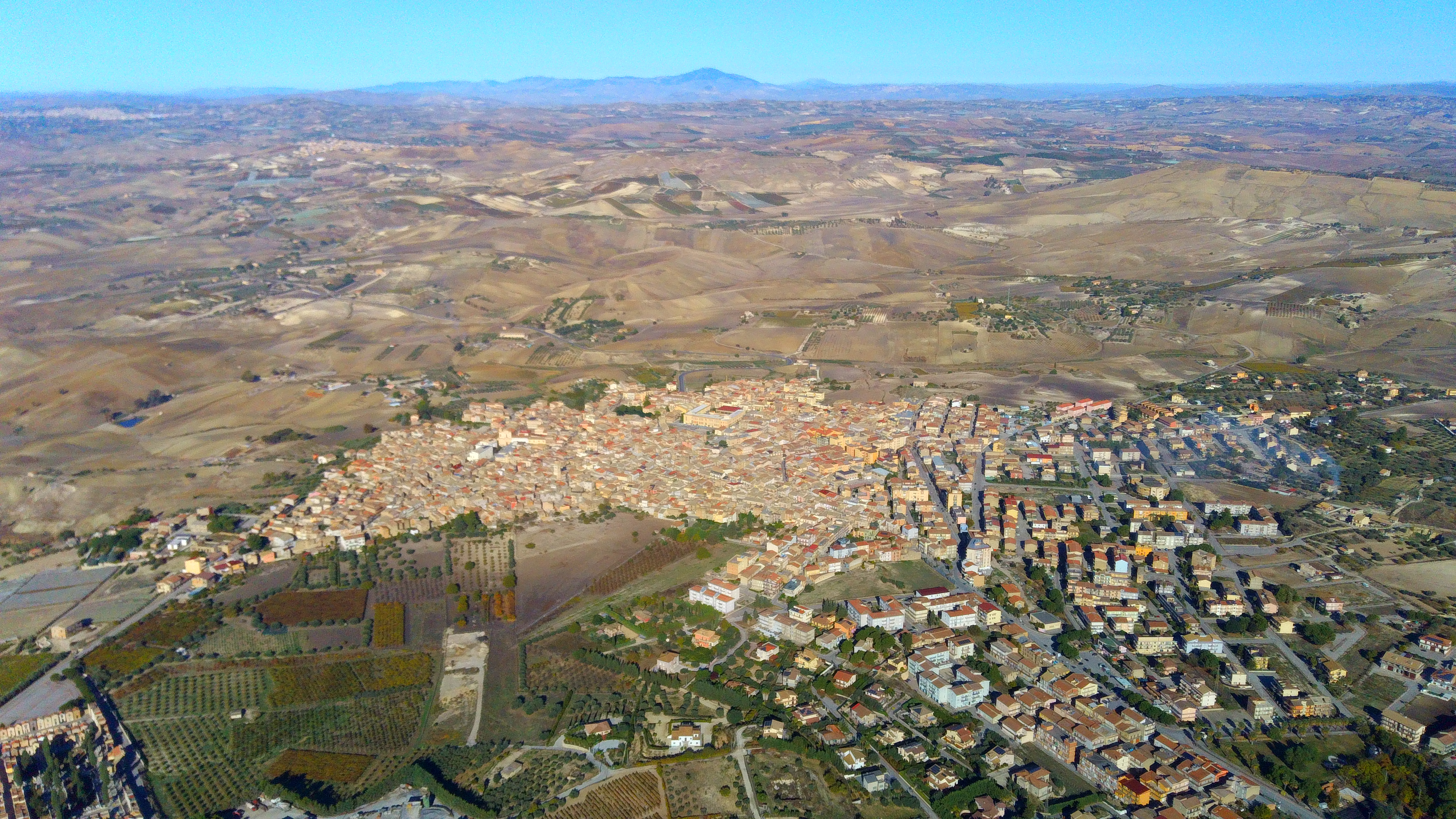
- Aerial view of Sommatino

- Coat of arms

- Location within Italy Location within Sicily
- Coordinates: 37°20′N 14°0′E
- Country: Italy
- Region: Sicily
- Province: Caltanissetta (CL)

Government
  - Mayor: Salvatore Letizia

Area
  - Total: 34.7 km^{2} (13.4 sq mi)
- Elevation: 359 m (1,178 ft)

Population (30 November 2012)
  - Total: 7,263
  - Density: 209/km^{2} (542/sq mi)
- Demonym: Sommatinesi
- Time zone: UTC+1 (CET)
  - Summer (DST): UTC+2 (CEST)
- Postal code: 93019
- Dialing code: 0922
- Website: Official website

Sommatino (Italian pronunciation: [sommaˈtino]; Sicilian: Summatinu, [summaˈtɪnu]) is a town (municipality) in the Province of Caltanissetta in the Italian region Sicily, located about 100 kilometres (62 mi) southeast of Palermo and about 20 kilometres (12 mi) southwest of Caltanissetta.

== Economy ==
Until the early 1990s the economy of Sommatino relied heavily on sulphur extraction but with the advent of new technologies in this field the mines has been closed. The economy was based principally on agriculture, craftmanship and the service industries. However, these sectors are not enough to employ all the town's people and Sommatino is experiencing emigration to northern Italy, France and Germany.

== Twin towns ==
- Fontaine, France
