= Campofranco =

Municipality in Sicily, Italy

- Comune
- Comune di Campofranco
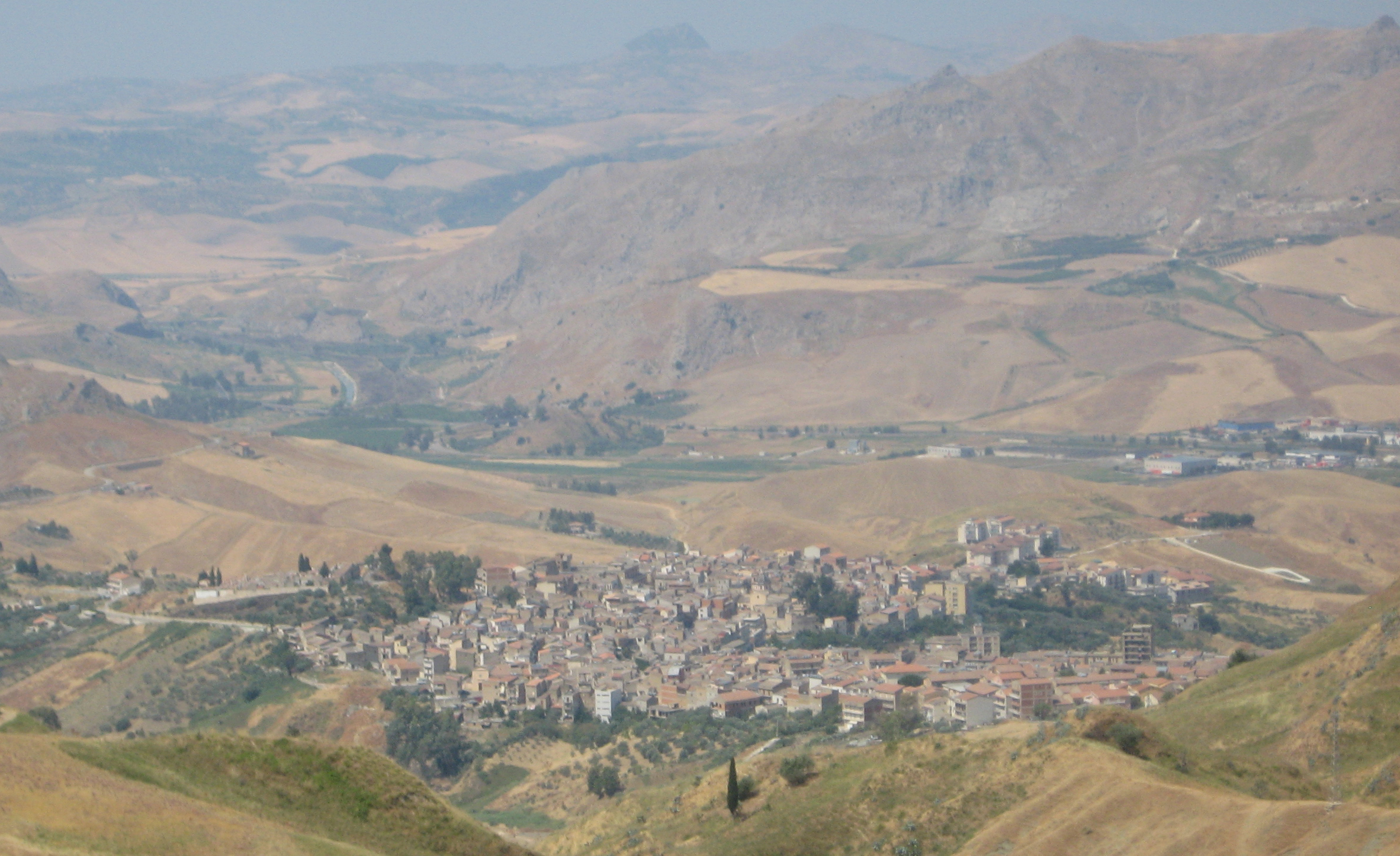

- Location within Italy Location within Sicily
- Coordinates: 37°31′N 13°42′E
- Country: Italy
- Region: Sicily
- Province: Caltanissetta (CL)

Government
  - Mayor: Rosario Pitanza

Area
  - Total: 83.97 km^{2} (32.42 sq mi)
- Elevation: 350 m (1,150 ft)

Population (30 April 2017)
  - Total: 3,032
  - Density: 36.11/km^{2} (93.52/sq mi)
- Demonym: Campofranchesi
- Time zone: UTC+1 (CET)
  - Summer (DST): UTC+2 (CEST)
- Postal code: 93010
- Dialing code: 0934
- Patron saint: Saint Calogerus
- Website: Official website

Campofranco (Campufrancu in Sicilian) is a municipality (Italian: comune) in the Province of Caltanissetta in the Italian region of Sicily, located about 70 kilometres (43 mi) southeast of Palermo and about 35 km (22 mi) west of Caltanissetta.

Campofranco borders the following municipalities: Aragona, Casteltermini, Grotte, Milena, Sutera.
