= Acquaviva Platani =

Acquaviva Platani Acquaviva Plàtani
- Comune
- Comune di Acquaviva Platani
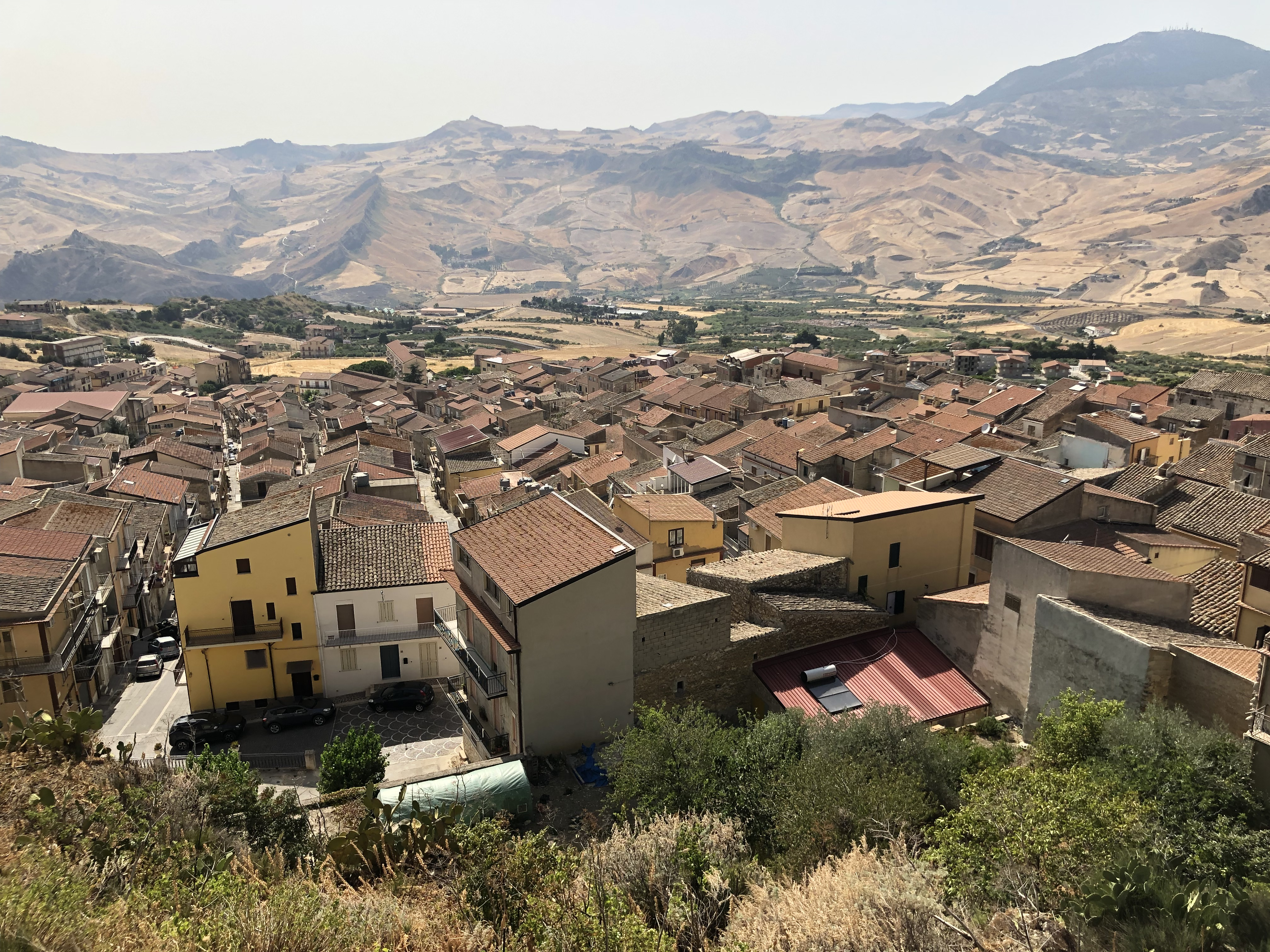
- View of the town

- Location of Acquaviva Platani in Italy Acquaviva Platani (Sicily)
- Coordinates: 37°34′N 13°42′E
- Country: Italy
- Region: Sicily
- Province: Caltanissetta (CL)

Government
  - Mayor: Salvatore Caruso (since 2022)

Area
  - Total: 14 km^{2} (5.4 sq mi)
- Elevation: 558 m (1,831 ft)

Population (24 May 2024)
  - Total: 858
  - Density: 61/km^{2} (160/sq mi)
- Demonym: Acquavivesi
- Time zone: UTC+1 (CET)
  - Summer (DST): UTC+2 (CEST)
- Postal code: 93010
- Dialing code: 0934
- Patron saint: Holy Crucifix
- Saint day: Third Sunday in September
- Website: Official website

Acquaviva Platani (Sicilian: Acquaviva Plàtani) is a hill town and comune in the province of Caltanissetta. Its territory, located along the south-north penetration route, along the valleys of the Platani.

The name of the town (meaning "Living Water" in Italian) is derived from the numerous natural springs in the area. Until 1862, the town was called simply Acquaviva; the appositive Platani was added to distinguish it from the other three Italian towns named Acquaviva. Platani is the name of the river that flows nearby.

The economy is based on agriculture: the production of wheat, olives, almonds, and pistachios are important. Also, cattle and horse breeding, along with sheep farms provide income.

Sights include the Torre dell'Orologio (clock tower) that was built in 1894, and the 17th century Chiesa Madre (Mother Church), dedicated to Santa Maria della Luce.

Salvatore Quasimodo, who spent part of his childhood at Acquaviva Platani, writes about the town in his poem "Che vuoi pastore d'aria?", which was included in the Nuove Poesie collection.
