= List of municipalities of Sicily =

Location of Sicily within Italy

Provinces of Sicily

This is a list of the municipalities (comuni) of the autonomous region of Sicily in Italy.

There are 391 municipalities in Sicily as of 2026:

- 43 in the Province of Agrigento
- 22 in the Province of Caltanissetta
- 58 in the Metropolitan City of Catania
- 20 in the Province of Enna
- 108 in the Metropolitan City of Messina
- 82 in the Metropolitan City of Palermo
- 12 in the Province of Ragusa
- 21 in the Province of Syracuse
- 25 in the Province of Trapani

== List ==
Municipality	Province	Population (2026)	Area (km²)	Density
Acate	Ragusa	10,657	102.47	104.0
Aci Bonaccorsi	Catania	3,559	1.72	2,069.2
Aci Castello	Catania	17,482	8.71	2,007.1
Aci Catena	Catania	27,349	8.53	3,206.2
Aci Sant'Antonio	Catania	18,091	14.33	1,262.5
Acireale	Catania	50,528	40.43	1,249.8
Acquaviva Platani	Caltanissetta	819	14.63	56.0
Acquedolci	Messina	5,532	12.93	427.8
Adrano	Catania	33,506	83.22	402.6
Agira	Enna	7,529	164.08	45.9
Agrigento	Agrigento	55,118	245.32	224.7
Aidone	Enna	4,205	210.78	19.9
Alcamo	Trapani	44,661	130.90	341.2
Alcara Li Fusi	Messina	1,589	62.94	25.2
Alessandria della Rocca	Agrigento	2,301	62.24	37.0
Alì	Messina	596	15.94	37.4
Alì Terme	Messina	2,317	6.27	369.5
Alia	Palermo	3,138	45.98	68.2
Alimena	Palermo	1,822	59.70	30.5
Aliminusa	Palermo	1,005	13.68	73.5
Altavilla Milicia	Palermo	9,055	23.78	380.8
Altofonte	Palermo	9,742	35.44	274.9
Antillo	Messina	773	43.64	17.7
Aragona	Agrigento	8,669	74.70	116.1
Assoro	Enna	4,749	112.15	42.3
Augusta	Syracuse	34,697	111.16	312.1
Avola	Syracuse	30,683	74.59	411.4
Bagheria	Palermo	53,152	29.84	1,781.2
Balestrate	Palermo	6,379	6.43	992.1
Barcellona Pozzo di Gotto	Messina	39,756	59.14	672.2
Barrafranca	Enna	11,456	53.71	213.3
Basicò	Messina	614	12.07	50.9
Baucina	Palermo	1,838	24.47	75.1
Belmonte Mezzagno	Palermo	10,678	29.29	364.6
Belpasso	Catania	28,321	166.33	170.3
Biancavilla	Catania	22,917	70.28	326.1
Bisacquino	Palermo	3,938	64.97	60.6
Bivona	Agrigento	3,000	88.57	33.9
Blufi	Palermo	822	21.98	37.4
Bolognetta	Palermo	4,074	27.63	147.4
Bompensiere	Caltanissetta	468	19.95	23.5
Bompietro	Palermo	1,140	42.41	26.9
Borgetto	Palermo	7,167	26.02	275.4
Brolo	Messina	5,712	7.66	745.7
Bronte	Catania	18,101	250.86	72.2
Buccheri	Syracuse	1,692	57.83	29.3
Burgio	Agrigento	2,409	42.23	57.0
Buscemi	Syracuse	935	52.05	18.0
Buseto Palizzolo	Trapani	2,727	72.81	37.5
Butera	Caltanissetta	4,053	298.55	13.6
Caccamo	Palermo	7,529	188.23	40.0
Calamonaci	Agrigento	1,127	32.89	34.3
Calascibetta	Enna	3,948	89.12	44.3
Calatabiano	Catania	5,145	26.42	194.7
Calatafimi-Segesta	Trapani	5,955	154.86	38.5
Caltabellotta	Agrigento	3,065	124.09	24.7
Caltagirone	Catania	35,373	383.38	92.3
Caltanissetta	Caltanissetta	57,922	421.25	137.5
Caltavuturo	Palermo	3,323	97.95	33.9
Camastra	Agrigento	1,973	16.32	120.9
Cammarata	Agrigento	5,801	192.46	30.1
Campobello di Licata	Agrigento	8,873	81.33	109.1
Campobello di Mazara	Trapani	11,121	65.83	168.9
Campofelice di Fitalia	Palermo	411	35.46	11.6
Campofelice di Roccella	Palermo	7,870	14.51	542.4
Campofiorito	Palermo	1,113	21.70	51.3
Campofranco	Caltanissetta	2,512	36.11	69.6
Camporeale	Palermo	2,842	38.72	73.4
Camporotondo Etneo	Catania	5,208	6.55	795.1
Canicattì	Agrigento	34,249	91.86	372.8
Canicattini Bagni	Syracuse	6,482	15.06	430.4
Capaci	Palermo	11,482	6.12	1,876.1
Capizzi	Messina	2,707	70.17	38.6
Capo d'Orlando	Messina	13,065	14.43	905.4
Capri Leone	Messina	4,401	6.76	651.0
Carini	Palermo	41,134	76.60	537.0
Carlentini	Syracuse	16,883	158.91	106.2
Caronia	Messina	2,917	227.26	12.8
Casalvecchio Siculo	Messina	675	33.62	20.1
Cassaro	Syracuse	721	19.62	36.7
Castel di Iudica	Catania	4,163	103.21	40.3
Castel di Lucio	Messina	1,355	28.78	47.1
Castelbuono	Palermo	7,871	60.79	129.5
Casteldaccia	Palermo	11,778	33.92	347.2
Castell'Umberto	Messina	2,731	11.43	238.9
Castellammare del Golfo	Trapani	14,635	127.32	114.9
Castellana Sicula	Palermo	2,885	73.20	39.4
Castelmola	Messina	1,071	16.83	63.6
Casteltermini	Agrigento	7,035	99.98	70.4
Castelvetrano	Trapani	29,357	209.76	140.0
Castiglione di Sicilia	Catania	2,832	118.90	23.8
Castrofilippo	Agrigento	2,557	18.08	141.4
Castronovo di Sicilia	Palermo	2,729	201.04	13.6
Castroreale	Messina	2,231	53.07	42.0
Catania	Catania	296,984	182.90	1,623.8
Catenanuova	Enna	4,458	11.22	397.3
Cattolica Eraclea	Agrigento	3,232	62.16	52.0
Cefalà Diana	Palermo	962	9.06	106.2
Cefalù	Palermo	13,846	66.24	209.0
Centuripe	Enna	4,981	174.20	28.6
Cerami	Enna	1,867	95.05	19.6
Cerda	Palermo	4,771	43.83	108.9
Cesarò	Messina	2,060	216.93	9.5
Chiaramonte Gulfi	Ragusa	8,045	127.38	63.2
Chiusa Sclafani	Palermo	2,378	57.55	41.3
Cianciana	Agrigento	2,971	38.08	78.0
Ciminna	Palermo	3,319	56.42	58.8
Cinisi	Palermo	12,201	33.16	367.9
Collesano	Palermo	3,609	108.17	33.4
Comiso	Ragusa	30,437	65.40	465.4
Comitini	Agrigento	919	21.89	42.0
Condrò	Messina	501	5.13	97.7
Contessa Entellina	Palermo	1,437	136.48	10.5
Corleone	Palermo	10,162	229.46	44.3
Custonaci	Trapani	5,234	69.90	74.9
Delia	Caltanissetta	3,851	12.40	310.6
Enna	Enna	24,884	358.75	69.4
Erice	Trapani	25,573	47.34	540.2
Falcone	Messina	2,826	9.34	302.6
Favara	Agrigento	31,167	81.88	380.6
Favignana	Trapani	4,540	38.32	118.5
Ferla	Syracuse	2,219	24.90	89.1
Ficarazzi	Palermo	12,913	3.53	3,658.1
Ficarra	Messina	1,267	18.66	67.9
Fiumedinisi	Messina	1,250	36.69	34.1
Fiumefreddo di Sicilia	Catania	8,965	12.16	737.3
Floresta	Messina	458	31.33	14.6
Floridia	Syracuse	20,997	26.48	792.9
Fondachelli-Fantina	Messina	1,058	42.21	25.1
Forza d'Agrò	Messina	902	11.19	80.6
Francavilla di Sicilia	Messina	3,498	82.73	42.3
Francofonte	Syracuse	11,484	74.20	154.8
Frazzanò	Messina	524	7.00	74.9
Furci Siculo	Messina	3,245	17.91	181.2
Furnari	Messina	4,246	13.55	313.4
Gaggi	Messina	3,094	7.65	404.4
Gagliano Castelferrato	Enna	3,111	56.24	55.3
Galati Mamertino	Messina	2,108	39.31	53.6
Gallodoro	Messina	320	6.91	46.3
Gangi	Palermo	5,918	127.47	46.4
Gela	Caltanissetta	70,109	279.07	251.2
Geraci Siculo	Palermo	1,636	113.35	14.4
Giardinello	Palermo	2,229	12.88	173.1
Giardini-Naxos	Messina	9,437	5.29	1,783.9
Giarratana	Ragusa	2,994	43.63	68.6
Giarre	Catania	26,466	27.32	968.7
Gibellina	Trapani	3,636	46.57	78.1
Gioiosa Marea	Messina	6,686	26.48	252.5
Giuliana	Palermo	1,626	24.14	67.4
Godrano	Palermo	981	38.99	25.2
Grammichele	Catania	12,127	31.02	390.9
Graniti	Messina	1,434	10.05	142.7
Gratteri	Palermo	853	38.17	22.3
Gravina di Catania	Catania	25,330	5.15	4,918.4
Grotte	Agrigento	5,044	23.98	210.3
Gualtieri Sicaminò	Messina	1,508	14.38	104.9
Isnello	Palermo	1,393	51.00	27.3
Isola delle Femmine	Palermo	6,963	3.57	1,950.4
Ispica	Ragusa	16,706	113.75	146.9
Itala	Messina	1,491	10.98	135.8
Joppolo Giancaxio	Agrigento	1,064	19.14	55.6
Lampedusa e Linosa	Agrigento	6,485	25.22	257.1
Lascari	Palermo	3,769	10.33	364.9
Leni	Messina	669	8.79	76.1
Lentini	Syracuse	21,022	216.78	97.0
Leonforte	Enna	12,023	84.39	142.5
Lercara Friddi	Palermo	6,042	37.43	161.4
Letojanni	Messina	2,979	6.72	443.3
Librizzi	Messina	1,535	23.39	65.6
Licata	Agrigento	34,203	179.68	190.4
Licodia Eubea	Catania	2,762	112.45	24.6
Limina	Messina	703	9.99	70.4
Linguaglossa	Catania	4,987	60.25	82.8
Lipari	Messina	12,794	89.72	142.6
Longi	Messina	1,251	42.11	29.7
Lucca Sicula	Agrigento	1,700	18.63	91.3
Maletto	Catania	3,522	40.96	86.0
Malfa	Messina	1,003	8.74	114.8
Malvagna	Messina	575	6.71	85.7
Mandanici	Messina	468	11.85	39.5
Maniace	Catania	3,739	37.70	99.2
Marianopoli	Caltanissetta	1,505	13.07	115.1
Marineo	Palermo	5,944	33.43	177.8
Marsala	Trapani	79,521	243.26	326.9
Mascali	Catania	14,486	37.85	382.7
Mascalucia	Catania	32,124	16.28	1,973.2
Mazara del Vallo	Trapani	50,070	274.64	182.3
Mazzarino	Caltanissetta	10,567	295.59	35.7
Mazzarrà Sant'Andrea	Messina	1,405	6.69	210.0
Mazzarrone	Catania	4,010	34.78	115.3
Melilli	Syracuse	13,127	136.42	96.2
Menfi	Agrigento	11,727	113.58	103.2
Merì	Messina	2,394	1.85	1,294.1
Messina	Messina	216,458	213.75	1,012.7
Mezzojuso	Palermo	2,499	49.27	50.7
Milazzo	Messina	29,779	24.70	1,205.6
Milena	Caltanissetta	2,599	24.63	105.5
Militello in Val di Catania	Catania	6,605	62.48	105.7
Militello Rosmarino	Messina	1,168	29.54	39.5
Milo	Catania	1,017	16.67	61.0
Mineo	Catania	4,345	246.32	17.6
Mirabella Imbaccari	Catania	4,132	15.30	270.1
Mirto	Messina	852	9.27	91.9
Misiliscemi	Trapani	8,446	92.39	91.4
Misilmeri	Palermo	29,197	69.49	420.2
Misterbianco	Catania	48,620	37.68	1,290.3
Mistretta	Messina	4,150	127.47	32.6
Modica	Ragusa	53,622	292.37	183.4
Mojo Alcantara	Messina	679	8.60	79.0
Monforte San Giorgio	Messina	2,390	32.26	74.1
Mongiuffi Melia	Messina	506	24.36	20.8
Monreale	Palermo	38,844	530.18	73.3
Montagnareale	Messina	1,342	16.38	81.9
Montalbano Elicona	Messina	2,072	67.80	30.6
Montallegro	Agrigento	2,342	27.41	85.4
Montedoro	Caltanissetta	1,320	14.53	90.8
Montelepre	Palermo	5,653	9.89	571.6
Montemaggiore Belsito	Palermo	2,745	32.08	85.6
Monterosso Almo	Ragusa	2,705	56.55	47.8
Montevago	Agrigento	2,679	32.91	81.4
Motta Camastra	Messina	762	25.31	30.1
Motta d'Affermo	Messina	646	14.58	44.3
Motta Sant'Anastasia	Catania	12,139	35.71	339.9
Mussomeli	Caltanissetta	9,742	164.43	59.2
Naro	Agrigento	6,733	207.49	32.4
Naso	Messina	3,344	36.74	91.0
Nicolosi	Catania	7,720	42.65	181.0
Nicosia	Enna	12,382	218.51	56.7
Niscemi	Caltanissetta	24,535	96.82	253.4
Nissoria	Enna	2,781	61.83	45.0
Nizza di Sicilia	Messina	3,488	13.42	259.9
Noto	Syracuse	24,656	554.99	44.4
Novara di Sicilia	Messina	1,045	49.18	21.2
Oliveri	Messina	2,226	10.43	213.4
Pace del Mela	Messina	5,938	12.18	487.5
Paceco	Trapani	10,544	58.01	181.8
Pachino	Syracuse	22,355	50.98	438.5
Pagliara	Messina	1,100	14.48	76.0
Palagonia	Catania	15,369	57.79	265.9
Palazzo Adriano	Palermo	1,694	130.10	13.0
Palazzolo Acreide	Syracuse	7,912	87.54	90.4
Palermo	Palermo	626,273	160.59	3,899.8
Palma di Montechiaro	Agrigento	21,302	77.06	276.4
Pantelleria	Trapani	7,150	84.53	84.6
Partanna	Trapani	9,835	82.73	118.9
Partinico	Palermo	30,929	108.06	286.2
Paternò	Catania	44,502	144.68	307.6
Patti	Messina	12,721	50.08	254.0
Pedara	Catania	15,522	19.23	807.2
Petralia Soprana	Palermo	2,807	56.10	50.0
Petralia Sottana	Palermo	2,349	178.35	13.2
Petrosino	Trapani	7,883	45.28	174.1
Pettineo	Messina	1,222	30.62	39.9
Piana degli Albanesi	Palermo	5,171	64.92	79.7
Piazza Armerina	Enna	20,558	304.54	67.5
Piedimonte Etneo	Catania	3,865	26.54	145.6
Pietraperzia	Enna	6,183	118.11	52.3
Piraino	Messina	3,724	16.97	219.4
Poggioreale	Trapani	1,272	37.46	34.0
Polizzi Generosa	Palermo	2,745	134.66	20.4
Pollina	Palermo	2,807	49.93	56.2
Porto Empedocle	Agrigento	15,430	25.23	611.6
Portopalo di Capo Passero	Syracuse	3,890	15.09	257.8
Pozzallo	Ragusa	18,958	15.38	1,232.6
Priolo Gargallo	Syracuse	11,038	56.92	193.9
Prizzi	Palermo	3,999	95.04	42.1
Racalmuto	Agrigento	7,501	68.10	110.1
Raccuja	Messina	839	25.20	33.3
Raddusa	Catania	2,751	23.39	117.6
Raffadali	Agrigento	11,769	22.30	527.8
Ragalna	Catania	4,396	39.53	111.2
Ragusa	Ragusa	74,122	444.67	166.7
Ramacca	Catania	10,029	306.44	32.7
Randazzo	Catania	9,959	205.62	48.4
Ravanusa	Agrigento	10,124	49.50	204.5
Realmonte	Agrigento	4,368	20.37	214.4
Regalbuto	Enna	6,556	170.29	38.5
Reitano	Messina	705	14.12	49.9
Resuttano	Caltanissetta	1,687	38.27	44.1
Ribera	Agrigento	17,744	118.52	149.7
Riesi	Caltanissetta	10,158	67.00	151.6
Riposto	Catania	13,901	13.25	1,049.1
Roccafiorita	Messina	154	1.17	131.6
Roccalumera	Messina	4,143	8.91	465.0
Roccamena	Palermo	1,283	33.72	38.0
Roccapalumba	Palermo	2,119	31.57	67.1
Roccavaldina	Messina	965	7.13	135.3
Roccella Valdemone	Messina	532	41.15	12.9
Rodì Milici	Messina	1,938	36.55	53.0
Rometta	Messina	6,497	32.12	202.3
Rosolini	Syracuse	20,655	76.47	270.1
Salaparuta	Trapani	1,560	41.42	37.7
Salemi	Trapani	9,719	182.42	53.3
Sambuca di Sicilia	Agrigento	5,202	96.37	54.0
San Biagio Platani	Agrigento	2,744	42.67	64.3
San Cataldo	Caltanissetta	20,229	72.78	277.9
San Cipirello	Palermo	4,787	20.85	229.6
San Cono	Catania	2,363	6.63	356.4
San Filippo del Mela	Messina	6,617	10.05	658.4
San Fratello	Messina	3,159	67.63	46.7
San Giovanni Gemini	Agrigento	7,383	26.56	278.0
San Giovanni la Punta	Catania	24,458	10.85	2,254.2
San Giuseppe Jato	Palermo	7,886	29.78	264.8
San Gregorio di Catania	Catania	11,518	5.65	2,038.6
San Marco d'Alunzio	Messina	1,775	26.14	67.9
San Mauro Castelverde	Palermo	1,279	114.37	11.2
San Michele di Ganzaria	Catania	2,807	25.81	108.8
San Pier Niceto	Messina	2,518	36.68	68.6
San Piero Patti	Messina	2,535	41.82	60.6
San Pietro Clarenza	Catania	8,372	6.27	1,335.2
San Salvatore di Fitalia	Messina	1,103	15.00	73.5
San Teodoro	Messina	1,185	13.97	84.8
San Vito Lo Capo	Trapani	4,865	60.12	80.9
Sant'Agata di Militello	Messina	12,133	33.98	357.1
Sant'Agata li Battiati	Catania	9,217	3.12	2,954.2
Sant'Alessio Siculo	Messina	1,542	6.17	249.9
Sant'Alfio	Catania	1,521	25.86	58.8
Sant'Angelo di Brolo	Messina	2,625	30.39	86.4
Sant'Angelo Muxaro	Agrigento	1,119	64.52	17.3
Santa Caterina Villarmosa	Caltanissetta	4,421	75.82	58.3
Santa Cristina Gela	Palermo	1,006	38.74	26.0
Santa Croce Camerina	Ragusa	11,649	41.09	283.5
Santa Domenica Vittoria	Messina	861	20.16	42.7
Santa Elisabetta	Agrigento	2,208	16.17	136.5
Santa Flavia	Palermo	10,983	14.60	752.3
Santa Lucia del Mela	Messina	4,342	85.68	50.7
Santa Margherita di Belice	Agrigento	5,981	67.28	88.9
Santa Maria di Licodia	Catania	7,675	26.28	292.0
Santa Marina Salina	Messina	877	8.78	99.9
Santa Ninfa	Trapani	4,713	60.94	77.3
Santa Teresa di Riva	Messina	9,133	8.12	1,124.8
Santa Venerina	Catania	8,487	19.03	446.0
Santo Stefano di Camastra	Messina	4,325	21.92	197.3
Santo Stefano Quisquina	Agrigento	3,854	85.52	45.1
Saponara	Messina	3,620	26.26	137.9
Savoca	Messina	1,749	9.08	192.6
Scaletta Zanclea	Messina	1,861	4.76	391.0
Sciacca	Agrigento	38,387	191.67	200.3
Sciara	Palermo	2,424	31.19	77.7
Scicli	Ragusa	26,920	138.72	194.1
Scillato	Palermo	564	31.70	17.8
Sclafani Bagni	Palermo	344	134.90	2.6
Scordia	Catania	15,885	24.31	653.4
Serradifalco	Caltanissetta	5,342	41.94	127.4
Siculiana	Agrigento	4,187	40.99	102.1
Sinagra	Messina	2,418	24.03	100.6
Solarino	Syracuse	7,510	13.02	576.8
Sommatino	Caltanissetta	6,220	34.76	178.9
Sortino	Syracuse	7,977	93.33	85.5
Spadafora	Messina	4,602	10.52	437.5
Sperlinga	Enna	639	59.14	10.8
Sutera	Caltanissetta	1,096	35.58	30.8
Syracuse	Syracuse	115,515	207.78	555.9
Taormina	Messina	10,476	13.13	797.9
Terme Vigliatore	Messina	7,363	13.23	556.5
Termini Imerese	Palermo	24,625	78.19	314.9
Terrasini	Palermo	13,126	19.85	661.3
Torregrotta	Messina	7,283	4.13	1,763.4
Torrenova	Messina	4,483	12.93	346.7
Torretta	Palermo	4,440	25.54	173.8
Tortorici	Messina	5,432	70.50	77.0
Trabia	Palermo	10,844	20.57	527.2
Trapani	Trapani	54,636	180.74	302.3
Trappeto	Palermo	3,143	4.19	750.1
Trecastagni	Catania	11,396	19.16	594.8
Tremestieri Etneo	Catania	19,172	6.52	2,940.5
Tripi	Messina	704	54.67	12.9
Troina	Enna	8,201	168.28	48.7
Tusa	Messina	2,480	41.07	60.4
Ucria	Messina	841	26.26	32.0
Ustica	Palermo	1,323	8.24	160.6
Valderice	Trapani	11,239	52.96	212.2
Valdina	Messina	1,246	2.60	479.2
Valguarnera Caropepe	Enna	6,743	9.41	716.6
Valledolmo	Palermo	3,051	25.78	118.3
Vallelunga Pratameno	Caltanissetta	3,003	39.37	76.3
Valverde	Catania	7,810	5.52	1,414.9
Venetico	Messina	3,961	4.52	876.3
Ventimiglia di Sicilia	Palermo	1,708	26.90	63.5
Viagrande	Catania	8,943	10.09	886.3
Vicari	Palermo	2,347	86.01	27.3
Villabate	Palermo	19,380	3.80	5,100.0
Villafranca Sicula	Agrigento	1,295	17.63	73.5
Villafranca Tirrena	Messina	7,709	14.25	541.0
Villafrati	Palermo	3,064	25.64	119.5
Villalba	Caltanissetta	1,343	41.82	32.1
Villarosa	Enna	4,271	54.89	77.8
Vita	Trapani	1,710	9.10	187.9
Vittoria	Ragusa	66,329	182.48	363.5
Vizzini	Catania	5,636	126.75	44.5
Zafferana Etnea	Catania	9,341	76.87	121.5

== See also ==
- List of municipalities of Italy
