= List of municipalities of the Province of Agrigento =

The following is a list of the 43 municipalities (comuni) of the Province of Agrigento in the autonomous region of Sicily in Italy.

== List ==
Municipality	Population (2026)	Area (km²)	Density
Agrigento	55,118	245.32	224.7
Alessandria della Rocca	2,301	62.24	37.0
Aragona	8,669	74.70	116.1
Bivona	3,000	88.57	33.9
Burgio	2,409	42.23	57.0
Calamonaci	1,127	32.89	34.3
Caltabellotta	3,065	124.09	24.7
Camastra	1,973	16.32	120.9
Cammarata	5,801	192.46	30.1
Campobello di Licata	8,873	81.33	109.1
Canicattì	34,249	91.86	372.8
Casteltermini	7,035	99.98	70.4
Castrofilippo	2,557	18.08	141.4
Cattolica Eraclea	3,232	62.16	52.0
Cianciana	2,971	38.08	78.0
Comitini	919	21.89	42.0
Favara	31,167	81.88	380.6
Grotte	5,044	23.98	210.3
Joppolo Giancaxio	1,064	19.14	55.6
Lampedusa e Linosa	6,485	25.22	257.1
Licata	34,203	179.68	190.4
Lucca Sicula	1,700	18.63	91.3
Menfi	11,727	113.58	103.2
Montallegro	2,342	27.41	85.4
Montevago	2,679	32.91	81.4
Naro	6,733	207.49	32.4
Palma di Montechiaro	21,302	77.06	276.4
Porto Empedocle	15,430	25.23	611.6
Racalmuto	7,501	68.10	110.1
Raffadali	11,769	22.30	527.8
Ravanusa	10,124	49.50	204.5
Realmonte	4,368	20.37	214.4
Ribera	17,744	118.52	149.7
Sambuca di Sicilia	5,202	96.37	54.0
San Biagio Platani	2,744	42.67	64.3
San Giovanni Gemini	7,383	26.56	278.0
Sant'Angelo Muxaro	1,119	64.52	17.3
Santa Elisabetta	2,208	16.17	136.5
Santa Margherita di Belice	5,981	67.28	88.9
Santo Stefano Quisquina	3,854	85.52	45.1
Sciacca	38,387	191.67	200.3
Siculiana	4,187	40.99	102.1
Villafranca Sicula	1,295	17.63	73.5

== See also ==
- List of municipalities of Sicily
- List of municipalities of Italy
