= List of municipalities of the province of Caltanissetta =

The following is a list of the 22 municipalities (comuni) of the province of Caltanissetta in the autonomous region of Sicily in Italy.

== List ==
Municipality	Population (2026)	Area (km²)	Density
Acquaviva Platani	819	14.63	56.0
Bompensiere	468	19.95	23.5
Butera	4,053	298.55	13.6
Caltanissetta	57,922	421.25	137.5
Campofranco	2,512	36.11	69.6
Delia	3,851	12.40	310.6
Gela	70,109	279.07	251.2
Marianopoli	1,505	13.07	115.1
Mazzarino	10,567	295.59	35.7
Milena	2,599	24.63	105.5
Montedoro	1,320	14.53	90.8
Mussomeli	9,742	164.43	59.2
Niscemi	24,535	96.82	253.4
Resuttano	1,687	38.27	44.1
Riesi	10,158	67.00	151.6
San Cataldo	20,229	72.78	277.9
Santa Caterina Villarmosa	4,421	75.82	58.3
Serradifalco	5,342	41.94	127.4
Sommatino	6,220	34.76	178.9
Sutera	1,096	35.58	30.8
Vallelunga Pratameno	3,003	39.37	76.3
Villalba	1,343	41.82	32.1

== See also ==
- List of municipalities of Sicily
- List of municipalities of Italy
