= List of municipalities of the Province of Syracuse =

This is a list of the 21 municipalities (comuni) of the Province of Syracuse in the autonomous region of Sicily in Italy.

== List ==
Municipality	Population (2026)	Area (km²)	Density
Augusta	34,697	111.16	312.1
Avola	30,683	74.59	411.4
Buccheri	1,692	57.83	29.3
Buscemi	935	52.05	18.0
Canicattini Bagni	6,482	15.06	430.4
Carlentini	16,883	158.91	106.2
Cassaro	721	19.62	36.7
Ferla	2,219	24.90	89.1
Floridia	20,997	26.48	792.9
Francofonte	11,484	74.20	154.8
Lentini	21,022	216.78	97.0
Melilli	13,127	136.42	96.2
Noto	24,656	554.99	44.4
Pachino	22,355	50.98	438.5
Palazzolo Acreide	7,912	87.54	90.4
Portopalo di Capo Passero	3,890	15.09	257.8
Priolo Gargallo	11,038	56.92	193.9
Rosolini	20,655	76.47	270.1
Solarino	7,510	13.02	576.8
Sortino	7,977	93.33	85.5
Syracuse	115,515	207.78	555.9

== See also ==
- List of municipalities of Sicily
- List of municipalities of Italy
