= Milici, Italy =

Milici
- Frazione
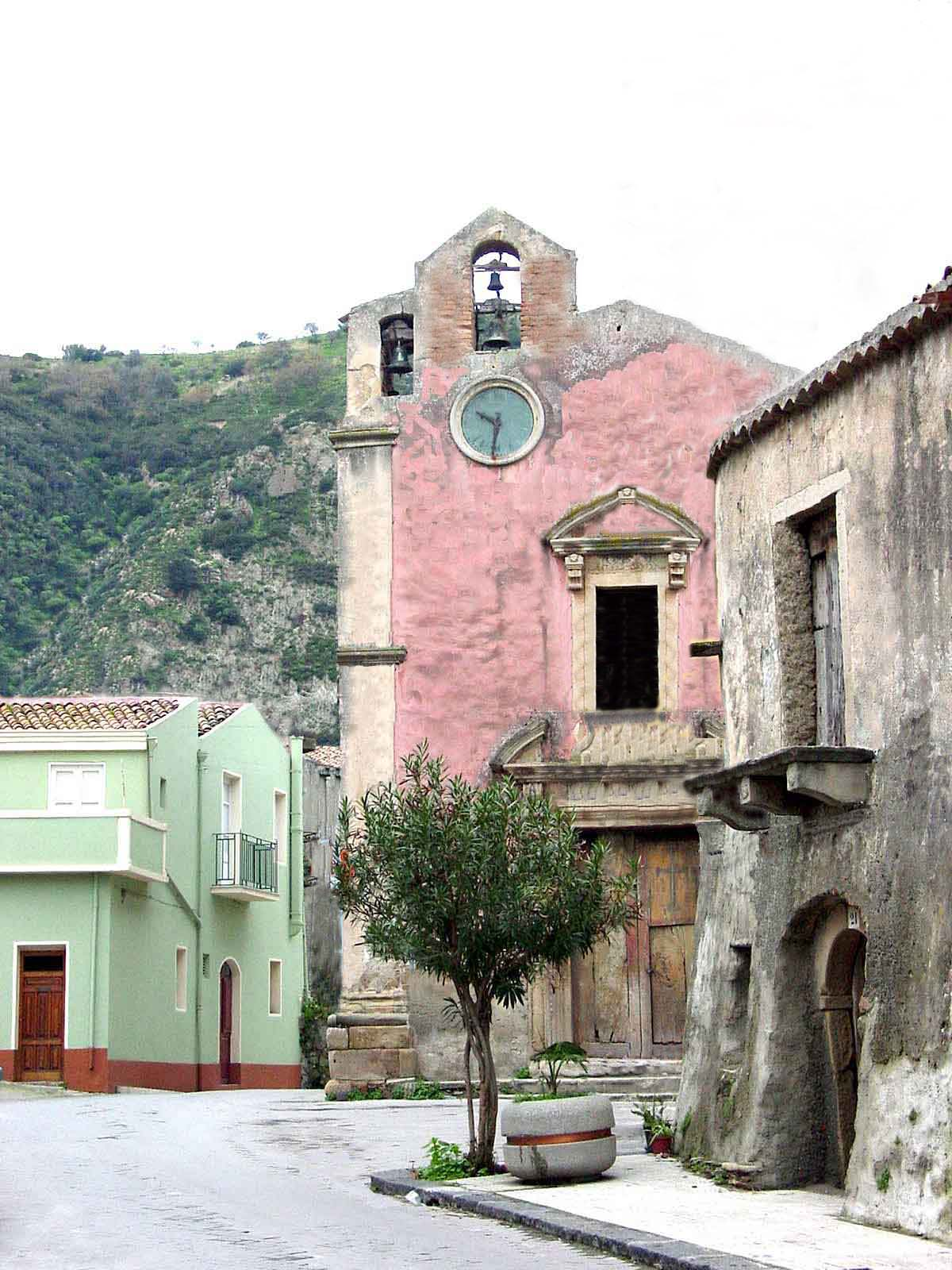
- Piazza San. Rocco

- Location of Milici in Italy
- Coordinates: 38°5′N 15°10′E
- Country: Italy
- Region: Sicily
- Province: Province of Messina (ME)
- Comune: Rodì Milici
- Elevation: 280 m (920 ft)
- Demonym: Milicioti
- Time zone: UTC+1 (CET)
  - Summer (DST): UTC+2 (CEST)
- Postal code: 98050
- Dialing code: 090

Milici is a village in the Province of Messina of Sicily, Italy.

== Geography ==
The village is located about 160 km east of Palermo and about 35 kilometres (22 mi) west of Messina. As of 31 December 2007, it had a population of 600.

The village is in the Municipality of Rodì Milici, and borders the following municipalities: Antillo, Castroreale, Fondachelli-Fantina, Mazzarrà Sant'Andrea, Novara di Sicilia, Terme Vigliatore. As to its name, it has been suggested to be derived from the Akkadian mil-, a flooding river, and –ki, a locality suffix (G. Tripodi. Some archaic toponyms of Middle Eastern origin in Western Europe. Complessità 2013, VIII p. 283). The village is indeed located close to a river of such a type, nearby an area with Bronze Age ruins.
