= Racalmuto =

Racalmuto Racalmutu (Sicilian)
- Comune
- Comune di Racalmuto
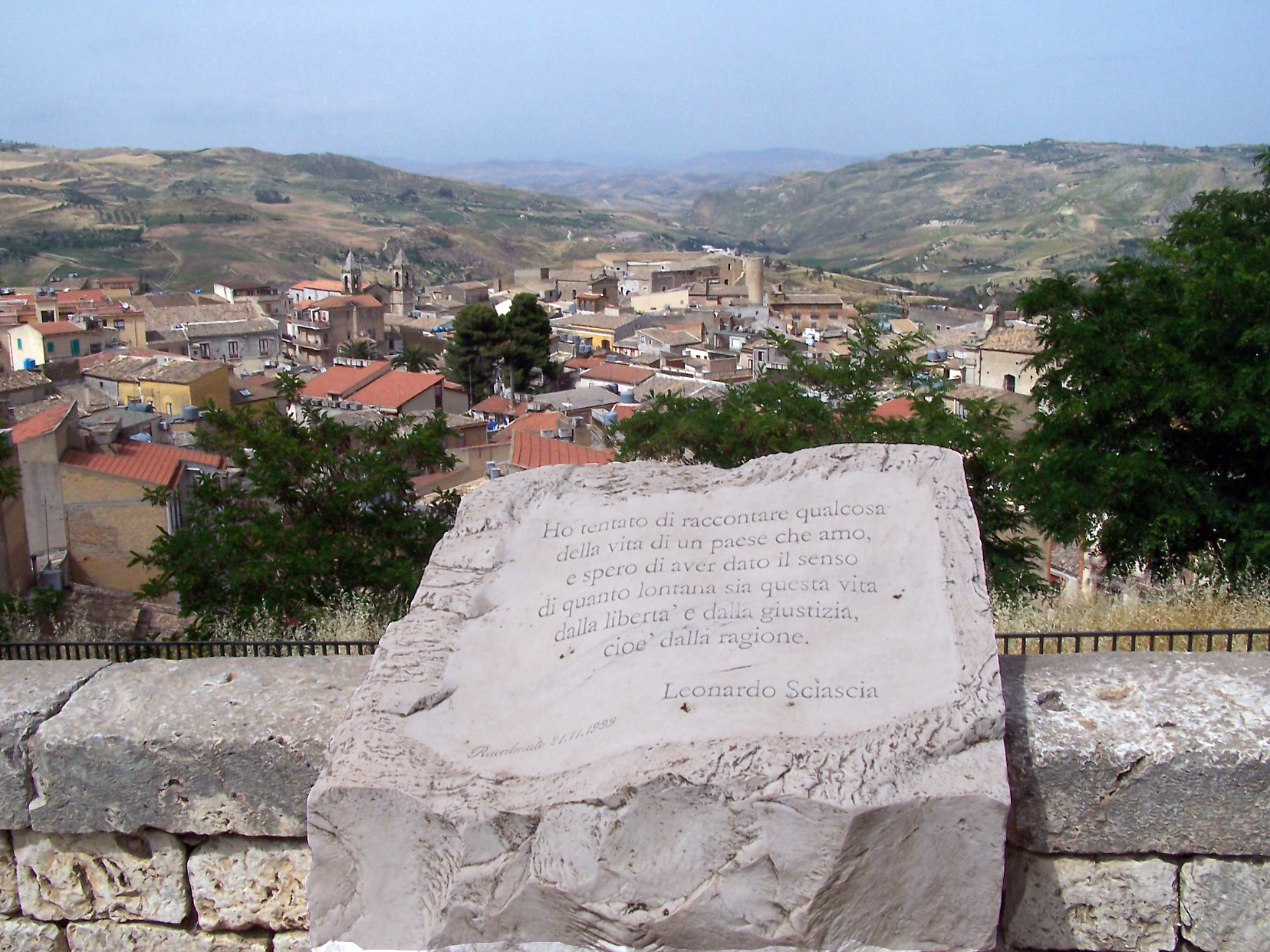
- Leonardo Sciascia's dedication to Racalmuto.

- Coat of arms

- Location within Italy Location within Sicily
- Coordinates: 37°24′N 13°44′E
- Country: Italy
- Region: Sicily
- Province: Agrigento (AG)

Government
  - Mayor: Vincenzo Maniglia

Area
  - Total: 68.3 km^{2} (26.4 sq mi)
- Elevation: 455 m (1,493 ft)

Population (28 February 2026)
  - Total: 7,505
  - Density: 110/km^{2} (285/sq mi)
- Demonym: Racalmutesi
- Time zone: UTC+1 (CET)
  - Summer (DST): UTC+2 (CEST)
- Postal code: 92020
- Dialing code: 0922
- Website: Official website

Racalmuto (Sicilian: Racalmutu) is a comune (municipality) in the Province of Agrigento in the Italian Autonomous Region of Sicily, located about 90 kilometres (56 mi) southeast of Palermo and about 15 kilometres (9 mi) northeast of Agrigento.

Racalmuto is the setting of Angelo F. Coniglio's historical fiction novella The Lady of the Wheel.

Racalmuto borders the following municipalities: Bompensiere, Canicattì, Castrofilippo, Favara, Grotte, Milena, Montedoro.

== Notable people ==
Racalmuto was the birthplace and lifelong home of author Leonardo Sciascia (1921–89) Luigi Infantino, Opera tenor Recalmuto 24 April 1921 Rome 22 June 1991

== Bibliography ==
- Leonardo Sciascia: Wine Dark Sea, 2001
- Angelo F. Coniglio: The Lady of the Wheel, 2012

== Twin towns ==
- Hamilton, Ontario, Canada
  - Murray St. in Hamilton's Little Italy is known as Corso Racalmuto, after the Racalmutesi immigrants who populated the area. Around 24,000 Hamilton residents have ties to Racalmuto.
- Finale Ligure, Italy
