= List of municipalities of the Province of Trapani =

This is a list of the 25 municipalities (comuni) of the Province of Trapani in the autonomous region of Sicily in Italy.

== List ==
Municipality	Population (2026)	Area (km²)	Density
Alcamo	44,661	130.90	341.2
Buseto Palizzolo	2,727	72.81	37.5
Calatafimi-Segesta	5,955	154.86	38.5
Campobello di Mazara	11,121	65.83	168.9
Castellammare del Golfo	14,635	127.32	114.9
Castelvetrano	29,357	209.76	140.0
Custonaci	5,234	69.90	74.9
Erice	25,573	47.34	540.2
Favignana	4,540	38.32	118.5
Gibellina	3,636	46.57	78.1
Marsala	79,521	243.26	326.9
Mazara del Vallo	50,070	274.64	182.3
Misiliscemi	8,446	92.39	91.4
Paceco	10,544	58.01	181.8
Pantelleria	7,150	84.53	84.6
Partanna	9,835	82.73	118.9
Petrosino	7,883	45.28	174.1
Poggioreale	1,272	37.46	34.0
Salaparuta	1,560	41.42	37.7
Salemi	9,719	182.42	53.3
San Vito Lo Capo	4,865	60.12	80.9
Santa Ninfa	4,713	60.94	77.3
Trapani	54,636	180.74	302.3
Valderice	11,239	52.96	212.2
Vita	1,710	9.10	187.9

== See also ==
- List of municipalities of Sicily
- List of municipalities of Italy
