= Sant'Antonino, Buscemi =

Baroque Roman Catholic church

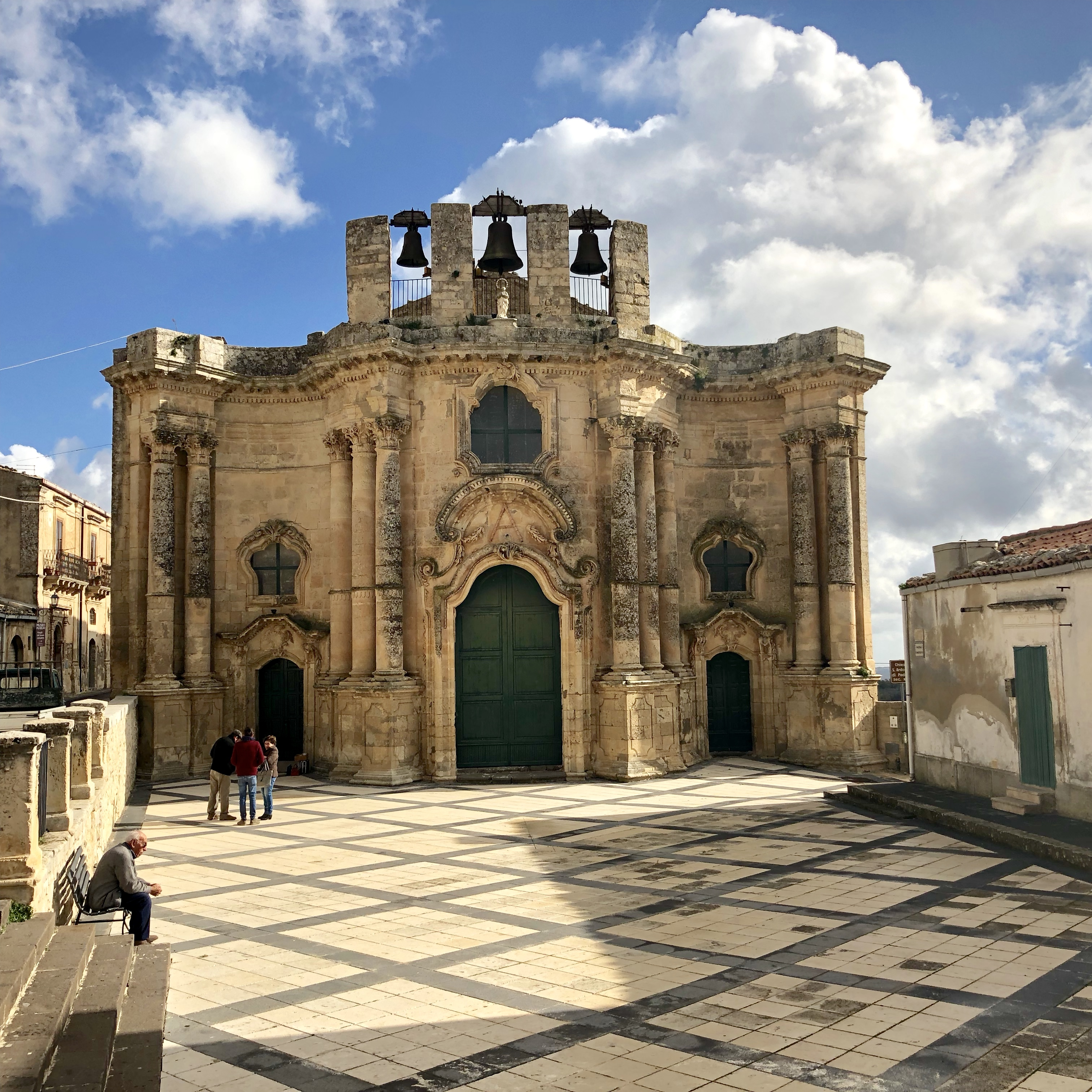
Sant'Antonino

Sant'Antonino is a Roman Catholic parish church located in Buscemi in the province of Siracusa, region of Sicily, Italy.

== History and description ==
A church at the site existed since the 16th century, since there is documentation about the construction of a new music organ in 1586, and a new bell-tower in 1601 by Antonio Calcararo. However this church was razed by the 1693 Sicily earthquake. Construction of a new baroque-style church was begun at the same site, but the death in 1624 of the architect vincenzo Mirabella Alagona left the church without a second story. The interior houses a wooden icon of the Addolorata attributed to Filippo Quattrocchi. Some restoration of the exterior and stucco interior have permitted reopening of the church.
