= Calogero Marrone =

Italian public servant

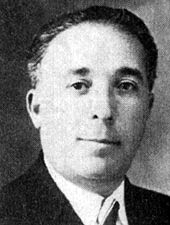
Calogero Marrone

Calogero Marrone (12 May 1889 – 15 February 1945) was an Italian public servant.

Marrone was the chief of the Civil Registry office in the municipality of Varese, Lombardy, during the Fascist Era and the Nazi occupation and issued hundreds of fake identity cards in order to save Jews and anti-fascists. He was arrested after an anonymous tip-off and died in the Dachau concentration camp. He has been awarded the title of Righteous Among the Nations.

== Life ==
Marrone was born in Favara, Sicily. He served as a sergeant in the First World War and then became local secretary of the Veterans Association in his home town. When Benito Mussolini took the power, Marrone refused to sign in the National Fascist Party and he spent a few months in jail. In 1931 he found a job in the town hall of Varese, so he moved to North Italy along with his wife Giuseppina and his four children Filippina, Salvatore, Dina and Domenico.

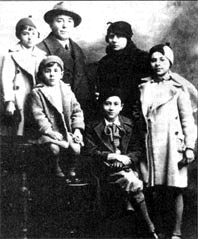
Marrone with his family

In Varese he had a quick career and he soon became chief of the Civil Register office, then with 12 employees, and from that position he began providing fake documents to Jews and anti-fascists, allowing them to escape from the Nazi hunt. However, an anonymous informant alerted authorities and he was arrested on 7 January 1944 and accused of collaborating with the Resistance, helping Jews escape, violation of official duties, and intelligence with the National Liberation Committee. Each of these charges could result in death by firing squad.

Calogero Marrone had already been suspended on 1 January and on 4 January he has been warned by Don Luigi Locatelli, a priest connected with the Resistance, that the SS were about to arrest him. Despite this Calogero Marrone did not try to escape either because he promised to the Podestà Domenico Castelletti that he would have collaborated in the investigations concerning him and, above all, to protect his family from retaliations. Detained and tortured in many judicial prisons, he revealed nothing. Sent to the Bolzano Transit Camp, he was eventually transferred to Dachau where he died on 15 February 1945, officially by typhus.

== Bibliography ==
Franco Giannantoni e Ibio Paolucci, Calogero Marrone, un eroe dimenticato (Calogero Marrone, a forgotten hero), Edizioni Arterigere
