= 2021 Ravanusa explosion =

Fatal disaster in Italy

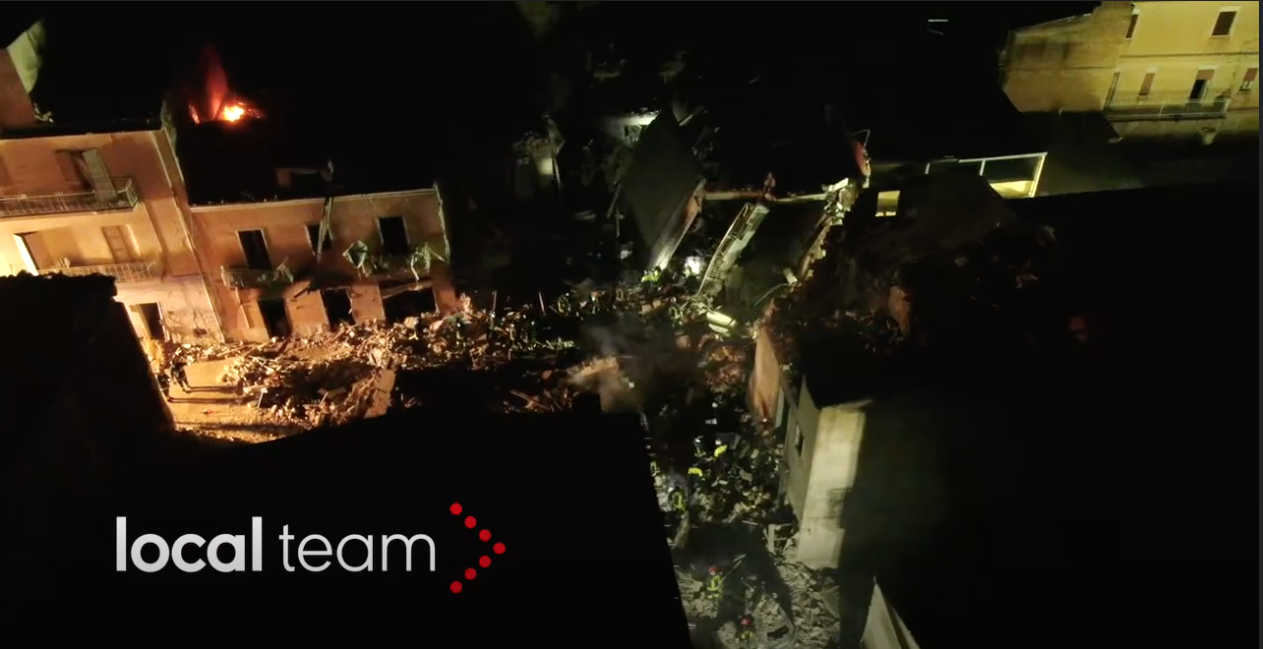
- Image of the disaster from the drone
- Date: 11 December 2021
- Location: Ravanusa, Agrigento, Sicily, Italy
- Cause: Gas leak
- Deaths: 9
- Injuries: 2
- Displaced: 100+

On 11 December 2021, an explosion caused the collapse of four buildings in Ravanusa, Italy, killing nine people.

== Explosion ==
During the late evening, a blast caused by a gas leak destroyed four residential buildings, causing their collapse. Three more buildings were damaged. During the immediate aftermath, eleven people were declared missing. The next morning, three people were found dead, while two more were found injured. Four more were found dead under the rubbles two days after the collapse, and the other two were found dead three days after the collapse. Four of the victims were members of the same family. About 100 people were displaced due to the explosions. Residents said there had been a strong smell of gas for several days before the blast.
