= Domenico Lo Faso Pietrasanta =

Domenico Antonio Lo Faso Pietrasanta
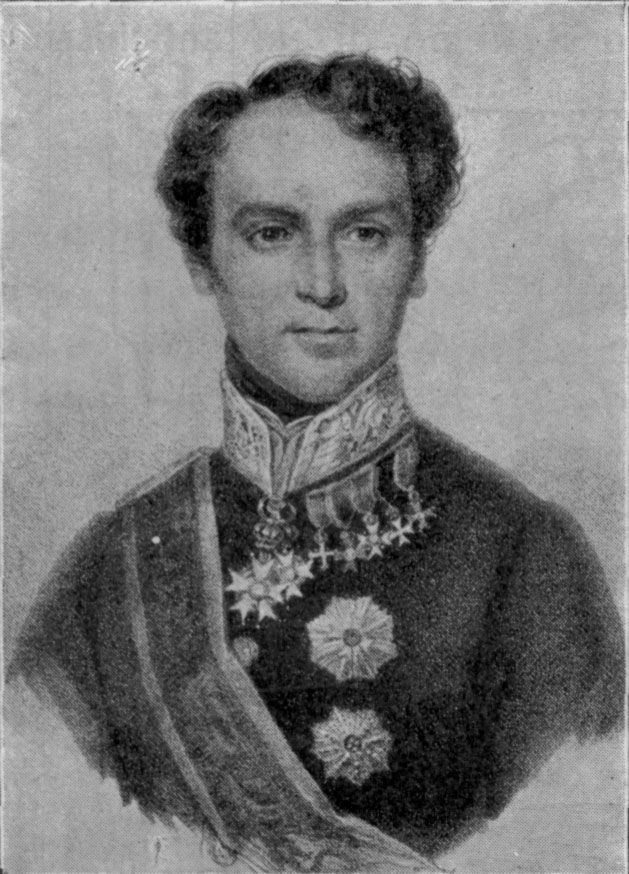
- Domenico Antonio Lo Faso Pietrasanta a.k.a. "Serradifalco"
- Born: October 21, 1783; Palermo, Kingdom of Sicily
- Died: February 15, 1863 (aged 79); Florence, Kingdom of Italy
- Monuments: A monument in the Church of San Domenico, Palermo, Sicily; A portrait in the Public Library of Palermo
- Other names: Serradifalco
- Organization: Duchy of Serradifalco

Domenico Antonio Lo Faso Pietrasanta (October 21, 1783, Palermo, Kingdom of Sicily – February 15, 1863, Florence, Kingdom of Italy) was an Italian architect, archaeologist, and author.

== Biography ==
Scholar, architect, student of archeology and architecture (mostly in Sicily), Domenico Antonio Lo Faso Pietrasanta Duke of Serradifalco, wrote several works on ancient and medieval Sicilian monuments.

He was born in Palermo during the Reign of Ferdinand III King of Sicily, to the noble House of Lo Faso, which acquired the barony and comune of Serradifalco in 1752. The first Lo Faso baron was made a Duke in 1664, and the barony became the Duchy of Serradifalco. Domenico Antonio married Enrichetta Ventimiglia on 30 December 1819. He inherited the Duchy and was invested as the Fifth Duke of Serradifalco on 8 December 1809. An avid student of Sicilian history, he studied architecture and archeology in Milan. He was elected a Foreign Honorary Member of the American Academy of Arts and Sciences in 1838. During the Revolution of 1848 he was Speaker of the House of Peers of the Parliament of the independent nation of Sicily and the country's Foreign Minister.

After the return of the Bourbons he was forced into exile in Florence. After the capture of the island by Garibaldi, he returned to Sicily. He was appointed President of the Commission of Antiquities and Fine Art and was called by the Senate of the Kingdom of Italy. He directed excavations and restorations in the major archaeological sites in Sicily: Segesta, Selinus, Agrigento, Syracuse, Taormina and published reports for all, containing detailed tables with reliefs and paintings of high quality which remains useful today. He was known throughout the field of archeology, and was called simply Serradifalco.

His portrait is preserved in the Biblioteca Comunale di Palermo (Public Library of Palermo).

In the church of San Domenico in Palermo, a monument is dedicated to him, bearing the inscription:
Domenico Lo Faso Pietrasanta Duke of Serradifalco
promoted Sicilian arts and letters with his mind and his inheritance.

== Principal projects in Palermo ==
- The Palace in the Royal Bourbon Forum (today Palermo's Foro Italico);
- The plans for the Finance Building;
- The Theatre of Music in the Bourbon Forum, in collaboration with Carlo Giachery, 1844

== Bibliography ==
- Description of an Antique Clay Vase, Palermo 1830
- Overview of the Ruins of Ancient Soluto, Palermo 1831
- The Antiquities of Sicily Described and Illustrated, Palermo 1834-42
- On the Cathedral of Monreale and Other Siculo-Norman Churches: Three arguments, Palermo 1838
- On the Relic "Heart of San Luigi": memoir of Domenico Lo Faso Pietrasanta, Palermo 1843
- The Ancient Monuments of Sicily in Pictorial Views Designed by the Duke of Serradifalco, Palermo 1843
- On Gothic Architecture, 1847
