= Castellazzo di Camastra =

Castle in Sicily

- Camastra, Sicily, Italy

Site information
- Type: Castle
- Condition: Ruins

Location
- Coordinates: 37°16′20.8″N 13°48′29.62″E

Site history
- Built: 14th century
- Materials: Stone

The Castellazzo di Camastra is a castle in Camastra, Sicily. It was built in the 14th century, and it now lies in ruins.

== History ==
The Castellazzo was built in the 14th century on the edge of a rocky plateau to control the surrounding estates. The oldest reference to a turris Camastra dates back to 1366, and in 1374 the area was in the possession of the nobleman Manfredi Chiaramonte.

The site of the Castellazzo has been identified with the legendary city of Camico.

== Layout ==
The Castellazzo consists of an irregular pentagonal tower, which is made up of stones bound together by mortar. Parts of the structure also consist of Cyclopean masonry. Some of the remaining walls are up to 3.5m high.
