= Grotte, Sicily =

Grotte
- Comune
- Comune di Grotte
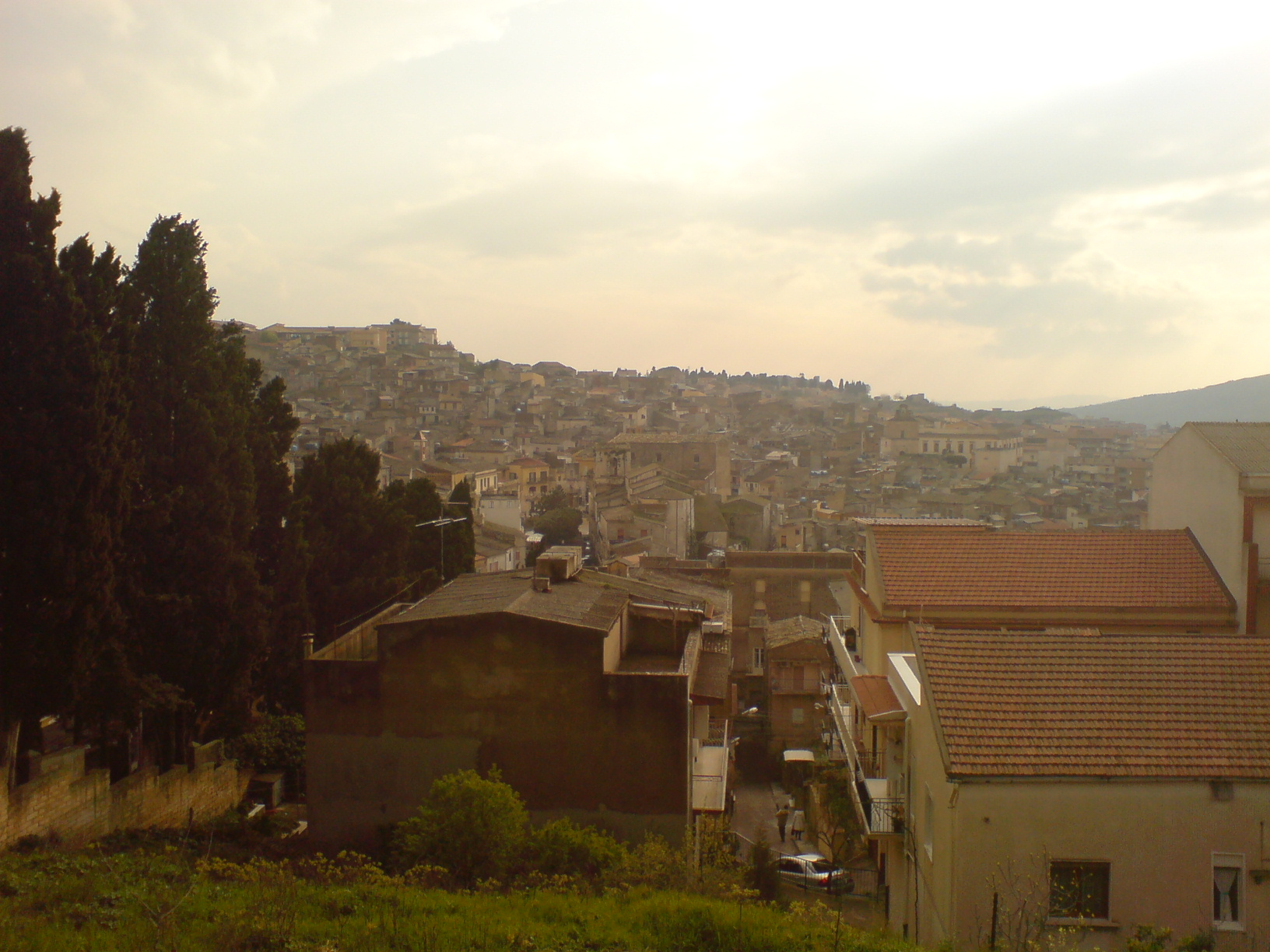
- View of Grotte

- Location within Italy Location within Sicily
- Coordinates: 37°24′21″N 13°42′4″E
- Country: Italy
- Region: Sicily
- Province: Agrigento (AG)

Government
  - Mayor: Alfonso Provvidenza

Area
  - Total: 23.98 km^{2} (9.26 sq mi)
- Elevation: 516 m (1,693 ft)

Population (31 August 2017)
  - Total: 5,633
  - Density: 234.9/km^{2} (608.4/sq mi)
- Demonym: Grottesi
- Time zone: UTC+1 (CET)
  - Summer (DST): UTC+2 (CEST)
- Postal code: 92020
- Dialing code: 0922
- Website: Official website

Grotte (Sicilian: Grutti) is a comune (municipality) in the Province of Agrigento in the Italian region Sicily, located about 80 kilometres (50 mi) southeast of Palermo and about 14 kilometres (9 mi) northeast of Agrigento.

Grotte borders the following municipalities: Aragona, Campofranco, Comitini, Favara, Milena, Racalmuto.

== Twin towns ==
- Lenola, Italy
- Militello Rosmarino, Italy
- Mircea Vodă, Romania
