= Castrofilippo =

- Comune
- Comune di Castrofilippo
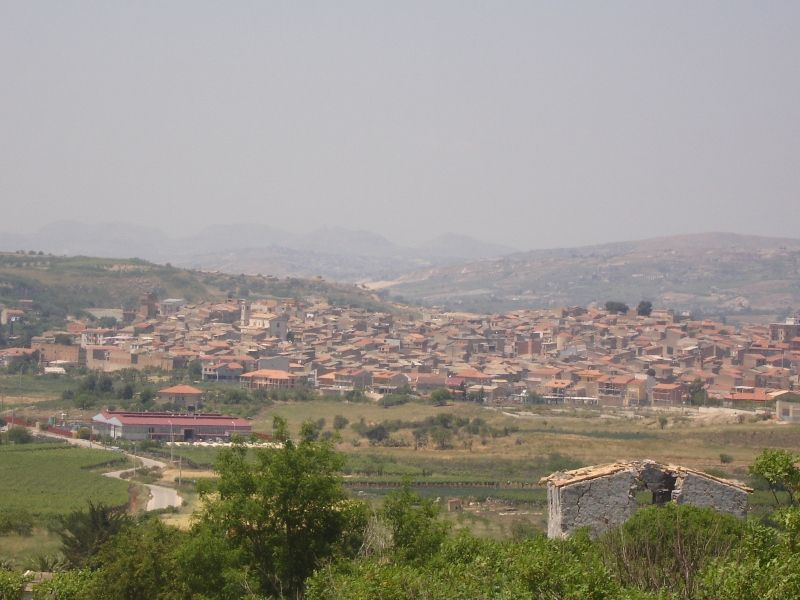
- View of Castrofilippo

- Location within Italy Location within Sicily
- Coordinates: 37°21′N 13°45′E
- Country: Italy
- Region: Sicily
- Province: Province of Agrigento (AG)

Government
  - Mayor: Antonio Francesco Badalamenti from 10 June 2019

Area
  - Total: 18.0 km^{2} (6.9 sq mi)
- Elevation: 470 m (1,540 ft)

Population (Dec. 2004)
  - Total: 3,170
  - Density: 176/km^{2} (456/sq mi)
- Demonym: Castrofilippesi
- Time zone: UTC+1 (CET)
  - Summer (DST): UTC+2 (CEST)
- Postal code: 92020
- Dialing code: 0922
- Patron saint: Saint Anthony Abate
- Saint day: 17 January
- Website: Official website

Castrofilippo (Sicilian: Castrufilippu) is a comune (municipality) in the Province of Agrigento in the Italian region Sicily, located about 90 kilometres (56 mi) southeast of Palermo and about 15 kilometres (9 mi) east of Agrigento. As of 31 December 2004, it had a population of 3,170 and an area of 18.0 square kilometres (6.9 mi^{2}).

Castrofilippo borders the following municipalities: Canicattì, Favara, Naro, Racalmuto.

== Demographic evolution ==
Historical population

Year	Pop.	±%
1861	2,557	—
1871	2,809	+9.9%
1881	3,367	+19.9%
1901	4,203	+24.8%
1911	4,817	+14.6%

Year	Pop.	±%
1921	5,087	+5.6%
1931	4,228	−16.9%
1936	4,377	+3.5%
1951	4,815	+10.0%
1961	4,730	−1.8%

Year	Pop.	±%
1971	4,130	−12.7%
1981	3,789	−8.3%
1991	3,581	−5.5%
2001	3,247	−9.3%

Source: Data from ISTAT
