= Serradifalco =

- Comune
- Comune di Serradifalco
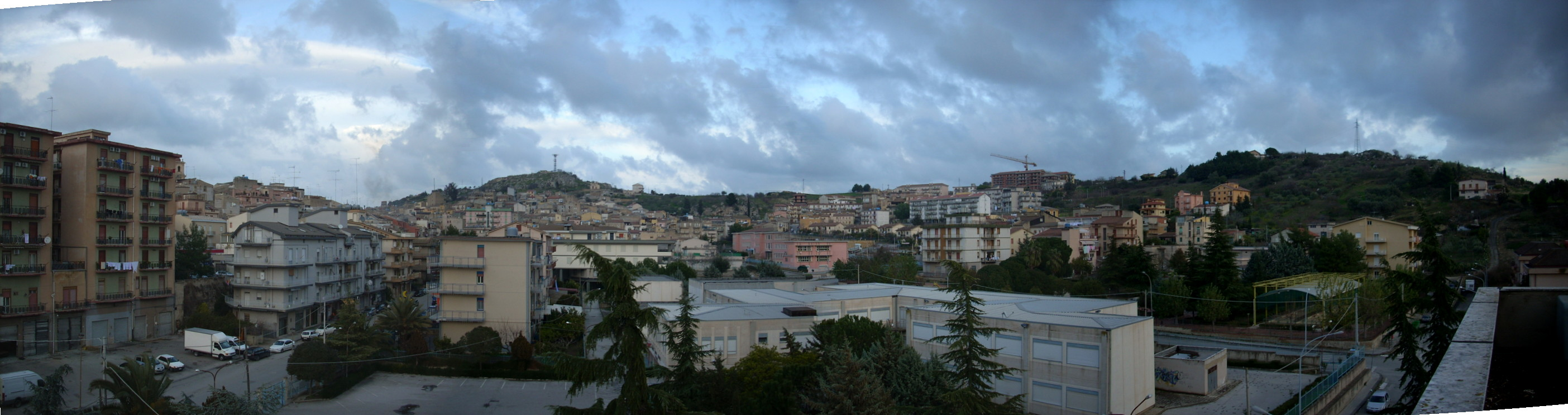

- Coat of arms

- Location within Italy Location within Sicily
- Coordinates: 37°27′N 13°53′E
- Country: Italy
- Region: Sicily
- Province: Caltanissetta (CL)
- Frazioni: Grottadacqua

Government
  - Mayor: Leonardo Burgio

Area
  - Total: 41 km^{2} (16 sq mi)
- Elevation: 504 m (1,654 ft)

Population (2006)
  - Total: 6,420
  - Density: 160/km^{2} (410/sq mi)
- Demonym: Serradifalchesi
- Time zone: UTC+1 (CET)
  - Summer (DST): UTC+2 (CEST)
- Postal code: 93010
- Dialing code: 0934
- Patron saint: San Leonardo Abate
- Website: Official website

Serradifalco (Sicilian: Serradifarcu) is a town and comune in the province of Caltanissetta, Sicily, Italy.

Serra del Falcone.

== History ==
Serradifalco (from Serra del Falcone, "Mountain of the Falcon") was founded in the Kingdom of Sicily, in a feudal fief which bore the same name since the late 15th century. The town itself was founded in 1640 under permit from King Philip IV of Spain to Maria Ventimiglia, grandmother and governess of Baron Francesco Grifeo, a minor. In 1652, ownership of the Barony and Town passed to the Lo Faso family. In 1666, it became a Duchy under Duke Leonardo Lo Faso, and it remained in control of the House of Lo Faso until the abolition of feudalism in 1812. Its last duke was Domenico Antonio Lo Faso Pietrasanta (1783–1863). His rule was from 1809 through 1812. He was a renowned archaeologist and was instrumental in promulgating the excavation and restoration of the Valley of the Temples in Agrigento.

Sulfur mining, in some of the oldest mines in Sicily, and farming were the most prevalent occupations in Serradifalco after the Italian unification in 1860.

Serradifalco was the site of the first bicycle manufacturer in southern Italy, Montante Cicli, which produces one of the world's elite brands of bicycles.

In the great emigration of Sicilians to the United States in the late 19th and early 20th centuries, many Serradifalchesi farm laborers and sulfur miners went to American towns, including Pittston and Robertsdale, where they worked as coal miners; and to Buffalo and its rural environs, where they found employment with the steel plants and railroads, and in the strawberry and corn fields.

== Main sights ==
- The Chiesa Madre San Leonardo completed in 1755 in the roccocò style.
- The Chiesa San Francesco (completed 1653). The town's first church and original Chiesa Madre.
- The Palazzo Ducale, or Ducal Palace, in the town square (Piazza del Barone)
- Lago Soprano (Soprano Lake, also called "Cuba"), a migratory fowl preserve with unique hydrology. It was formed only within the past hundred years, and has no surface streams flowing in or out.
- In the Grottadacqua district, a Mycenaean necropolis with prehistoric Sicanian domed tombs.
- The Testa dell'acqua (Head of water), an ancient fountain said to be the site of a mythical, magical Fiera di mezzanotte (Midnight Fair) that appears only once every seven years.

== Twin towns ==
- Colfontaine, Belgium, since 1984

== Bibliography ==
- Domenico Lo Faso Pietrasanta, The Antiquities of Sicily Described and Illustrated, Palermo 1834–42
- Giovanni Fatta, Maria Clara Ruggieri Tricoli, Un rinnovamento sulla base della natura: Serradifalco e l’unità dello stile, Cavallari e il connubio di tecnica ed arte, in Palermo nell’Età del Ferro, Palermo 1983, pp. 88–92
- Giuseppe Testa, "Serradifalco", Serradifalco 1990
- Ettore Sessa, Domenico Lo Faso Pietrasanta, Duca di Serradifalco: ricerca del nuovo sistema di architettura e insegnamento privato, in G.B.F. Basile, Lezioni di architettura, a cura di Maria Giuffrè, G. Guerrera, Palermo 1995, pp. 269–277
- Gabriella Cianciolo Cosentino, Serradifalco e la Germania. La Stildiskussion tra Sicilia e Baviera 1823-1850, Benevento 2004
- Gabriella Cianciolo Cosentino, Un manoscritto sull'architettura gotica del Duca di Serradifalco (1847), in "Lexicon. Storie e architettura in Sicilia" n. 2, 2006, pp. 80–87
- Angelo F. Coniglio, The Lady of the Wheel, Mineola, 2012
