= Comitini =

- Comune
- Comune di Comitini
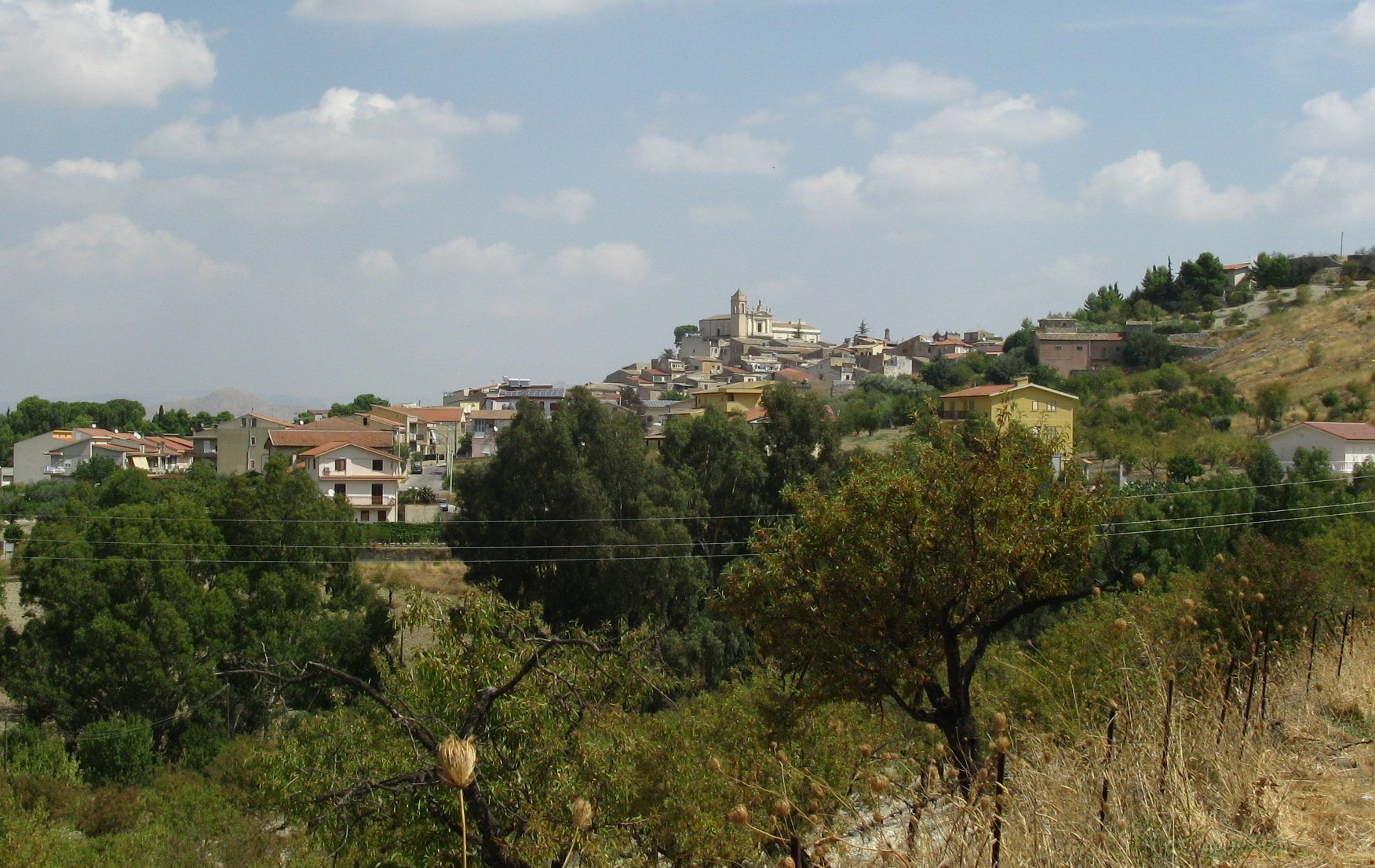
- View of Comitini

- Coat of arms

- Location within Italy Location within Sicily
- Coordinates: 37°25′N 13°39′E
- Country: Italy
- Region: Sicily
- Province: Agrigento (AG)

Government
  - Mayor: Nino Contino

Area
  - Total: 21.89 km^{2} (8.45 sq mi)
- Elevation: 350 m (1,150 ft)

Population (30 June 2017)
  - Total: 974
  - Density: 44.5/km^{2} (115/sq mi)
- Demonym: Comitinesi
- Time zone: UTC+1 (CET)
  - Summer (DST): UTC+2 (CEST)
- Postal code: 92020
- Dialing code: 0922
- Website: Official website

Comitini (Sicilian: Cuminiti) is a comune (municipality) in the Province of Agrigento in the Italian region Sicily, located about 80 kilometres (50 mi) southeast of Palermo and about 13 kilometres (8 mi) northeast of Agrigento. The town is located on a hilly area, 346 metres (1,135 ft) above sea level.

== History ==
The town was founded in 1627 by Gastone Bellacera on a hill named Comitini. In 1673, Michele Gravina was appointed prince of the town.

In the early 19th century the extraction of sulfur from the mines in the territory, due to an increased demand caused by the Industrial Revolution in Great Britain, gave a new impulse to the economy which was followed by a remarkable population growth. The town became one of the most important mining centres of the Agrigento province, as described by Luigi Pirandello in his novel The Old and the Young (I vecchi e i giovani) (1928). With the decline of the sulfur mining industry in the 20th century many townspeople opted for emigration.

A long strip of land between the country towns of Aragona and Grotte, Comitini boasts a substantial agricultural production of almonds, olives, grapes, and citrus fruits. As of 31 December 2011, it had a population of 944 and an area of 21.7 square kilometres (8.4 mi^{2}).

Comitini borders the following municipalities Aragona, Favara, Grotte.
