= Furnari =

Furnari Fùrnaris
- Comune
- Comune di Furnari
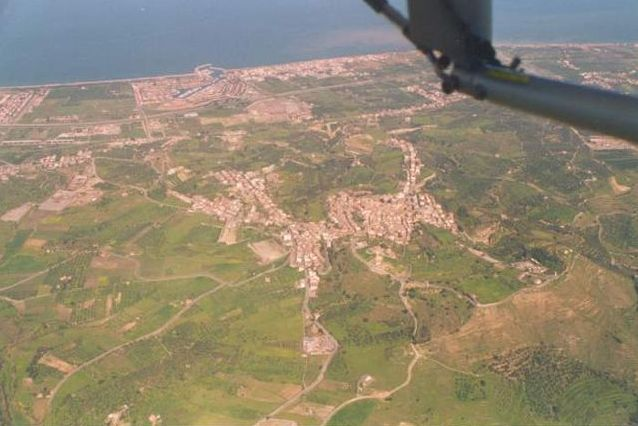

- Location within Italy Location within Sicily
- Coordinates: 38°6′N 15°7′E
- Country: Italy
- Region: Sicily
- Metropolitan city: Messina (ME)
- Frazioni: Tonnarella

Government
  - Mayor: Felice Germanò

Area
  - Total: 13.48 km^{2} (5.20 sq mi)
- Elevation: 145 m (476 ft)

Population (30 September 2016)
  - Total: 3,803
  - Density: 282.1/km^{2} (730.7/sq mi)
- Demonym: Furnaresi
- Time zone: UTC+1 (CET)
  - Summer (DST): UTC+2 (CEST)
- Postal code: 98054
- Dialing code: 0941
- Patron saint: St. Anthony of Padua
- Saint day: 13 June
- Website: Official website

Furnari (Sicilian: Fùrnari) is a comune (municipality) in the Metropolitan City of Messina in the Italian region Sicily, located about 178 kilometres (111 mi) east of Palermo and about 54 kilometres (34 mi) west of Messina.

Furnari borders the following municipalities: Falcone, Mazzarrà Sant'Andrea, Terme Vigliatore, Tripi.

== Public transport ==
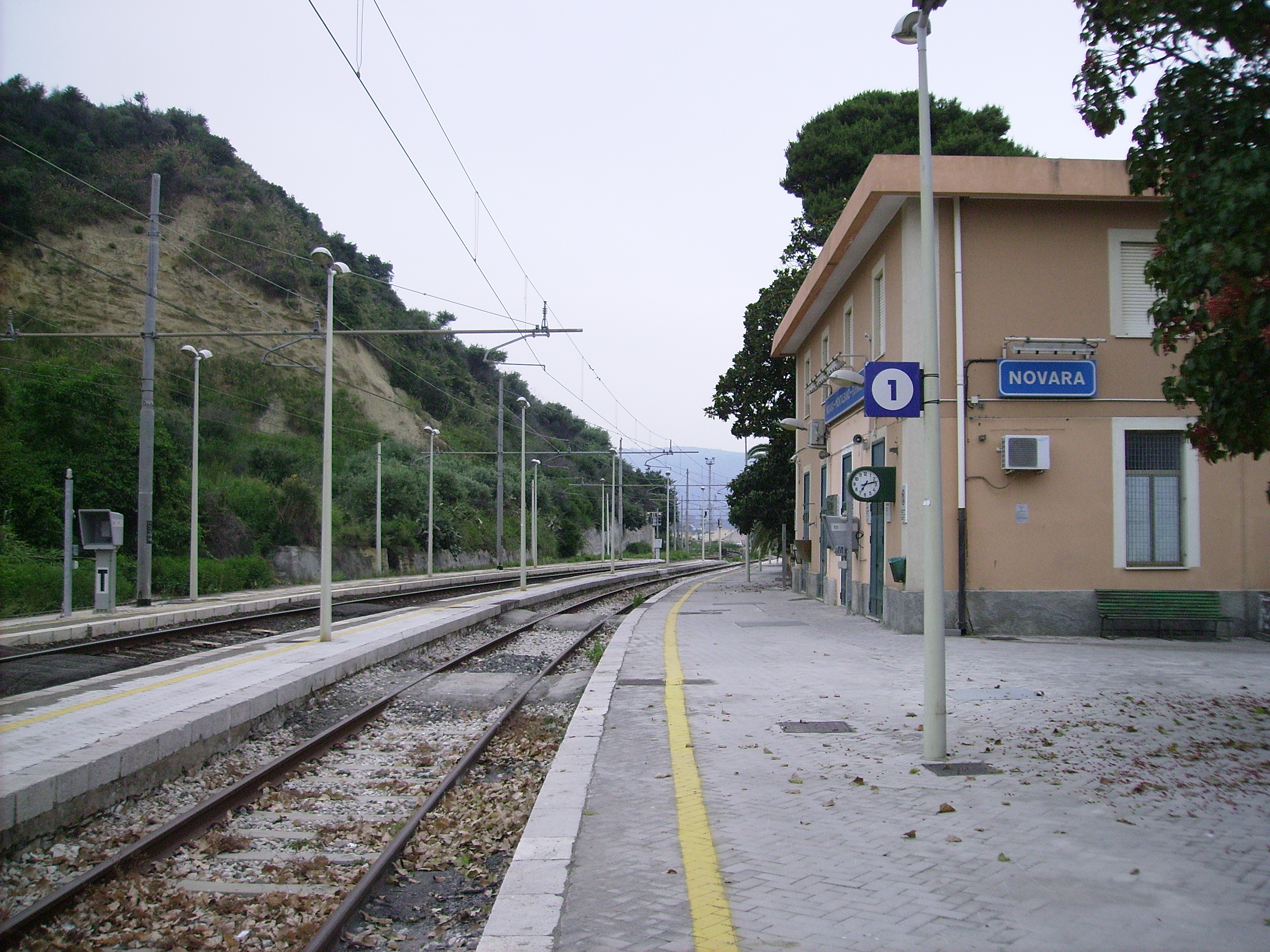
Novara-Montalbano-Furnari railway station

=== Railways ===
Novara-Montalbano-Furnari railway station is on the Palermo–Messina railway. It is served by trains run by Trenitalia, including services from Messina. Outside of the station is available an Uber service by app.

=== Bus and tram ===
Furnari is served by bus provided from Azienda Siciliana Trasporti.
