= The Lady of the Wheel =

2012 novel by Angelo F. Coniglio

The Lady of the Wheel (La Ruotaia)
- First edition cover
- Author: Angelo F. Coniglio
- Original title: The Lady of the Wheel (La Ruotaia)
- Language: English and Sicilian
- Genre: Fiction
- Publisher: Legas
- Publication date: 2012
- Publication place: Sicily
- Media type: Print (Paperback)
- ISBN: 1881901-86-6

The Lady of the Wheel (La Ruotaia) is a 2012 historical fiction novel by Sicilian American author Angelo F. Coniglio. The book follows the life of a girl who was abandoned as an infant, with the major themes of the book including poverty, exploitation and family values.

== Plot summary ==
A mother abandons an infant girl, placing her inside a 'foundling wheel' to be cared for in a foundling home, and the woman's husband gives up a young son as a carusu, a virtual slave in a sulfur mine; both actions intended to help the remaining family to survive in poverty-stricken Racalmuto, in late-1800s Sicily. It was common for families to give up their boys at the age of five as carusi, selling them to the mining company for life for a small price, and the parents treat it matter-of-factly as a regrettable but unavoidable decision. The plot follows the girl's life as a foundling, and her brother's labors in the mine, working ten-hour days in hellish conditions, and their interactions with family and co-workers. As plot devices, the author includes examples of Napoleon-inspired recording of civil documents, and describes the Sicilian conventions for selecting the given names of a family's children.
