= Rodì Milici =

- Comune
- Comune di Rodì Milici
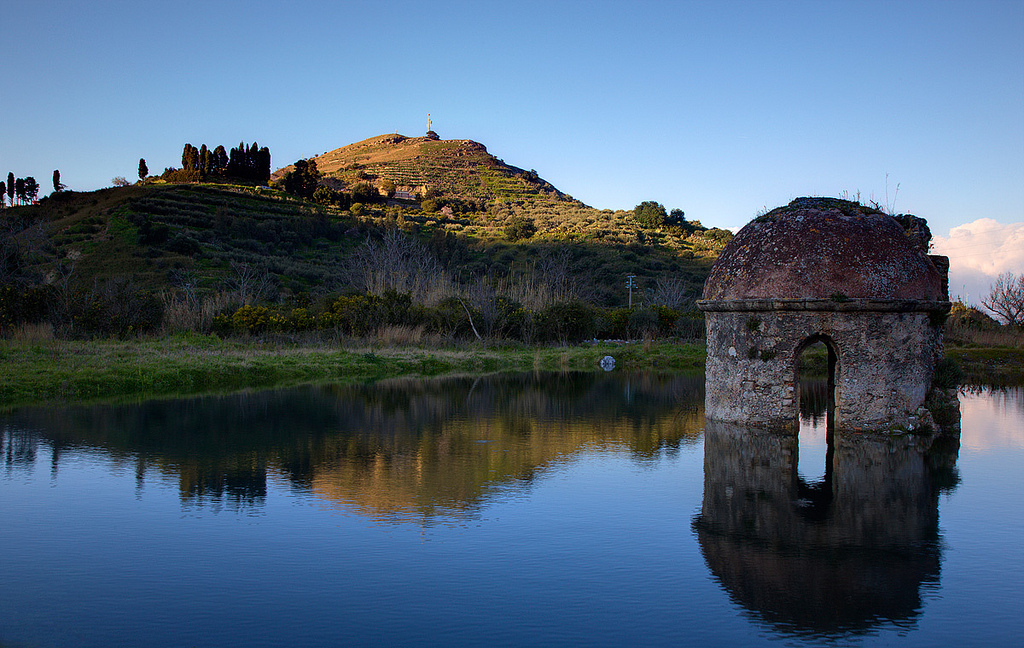
- The Cupola Rosata

- Location within Italy Location within Sicily
- Coordinates: 38°7′N 15°10′E
- Country: Italy
- Region: Sicily
- Metropolitan city: Messina (ME)
- Frazioni: Pietre Rosse, Case Bruciate, Porticato

Government
  - Mayor: Eugenio Aliberti

Area
  - Total: 36 km^{2} (14 sq mi)
- Elevation: 125 m (410 ft)

Population (30 April 2012)
  - Total: 2,149
  - Density: 60/km^{2} (150/sq mi)
- Demonym(s): Rodiesi (Rudioti), Milicioti
- Time zone: UTC+1 (CET)
  - Summer (DST): UTC+2 (CEST)
- Postal code: 98059
- Dialing code: 090
- Patron saint: Saint Batholomew, Saint Philip of Agira
- Saint day: 24 August, 12 May
- Website: Official website

Rodì Milici (Sicilian: Rudìa Milici) is an Italian comune in the Metropolitan City of Messina in Sicily. The comune is located about 160 kilometres (99 mi) east of Palermo and about 35 kilometres (22 mi) west of Messina.

Rodì Milici borders the following municipalities: Antillo, Castroreale, Fondachelli-Fantina, Mazzarrà Sant'Andrea, Novara di Sicilia, Terme Vigliatore.

== See also ==
- Milici, Italy
