= Ravanusa =

- Comune
- Comune di Ravanusa
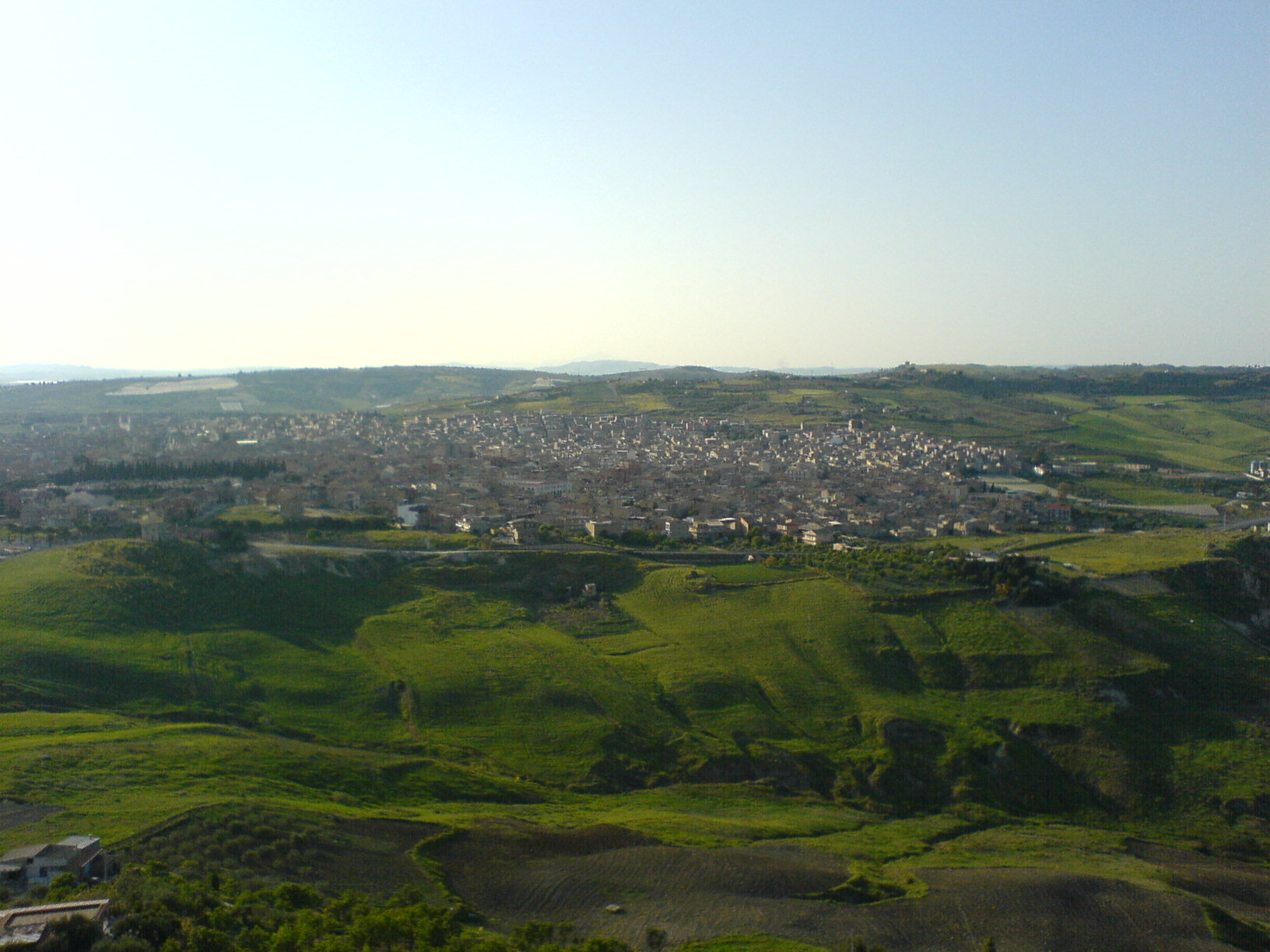
- View of Ravanusa

- Coat of arms

- Location within Italy Location within Sicily
- Coordinates: 37°16′N 13°58′E
- Country: Italy
- Region: Sicily
- Province: Agrigento (AG)
- Frazioni: Campobello-Ravanusa stazione

Government
  - Mayor: Carmelo D'Angelo

Area
  - Total: 49.6 km^{2} (19.2 sq mi)
- Elevation: 320 m (1,050 ft)

Population (31 December 2008)
  - Total: 15,222
  - Density: 307/km^{2} (795/sq mi)
- Demonym: Ravanusauri
- Time zone: UTC+1 (CET)
  - Summer (DST): UTC+2 (CEST)
- Postal code: 92029
- Dialing code: 0922
- Website: Official website

Ravanusa (Sicilian: Rivinusa) is a comune (municipality) in the Province of Agrigento in the Italian region Sicily, located about 110 kilometres (68 mi) southeast of Palermo and about 35 kilometres (22 mi) east of Agrigento.

Ravanusa is near the Monte Saraceno archaeological site, an ancient Greek settlement thought to be that of the city of Kakyron. The Muslim Arab domination begins at the beginning of the 9th century, more precisely from 829, when the Muslims occupy Agrigento for the first time and lasts until July 25, 1086.

With the arrivals of the Normans, Ruggero Altavilla, conquered Kerkent (Agrigento) on July 25, 1086 - said Malaterra, and he immediately began the conquest of eleven castles, including Licata, Bifar, Muclof, Naro and Remise, all familiar to the Ravanusani, as a locality. Once Ravanusa was conquered by the Normans, they introduced a new political and economic-social order in the conquered territories; feudalism, born in the 9th century, under the Carolingian Empire. The fiefs, large landholdings, were granted as a benefaction by the sovereign to particular "lords", who remained bound to him by bonds of fidelity and dependence. Ruggero, immediately after the conquest of Sicily, granted feudal advantages to the Norman or native lords who had helped him in his undertakings. Among these was Salvatore Palmeri related by kinship to the sovereign and who distinguished himself in the fight against the Saracens: to him Ruggero granted the new farm and the fiefdom of Ravanusa.

During the reign of Frederick II of Aragon, around 1300, the Casale and Feudo di Ravanusa passed to the Tagliavia family: Nicolò first and Giovanni De crescenzo later. The latter, rushing against the authority of the sovereign Frederick III, was deprived of the fief of Ravanusa which passed in 1361 to Pietro Mauro and then to Fulco Palmeri da Naro. Followed by Luigi Tagliavia, Mucchio di Landolina and Rodrigo Zappada. In 1449 Andrea De Crescenzo, marrying the niece of Fulco Palmeri, became lord either by purchase or by inheritance of the barony of Canicattì and the fief of Ravanusa. De Crescenzo can be considered one of the fathers of Ravanusa from a religious and civil point of view; in 1450 he obtained permission from King Alfonso of Valenza to build an inn for travelers which was built in the lower part of the current town (Via Ibla).

With the authorization of the bishop of Agrigento Domenico Xart, he built a convent in Ravanusa for the regular canons of San Giorgio in Alga; this building was next to the Church of the Madonna del Fico, whose feast, as Pirro reports, was celebrated on August 15 with a fair and a market and a large number of people. It was De Crescenzo who wanted the social elevation of the city; he obtained, in fact, from King Giovanni, son and successor of Alfonso, the elevation of the fief of Ravanusa from simple and ordinary to noble fief and civil and military jurisdiction. This happened on December 30, 1472 and from that date the barony of Ravanusa began, which continued in the various hereditary ramifications until 1806 (September 1) when Ferdinand III of Bourbon abolished feudalism . Death of Grescenzo, he was succeeded by his son Giovanni and in 1553 his daughter, Brianda, wife of Girolamo Bonanno; she, childless, was replaced by her sister Ramondetta, wife of Francesco Calogero Bonanno.

When Ferdinand de Bourbon abolished feudalism, baronial jurisdictions and today a privilege linked to the feudal system, the "lands or universities" were erected into municipalities and the former feudal lords were forced to abandon part of their palaces to serve as the town hall, the prison and the annona. The last baron yields to the new Municipality of Ravanusa part of the ground floor and its building located in the current Piazza 1° Maggio, for the municipal house; three rooms in the building located in Via Manzoni for the prison; and a room in the building located between the current Corso della Repubblica and Via Pisacane, for the annona. Subsequently, in 1866, with the confiscation of property belonging to religious orders, the town hall, the prison and the primary school will be placed in the premises of the former convent of the Friars Minor.

In December 2021, an explosion due to a leak of methane gas from the pipes, destroys seven buildings, causing 9 deaths, including an entire family, and 100 displaced.

== Twin towns ==
- Marignane, France
- Sulzbach/Saar, Germany
- Forbach, France
