= Calamonaci =

Calamonaci Kalí Monachí (Greek)
- Comune
- Comune di Calamonaci
- Coat of arms

- Location within Italy Location within Sicily
- Coordinates: 37°32′N 13°17′E
- Country: Italy
- Region: Sicily
- Province: Agrigento (AG)

Government
  - Mayor: Vincenzo Inga

Area
  - Total: 32.6 km^{2} (12.6 sq mi)
- Elevation: 307 m (1,007 ft)

Population (30 June 2009)
  - Total: 1,395
  - Density: 42.8/km^{2} (111/sq mi)
- Demonym: Calamonacesi
- Time zone: UTC+1 (CET)
  - Summer (DST): UTC+2 (CEST)
- Postal code: 92010
- Dialing code: 0925
- Patron saint: St. Vincent Ferrer
- Website: Official website

Calamonaci is a comune (municipality) in the Province of Agrigento in the Italian region Sicily, located about 70 kilometres (43 mi) south of Palermo and about 35 kilometres (22 mi) northwest of Agrigento.

== Sights of interest ==
=== Religious architecture ===
- Church of San Vincenzo Ferreri (mother church)
- Calvario
- Carmelite Order Convent (1585)
