= Camastra =

- Comune
- Comune di Camastra
- Location within Italy Location within Sicily
- Coordinates: 37°15′N 13°48′E
- Country: Italy
- Region: Sicily
- Province: Province of Agrigento (AG)

Area
  - Total: 16.3 km^{2} (6.3 sq mi)
- Elevation: 450 m (1,480 ft)

Population (Dec. 2004)
  - Total: 2,133
  - Density: 131/km^{2} (339/sq mi)
- Demonym: Camastresi
- Time zone: UTC+1 (CET)
  - Summer (DST): UTC+2 (CEST)
- Postal code: 92020
- Dialing code: 0922

Camastra is a comune (municipality) in the Province of Agrigento in the Italian region Sicily, located about 100 kilometres (62 mi) southeast of Palermo and about 20 kilometres (12 mi) southeast of Agrigento. As of 31 December 2004, it had a population of 2,133 and an area of 16.3 square kilometres (6.3 mi^{2}).

Camastra borders the following municipalities: Licata, Naro, Palma di Montechiaro.

The municipality contains the ruins of the Castellazzo di Camastra.

== Demographic evolution ==
Historical population

Year	Pop.	±%
1861	1,072	—
1871	1,115	+4.0%
1881	1,331	+19.4%
1901	1,819	+36.7%
1911	2,182	+20.0%

Year	Pop.	±%
1921	2,525	+15.7%
1931	3,050	+20.8%
1936	3,043	−0.2%
1951	3,260	+7.1%
1961	2,707	−17.0%

Year	Pop.	±%
1971	3,028	+11.9%
1981	3,108	+2.6%
1991	3,034	−2.4%
2001	2,185	−28.0%

Source: Data from ISTAT
