= Terme Vigliatore =

- Comune
- Comune di Terme Vigliatore
- Location within Italy Location within Sicily
- Coordinates: 38°8′N 15°10′E
- Country: Italy
- Region: Sicily
- Metropolitan city: Messina (ME)
- Frazioni: Terme, Maceo, S. Biagio, Acquitta, Cannotta, Marchesana, Mendola, Pietre Rosse, Ponte Cicero, Pizzicarì, Salicà, Vigliatore, Dromo

Government
  - Mayor: Bartolo Cipriano

Area
  - Total: 13.4 km^{2} (5.2 sq mi)
- Elevation: 10 m (33 ft)

Population (30 November 2012)
  - Total: 7,272
  - Density: 543/km^{2} (1,410/sq mi)
- Demonym(s): Timminoti, Termensi
- Time zone: UTC+1 (CET)
  - Summer (DST): UTC+2 (CEST)
- Postal code: 98050
- Dialing code: 090
- Website: Official website

Terme Vigliatore (Sicilian: Tèrmini Vigghiaturi) is a comune (municipality) in the Metropolitan City of Messina in the Italian region Sicily, located about 160 kilometres (99 mi) east of Palermo and about 35 kilometres (22 mi) west of Messina at the mouth of the Patrì river. Terme Vigliatore borders the following municipalities: Barcellona Pozzo di Gotto, Castroreale, Furnari, Mazzarrà Sant'Andrea, Rodì Milici.

A Roman villa of the 1st century BC, with 53 rooms, is situated in the hamlet of Saint Biagio.

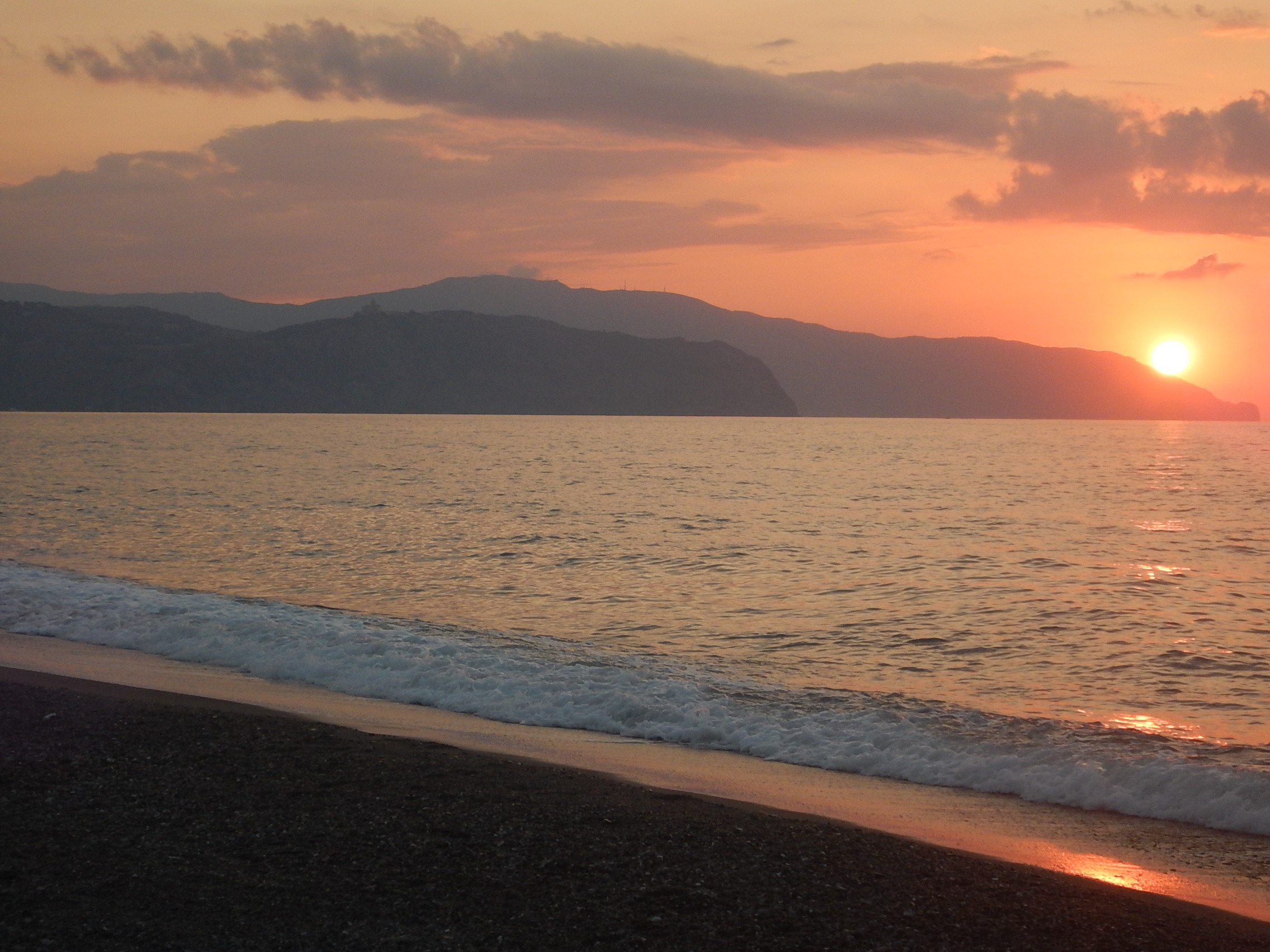
the beach of Terme Vigliatore with Tyndaris cape an Calavà cape at the sunset
