= Canicattini Bagni =

Municipality in Sicily, Italy

- Comune
- Comune di Canicattini Bagni
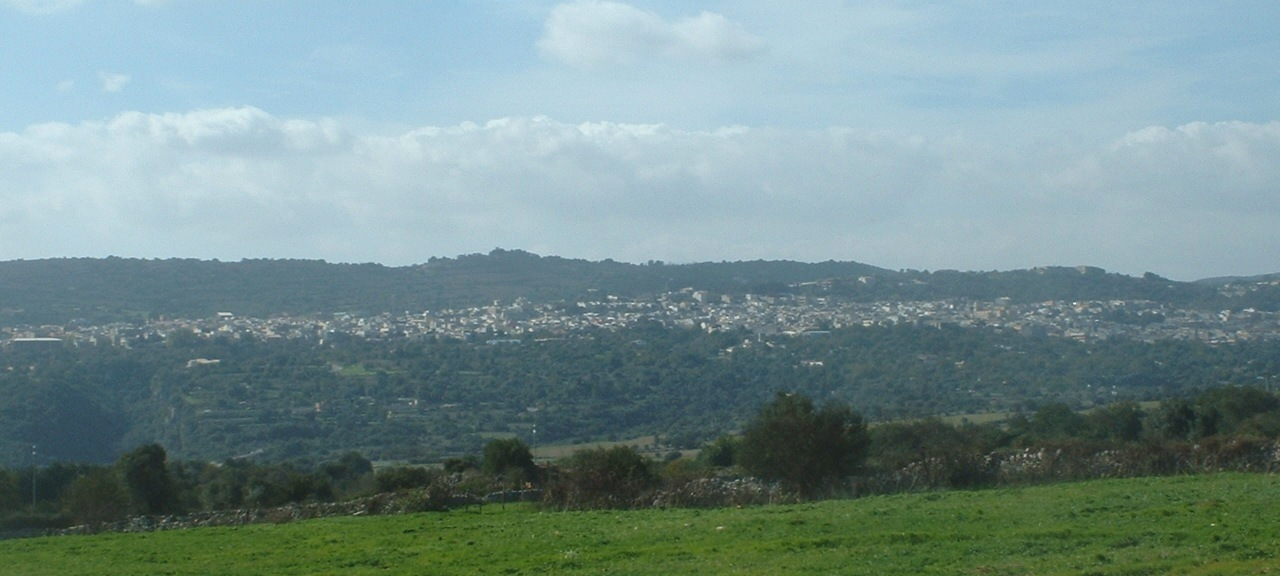
- Panorama of the comune

- Location within Italy Location within Sicily
- Coordinates: 37°2′N 15°4′E
- Country: Italy
- Region: Sicily
- Province: Province of Syracuse (SR)

Area
  - Total: 15.1 km^{2} (5.8 sq mi)
- Elevation: 362 m (1,188 ft)

Population (Dec. 2004)
  - Total: 7,415
  - Density: 491/km^{2} (1,270/sq mi)
- Demonym: Canicattinesi
- Time zone: UTC+1 (CET)
  - Summer (DST): UTC+2 (CEST)
- Postal code: 96010
- Dialing code: 0931
- Website: Official website

Canicattini Bagni (Sicilian: Janiattini) is a comune (municipality) in the Province of Syracuse, Sicily (Italy), located about 190 kilometres (120 mi) southeast of Palermo and about 20 kilometres (12 mi) southwest of Syracuse. As of 31 December 2004, it had a population of 7,415 and an area of 15.1 square kilometres (5.8 mi^{2}).

The appositive Bagni ('baths' in Italian) does not indicate the presence of any thermal baths. Instead, it refers to the territory once belonging to the Danieli noblemen, lords of the Bagni fiefdom.

Canicattini Bagni borders the following municipalities: Noto, Syracuse.

== Demographic evolution ==
Historical population

Year	Pop.	±%
1861	5,170	—
1871	5,717	+10.6%
1881	7,050	+23.3%
1901	8,871	+25.8%
1911	10,388	+17.1%

Year	Pop.	±%
1921	11,809	+13.7%
1931	9,260	−21.6%
1936	9,827	+6.1%
1951	9,783	−0.4%
1961	8,572	−12.4%

Year	Pop.	±%
1971	7,548	−11.9%
1981	7,485	−0.8%
1991	7,535	+0.7%
2001	7,519	−0.2%

Source: Data from ISTAT

== Bibliography ==
- AGNELLO G., Argenterie e bronzi, Siracusa 1948.
- AGNELLO G., L’architettura bizantina in Sicilia, Firenze 1952.
- AJELLO S., Canicattini Bagni-monografia, Palermo 1907 (ristampa Canicattini Bagni 2007).
- CARPINTERI S., Canicattini Cristiana, tesi di laurea (inedita), relatore prof. G. Agnello, Università di Catania, A.A. 1955/1956.
- CUGNO S. A., Il paesaggio rurale siracusano nella tarda età romana: il territorio di Canicattini Bagni, in Forma Urbis, anno XIV, n.10, Roma ottobre 2009, pp. 46–58.
- CUGNO S. A., Canicattini Bagni (Siracusa) tardoromana e bizantina. Contributo allo studio degli insediamenti iblei nella Tarda Antichità, in Journal of Ancient Topography, XIX, 2009, pp. 139–166.
- CUGNO S. A., Osservazioni sul tesoro di Canicattini Bagni e su alcuni gioielli bizantini dell'altopiano acrense (Siracusa), in Bizantinistica, s. II, XII, 2010
- CUGNO S. A., Note per una storia della ricerca archeologica nei siti preistorici di Canicattini Bagni, in Floridia e dintorni, XI, Floridia 2011, pp. 38–44.
- CUGNO S. A., La necropoli protostorica di Contrada Cugno Case Vecchie, in IpoTESI di Preistoria. Rivista di contributi e studi di Preistoria e Protostoria, Vol. 4, n°2, Dipartimento di Archeologia - Università di Bologna 2011, pp. 47–62
- CUGNO S. A., Necropoli paleocristiane e chiese rupestri dell'altopiano acrense. La "Canicattini Cristiana" di Salvatore Carpinteri, in Medieval Sophia. Studi e ricerche sui saperi medievali, 12, luglio-dicembre 2012, Officina degli Studi Medievali di Palermo, pp. 52–87.
- CULTRERA G., Cratere con scena fliacica di giuco d’altalena, in Dioniso, V, 1935–36, pp. 199–205.
- FICARA V., Genesi e sviluppo della città, in Canicattini Bagni. Storia arte tradizioni, Papa M. (a cura di), G.A.L. Val d’Anapo, Canicattini Bagni 2001, pp. 8–41.
- FICARA V., Cava Ddieri, in Notiziario storico di Canicattini, I, Canicattini Bagni 2004, pp. 50–52.
- FIORELLI G., Canicattini, in NSc, 1879, p. 160.
- FRASCA M., Canicattini Bagni, in Bibliografia Topografica della colonizzazione greca in Italia e nelle isole tirreniche, Nenci G.-Vallet G. (a cura di), IV, Roma 1985, pp. 350–354.
- FÜHRER J. F. - SCHULTZE V., Die altchristlichen Grabstätten Siziliens, Berlin 1907.
- GARANA O., Le catacombe siciliane e i loro martiri, Palermo 1961.
- LIBERTINI G., Il grande cratere di Canicattini del Museo di Siracusa, in BdA, XXXV, 1950, pp. 97–107.
- MESSINA A., Le chiese rupestri del Siracusano, Palermo 1979.
- MIRISOLA R. – POLACCO L., Contributi alla paleogeografia di Siracusa e del territorio siracusano (VIII-V sec. a.C.), in Memorie dell’Istituto Veneto di Scienze, Lettere ed Arti, LXVI, Venezia 1996.
- ORSI P., Canicattini, in NSc, 1895, pp. 238–239.
- ORSI P., Canicattini Bagni. Gruppi cemeteriali cristiani e bizantini, in NSc, 1905, pp. 425–427.
- ORSI P., Sicilia Bizantina, Tivoli 1942 (ristampa Catania 2000).
- PICONE E. G., Contributi per la topografia archeologica del Siracusano, in ArchStorSir, n.s. II, 1972–73, pp. 61–74.
- TINÉ S., Giacimenti dell’Età del Rame in Sicilia e la « Cultura tipo Conca d’Oro », in BPI, LXIX-LXX, 1960–61, pp. 116–119.
- TINÉ S., Gli scavi nella Grotta della Chiusazza, in BPI, LXXIV, 1965, pp. 123–247.
