= Mazzarrà Sant'Andrea =

- Comune
- Comune di Mazzarrà Sant'Andrea
- Location within Italy Location within Sicily
- Coordinates: 38°5′N 15°8′E
- Country: Italy
- Region: Sicily
- Metropolitan city: Messina (ME)

Government
  - Mayor: Commissars

Area
  - Total: 6.6 km^{2} (2.5 sq mi)
- Elevation: 110 m (360 ft)

Population (30 November 2011)
  - Total: 1,580
  - Density: 240/km^{2} (620/sq mi)
- Demonym: Mazzarresi
- Time zone: UTC+1 (CET)
  - Summer (DST): UTC+2 (CEST)
- Postal code: 98056
- Dialing code: 0941
- Website: Official website

Mazzarrà Sant'Andrea is a comune (municipality) in the Metropolitan City of Messina in the Italian region Sicily, located about 150 kilometres (93 mi) east of Palermo and about 40 kilometres (25 mi) southwest of Messina. Mazzarrà Sant'Andrea borders the following municipalities: Furnari, Novara di Sicilia, Rodì Milici, Terme Vigliatore, Tripi.

== Public transport ==
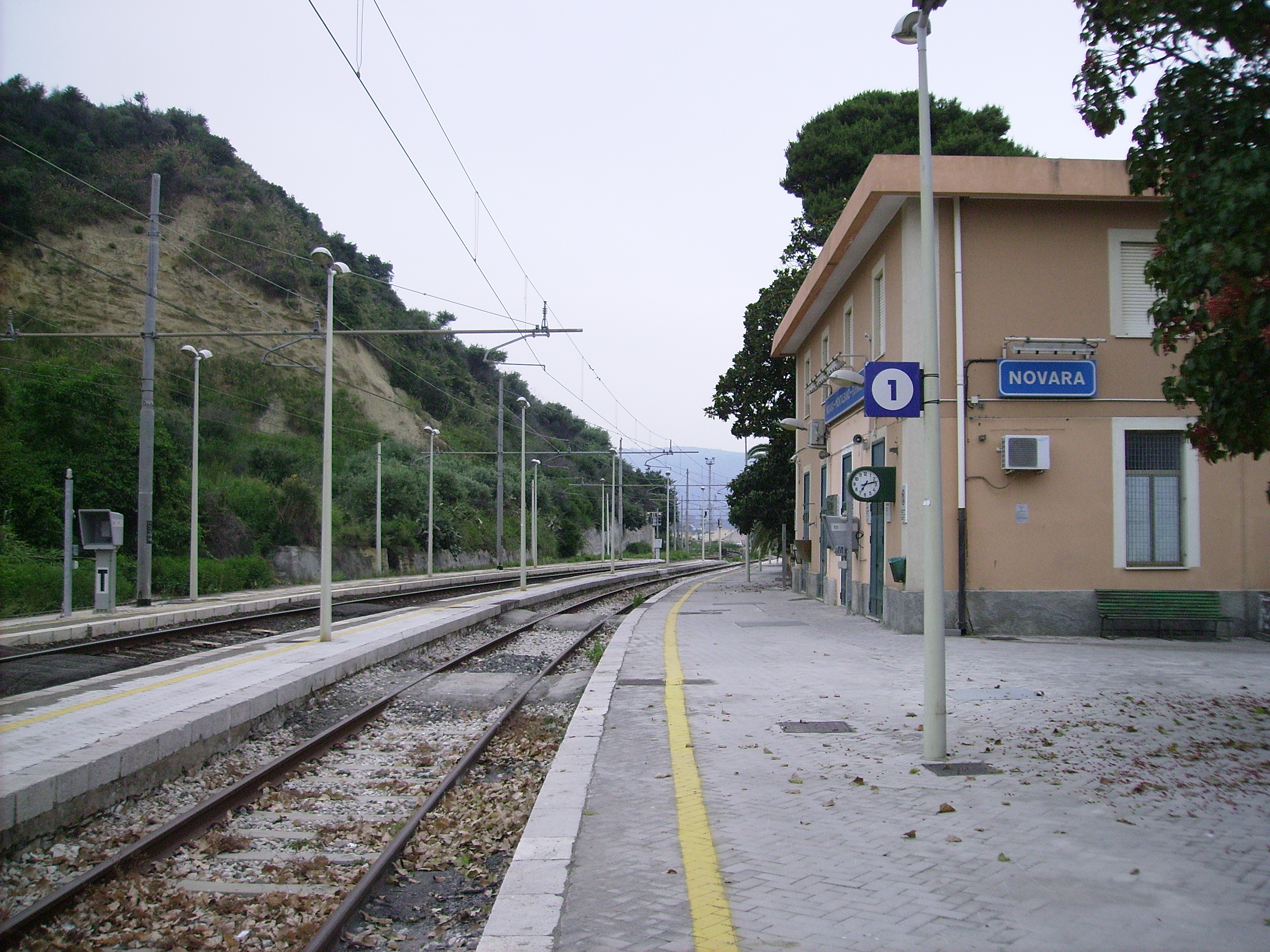
Novara-Montalbano-Furnari railway station

=== Railways ===
Novara-Montalbano-Furnari railway station is on the Palermo–Messina railway. It is served by trains run by Trenitalia, including services from Messina.

=== Bus and tram ===
Mazzarrà Sant'Andrea is served by bus provided from Azienda Siciliana Trasporti.
