= Buccheri =

Buccheri Voukòli (Greek)
- Comune
- Comune di Buccheri
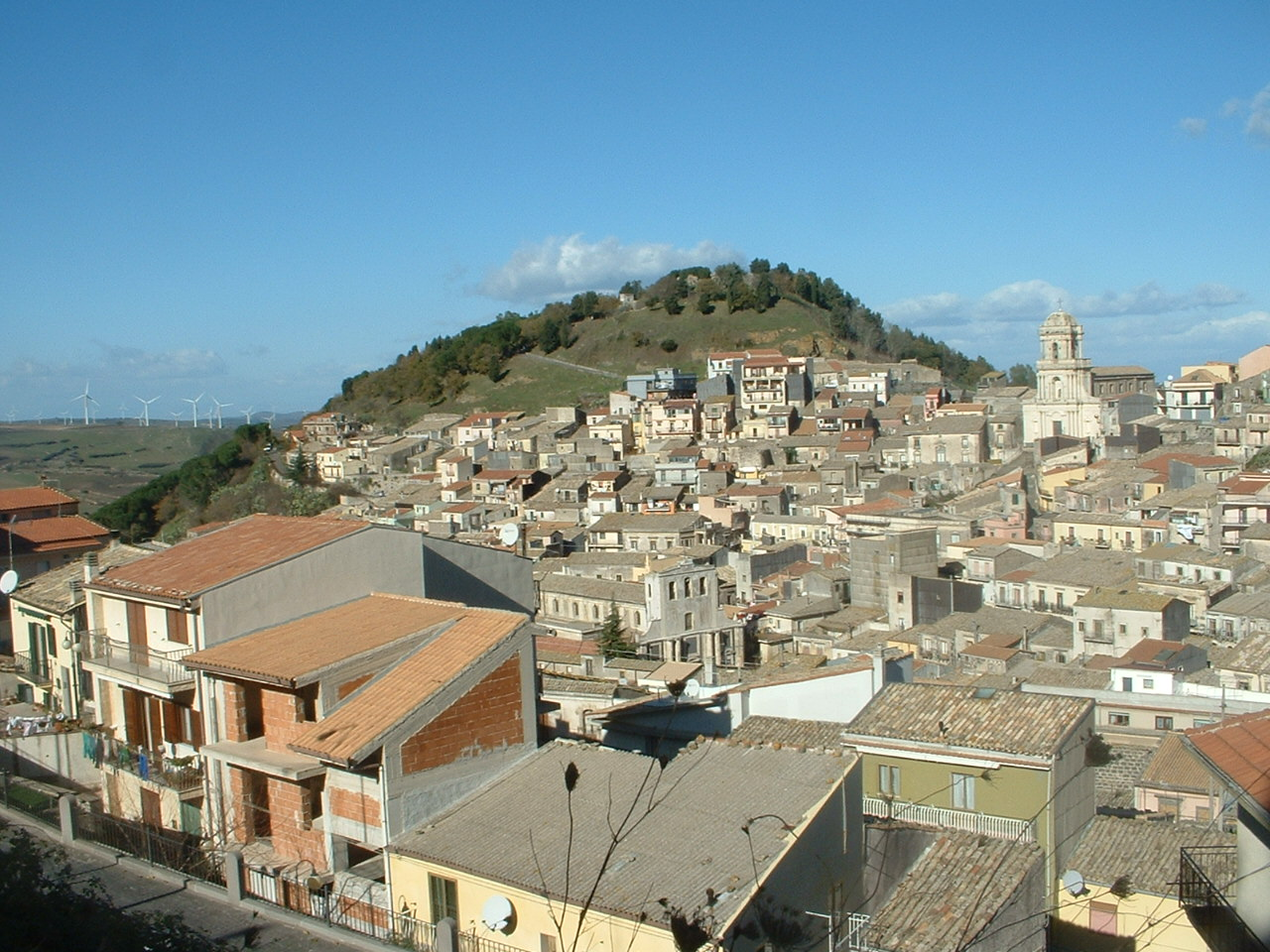

- Location within Italy Location within Sicily
- Coordinates: 37°7′30″N 14°51′7″E
- Country: Italy
- Region: Sicily
- Province: Syracuse (SR)

Government
  - Mayor: Alessandro Caiazzo

Area
  - Total: 57.43 km^{2} (22.17 sq mi)
- Elevation: 820 m (2,690 ft)

Population (30 November 2017)
  - Total: 1,955
  - Density: 34.04/km^{2} (88.17/sq mi)
- Demonym: Buccheresi
- Time zone: UTC+1 (CET)
  - Summer (DST): UTC+2 (CEST)
- Postal code: 96010
- Dialing code: 0931
- Patron saint: Saint Ambrose
- Saint day: 7 December
- Website: Official website

Buccheri is a town and comune in the Province of Syracuse, Sicily (southern Italy). It is one of I Borghi più belli d'Italia ("The most beautiful villages of Italy").
