= Vita, Sicily =

Vita
- Comune
- Comune di Vita
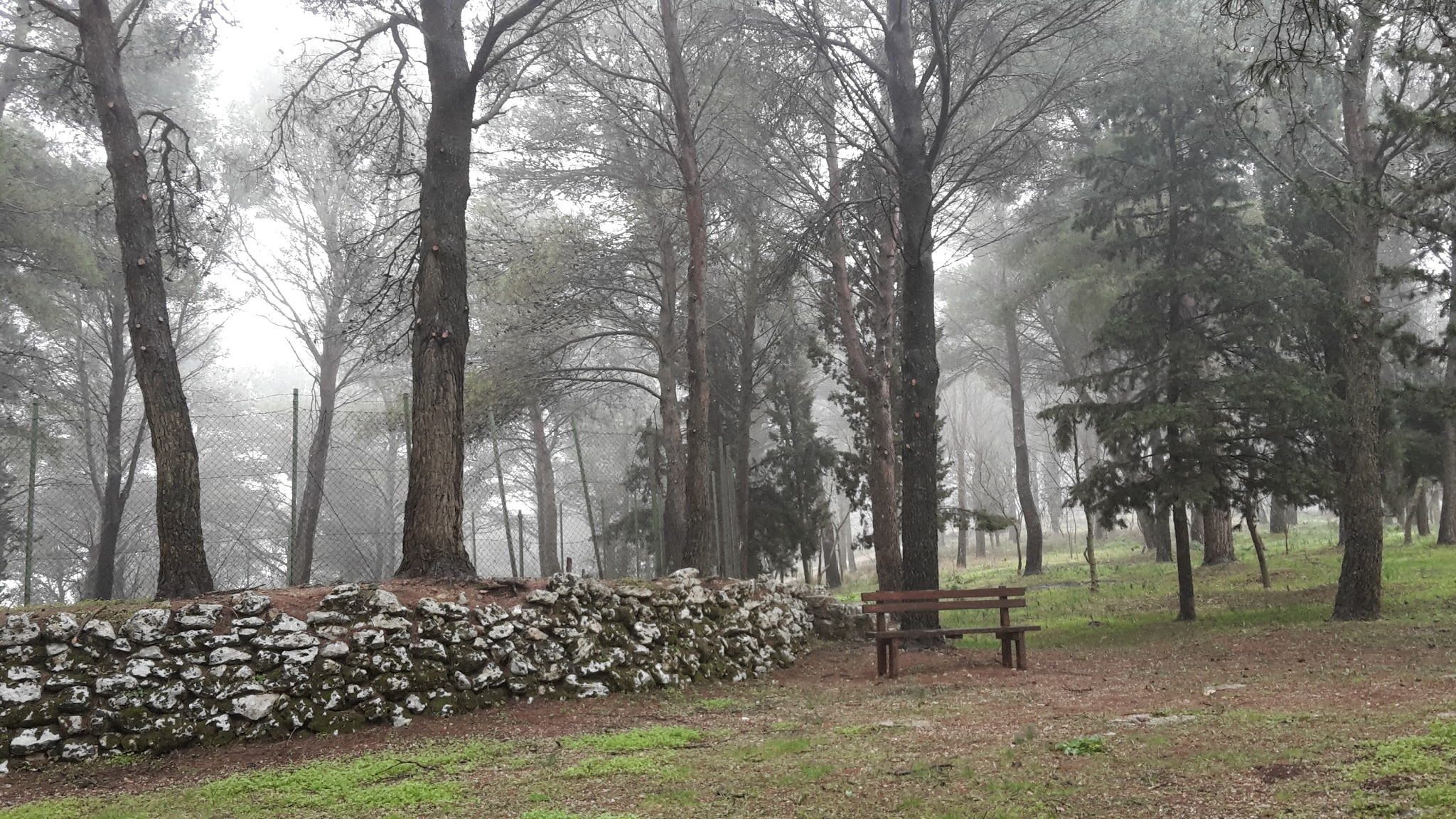

- Location within Italy Location within Sicily
- Coordinates: 37°52′N 12°49′E
- Country: Italy
- Region: Sicily
- Province: Trapani (TP)

Government
  - Mayor: Giuseppa Mascaretta (Lista Civica Uniti per Vita -Mascaretta sindaco)

Area
  - Total: 8.88 km^{2} (3.43 sq mi)
- Elevation: 480 m (1,570 ft)

Population (2001)
  - Total: 2,435
  - Density: 274/km^{2} (710/sq mi)
- Demonym: Vitesi
- Time zone: UTC+1 (CET)
  - Summer (DST): UTC+2 (CEST)
- Postal code: 91010
- Dialing code: 0924

Vita is a town and comune in inland south-western Sicily, Italy, administratively part of the province of Trapani. It is the smallest municipality area of the province of Trapani at about 8.88 square kilometres (3.43 mi^{2}). It is also characterized by the second highest elevation in the province, after Erice.

The town was founded in the early 17th century, under the Spaniards, by a noble from Calatafimi, Vito Sicomo. The birth of the township was then ratified by King Philip III of Spain on March 11, 1607.

In 1860, the town gave its full support to the Mille led by Giuseppe Garibaldi. In the early 20th century, the city reached its highest population, with c. 6,000 inhabitants. More recently, its inhabitants have slowly left the town in order to move towards Northern Italy and foreign countries, with possibly its largest emigrant community located in Toronto, Ontario, Canada. Vita was heavily damaged by the 1968 Belice earthquake, and rebuilt in a new urban zone, close to the old one.

The derivation of the name is uncertain: it is possibly associated with the founder's name, but might either be of Arab origin (there is a town named Vita in Algeria too), or even somehow associated with the same Italian word, which means life.

== Sources ==
- (in Italian) History of Vita
