= Bompensiere =

- Comune
- Comune di Bompensiere
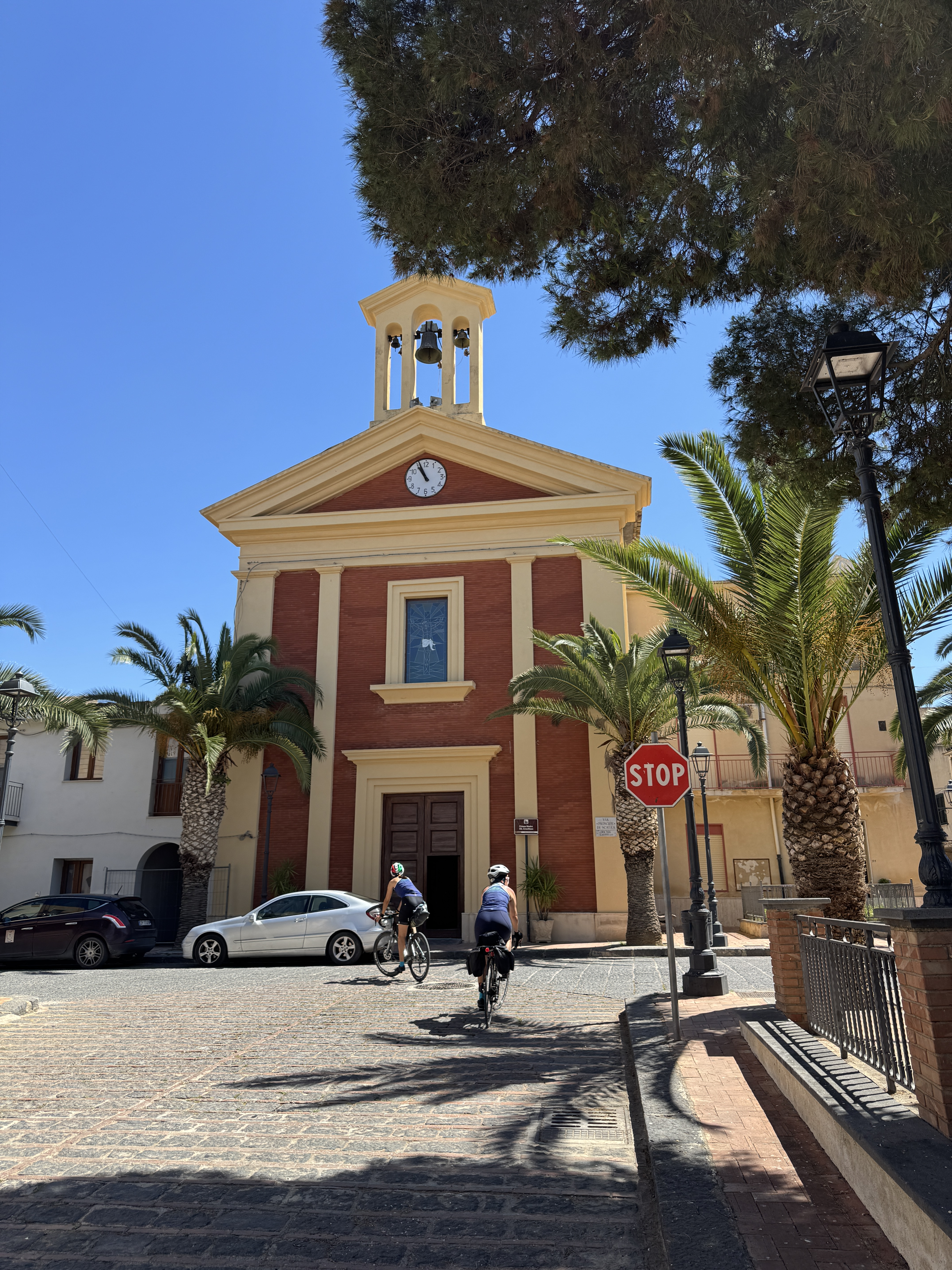
- Church of Santissimo Crocifisso

- Location of Bompensiere in Italy Bompensiere (Sicily)
- Coordinates: 37°28′N 13°47′E
- Country: Italy
- Region: Sicily
- Province: Caltanissetta (CL)

Area
  - Total: 19 km^{2} (7.3 sq mi)

Population (2007)
  - Total: 630
  - Density: 33/km^{2} (86/sq mi)
- Time zone: UTC+1 (CET)
  - Summer (DST): UTC+2 (CEST)

Bompensiere (Sicilian: Naduri) is a comune in the province of Caltanissetta in the south of Sicily, Italy.

== Physical geography ==
=== Territory ===
The municipal territory is located almost at the center of Sicily, in a hilly area whose average height above sea level is 290 meters. It extends on a slope of Mount Marrobio stretching from south-east to north-west for about one kilometer.

The town is arranged along a single main street on whose sides the houses are divided, almost uniformly distributed. The lowest point of the town is to the north-west, at an altitude of about 270 meters above sea level (Piana Giarre); the highest point is located in the south-east at an altitude of about 320 meters above sea level (Contrada Portella).
