= Milena, Sicily =

Milena
- Comune
- Comune di Milena
- Location within Italy Location within Sicily
- Coordinates: 37°28′N 13°44′E
- Country: Italy
- Region: Sicily
- Province: Caltanissetta (CL)

Government
  - Mayor: Claudio Cipolla

Area
  - Total: 24.5 km^{2} (9.5 sq mi)
- Elevation: 423 m (1,388 ft)

Population (31 July 2021)
  - Total: 2 775
  - Density: 0.082/km^{2} (0.21/sq mi)
- Demonym: Milenesi ("Milucchisi" in local dialect)
- Time zone: UTC+1 (CET)
  - Summer (DST): UTC+2 (CEST)
- Postal code: 93010
- Dialing code: 0934
- Patron saint: Saint Joseph
- Saint day: March 19
- Website: Official website

Milena (Sicilian: Milocca) is a comune (municipality) in the Province of Caltanissetta in the Italian region Sicily, located about 80 kilometres (50 miles) southeast of Palermo and about 30 kilometres (19 miles) west of Caltanissetta.

== Etymology ==
Formerly known as Milocca. Its name is a form of homage to the Queen Milena of Montenegro, the mother of the Queen Elena, wife of King Victor Emmanuel III of Italy.

== History and culture ==
Milena, formerly known as Milocca, was the subject of a book, named "Milocca: A Sicilian Village" by Charlotte Gower Chapman, who in 1935 detailed everyday life in the small rural Sicilian town, one of the earliest cultural anthropology studies of a semi-literate people.

== Archaeology ==
The area of Milena, nestled amidst mountains and river valleys, has a rich history dating back to the middle Neolithic.

Archaeological exploration in the vicinity during the 1980s and 1990s has revealed prehistoric sites, but many ancient settlements remain undiscovered due to the area's size and erosion risks.

Modern methods like remote sensing and GIS technology are now aiding these efforts. Challenges include erosion and vegetation cover, prompting the use of drones and remote sensing to uncover hidden archaeological sites.

== Twin towns ==
Milena is twinned with:

- Aix-les-Bains, France
