= Favara, Sicily =

Favara
- Comune
- Comune di Favara
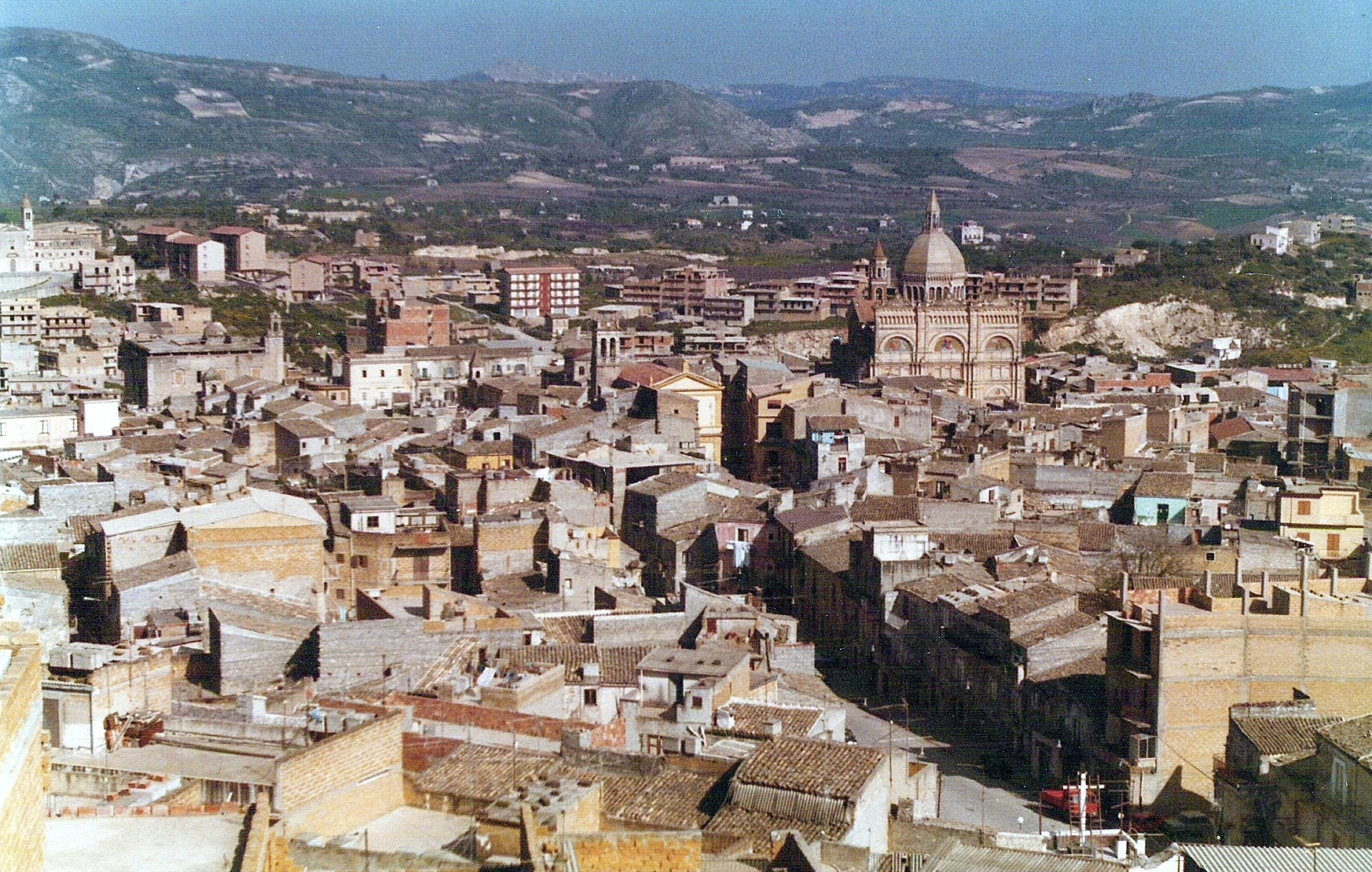
- Panorama of Favara

- Coat of arms

- Location of the municipality of Favara in the province of Agrigento

- Location within Italy Location within Sicily
- Coordinates: 37°19′07″N 13°39′47″E
- Country: Italy
- Region: Sicily
- Province: Agrigento (AG)
- Frazioni: Quattro Strade

Government
  - Mayor: Antonio Palumbo

Area
  - Total: 81.88 km^{2} (31.61 sq mi)
- Elevation: 338 m (1,109 ft)

Population (1-1-2021)
  - Total: 31,821
  - Density: 388.6/km^{2} (1,007/sq mi)
- Demonym: Favarese(i)
- Time zone: UTC+1 (CET)
  - Summer (DST): UTC+2 (CEST)
- Postal code: 92026
- Dialing code: 0922
- Patron saint: St. Anthony of Padua
- Saint day: June 13
- Website: Official website

Favara (Italian: [faˈvaːra], Sicilian: [faˈvaːɾa]) is a town and comune (municipality) of south central Sicily, Italy, in the province of Agrigento, 8 kilometres (5 mi) north-east of Agrigento by road, with which it forms a conurbation.

Historically, the town has had a considerable agricultural trade, and there are sulfur and other mines in the neighborhood.

It is regionally famous for the "Easter Lamb", a local pastry produced there from almonds and pistachios.

== Territory ==
The town is located on the slope of a 533 m hill, Monte Caltafaraci, locally known as the Muntaggneḍḍa (little mountain in Sicilian). The average elevation is 338 m, with a minimum of 20 m and a maximum of 533 m. Favara is part of the agricultural region #5 Agrigento seaside hills (Italian: Colline litoranee di Agrigento). The local climate falls into the Csa category of the Köppen climate classification, i.e. a warm Mediterranean climate with hot and dry summers and temperate winters, with temperature rarely dropping below 0 °C.

== History ==
The first signs of human habitation of the area can be dated to the late copper age (2400-1990 a.C.), with monochrome red pottery in the Malpasso style found in a cave in contrada Ticchiara. An excavation of a later burial site (1900-1450 a.C.) from contrada Grazia Vicina has yielded gray achromatic ceramic with connection to the Conca d'Oro style (late copper age in the Palermo region) and to archaic forms of the Castelluccio style (early Bronze Age in central-southern Sicily). Another burial site has been identified in contrada San Vincenzo, which can be dated to the middle Bronze Age (around 1450 a.C.).

Remains of a fortification dating to the period of the Greek colonies in Sicily can be found in Contrada Caltafaraci. Following the Roman and Byzantine domination, the Saracen established themselves in Sicily in the 9th and 10th century. A settlement flourished in contrada Saraceno and many traces of their domination can still be found in the denomination of local geographical places. The name of the town itself originates from the Arabian fawwāra (Arabic: ﻓﻮﺍﺭة), meaning "Gurgling pool of water".

During the subsequent Norman domination several large structures were built, among others the Chiaramonte Castle, also known as the Medieval Palace. In the 14th century the castle passed to the Chiaramonte family, from which it took its current name. In the 15th century, although protected by city walls, the town underwent a period of population decline, especially between 1439 and 1464. This trend was reversed from 1478 to 1497. In the 16th century the efforts of the De Marinis family contributed to a greater development of Favara.

In the 19th century, in the background of the unification of Italy and up to 1883, Favara was the main hub of a large criminal organization known as Fratellanza di Favara.

In contemporary history, the mayor of Favara, Gaetano Guarino, was murdered on May 16, 1946, by unknown perpetrators.

Calogero Marrone (1889-1945), Righteous Among the Nations, was born and raised in Favara.

== Main sights ==
The town possesses a Castle of the 11th- to 15th-century noble Chiaramonte family, erected in 1280.

== Twin towns ==
- Andújar, Spain, since 2004
