= San Leone (river) =

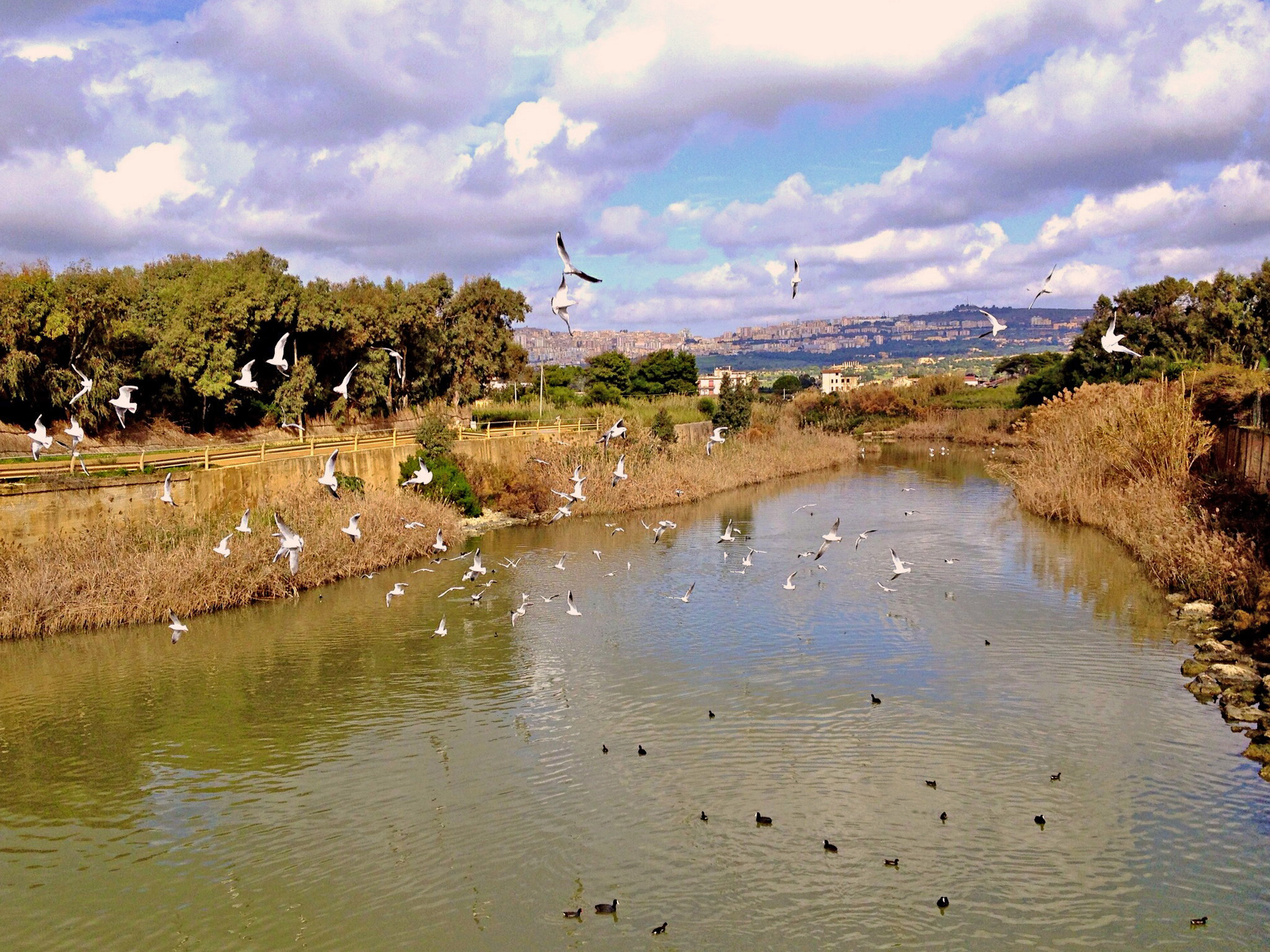

- Location in Sicily

Location
- Country: Italy
- Region: Sicily

Physical characteristics
- Mouth: Mediterranean Sea
  - location: San Leone
  - coordinates: 37.2644°N 13.5777°E
- Length: 26 km^{2} (10 sq mi)
- Basin size: 206 km^{2} (80 sq mi)

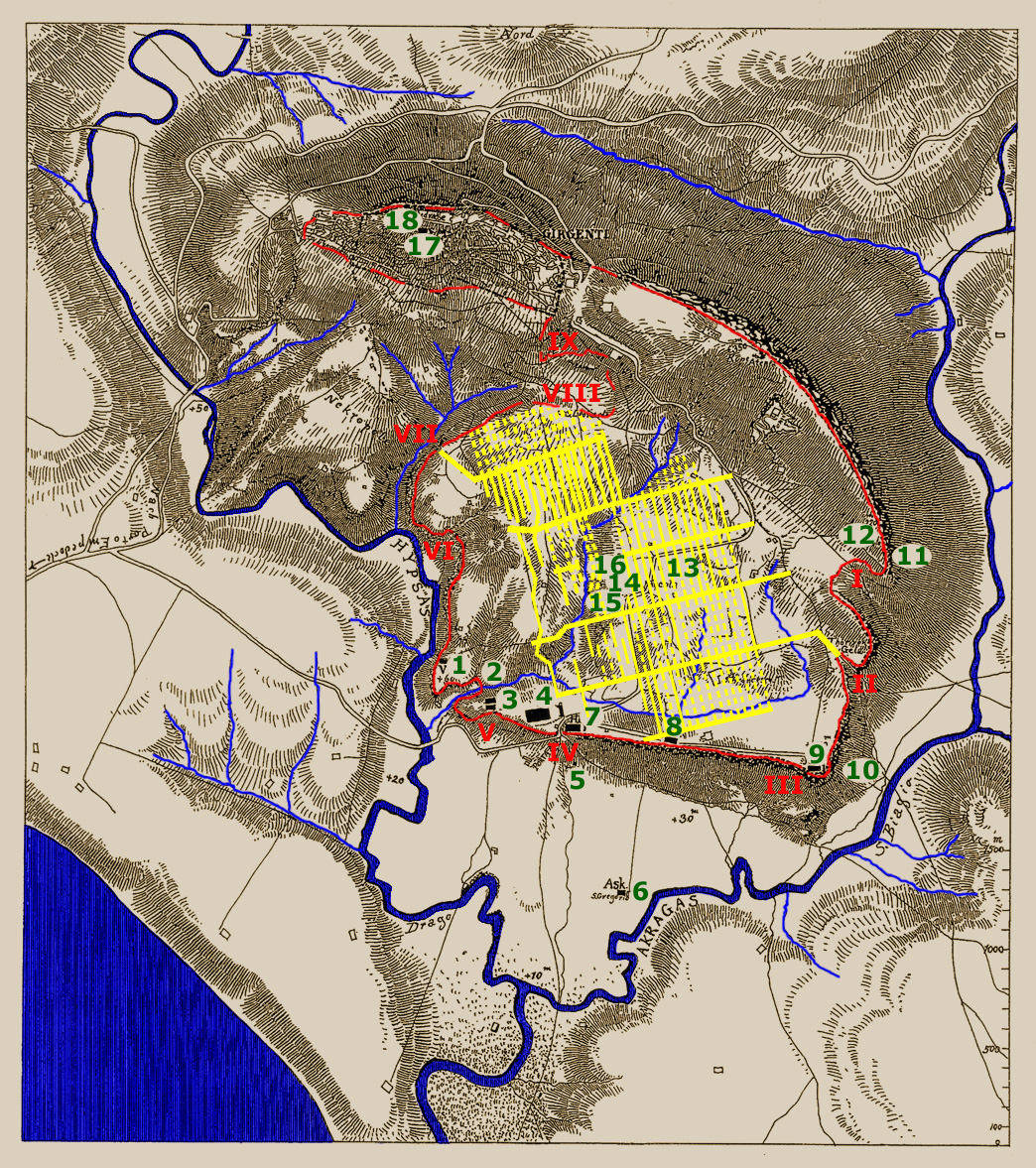
The Sant'Anna (or Drago) to the west, and the San Biagio to the east, join to form the Fiume San Leone south of the ancient site of Agrigento

The San Leone is a river in the Province of Agrigento, Sicily, Italy. Its main stream is 26 kilometres (16 mi) long, and it has a drainage basin of 206 square kilometres (80 sq mi). Its source is in the commune of Santa Elisabetta and it empties into the Mediterranean Sea in San Leone, a frazione of the city of Agrigento. It has various names along its course: at its source it is called Akragas, further downstream Drago, then Sant'Anna (the ancient Hypsas) and the final 3 km until its mouth San Leone. Its largest tributary is the San Biagio (also: San Benedetto). In the 19th century it was known as Fiume di Girgenti.
