= Hypsas =

Hypsas (Ὕψας) is the classical name of two rivers in Sicily:

- The San Leone (river), also known as the Sant'Anna or Drago, near Agrigento (in antiquity Akragas)
- The Belice, near the ancient city of Selinus, on the banks of which stood the ancient city of Inycum.
