= Aragona =

Commune in Sicily, Italy

Aragona Raona
- Comune
- Comune di Aragona
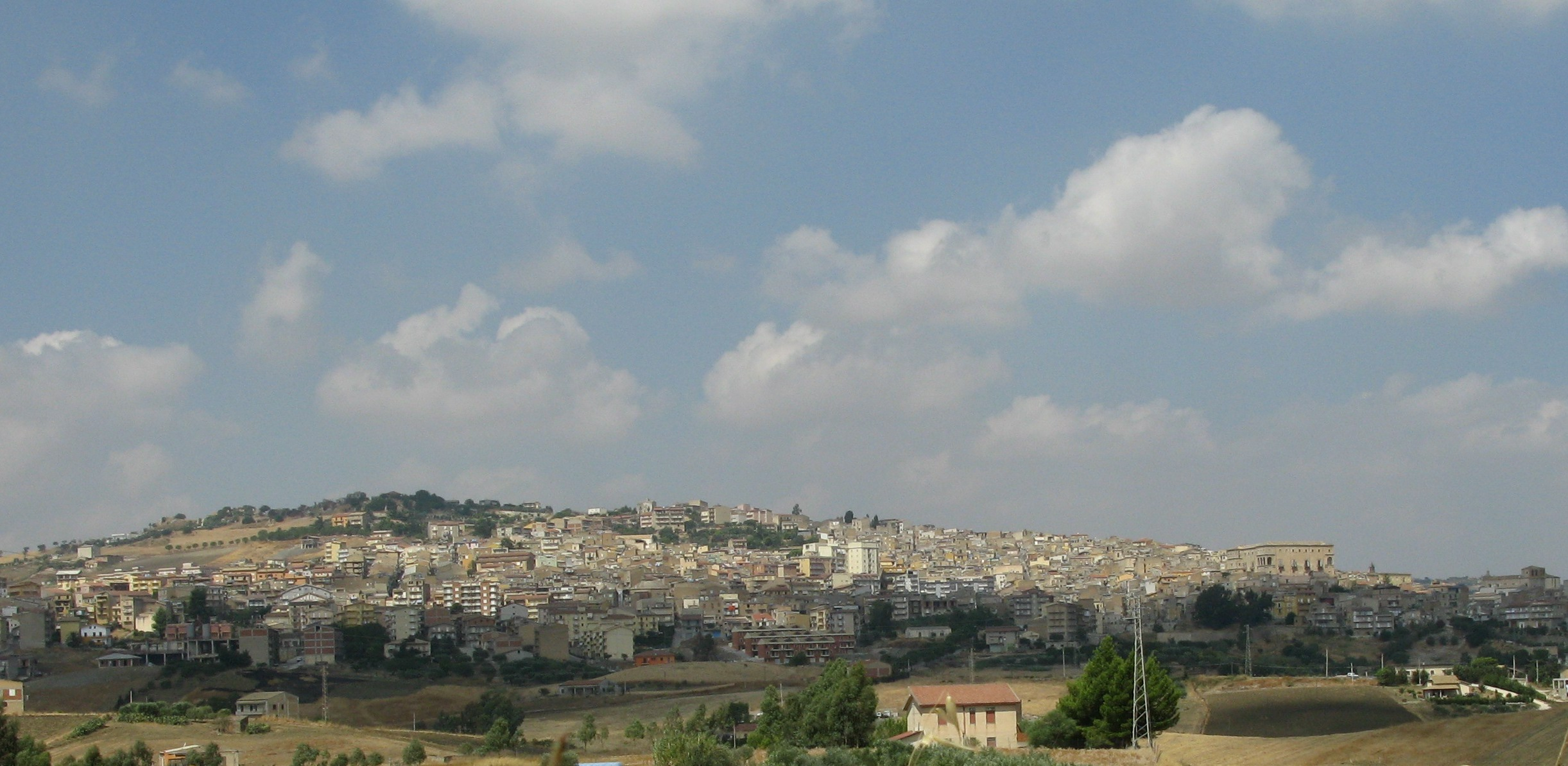
- View of Aragona

- Location of the municipality of Aragona in the province of Agrigento

- Location within Italy Location within Sicily
- Coordinates: 37°24′07″N 13°37′06″E
- Country: Italy
- Region: Sicily
- Province: Agrigento (AG)
- Frazioni: Aragona Caldare, Zorba

Government
  - Mayor: Giuseppe Pendolino

Area
  - Total: 74.7 km^{2} (28.8 sq mi)
- Elevation: 400 m (1,300 ft)

Population (30 April 2017)
  - Total: 9,411
  - Density: 126/km^{2} (326/sq mi)
- Demonym: Aragonesi
- Time zone: UTC+1 (CET)
  - Summer (DST): UTC+2 (CEST)
- Postal code: 92021
- Dialing code: 089
- Patron saint: Madonna del Rosario
- Saint day: October 7
- Website: Official website

Aragona (Sicilian: Araùna or Raona) is a commune in the province of Agrigento, Sicily, southern Italy. It is 16 kilometres (10 mi) northeast of Agrigento. It is known mainly for the Macalube natural reserve and for being the Italian municipality with the highest emigration rate.

== Geography ==
The sulfur mine Mandra, today inactive, is located in the municipality.

Aragona is part of the agricultural region Platani Hills (Italian: Colline del Platani).

Bounding communes are:

- Agrigento
- Campofranco
- Casteltermini
- Comitini
- Favara
- Grotte
- Joppolo Giancaxio
- Sant'Angelo Muxaro
- Santa Elisabetta

== History ==
Aragona is located on the eastern slopes of the Mount Belvedere at an altitude of 428 m. In the 13th century, the Castello di Barrugeri was built near what is now Aragona, but it no longer exists. The town was founded on 6 January 1606, upon the initiative of lord Baldassare III Naselli, Count of Comiso. He had previously submitted a request for the foundation of a new village in his fiefdom of Diesi during the 49th Extraordinary General Parliament, overseen by the Spanish viceroy Lorenzo Suarez de Figueroa e Cordoba on 2 August 1604, in Messina. On 6 September that year the viceroy ordered an official investigation into the matter, which eventually resulted on 6 January 1606 in the granting of a licentia populandi, i.e. the permission to increase the fief's population. The new village was named after the Count's mother, donna Beatrice Aragona Branciforti.

== Culture ==
=== Cinema ===
- In the 1950 Italian language drama film Path of Hope (Italian: Il Cammino della speranza) directed by Pietro Germi, Aragona is featured for a little over a minute, with a panoramic view of the historical city center, dominated by the Palace of the Naselli Princes, and part of the cemetery.
- In Aragona were filmed parts of the 1994 Italian language drama film Law of Courage (Italian: Il giudice ragazzino), directed by Alessandro Di Robilant about the life of Rosario Livatino, a magistrate murdered by the mafia in 1990.
- Between 1999 and 2000 the movie La Memoire aux Alouettes on the Marcinelle mines is filmed there.
- Aragona is featured in the 2009 movie Rehearsal for a Sicilian Tragedy (Italian: Prove per una tragedia siciliana) with and by John Turturro, which was presented at the 66th edition of the Venice Film Festival.

=== Television ===
Televideo Aragona.

=== Cuisine ===
The taganu is a dish cooked with Rigatoni, eggs and tuma (cheese) a typical local fresh, non-salted cheese made from sheep's milk. The name derives from the name of the pot in which it is cooked on the Holy Saturday, to be then consumed on Easter Monday. It is baked for two hours and can be eaten hot or cold. It is accompanied by a white wine.

Another typical dish of the local cuisine is the 'mbriulata, which consists of very thin bread dough filled with olives, caramelized onions, crumbled sausage, oil, salt and pepper. They are then rolled into the form of a bun and placed in the oven for 40 minutes.

== Main sights ==
=== In Aragona ===
- The 17th century Prince Palace in Piazza Umberto I. The City Hall was located there before it moved to its current location in via Roma 161, Aragona's central street.
- The Church of the Rosario in piazza Umberto I, built in 1689.
- The Mother Church of Nostra Signora dei Tre Re (Our Lady of the Three Kings) in piazza Matrice, built in 1606.

=== Near Aragona ===
- The Natural Reserve Macalube of Aragona (singular macaluba, from Arabic مقلوبة maqlūbah, '(a land) that turns over', from the verb قلب qalaba 'to turn over, turn upside down, invert') is the site of a particular and rare phenomenon of sedimentary volcanism. It is located 4 km SO of Aragona and 15 km North of Agrigento. The reserve proper extends over 93 ha and only research activities or authorized guided tours can be performed there. A buffer area of 163 ha surrounds the reserve and it is open to visitors.
- Archeological remains of a Roman Villa in contrada Fontanazza.
- The Salto D’Angio Tower, 5 km north of Aragona, which also offer a panoramic view of the surrounding area.

== People ==
- The mother of brothers John Turturro and Nicholas Turturro is from Aragona.
- Dominique Fidanza, former member of the Lollipop.
- Vincenzo Scifo, Belgian football player
- Pietro Zammuto, football player
- Alfonso Russo, the grandfather of Alessia Russo

== Transportation ==
There is a railroad station located in Aragona Caldare.

== Twin towns ==
- La Louvière, Belgium, since 2010
