= Giovanni Guarino Amella =

Italian politician and lawyer (1872–1949)

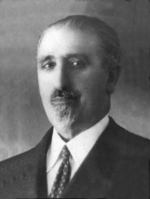

Member of the Chamber of Deputies of the Kingdom of Italy
- In office 1919 – 9 November 1926

Member of the National Council
- In office 25 September 1945 – 24 June 1946

Personal details
- Born: 8 October 1872 Sant'Angelo Muxaro, Province of Girgenti, Kingdom of Italy
- Died: 19 October 1949 (aged 77) Palermo, Italy
- Party: Social Democracy; Labour Democratic Party
- Profession: Lawyer

Giovanni Guarino Amella (8 October 1872 – 19 October 1949) was an Italian politician and lawyer who served as a member of the Chamber of Deputies of the Kingdom of Italy during the 25th, 26th and 27th legislatures. He was also elected president of the Province of Girgenti in 1911. He later served as a member of the National Council from September 1945 to June 1946.
