= List of presidents of the Province of Agrigento =

President of the Province of Agrigento
- Presidente della Provincia di Agrigento; Presidente del Libero consorzio comunale di Agrigento
- Incumbent; Giuseppe Pendolino since 28 April 2025
- Inaugural holder: Vincenzo Coniglio
- Formation: 1889

The president of the Province of Agrigento was the head of the provincial administration of Agrigento, a local government authority in Sicily, Italy. Since 2025, the chairman of the provincial administration is the president of the Free Municipal Consortium (Libero consorzio comunale).

== List ==
=== Presidents of the Provincial Deputation (1889–1927) ===
No.	Portrait	Name	Term of office		Party
No.	Portrait	Name	Start	End	Party
1		Vincenzo Coniglio	1889	1892	?
2		Pietro Demichele Fleres	1893	1894	?
3		Vitale Cognata	1894	1902	?
4		Giuseppe Ruggiero	1903	1906	?
5		Giuseppe Vullo	1906	1907	?
6		Ignazio Genuardi	1907	1909	?
(4)		Giuseppe Ruggiero	1909	1911	?
7		Giovanni Guarino Amella	1911	?	?

=== Presidents of the Province (1947–2013) ===
Portrait	Name	Term of office		Party
Portrait	Name	Start	End	Party
	?	?	?	?
	Ignazio Cantone	?	13 July 1990	Christian Democracy
	Stefano Cusumano	13 July 1990	10 February 1992	Christian Democracy
	Emanuele Siragusa	10 February 1992	2 April 1993	Christian Democracy
	Maria Camilla Nicosia Caruselli	2 April 1993	29 June 1994	Christian Democracy
	Stefano Vivacqua	29 June 1994	25 May 1998	Italian Socialist Party
	Vincenzo Fontana	25 May 1998	27 May 2003	Forza Italia
	Vincenzo Fontana	28 May 2003	12 February 2008	Forza Italia
	Letizia Di Liberti (Regional commissioner)	17 March 2008	17 June 2008	—
	Eugenio D'Orsi	17 June 2008	18 June 2013	Independent (centre-right)

=== Regional commissioners (2013–2025) ===
Name	Term of office	
Name	Start	End
Benito Infurnari	18 June 2013	31 October 2014
Vincenzo Lauro	31 October 2014	1 December 2014
Alessandra Di Liberto	1 December 2014	8 April 2015
Vincenzo Lauro	8 April 2015	24 April 2015
Marcello Maisano	24 April 2015	23 March 2016
Roberto Barbieri	23 March 2016	11 April 2017
Giuseppe Marino	11 April 2017	30 January 2018
Girolamo Alberto Di Pisa	30 January 2018	30 April 2021
Vincenzo Raffo	30 April 2021	28 April 2025

=== Presidents of the Free Municipal Consortium (2025–present) ===
No.	Portrait	Name	Term of office		Party
No.	Portrait	Name	Start	End	Party
1		Giuseppe Pendolino	28 April 2025	Incumbent	Italia Viva

== Sources ==
- "Storia amministrativa dell'ente". Ministero dell'Interno.
- Menichini, Piera (2005). "I presidenti delle Province dall'Unità alla Grande guerra: repertorio analitico". Storia Amministrazione Costituzione (13): 253–254.
