= Santo Stefano Quisquina =

- Comune
- Comune di Santo Stefano Quisquina
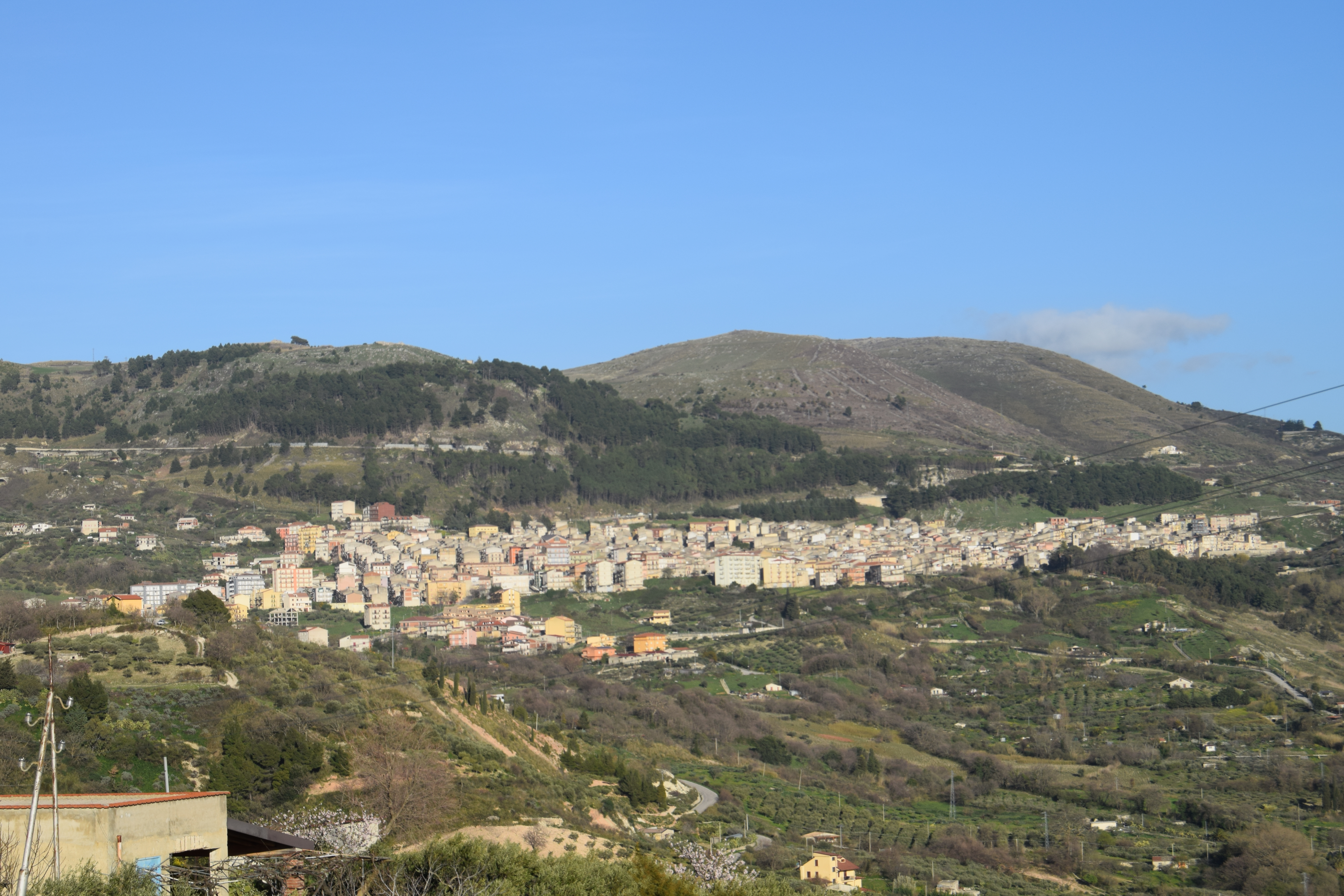
- View of Santo Stefano Quisquina

- Location within Italy Location within Sicily
- Coordinates: 37°37′N 13°29′E
- Country: Italy
- Region: Sicily
- Province: Agrigento (AG)

Government
  - Mayor: Francesco Cacciatore

Area
  - Total: 85.9 km^{2} (33.2 sq mi)
- Elevation: 730 m (2,400 ft)

Population (30 November 2016)
  - Total: 4,614
  - Density: 53.7/km^{2} (139/sq mi)
- Demonym(s): Stefanesi (also Quisquinesi, Quisquinensi or Timpanisi)
- Time zone: UTC+1 (CET)
  - Summer (DST): UTC+2 (CEST)
- Postal code: 92020
- Dialing code: 0922
- Website: Official website

Santo Stefano Quisquina (Sicilian: Santu Stèfanu Quisquina) is a comune (municipality) in the Province of Agrigento in the Italian region Sicily, located about 60 kilometres (37 mi) south of Palermo and about 35 kilometres (22 mi) north of Agrigento.

It has strong ties with Tampa, in the United States, since its immigrants supplied over 60 percent of the Italian population of the city in the late 19th and early 20th century.

Santo Stefano Quisquina stands at an altitude of 730 metres (2,400 ft) above sea level and borders the following municipalities: Alessandria della Rocca, Bivona, Cammarata, Casteltermini, Castronovo di Sicilia, San Biagio Platani.

== History ==
The first nucleus of the present-day town probably dates back to the reign of Frederick II of Aragon (1296–1337), when it was a fief of Giovanni Caltagirone. Its successive lords were Ruggero Sinisi, Guiscardo de Agijas, the Lacarns and the Ventimiglias.

== People ==
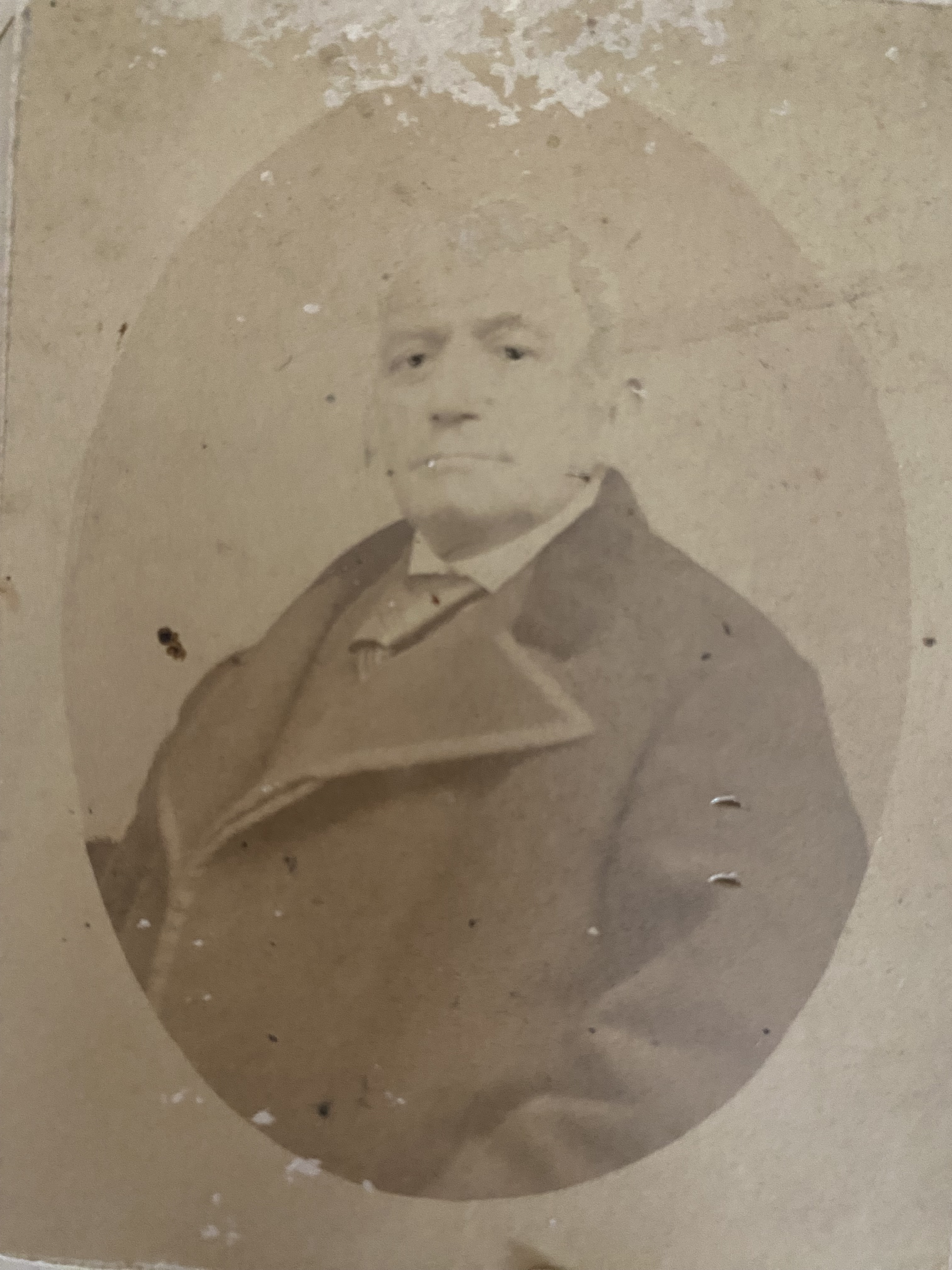
Possibly the earliest born Quisquinese and maybe earliest born Sicilian ever photographed, Giuseppe Giovenco (1798-1881)

- Lorenzo Panepinto (1865 - 1911), a teacher and peasant leader killed by the Sicilian Mafia.
