= Alessandria della Rocca =

Alessandria della Rocca Alessandria della Pietra (Italian)
- Comune
- Comune di Alessandria della Rocca
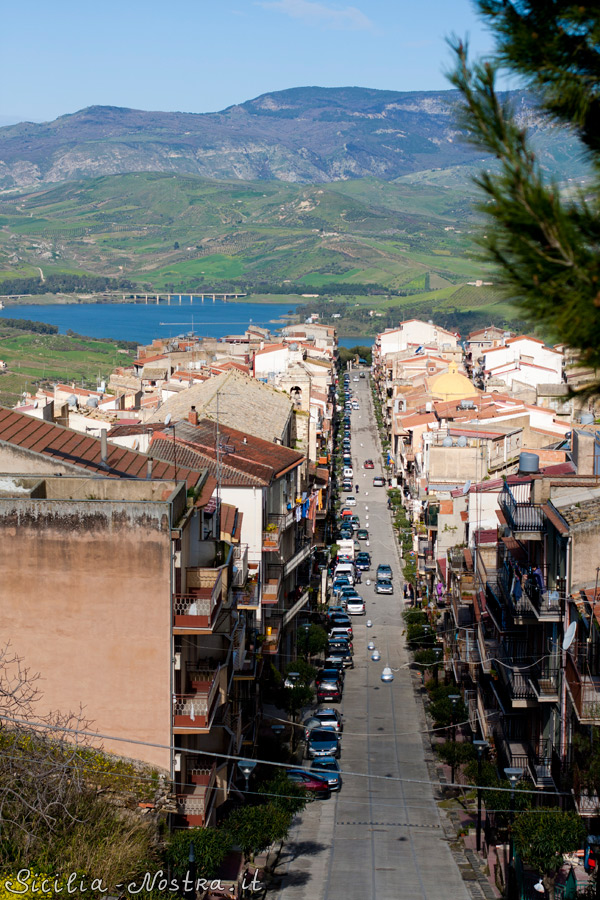
- panoramic view

- Coat of arms

- Location of Alessandria della Rocca in Italy Alessandria della Rocca (Sicily)
- Coordinates: 37°34′N 13°27′E
- Country: Italy
- Region: Sicily
- Province: Agrigento (AG)

Government
  - Mayor: Salvatore Mangione (lista civica Alessandria futura)

Area
  - Total: 62.24 km^{2} (24.03 sq mi)
- Elevation: 533 m (1,749 ft)

Population (31 December 2024)
  - Total: 2,350
  - Density: 37.8/km^{2} (97.8/sq mi)
- Demonym: Alessandrini
- Time zone: UTC+1 (CET)
  - Summer (DST): UTC+2 (CEST)
- Postal code: 92010
- Dialing code: 0922
- Patron saint: Maria SS. della Rocca
- Saint day: Last Sunday in August
- Website: Official website

Alessandria della Rocca (Sicilian: Lixiànnira dâ Ṛocca) is a municipality of 2,350 inhabitants of the free municipal consortium of Agrigento and small agricultural town located in the west central Sicily, southern Italy. It borders the municipalities of Bivona, Cianciana, San Biagio Platani, Sant'Angelo Muxaro and Santo Stefano Quisquina.

== Physical Geography ==
=== Climate ===
The climate is Mediterranean, with average temperatures of 26-28°C in July and August and highs of 30-40°C. Climate classification: zone C, 1311 days.

== History ==
The remains of the 14th century Castello della Pietra d'Amico can be found about 5 km (3.1 mi) away from the town. The town itself was founded in 1570 by Don Carlo Blasco Barresi, and was initially called Pietra d'Amico after the castle. In 1713, it was renamed Alessandria di Sicilia, while the present name Alessandria della Rocca was adopted by Royal Decree on 7 November 1862.

The municipal coat of arms is inspired by the coats of arms of the noble Sicilian families Barresi (of silver and gules minute vair, with three gold bars crossing) and Di Napoli (azure, with a gold lion, surmounted by the motto "Viro constanti" in black, in a band, with two gold stars and a lily of the same, placed in chapters 2 and 1).

== Monuments and places of interest ==
=== Religious architecture ===
- Church of Carmine (16th-17th century) and Carmelite convent. The latter was restored thanks to the intervention of the municipal administration headed by Mayor Salvatore Mangione (2000). Today, various cultural activities take place inside the cloister during the summer. The "Confraternity of Maria Santissima del Carmine" is located in the monumental complex.
- Mother Church (17th century);
- Church of the Immaculate Conception (17th century);
- Church of the Crucifix (17th century);
- Church of San Giovanni Battista (17th century);
- Church of the Convent of the Reformed Friars Minor (17th century);
- Sanctuary of the Madonna della Rocca (17th century).

=== Civil Architecture ===
- Genuardi-Inglese Palace (16th century)
- Guggino Palace (17th-18th century)
- Cordova Palace
- Genuardi Palace
- English-Spoto Palace
- Coniglio Palace
- Former Alessandria della Rocca station, renovated in 2016

=== Military architecture ===
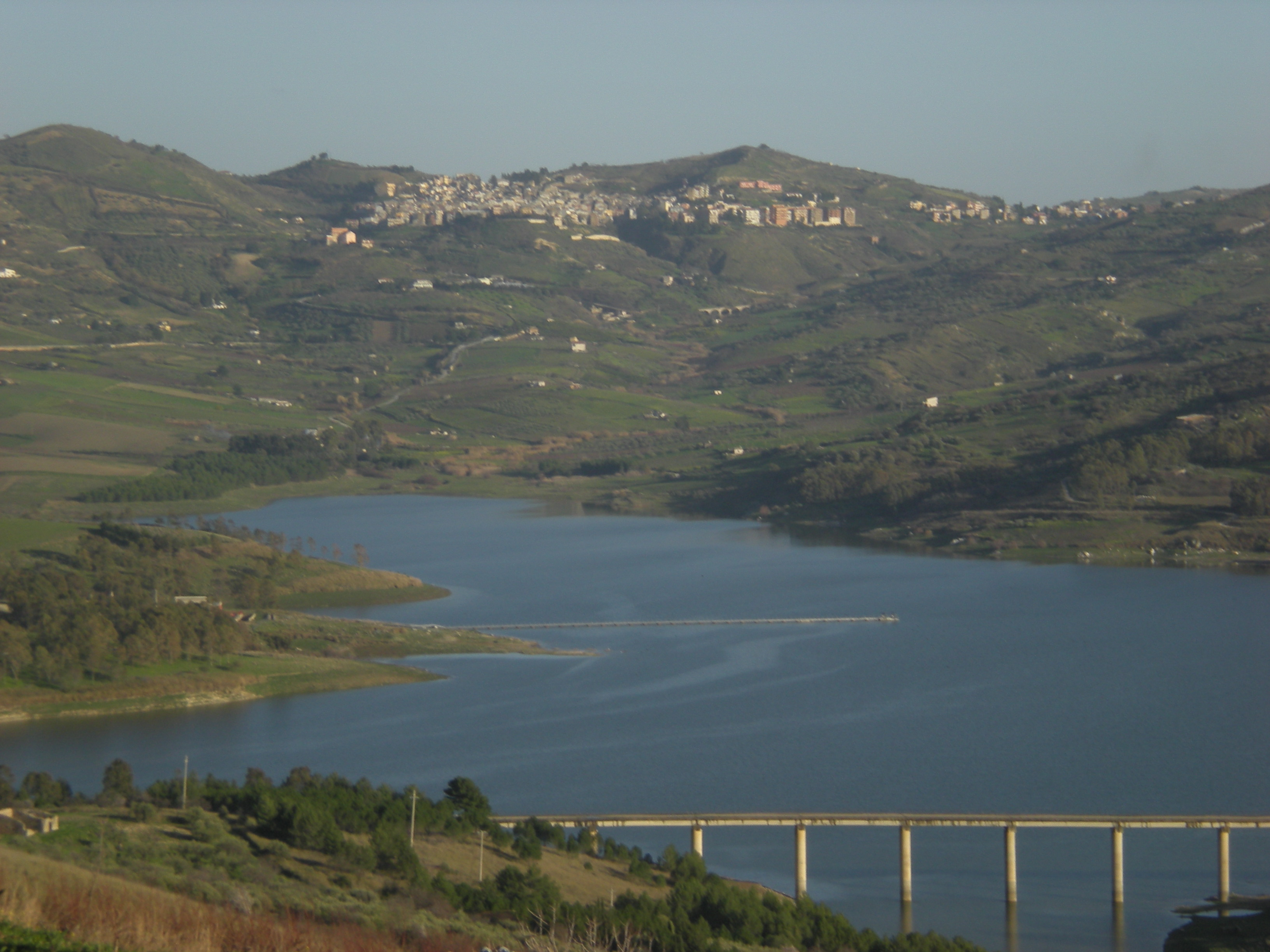
Castle dam

- Pietra d'Amico Castle.

== Demographic evolution ==
Historical population

Year	Pop.	±%
1861	4,978	—
1871	5,415	+8.8%
1881	5,797	+7.1%
1901	5,414	−6.6%
1911	5,082	−6.1%
1921	5,209	+2.5%

Year	Pop.	±%
1931	5,724	+9.9%
1936	6,112	+6.8%
1951	6,408	+4.8%
1961	5,820	−9.2%
1971	5,388	−7.4%
1981	5,281	−2.0%

Year	Pop.	±%
1991	5,153	−2.4%
2001	3,787	−26.5%
2011	3,118	−17.7%
2021	2,521	−19.1%

Source: Data from ISTAT

== Ethnic groups and foreign minorities ==
There were 41 foreigners residing in Alessandria della Rocca as of January 1, 2024, representing 1.7% of the resident population. The largest foreign community is that from Romania, with 82.9% of all foreigners present in the area.

== Culture ==
=== Education ===
- Municipal Library, located in Piazza Marconi.

=== Events ===
- Feast of the Madonna della Rocca - last Sunday in August (from the previous Friday to the following Tuesday)
- Feast of St. Joseph - March 19
- Mediterranean Music Festival (last week of August)
- Feast in honor of St. John the Baptist (June 24)
- 1° Mènnula Fest

== Administration ==
Period		Office holder	Party	Title	Notes
9 June 2024	in office	Salvatore Mangione	Lista civica "Alessandria futura"	Mayor	
