= Sant'Angelo Muxaro Patera =

Ancient Greek bowl

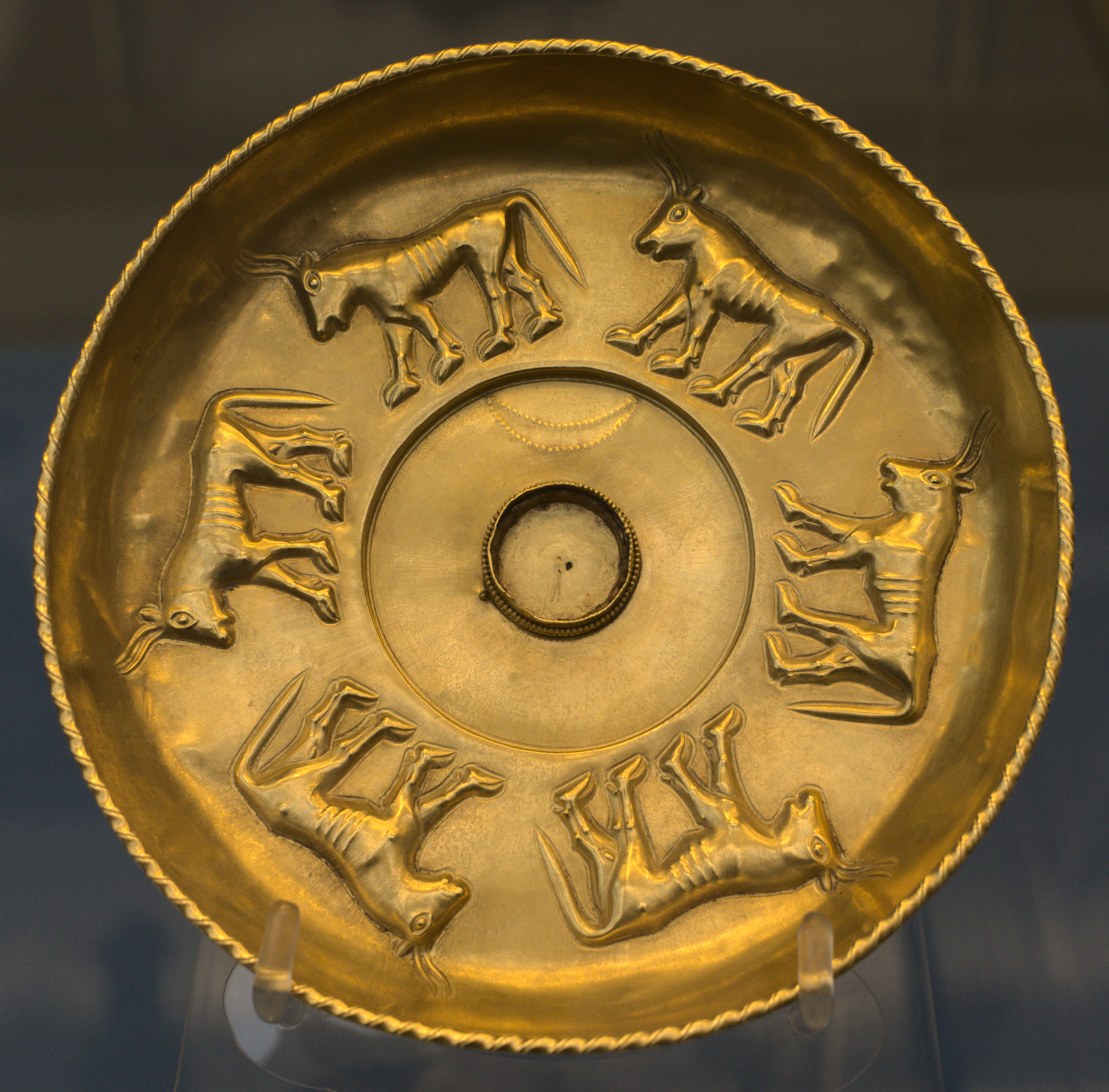
- Sant'Angelo Muxaro Patera on display in the British Museum
- Material: Gold
- Size: 14.6 cm diameter, 2.89 kg in weight
- Writing: Ancient Greek
- Created: 600 BC
- Present location: British Museum, London
- Registration: GR 1772.3-14.70 (Jewellery 1574)

The Sant'Angelo Muxaro Patera is an ancient gold libation bowl that was discovered as part of a larger hoard in the seventeenth century near the hilltop town of Sant'Angelo Muxaro in Sicily, southern Italy. Since 1772, this rare and precious find has been part of the British Museum's Ancient Greek collection.

== Provenance and history ==
The patera was found in a tomb with three other bowls (two plain and another with bulls) which have since been lost. It later came into the possession of the famous diplomat and antiquary Sir William Hamilton, who sold it to the British Museum in 1772. Together the four bowls would have composed a prestigious treasure that probably belonged to a local monarch in Sicily. It may perhaps have been a gift to a Sicilian king from the western Greeks, as they migrated from the Greek mainland to the fringes of their new empire.

== Description ==
The Sant'Angelo Muxaro Patera is a shallow gold bowl decorated with six identical striding bulls in relief. The long-horned bulls have angular bodies with prominent ribs and large cloven hooves. The bowl would originally have had a precious stone inserted in the centre that has long since disappeared. To one side of the central medallion can be seen a dotted crescent moon. The decoration of the bowl mixes Ancient Greek and Phoenician characteristics.
