= Santa Elisabetta =

Town in Sicily, Italy

- Comune
- Comune di Santa Elisabetta
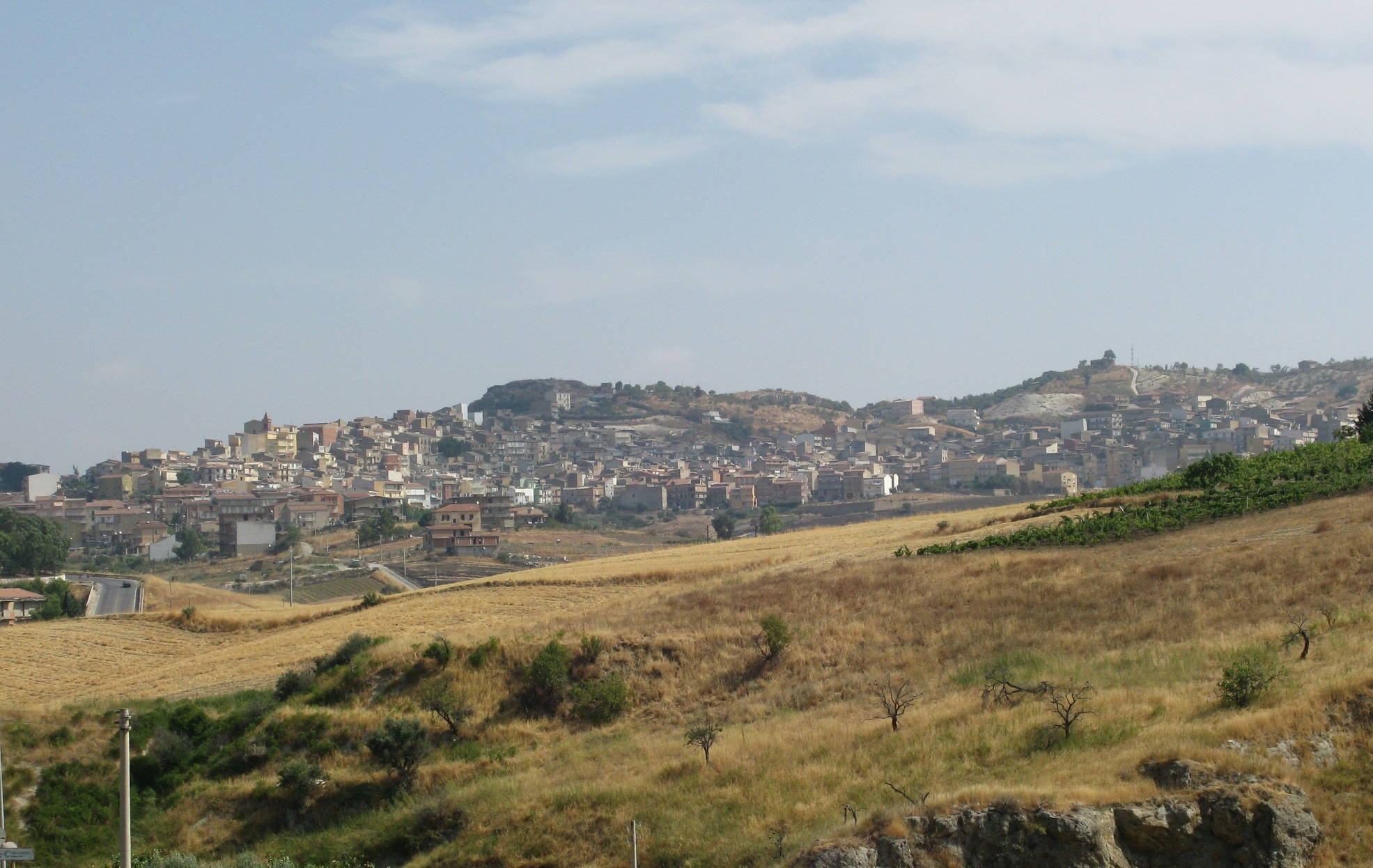
- View of Santa Elisabetta

- Location within Italy Location within Sicily
- Coordinates: 37°26′N 13°33′E
- Country: Italy
- Region: Sicily
- Province: Agrigento (AG)

Government
  - Mayor: Domenico Gueli

Area
  - Total: 16.17 km^{2} (6.24 sq mi)
- Elevation: 457 m (1,499 ft)

Population (30 November 2016)
  - Total: 2,241
  - Density: 138.6/km^{2} (358.9/sq mi)
- Demonym: Elisabettesi or Sabettesi
- Time zone: UTC+1 (CET)
  - Summer (DST): UTC+2 (CEST)
- Postal code: 92020
- Dialing code: 0922

Santa Elisabetta (Sicilian: Sabbetta) is a small town (municipality) in the Province of Agrigento in the Italian region Sicily, located about 80 kilometres (50 mi) south of Palermo and about 13 kilometres (8 mi) north of Agrigento.

Santa Elisabetta borders the following municipalities: Aragona, Joppolo Giancaxio, Raffadali, Sant'Angelo Muxaro.
