= Cianciana =

- Comune
- Comune di Cianciana
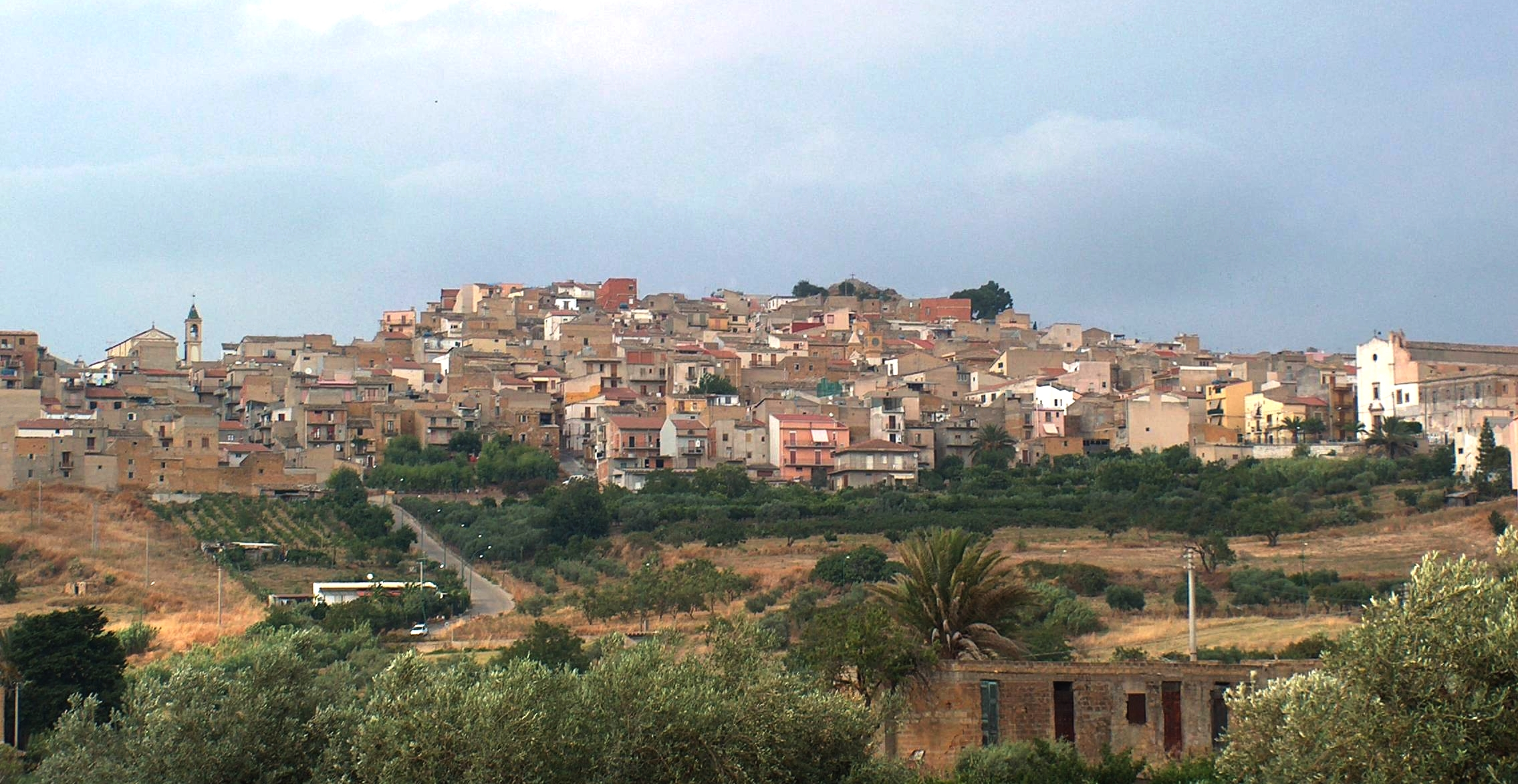
- View of Cianciana

- Coat of arms

- Location within Italy Location within Sicily
- Coordinates: 37°31′17″N 13°26′04″E
- Country: Italy
- Region: Sicily
- Province: Agrigento (AG)

Government
  - Mayor: Francesco Martorana

Area
  - Total: 37.7 km^{2} (14.6 sq mi)
- Elevation: 390 m (1,280 ft)

Population (1 January 2013)
  - Total: 3,515
  - Density: 93.2/km^{2} (241/sq mi)
- Demonym: Ciancianesi
- Time zone: UTC+1 (CET)
  - Summer (DST): UTC+2 (CEST)
- Postal code: 92012
- Dialing code: 0922
- Patron saint: Saint Anthony of Padua
- Saint day: June 13
- Website: Official website

Cianciana is a comune (municipality) in the Province of Agrigento in the Italian region Sicily, located in the middle valley of the Platani river, about 70 kilometres (43 mi) south of Palermo and about 25 kilometres (16 mi) northwest of Agrigento. The Monte Cammarata, elevation 1,579 metres (5,180 ft) above sea level, part of the Monti Sicani chain, is nearby.

Cianciana borders the following municipalities: Alessandria della Rocca, Bivona, Cattolica Eraclea, Ribera, Sant'Angelo Muxaro.

== History ==
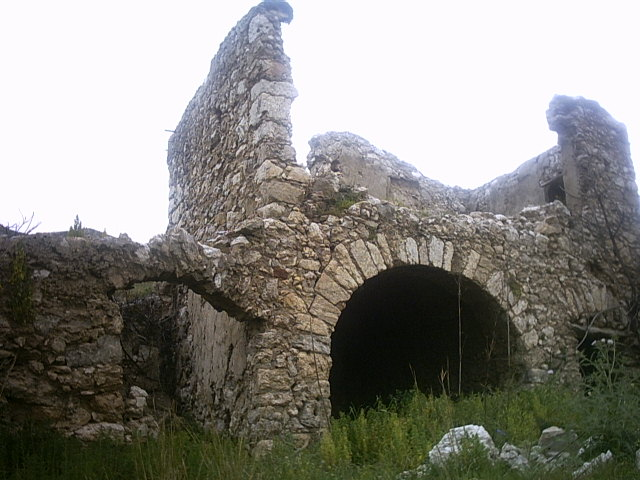
An abandoned zolfara (sulfur mine) near Cianciana.

The village is situated on the valley of the River Platani and is surrounded by the Sicani Mountains, and was originally inhabited the Cretans in the second millennium BC. Cianciana also was conquered by Greeks, Romans and Arabs.

According to local chronicles, a town known as La Ferla existed in the area in 1269. This was likely destroyed by an earthquake. Archaeological excavations have found traces of Roman temples and other constructions, including a "castle" called Casaletto di Chincana, whence the name given to the area in the feudal era of the Kingdom of Sicily.

Cianciana itself was founded on 4 October 1646 as Sant'Antonino di Cianciana, under the aegis of the Joppolo feudal family. In 1713 it had 2,303 inhabitants.

The center grew in importance after the discovery of the rich sulfur mines of the area, and the number of inhabitants reached 10,000. However, after the sulfur mine closed in the early 1960s, rapid emigration to England, France, Germany, the United States, Canada and other parts of the world reduced the population by more than half.

== Main sights ==
- Clock Tower
- Holy Trinity Mother Church (17th century). The church was built by Baron Jerome Ficarra in 1640 and completed by the Joppa family. Originally it had a nave, and in 1823 two aisles were added. The vault of the nave was frescoed by the painter Caramel De Simone in 1839. Inside there are, among others, two works of art: the statue of St. Anthony of Padua, the famous sculptor Jerome Bagnasco and the statue of marble of the Madonna. Attached to the church is the Chapel of the Blessed Lady of Sorrows and Holy Cross, built in 1741, which houses a large painting by Fedele Tirrito, The Deposition.
- Carmine Church (18th century). The church has a small nave, with a facade that features a triple lancet window placed above the portal. The apse is decorated with small floral stucco and frescoes.
- Purgatory Church (18th century). The church is dedicated to the Holy Souls in Purgatory and located in the town centre next to the Clock Tower. It was built in 171 . The building, in Neoclassical style, is characterised by a portal in the limestone above which contains a fake rose painting. It houses a valuable statue of the Risen Christ School of Bagnasco.
- St. Anthony Church (17th century). The church was built in Sicilian Baroque style by Prince Joppa was given to the Friars Minor, was opened for worship in 1866. The building is rectangular, has a single nave ending in an apse. The Church contains, in addition to several wooden statues, a painting of St. Anthony of Padua, painted on wood and a large painting representing the Madonna apparel painted by Accursio Torre.

== Notable residents ==
- Santo Trafficante Sr., boss of the Trafficante crime family in the United States.

== See also ==
- Sulfur mining in Sicily
