= Vincenzo Fontana (politician) =

Italian politician (born 1952)

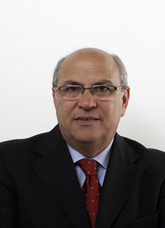

Member of the Sicilian Regional Assembly
- In office 11 December 2012 – 14 December 2017

Member of the Chamber of Deputies
- In office 29 April 2008 – 14 March 2013

President of the Province of Agrigento
- In office 25 May 1998 – 12 February 2008
- Preceded by: Stefano Vivacqua
- Succeeded by: Eugenio D'Orsi

Personal details
- Born: Vincenzo Antonio Fontana; 16 April 1952 (age 74) Agrigento, Italy
- Party: Lega (2021–present)
- Other political affiliations: FI (–2008); PdL (2008–2013); NCD (2013–2017)
- Education: University of Palermo
- Profession: Physician

Vincenzo Fontana (born 16 April 1952) is an Italian politician and deputy for Agrigento.
