= San Biagio Platani =

San Biagio Platani San Mrasi
- Comune
- Comune di San Biagio Platani
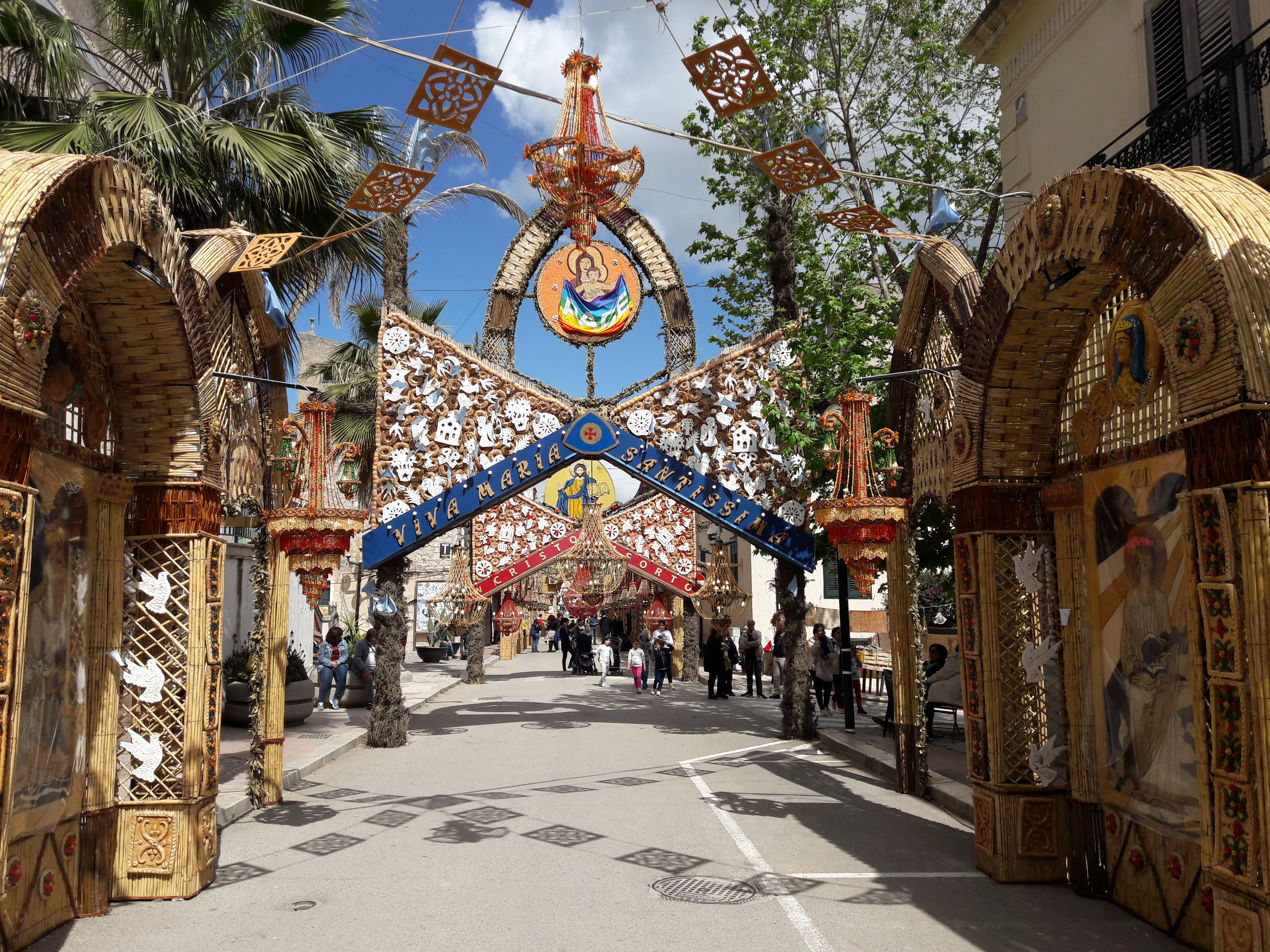
- View of San Biagio Platani

- Coat of arms

- Location within Italy Location within Sicily
- Coordinates: 37°30′N 13°32′E
- Country: Italy
- Region: Sicily
- Province: Province of Agrigento (AG)

Area
  - Total: 42.4 km^{2} (16.4 sq mi)
- Elevation: 416 m (1,365 ft)

Population (Dec. 2004)
  - Total: 3,689
  - Density: 87.0/km^{2} (225/sq mi)
- Demonym(s): Sambiagesi, Sanmrasisi
- Time zone: UTC+1 (CET)
  - Summer (DST): UTC+2 (CEST)
- Postal code: 92020
- Dialing code: 0922
- Website: Official website

San Biagio Platani (Sicilian: San Mrasi or San Brasi) is a comune (municipality) in the Province of Agrigento in the Italian region Sicily, located about 70 kilometres (43 mi) south of Palermo and about 20 kilometres (12 mi) north of Agrigento. As of 31 December 2004, it had a population of 3,689 and an area of 42.4 square kilometres (16.4 mi^{2}). San Biagio Platani is famous for its "Easter Arches" (Gli Archi di Pasqua.)

San Biagio Platani borders the following municipalities: Alessandria della Rocca, Casteltermini, Sant'Angelo Muxaro, Santo Stefano Quisquina.

The village has substantial diaspora populations in Chicago, Tampa, Quilmes, Berazategui, Remchigen, and Pforzheim.

== History ==
The origins date back to 1635, the year in which Giovanni Battista Gerardi obtained a licentia populandi for a settlement in the area. Gaetano Di Giovanni, in his work "Notizie storiche su Casteltermini e il suo territorio", attributes the foundation of the urban settlement to Mariano Gianguercio in 1648. Mentioning in his " Cedolario dei feudi della Val di Mazara", the "La terra di San Biagio". But the licentia instead suggests that the town began to develop a few years earlier, with a few houses around a small church. This settlement now consists of several key features of the main street of San Biagio Platani, still known by its prior official name " Via Piazza, or "La Chiazza" in Sicilian.

After the suppression of feudalism in Sicily, the village like most of the area began to be characterized by a huge shift towards the Americas and the general marginalization of the island. The settlement of San Biagio, along with much of the area continued its traditional economy. Meaning primarily, extensive agriculture through the settlement of fiefdoms. But the foundation of urban agglomerations also had other purposes linked to the prestige of the ruling Sicilian nobility. At the time, a village with more than 80 people gave the prince the right to a seat in parliament or to one more vote, in addition to power over his subjects through the faculty of administering justice within his own fiefdom. The fiefdom of San Biagio initially consisted of the lands of San Biagio, Gialdonieri and Mandralia. In 1660 the fiefdom of Ragattano was added, thanks to an exchange carried out by the feudal lords Ioppolo and Gianguercio. The fief thus came to a population of 1,830 individuals. The inhabited center's development began in the area around the Mother Church and the Ducal Palace. An orthogonal layout was established, the main axis of which is Corso Umberto I, which was then called Via Piazza (La Chiazza). For most of the nineteenth century the road was blocked by the small "Church of Purgatory", which was then demolished at the near the end of the 18th century. The central point of the street, located near the Mother Church, represents the center of gravity of the town, from which the other main axis starts, which is today's Viale della Vittoria, formerly Strada Chiarenza. Via Veneziano starts in parallel in front of the Doge's Palace.

For most of its history San Biagio's population grew at a steady pace and by 1653 the town had about 300 inhabitants. But in the eighteenth century, the productivity crisis and the old institutional political system led to a decline in demographic trends. A serious problem was presented by monoculture, which created occasional famine. In the eighteenth century there were three famines. To deal with the problem Agesilao Bonanno, who would later become lord of the land of San Biagio, was appointed vicar for the storage of grain. The decline of the Sicilian noble families did not spare even the lord of San Biagio, who moved to the Villa della Noce in Palermo, with a series of contracts drawn up at the end of the eighteenth century and handed over all possessions to the gabelle. 1812 marks the end of feudalism.

In 1864 the name Platani was added to distinguish this town from other Italian centers with the same toponym.

=== List of Feudal Rulers ===
1635 Licentia Populandi

- 1635 Giovanbattista Gerardo
- 1640 Pietro Gianguercio
- 1648 Antonina Gianguercio
- 1649 Cesare Gianguercio
- 1655 Carlo Setaiolo
- 1665 Antonina Gianguercio
- 1666 Diego Ioppolo

1687 Imposition of the Duchy of San Biagio

- 1687 Antonino Giuseppe Ioppolo
- 1690 Pietro Ioppolo Gianguercio
- 1716 Ludovico Ioppolo Spatafora
- 1733 Ludovico Ioppolo Pescatore
- 1769 Agesilao Bonanno Ioppolo
- 1810 Agesilao Gioeni Bonanno

1812 End of feudalism

Like many other villages in rural Sicily the village has experienced large amounts of emigration. Creating both a global community as well creating the problem of depopulation.

== The Bread Arches of Easter ==
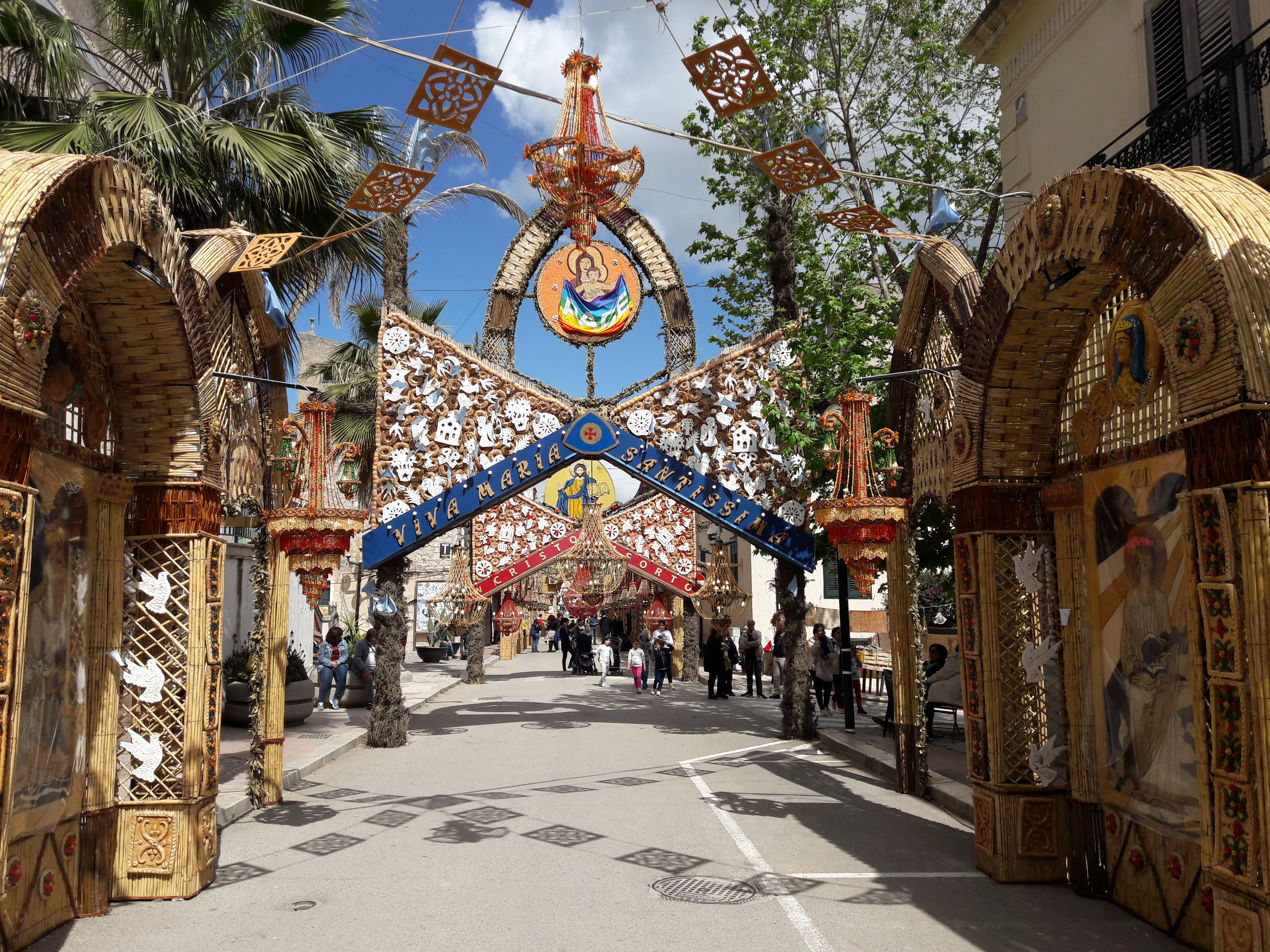
The Bread Arches of Easter

Beginning as a devotional of the two largest catholic confraternities of San Biagio, the festival of the "Archi di Pasqua" has become an international event welcoming thousands of visitors every year. The village has a museum dedicated share the history and process of the Archi di Pasqua.

== Twin Cities ==
The town of San Biagio Platani is twinned with Remchingen, Germany.

It was announced in 2022 that San Biagio Platani will twin with Tampa, Florida.

== Demographic evolution ==
Historical population

Year	Pop.	±%
1861	2,294	—
1871	2,410	+5.1%
1881	2,795	+16.0%
1901	3,303	+18.2%
1911	4,060	+22.9%

Year	Pop.	±%
1921	4,193	+3.3%
1931	4,652	+10.9%
1936	4,836	+4.0%
1951	5,036	+4.1%
1961	5,072	+0.7%

Year	Pop.	±%
1971	5,266	+3.8%
1981	5,513	+4.7%
1991	4,128	−25.1%
2001	3,785	−8.3%

Source: Data from ISTAT
