= Giuseppe Pendolino =

Italian politician (born 1964)

President of the Free Municipal Consortium of Agrigento
- Incumbent
- Assumed office 28 April 2025
- Preceded by: Office established

Mayor of Aragona
- Incumbent
- Assumed office 14 June 2017
- Preceded by: Salvatore Parello

Personal details
- Born: 23 June 1964 (age 62) Aragona, Province of Agrigento, Italy
- Party: Italia Viva
- Occupation: Agricultural entrepreneur

Giuseppe Pendolino (born 23 June 1964) is an Italian politician who has served as president of the Free Municipal Consortium of Agrigento since 2025 and as mayor of Aragona since 2017.

== Career ==
Pendolino has worked as an agricultural entrepreneur since 1985. He was first elected to the municipal council of Aragona in 1993. He served as municipal assessor for productive activities from 1997 to 2002.

Pendolino was elected mayor of Aragona in the 2017 municipal elections, receiving 36.42% of the vote. He was re-elected in 2022. In the same year, he joined the Italia Viva (IV) party.

In April 2025, Pendolino became president of the Free Municipal Consortium of Agrigento in the first election for the body's political leadership after more than a decade of commissarial administration. Supported by Forza Italia, the Movement for Autonomy, the Democratic Party and the Five Star Movement, he defeated Stefano Castellino, mayor of Palma di Montechiaro, with 50,699 weighted votes (53.27%). In the same year, it was reported that Pendolino had not renewed his membership of IV, despite having been presented as a supporter of the party during his 2025 presidential campaign.
