= Castello di Barrugeri =

Former castle in Aragona, Italy

- Aragona, Sicily, Italy

Site information
- Type: Castle

Location
- Coordinates: 37°23′25″N 13°35′25″E

Site history
- Built: c. 1295

The Castello di Barrugeri, also known as Birigirum, was a castle in Aragona, Sicily. It was built in around 1295.

No remains of the castle have survived, and its site is now flat agricultural land.
