= Sant'Angelo Muxaro =

Sant'Angelo Muxaro Sant'Àncilu Muxaru (Sicilian)
- Comune
- Comune di Sant'Angelo Muxaro
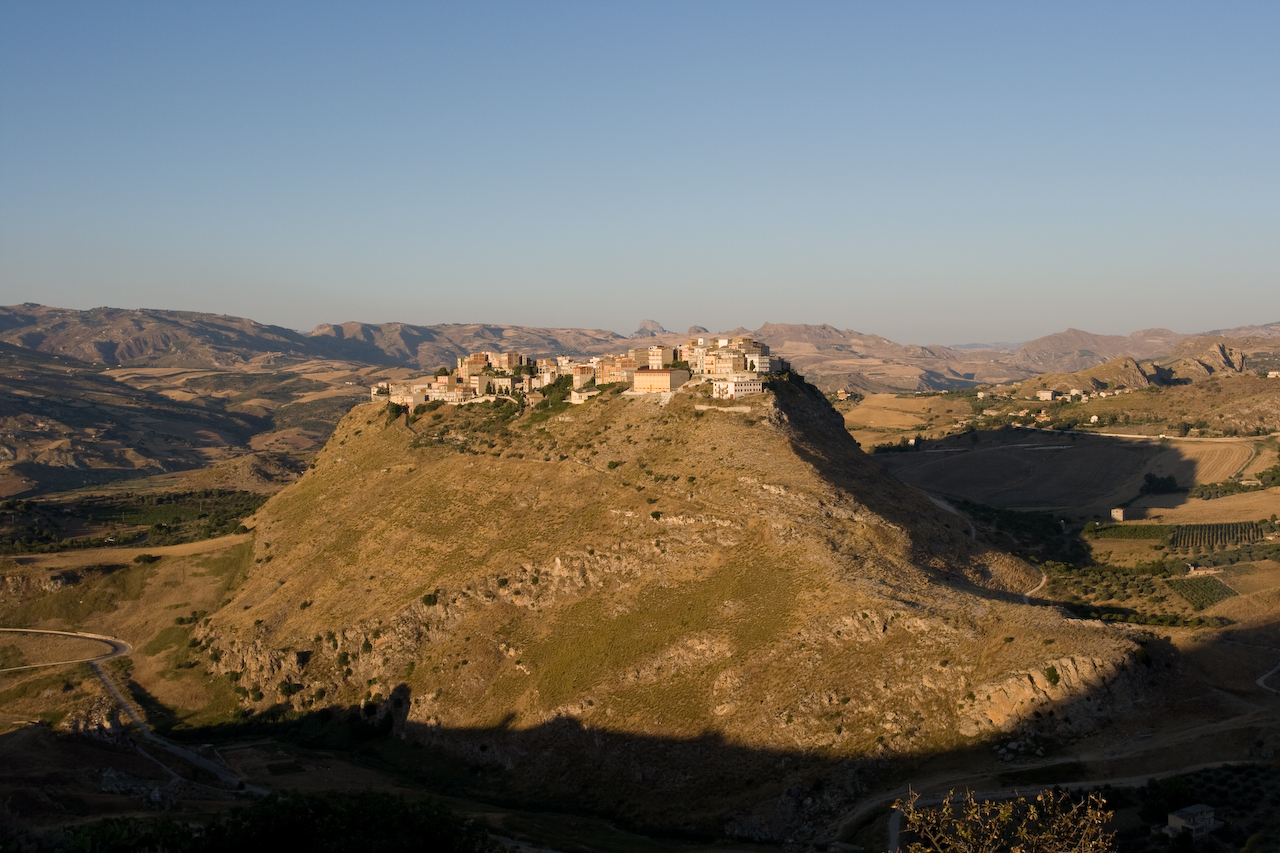
- Overview of Sant'Angelo

- Coat of arms

- Position of the municipality of Sant'Angelo Muxaro in the free municipal consortium of Agrigento

- Location within Italy Location within Sicily
- Coordinates: 37°28′15″N 13°32′47″E
- Country: Italy
- Region: Sicily
- Province: Agrigento (AG)

Government
  - Mayor: Angelo Tirrito (civic list - Svoltiamo insieme)

Area
  - Total: 64.55 km^{2} (24.92 sq mi)
- Elevation: 335 m (1,099 ft)

Population (31 December 2023)
  - Total: 1,170
  - Density: 18.1/km^{2} (46.9/sq mi)
- Demonym: Santangelesi
- Time zone: UTC+1 (CET)
  - Summer (DST): UTC+2 (CEST)
- Postal code: 92020
- Dialing code: 0922
- Patron saint: St. Angelus of Jerusalem
- Saint day: August 16
- Website: Official website

Sant'Angelo Muxaro (Italian: [sanˈtandʒelo muʃˈʃaːro]; Sicilian: Sant'Àncilu Muxaru or Musciaru; Arbëreshë Albanian: Shënt'Ëngjëlli) is a comune (municipality) in the Province of Agrigento in the Italian region of Sicily, located about 70 kilometres (43 mi) south of Palermo and about 20 kilometres (12 mi) north of Agrigento. The town was founded and historically inhabited by the Arbëreshë community.

Sant'Angelo Muxaro borders the following municipalities: Agrigento, Alessandria della Rocca, Aragona, Casteltermini, Cattolica Eraclea, Cianciana, Raffadali, San Biagio Platani, Santa Elisabetta.

== Geography ==
It is a small town in the Agrigento province, located on a hill 335 meters above sea level, along the left bank of the Platani River.

== History ==
The early urban origins of this territory remain undefined. An important Iron Age village arose around the 13th century BC by indigenous people, identified with the Sicani . Archaeologically the village constitutes a valid chronological guide for local production of objects from the first native societies to the relationship with the first Greek settlers during the great season of the apoikiai during the 8th - 7th century BC.

The town is sitting atop of a hill, partially excavated. To this day a small part has revealed a collection of small and big tombs, varying in size, carved in soft stone. In it proximity many small necropolises can be found.

Four gold and silver bowls dating from 650 to 600 BC were found in a tomb in the vicinity of the village in the 18th century, by Paolo Orsi. Only one gold bowl remains, now in the British Museum's collection. The BM's phiale is decorated with 6 striding bulls and has become a symbol of Sant'Angelo Muxaro. The Archeological Museum of Agrigento, adjacent to the Valley of the Temples, holds a selection of vases found in the vicinity of the village, mainly inside tombs.

Following the Ottoman invasion of Albania in the late fifteenth century, the present town was colonized by Albanian refugees. The centre of the town was founded in 1506 with further building in 1511. The town retained a distinct Italo-Albanian or Arbëreshë culture for many years. In the early 17th century the town was still an Arbëreshë settlement but now the Arbëresh language has disappeared from usage.

In 1600, the barony was acquired by the Princes of Castelvetrano, D'Aragona and Tagliavia and finally came under the jurisdiction of Pignatelli, Dukes of Monteleone, who kept it until 1812, when feudalism was suppressed in Sicily.

== Monuments and places of interest ==
- Mother Church of Sant'Angelo Martire
- Church of the Blessed Virgin Mary of Mount Carmel
- Tomb of the Prince - prehistoric tomb The archaeological area is linked to the myth of the tomb of Minos near the Sicanian city of Camico, ruled by the mythical king Cocalus, who hosted Daedalus fleeing from Crete. This hypothesis is controversial, and other studies identify the Tomb of Minos with Colle Madore near Lercara Friddi, or with the Gurfa Caves near Alia.
- Protohistoric necropolis on Colle Sant'Angelo
- Grotticelle Necropolis
- Ruins of the medieval castle of Qal'at al Mushari'a

== Demographic evolution ==
Historical population

| Year | Pop. | ±% |
|---|---|---|
| 1861 | 1,006 | — |
| 1871 | 1,171 | +16.4% |
| 1881 | 1,390 | +18.7% |
| 1901 | 1,951 | +40.4% |
| 1911 | 2,165 | +11.0% |
| 1921 | 2,184 | +0.9% |

| Year | Pop. | ±% |
|---|---|---|
| 1931 | 2,297 | +5.2% |
| 1936 | 2,373 | +3.3% |
| 1951 | 2,652 | +11.8% |
| 1961 | 2,575 | −2.9% |
| 1971 | 1,975 | −23.3% |
| 1981 | 2,150 | +8.9% |

| Year | Pop. | ±% |
|---|---|---|
| 1991 | 2,007 | −6.7% |
| 2001 | 1,730 | −13.8% |
| 2011 | 1,471 | −15.0% |
| 2021 | 1,182 | −19.6% |

Source: Data from ISTAT

=== Ethnic groups and foreign minorities ===
As of December 31, 2024, there were 43 foreigners residing in Sant'Angelo Muxaro, representing 4.0% of the resident population. The largest foreign community is that from Argentina with 31.9% of all foreigners present in the country, followed by Romania.

== Culture ==
=== Museums ===
In December 2015, the archaeological museum "MuSAM" was inaugurated. For the occasion, the British Museum temporarily made available a unique piece from almost three thousand years ago: a gold bowl found in one of the tombs of the ancient city and donated to the British Museum in 1772.

== Economy ==
The municipality's territory is included in the production area of the Raffadali Pistachio D.O.P.

== Administration ==
| Period | | Office holder | Party | Title | Notes |
|---|---|---|---|---|---|
| 30 May 2023 | in office | Angelo Tirrito | Lista civica - Svoltiamo insieme | Mayor | |

== Sister cities ==
- Quilmes, Argentina

== Gallery ==
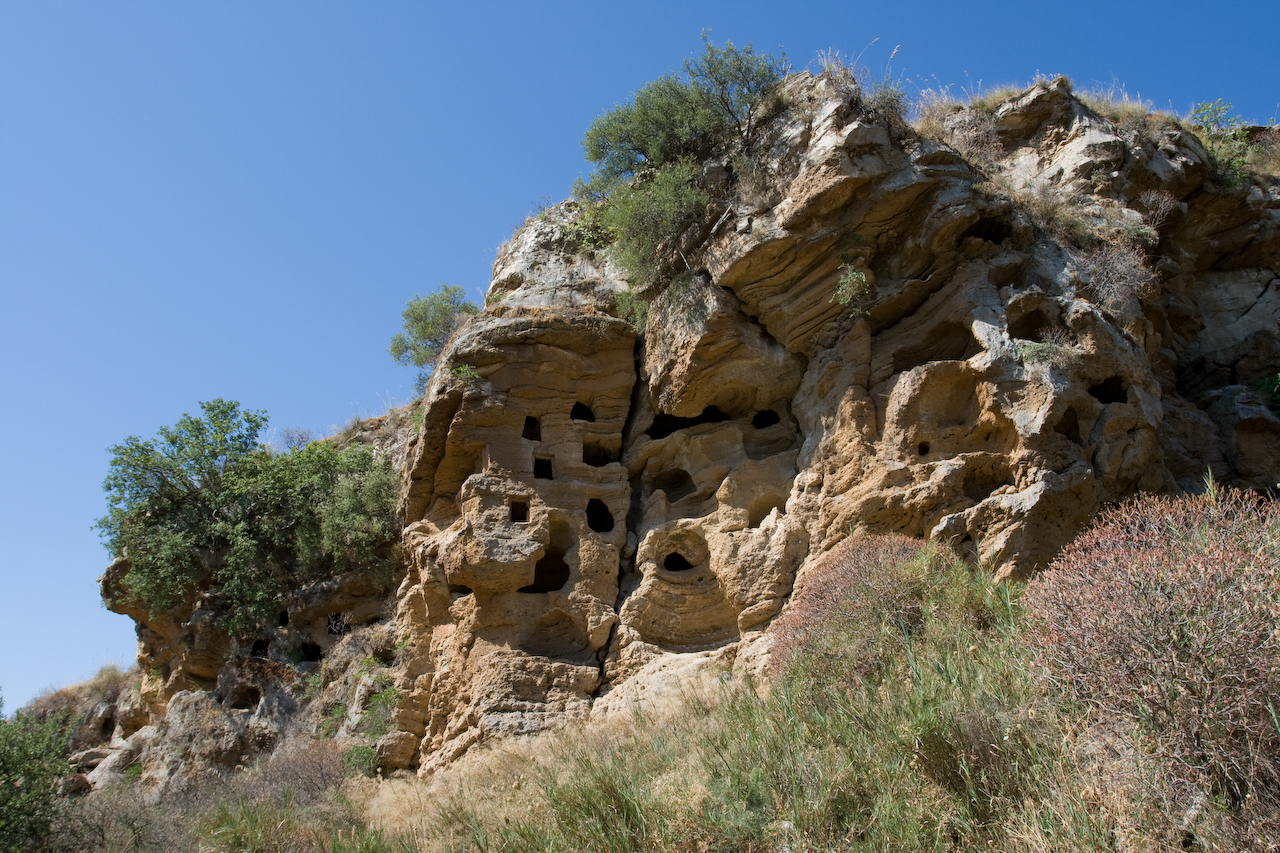
Prehistoric necropolis

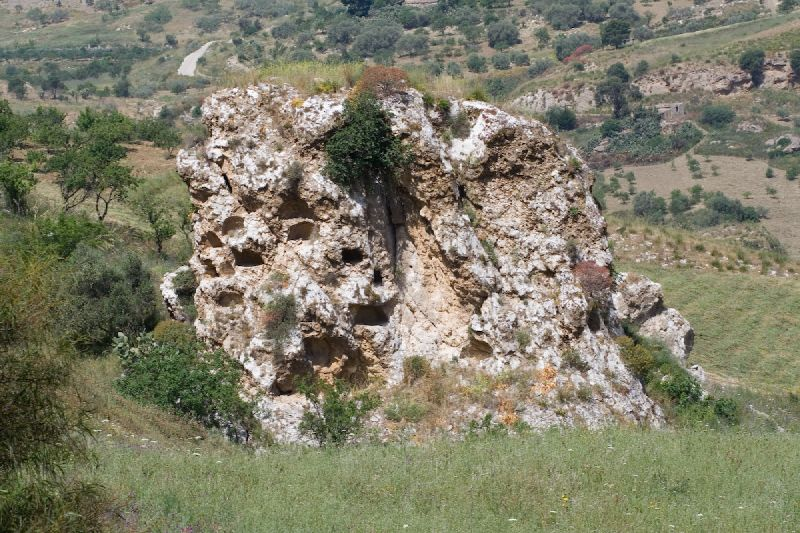
Prehistoric necropolis

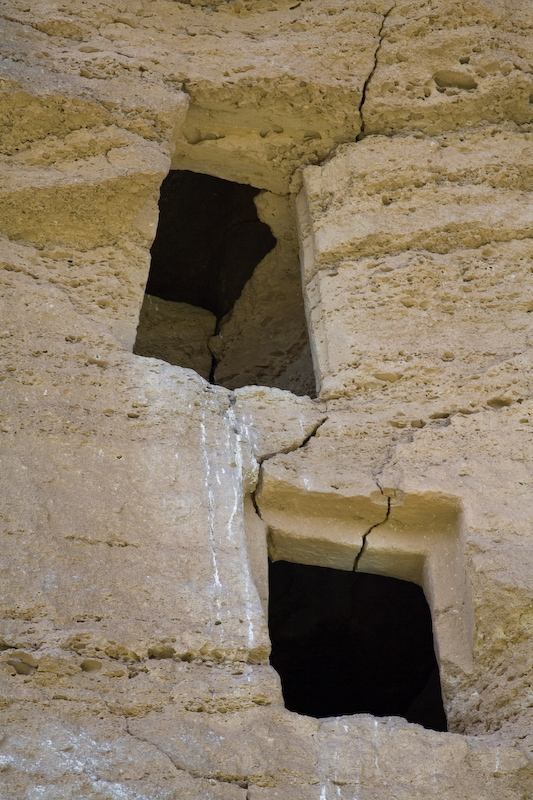
SantAngelo Muxaro

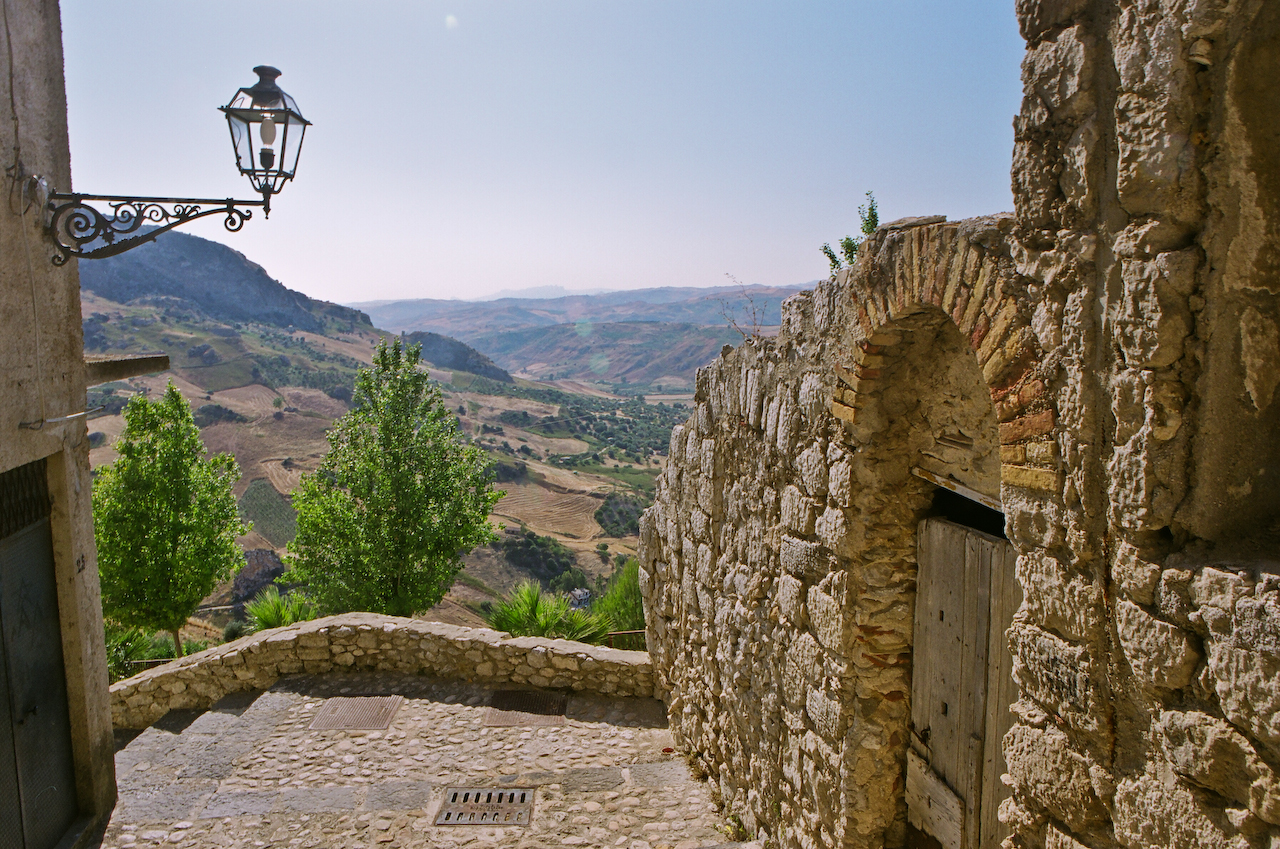
The town overlooks the valley

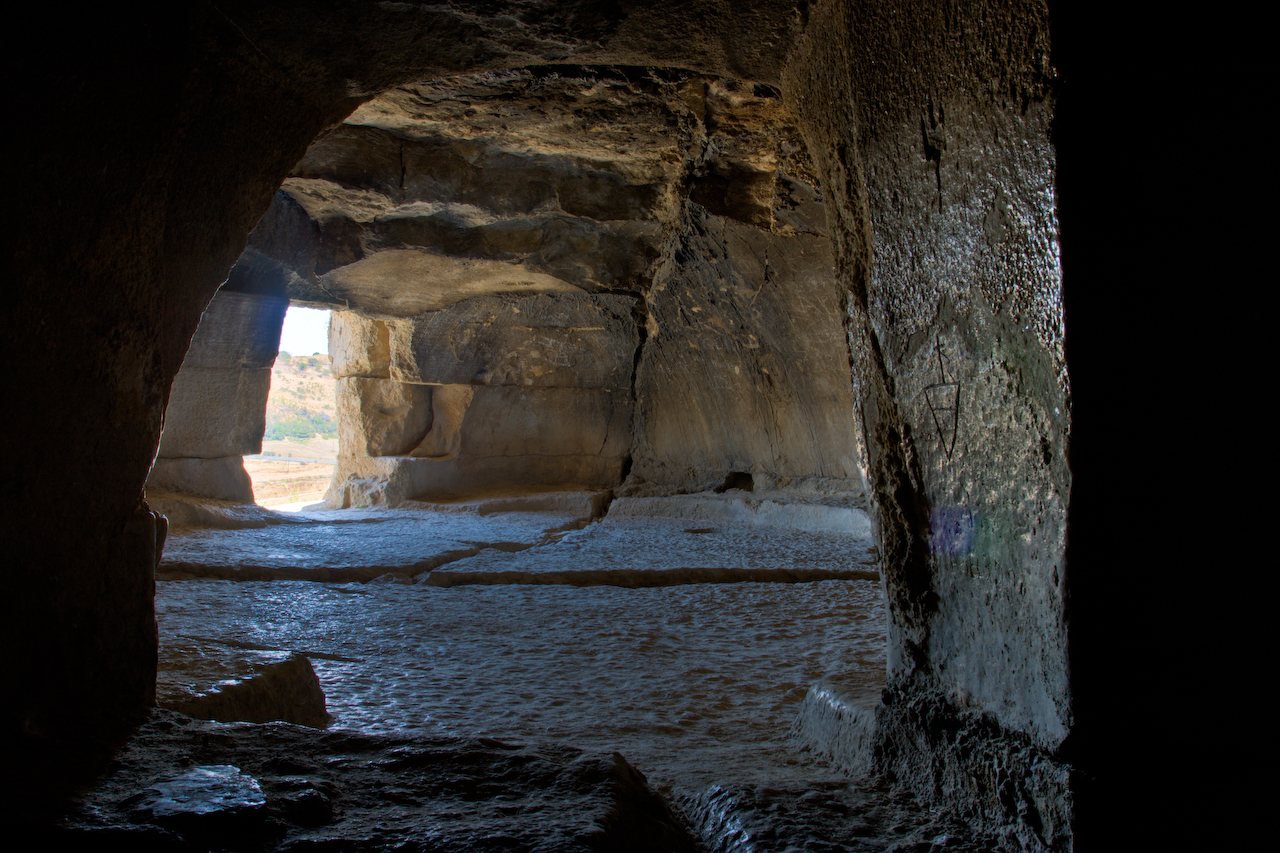
Tomb of the Prince

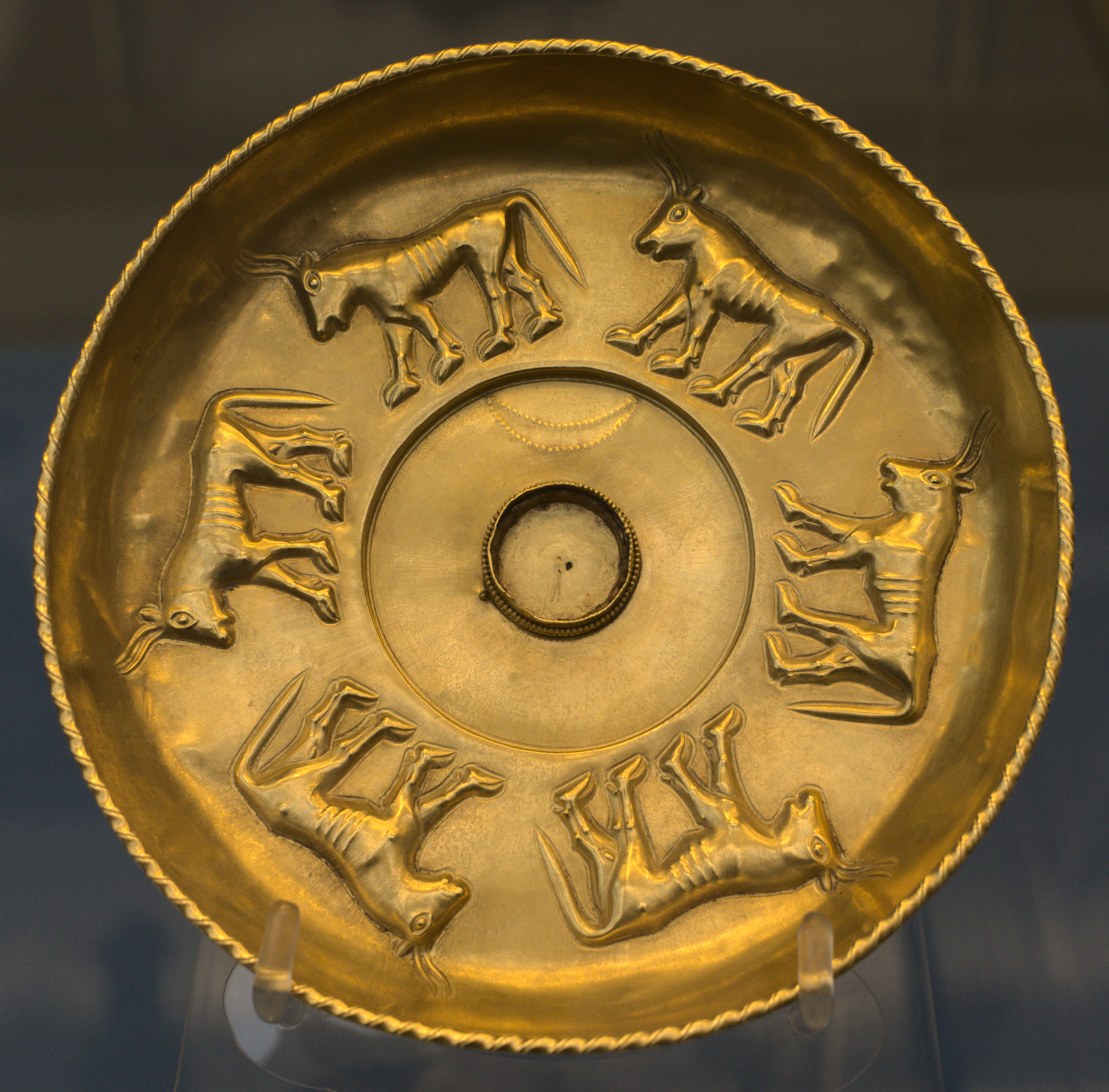
Sant'Angelo Muxaro Patera on display in the British Museum

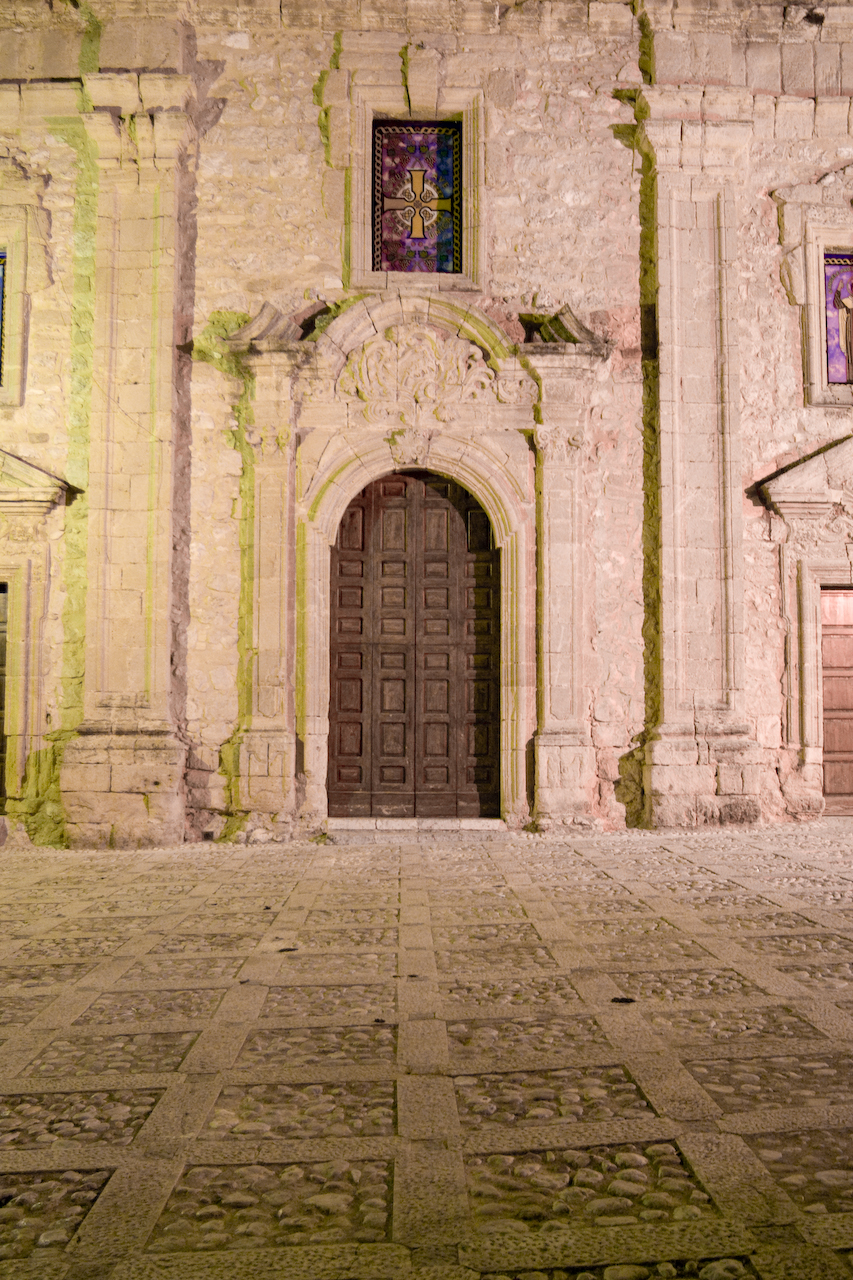
Mother Church

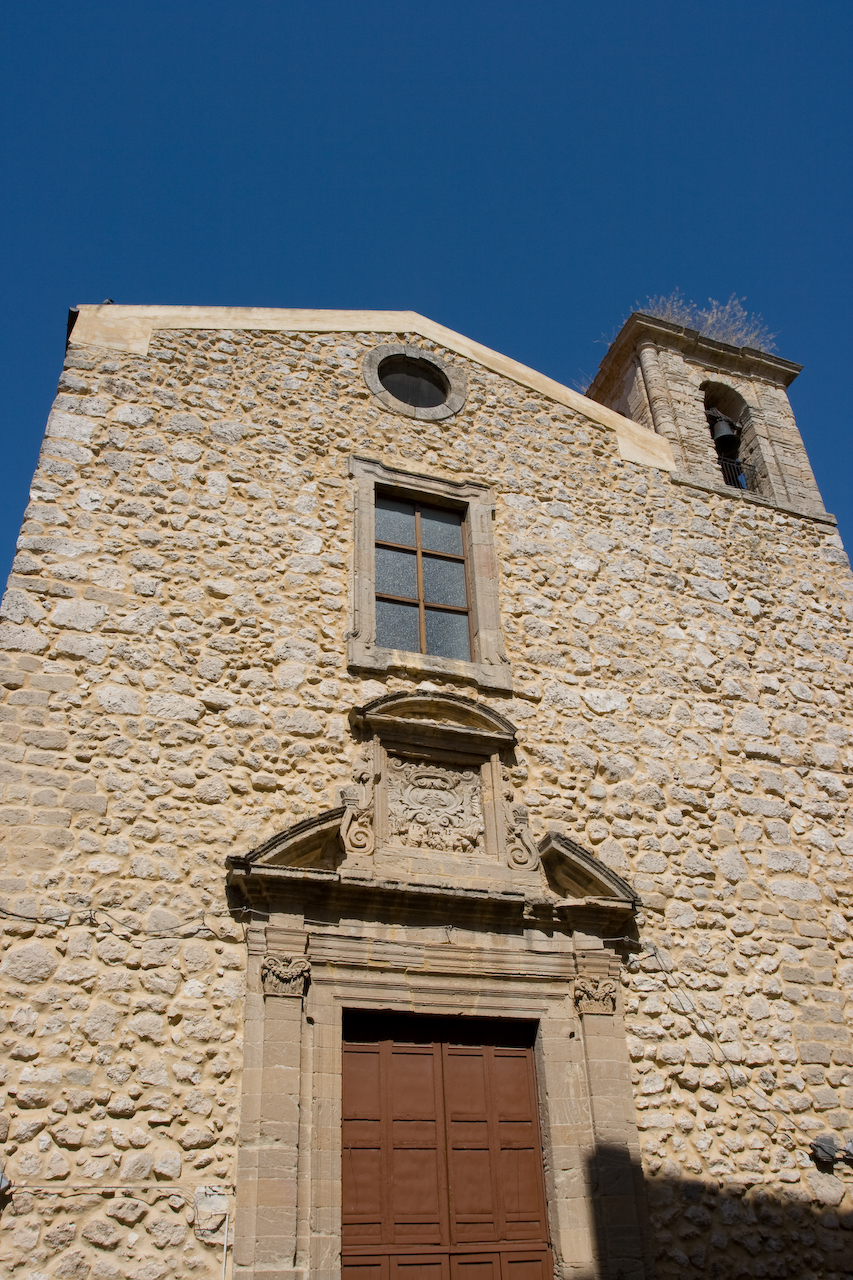
Carmel Church

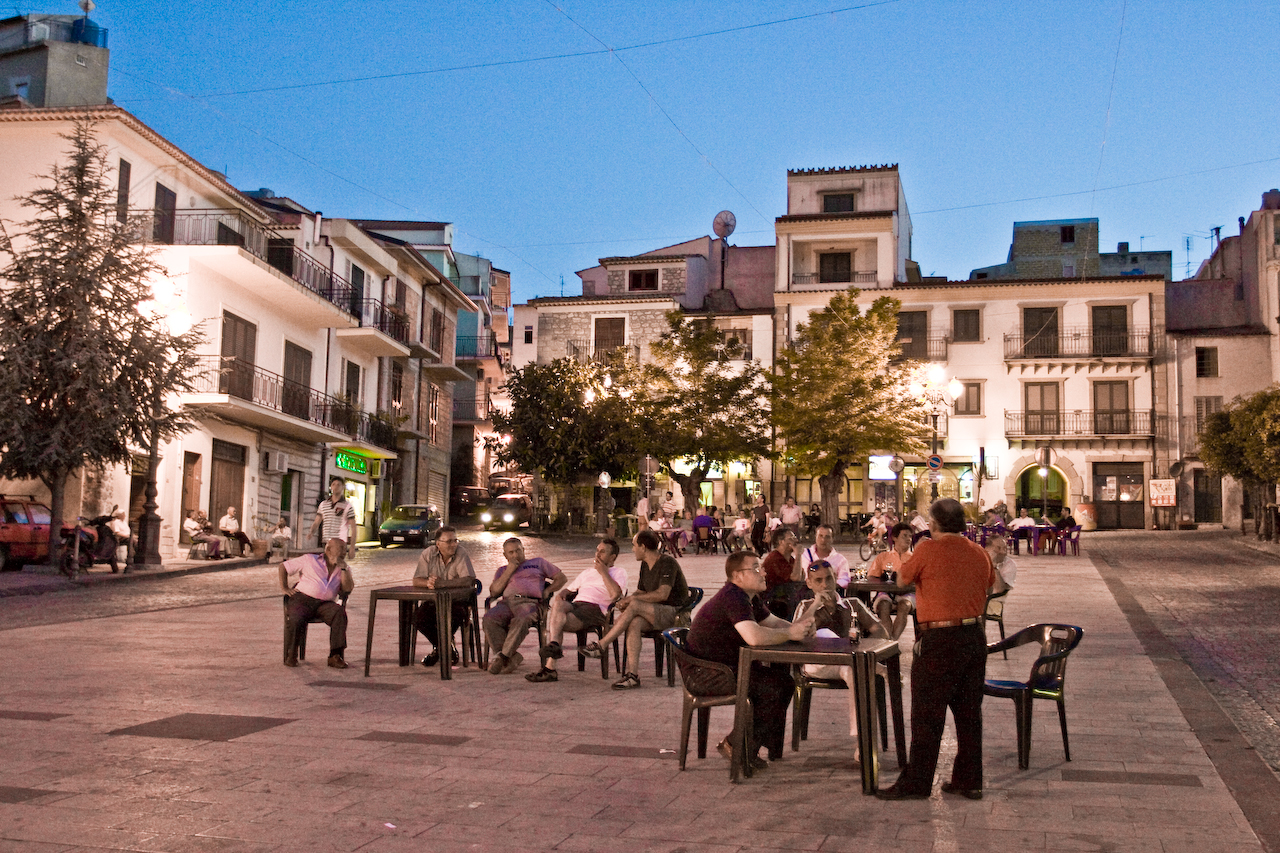
The main square
