= San Leone, Agrigento =

San Leone (Santulì, Sandulì or Salleò in Agrigento dialect) is a seaside town and port South of Agrigento. It rises on the Akragas point, near the mouth of the Akragas river.

== History ==
Known for being the seaside resort of the City of Temples, it takes its name from Pope Leo II (682 - 683). Originally the area was occupied by the emporium (port) of the Greek city which was continuously frequented until the Arab period. The emporium had already been occupied by Mycenaean navigators around the middle of the second millennium BC from which they supplied themselves with sulfur and rock salt. The fortified village discovered by Mosso at the beginning of the twentieth century dates back to this period. In the seventh century BC the Greeks of Gela established a commercial port, documented by the nearby necropolis of Montelusa (a hill west of the current settlement).

In the Middle Ages monks settled in San Leone, but as it was unsuitable for landing Medieval ships, it was abandoned in favor of Porto Empedocle. Not much remains of the Greek period, also because the district has been heavily urbanized in the past century. In the sixteenth century, Italian historian Tommaso Fazello noticed in the area of the mouth of the saxa quadrata the remains of the docks of the classic port that stretched along the banks of the river. Certainly, as was the custom among the ancients, there were large 'hangars' where military ships were pulled ashore and docks for commercial activities.

The port's activity and scale had to be intense considering the importance of the city, as evidenced by the significant number of coins found in the area ranging from the classical to the Byzantine and finally Arab period, confirming that the emporium was in use until about the 10th-11th century. Mysterious ritual sacrifices of oriental (Egyptian) origin perhaps identify small foreign commercial colonies or influences on local cults. In the 19th century a hand mill was founded in the vicinity of the Caruso house, which was used until the 1920s. Until about 1900 an ancient building with a semicircular vault of clear Roman origins existed near the church of San Leone, where a large family of fishermen lived. It was demolished by Commendatore Alfonso Caratozzolo to build a house near the old parish church of San Leone.

Among the other artifacts discovered in San Leone in the late 19th and early 20th century were buildings of Roman origin, and Arab warehouses. A huge Greek sarcophagus was also discovered near the church of San Leone, formed by a single block of sandstone, but was unfortunately cut into four parts and transformed into seats on the beach. The church of San Leone was built around the 13th century, but was exposed to the attacks of the Barbary corsairs. A watchtower was built in the sixteenth century by Tiburzio Spannocchi (1578). The tower, which still exists, stands on the heights of the Forgia district and is used, together with the farm that has developed around it, for tourist accommodation activities. In the eighteenth century the enlightened bishop Lorenzo Gioeni (1730 - 1754) built a summer holiday home for young people that still today dominates the woods and the beach of Maddalusa from the top of the Montelusa hill. The bishop himself had considered the site of San Leone as an area to build the port of Girgenti.

The project was rejected for several reasons and in 1749 the works for the construction of the port were carried out in the beach of the Porto Empedocle, which had been fortified in 1544 during the reign of Charles V. In the 19th century, San Leone was once again populated as a holiday area by the people of Agrigento. The Caruso houses were built in the current Trinacria square. The oldest of these is the Caratozzolo house ( Ex Caruso House till 1897)) on the seafront close to the Arena Estiva, the so-called 'Cevuzu' (mulberry) in Sicilian language and several villas in Liberty style. A wooden chalet was built in the first half of the last century, while the bathing establishment was built in the 1950s. During the Second World War the Italian army fortified San Leone by closing the roads that lead to the waterfront and repulsed an attempted landing by US troops.

From the 1960s, San Leone witnessed uncontrolled development that has transformed it from a small fishing village to a chaotic seaside resort crowded during the summer by about 30,000 vacationers, while the stable population is about 4,000 people. Today San Leone is welded to the neighboring agglomerations of Villaggio Peruzzo, Villaggio Mosè, Cannatello and Fiume Naro with which is included in the constituency of San Leone Mosè's total of 13,012 inhabitants. In the 1970s, the waterfront was enlarged in its present form and the port was built, and in the 1990s, a helipad was built which is no longer used.

== Archaeology ==
There are few traces of the Greek port, limited to the presence of the oldest Greek necropolis of Agrigento, on the hill of Montelusa, which has returned important artifacts of archaic Greek art. Little is left in the inhabited area as most of the finds have been either adapted for other uses or, as regards the port infrastructures still visible a century ago, buried by the gravel brought by the sea and by the floods of the river. In the vicinity of San Leone, and precisely in Cannatello, there are the remains of a settlement-emporium, discovered in the early twentieth century by Angelo Mosso dating back to the 14th-12th century BC. It is considered the most representative site, together with Thapsos, of the Bronze Age culture in Sicily. The excavation delimited the emerging part of the village chief, which is the fortified part where the ruling family resided and where the inhabitants of the surroundings took refuge during enemy raids. The Sican village appears delimited by a mighty double circle of curved walls with a thickness of about 8 meters. The inner circle of walls is the oldest and suffered a violent fire, the second took the place of the first.

Inside there are the remains of circular and rectilinear huts. Three successive phases of settlement were recognized. In the area, Aegean-Cypriot pottery and an urn containing four spearheads, two swords and a bronze hatchet were found. With this discovery, the hypothesis of an Aegean-Cypriot contribution in the 13th century BC in the area of the Agrigento marina took hold. This area was already frequented from the early Bronze Age by the Aegean-Cypriots who obtained sulfur from the mines of Monte Grande, perhaps the oldest sulfur mine in the Western world. Sulfur was a very precious mineral in ancient times, a real catalyst of human progress as it was useful for reaching the melting temperature of metals.

Sulphur was also used to purify and disinfect. The Cannatello emporium functioned, as Monte Grande did in the 18th century BC, as a port of call for sulfur, rock salt and probably also bitumen for the Aegean-Cypriot navigators, who used this beach as intermediate base for the routes that connected Cyprus and the Aegean with North Africa and the Sardinian and Iberian West.

== Places of interest ==
- Villa Pertini, with a fountain and some contemporary art sculptures;
- Torre di Santo Lio, (16th century) on the hill of Montelusa in the Forgia district, now incorporated into an agricultural masseria.
- Villa Gioenina, (18th century) in the Maddalusa or Montelusa district, dominates the mouth of the river. It was commissioned in the first half of the eighteenth century by Bishop Lorenzo Gioeni.

== Economy and politics ==
San Leone is a popular seaside resort thanks to the long beaches that surround it, the dunes and the Maddalusa, and for the proximity of the Valley of the Temples. The mayor of the Comune of Agrigento is Lillo Firetto, who was elected in 2015.

== Bibliography ==
- Agrigento, 1994; Antonino Marrone & Daniela Maria Ragusa; ed. Fenice 2000.
- Akragas-Agrigento La Storia, La topografia, I monumenti, gli scavi, 1995; Pietro Griffo; ed. Legambiente.
- La Sicilia nel II millennio a.C., 2002; Giuseppe Castellana; ed. S. Sciascia.
- Osservazioni e note sulla topografia agrigentina, 1930; Michele Caruso Lanza.
- Vescovi e società girgentina del Settecento, 2004; Francesco Pillitteri; ed. S. Sciascia.
