= Province of Agrigento =

Province of Agrigento Provincia di Agrigento (Italian) Pruvincia di Girgenti (Sicilian)
- Province
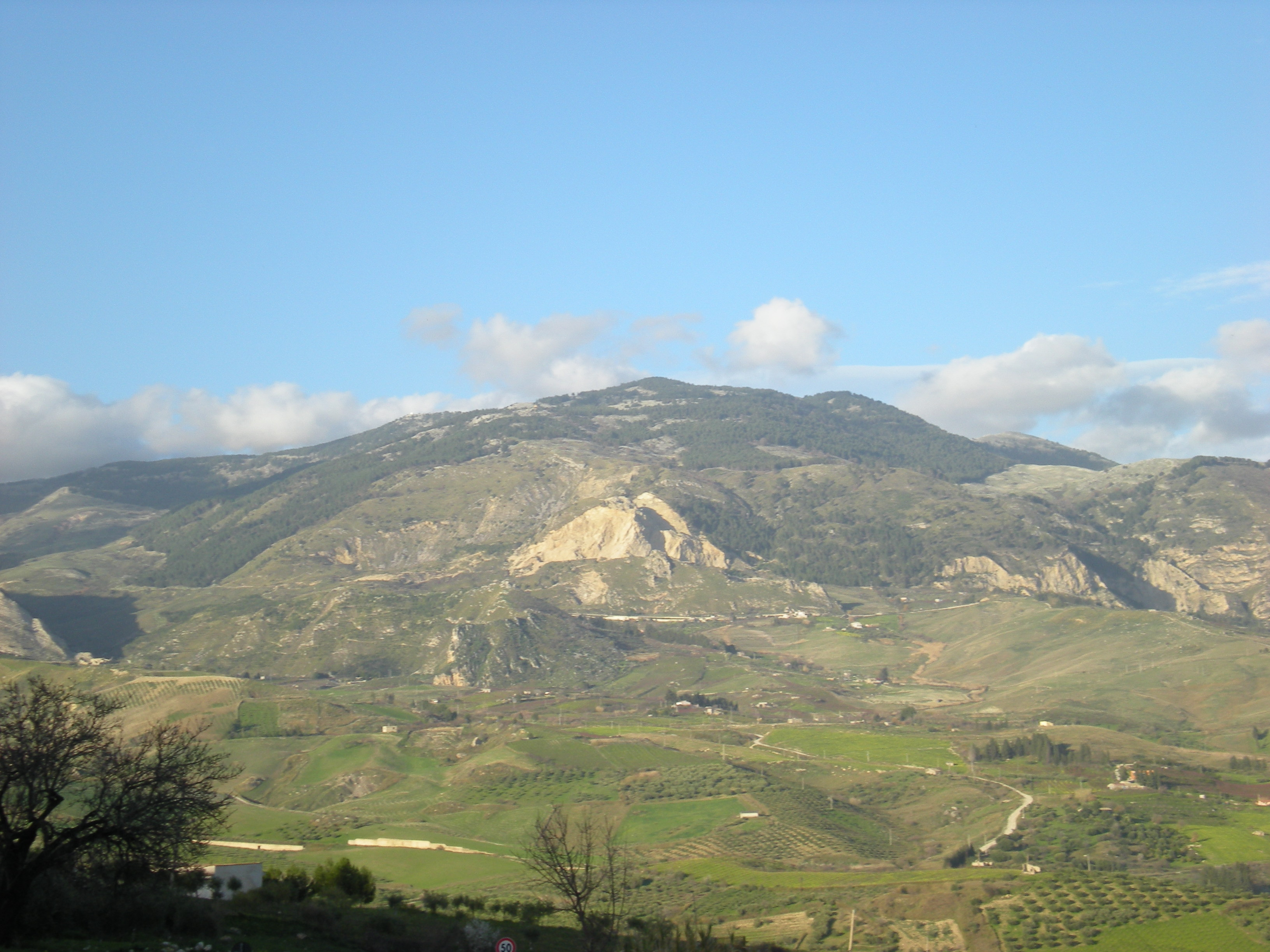
- Monte delle Rose (IT), Mountain of Roses (EN), Muntagna de Rosi (Sicilian), Mali i Trëndafilët (Arbëreshe)

- Coat of arms

- Location of the province of Agrigento in Italy
- Coordinates: 37°19′N 13°35′E
- Country: Italy
- Region: Sicily
- Capital(s): Agrigento
- Municipalities: 43

Government
  - President: Giuseppe Pendolino (IV)

Area
  - Total: 3,052.59 km^{2} (1,178.61 sq mi)

Population (2026)
  - Total: 407,041
  - Density: 133.343/km^{2} (345.356/sq mi)

GDP
  - Total: €6.558 billion (2015)
  - Per capita: €14,690 (2015)
- Time zone: UTC+1 (CET)
  - Summer (DST): UTC+2 (CEST)
- Postal code: 92100, 92010-92029
- Telephone prefix: 0922, 0925
- Vehicle registration: AG
- ISTAT code: 084
- Website: www.provincia.agrigento.it

The province of Agrigento (Italian: provincia di Agrigento; Sicilian: pruvincia di Girgenti) was a province in the autonomous island region of Sicily in Italy, situated on its south-western coast. Following the suppression of the Sicilian provinces, it was replaced in 2015 by the Free Municipal Consortium of Agrigento (Italian: libero consorzio comunale di Agrigento).

It has a population of 407,041 in an area of 3,052.59 square kilometres (1,178.61 mi^{2}) across its 43 municipalities.

== History ==
Greek colonists from Gela founded the province in the 6th century BC as Akragas. Carthage destroyed the province in 406 BC, but it was later ruled by the Romans, Goths, Byzantines, and Arabs. The Arabs rebuilt several parts of the province. Several ancient Doric temples were constructed during the 6th and 5th century BC to worship Hercules, Jupiter, Juno, Castor, Pollux, and Demeter. They are located in the Valley of Temples (Italian: Valle dei Templi). The ancient temples and other architectural structures were built using the stones of the hills near Capo San Marco.

== Geography ==
It is surrounded by province of Palermo in the north, Trapani in the west, Mediterranean Sea in the south, and Caltanissetta in the east.

The province faces the Channel of Sicily in the south and is known for its beaches. Torre Salsa's beaches have been designated natural reserves and are protected due to their environmental importance.

== Government ==
=== Municipalities ===
The province has 43 municipalities:

- Agrigento
- Alessandria della Rocca
- Aragona
- Bivona
- Burgio
- Calamonaci
- Caltabellotta
- Camastra
- Cammarata
- Campobello di Licata
- Canicattì
- Casteltermini
- Castrofilippo
- Cattolica Eraclea
- Cianciana
- Comitini
- Favara
- Grotte
- Joppolo Giancaxio
- Lampedusa e Linosa
- Licata
- Lucca Sicula
- Menfi
- Montallegro
- Montevago
- Naro
- Palma di Montechiaro
- Porto Empedocle
- Racalmuto
- Raffadali
- Ravanusa
- Realmonte
- Ribera
- Sambuca di Sicilia
- San Biagio Platani
- San Giovanni Gemini
- Sant'Angelo Muxaro
- Santa Elisabetta
- Santa Margherita di Belice
- Santo Stefano Quisquina
- Sciacca
- Siculiana
- Villafranca Sicula

== Demographics ==
Historical population
Year	Pop.	±%
1861	265,034	—
1871	287,948	+8.6%
1881	313,106	+8.7%
1901	380,666	+21.6%
1911	413,400	+8.6%
1921	429,896	+4.0%
1931	402,648	−6.3%
1936	418,265	+3.9%
1951	471,903	+12.8%
1961	472,945	+0.2%
1971	454,045	−4.0%
1981	466,495	+2.7%
1991	476,158	+2.1%
2001	448,053	−5.9%
2011	446,837	−0.3%
2021	415,887	−6.9%
Source: ISTAT

As of 2026, the population is 407,041, of which 49.0% are male, and 51.0% are female. Minors make up 15.1% of the population, and seniors make up 25.0%.

=== Immigration ===
As of 2025, immigrants make up 7.8% of the population. The 5 largest foreign countries of birth are Germany, Romania, Morocco, Tunisia, and Switzerland.

Foreign population by country of birth (2025)
Country of birth	Population
Germany	7,812
Romania	5,620
Morocco	1,969
Tunisia	1,663
Switzerland	1,562
Belgium	1,482
United Kingdom	1,264
France	1,192
Venezuela	709
Senegal	671
Bangladesh	648
United States	509
The Gambia	491
Brazil	472
China	393

== Economy ==
The economy is primarily based on agriculture and tourism. Port traffic is also moderate, centered on Porto Empedocle, which was once a thriving hub for the sale of sulfur from the Pasquasia mine in Enna and smaller deposits. Today, drought and the inequity of the water supply system make water crises frequent.

According to the government records the number of unemployed people is about 17% of the total labour force.

=== Wine production ===
Viticulture produces fine wines, including Inzolia and Marsala, and sparkling wines, all distinctive and driving forces for a rather depressed economy. The total area covered by vineyards in 1984 was almost triple to that in 1949. During this period Marsala based wine merchants used the grapes produced in the province to produce Marsala wine. In 1984 the local government passed a law that regulated this practice. Around three-quarters of the Sicilian land devoted to growing Fiano grapes is in the province. Some of the important municipalities known for their vineyards include Sambuca di Sicilia, Menfi, and Santa Margherita di Belice.

== Transport ==
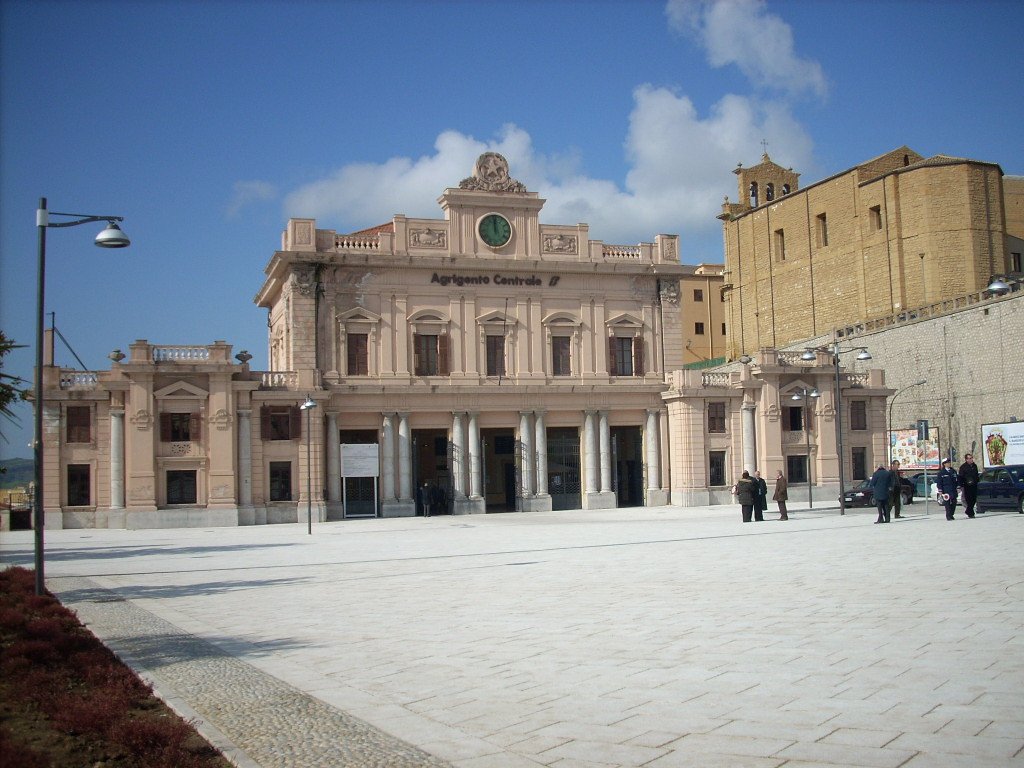
The elegant building of Agrigento's central station and Piazza Marconi

=== Roads ===
The Agrigento area is not served by any highways, having only a few expressways. However, the SS 640 is currently being upgraded to a modern highway from Agrigento to the A19 motorway, passing through Caltanissetta. The road network in the province comprises 540 km. of street roads, 1,000 km. of provincial roads, 260 km. of communal roads and 56 km. of regional roads.

=== Railways ===
The Agrigento area is crossed by three railway lines open to passenger traffic, all operated by RFI, for a total of approximately 150 km: the Palermo-Agrigento line, the Caltanissetta Xirbi-Agrigento line—which meet at the Aragona station—and the Syracuse-Canicattì line. All three lines have single-track electrification, except the Syracuse-Canicattì line, which is not electrified.

== See also ==
- Sicilians
- Sulfur mining in Sicily
- Railway network of Sicily

== Bibliography ==
- Nesto, Bill; Savino, Frances Di (2013). The World of Sicilian Wine. University of California Press. ISBN 978-0-520-95507-3.
