= Joppolo Giancaxio =

Municipality in Sicily, Italy

Joppolo Giancaxio Jòppulu Giancaxiu (Sicilian)
- Comune
- Comune di Joppolo Giancaxio
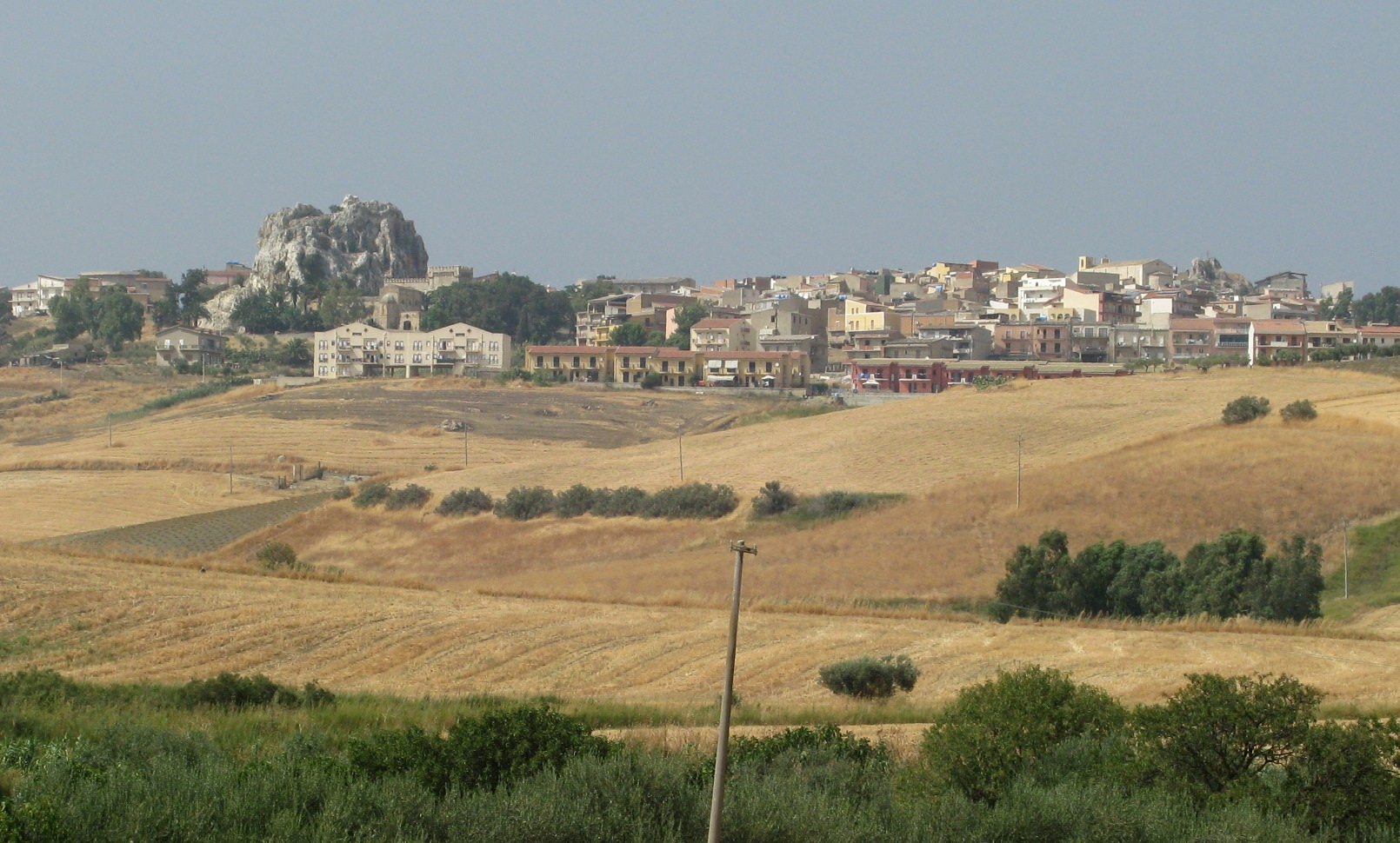
- View of Joppolo Giancaxio

- Location within Italy Location within Sicily
- Coordinates: 37°23′N 13°33′E
- Country: Italy
- Region: Sicily
- Province: Agrigento (AG)

Government
  - Mayor: Angelo Giuseppe Portella

Area
  - Total: 19.14 km^{2} (7.39 sq mi)
- Elevation: 275 m (902 ft)

Population (1 January 2025)
  - Total: 1,062
  - Density: 55.49/km^{2} (143.7/sq mi)
- Demonym: Loppolesi
- Time zone: UTC+1 (CET)
  - Summer (DST): UTC+2 (CEST)
- Postal code: 92010
- Dialing code: 0922

Joppolo Giancaxio (Italian: [ˈjɔppolo dʒaŋˈkaʃʃo]; Sicilian: Jòppulu Giancaxiu or Giancasciu) is a comune (municipality) in the Province of Agrigento in the Italian region Sicily, located about 83 kilometres (52 mi) south of Palermo and about 9 kilometres (5.6 mi) northwest of Agrigento. As of January 2025, it had an estimated 1,062 residents living across 19.14 square kilometers. Governed by a local municipal statute, Joppolo Giancaxio emphasizes transparency, citizen participation, and support for community organizations as an open government.

== Geography and location ==
Joppolo Giancaxio is located about 83 kilometres (52 mi) south of Palermo, the capital of Sicily, and about 9 kilometres (5.6 mi) northwest of Agrigento, the capital of the province.

== Demographics ==
As of January 2025, according to the Italian National Institute of Statistics, Joppolo Giancaxio had an estimated population of 1,062 residents, spread over an area of 19.14 square kilometres (7.39 mi^{2}). This results in a population density of approximately 55.49 inhabitants per square kilometer. The population has experienced a slight decline in recent years, with an annual decrease rate of about 0.68% between 2021 and 2025.

The gender distribution in Joppolo Giancaxio is relatively balanced, with women making up a slight majority at 52.2% (554 individuals), compared to 47.8% men (508 individuals). In terms of age, the population is slightly older: 28.2% of residents are aged 65 and over, while 58.5% are in the working-age group of 18 to 64 years. The youngest demographic, under 18, accounts for 13.3% of the total population.

The vast majority (96.8%) of Joppolo Giancaxio's inhabitants hold Italian citizenship, with a small foreign resident population of 19 individuals, making up just 3.2% of the total.

== Governance and civic life ==
Joppolo Giancaxio is governed by a municipal statute that defines the roles of local institutions. The municipal council interprets regulations, while the mayor and executive body oversee decisions within their areas of responsibility. The municipality encourages citizen participation through public meetings and consultations, promoting dialogue between residents and local authorities. It also maintains a register of community associations, which can receive support for activities that benefit the town.

The statute recognizes the role of voluntary and civic organizations in community life and provides them with encouragement and, when possible, logistical or financial assistance. As an open government, citizens have the right to access public documents and information, ensuring transparency. Local public services are managed with attention to both social goals and economic efficiency.
