= Basilica of St. Sebastian, Barcellona Pozzo di Gotto =

Church in Sicily, Italy

Coordinates: 38.1448°N 15.2167°E

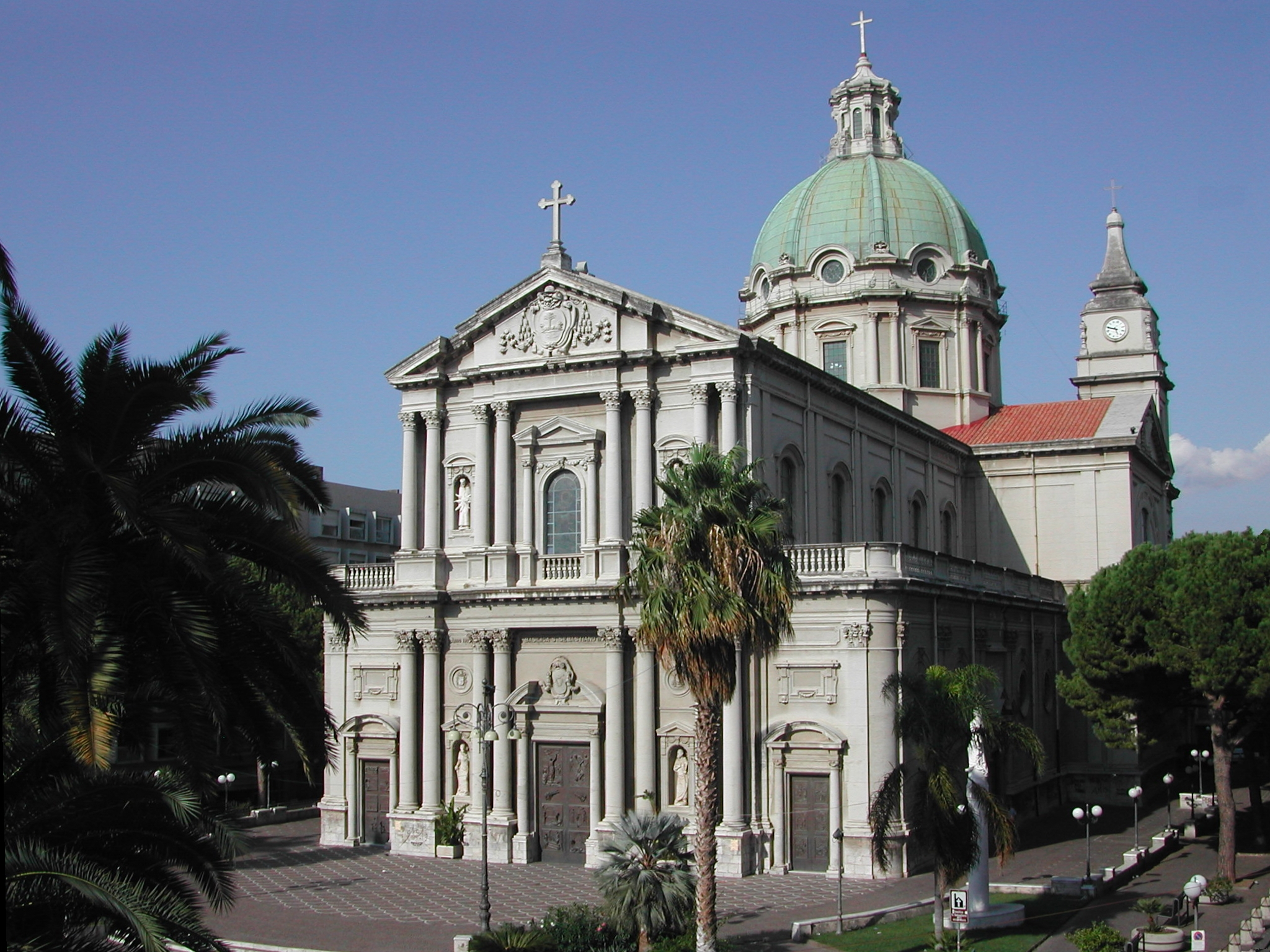
Basilica of San Sebastian

The Basilica of St. Sebastian (Italian: Basilica di San Sebastiano, Duomo di Barcellona Pozzo di Gotto) is a church in Barcellona Pozzo di Gotto, Sicily, Italy, raised to the status of a minor basilica in 1991.

It stands in the Piazza Duomo with its main façade facing the Via Roma. It is the largest of the churches (the duomo) of Barcellona and the second-largest in the whole province of Sicily, only Messina Cathedral being larger. The present church was constructed in the 1930s, replacing an earlier one, under the direction of the engineer Franceso Barbaro (nephew of Monsignor Barbaro); the works were carried out by the firm Fratelli Cardillo, who had previously collaborated with Barbaro in the construction of the Shrine of Christ the King (Sacrario di Cristo Re) in Messina.

Barcellona Pozzo di Gotto is not the seat of a bishop and the basilica is not a cathedral.

== Cult of Saint Sebastian ==
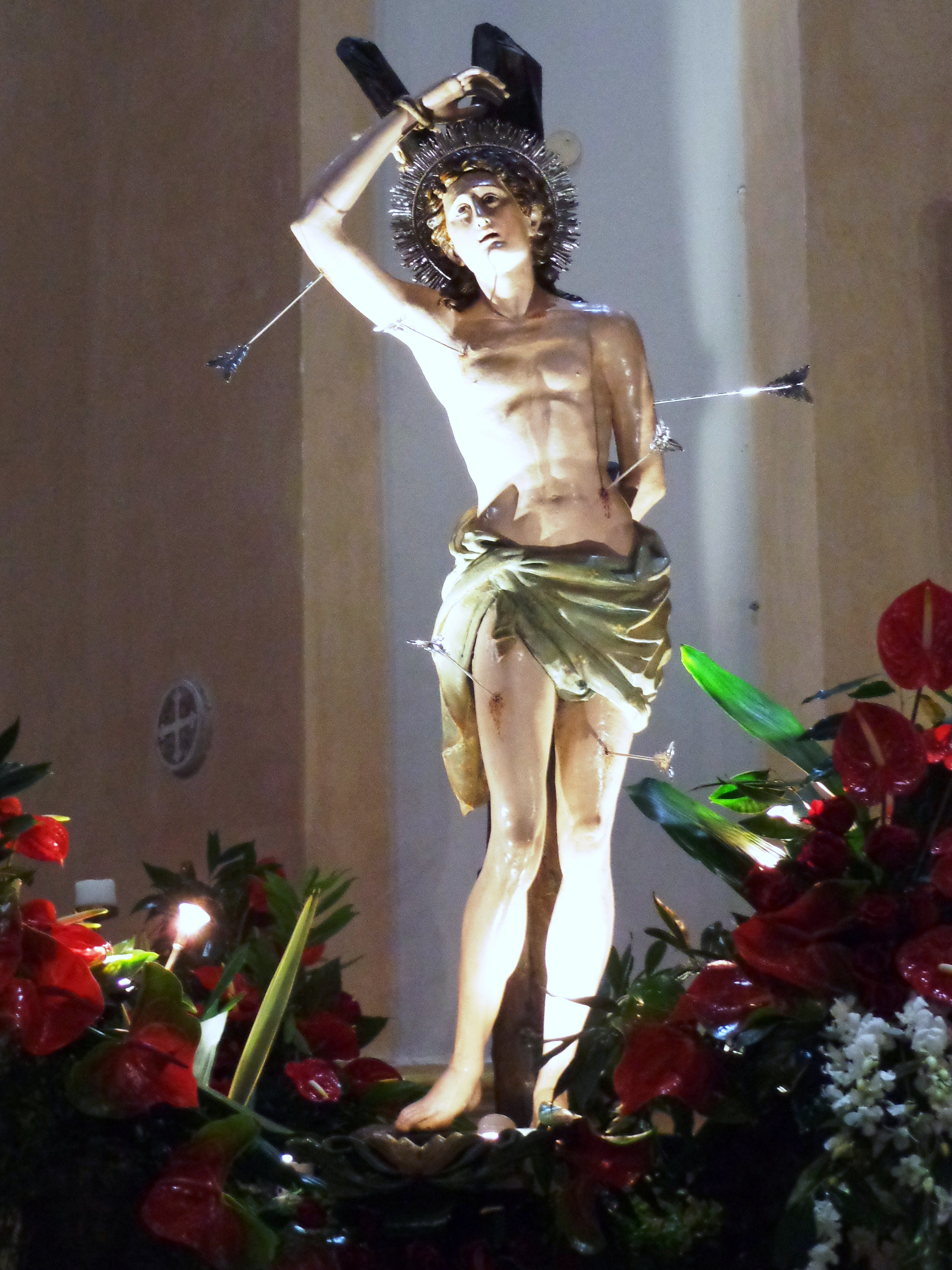
The 18th-century wooden statue of Saint Sebastian in Barcellona Pozzo di Gotto

The cult of Saint Sebastian in many places in Sicily dates back to around 1300, when the martyr of Narbonne, originally from Milan and who was considered the protector against epidemics of bubonic plague, encouraged the construction of many churches. The cult took root in the village of "Barsalona" on the west side of the river Longano and fraction of Castroreale around 1500, replacing the then patron St. Nicholas of Bari. St. Sebastian's miraculous survival despite the many perforating arrows was transposed onto a figure who became the holy intercessor against outbreaks of disease. The Black Death (in north Italy, better known as the plague of St. Charles Borromeo) assailed the island in 1347, 1449, 1524, and 1575–1578.

== The basilica ==
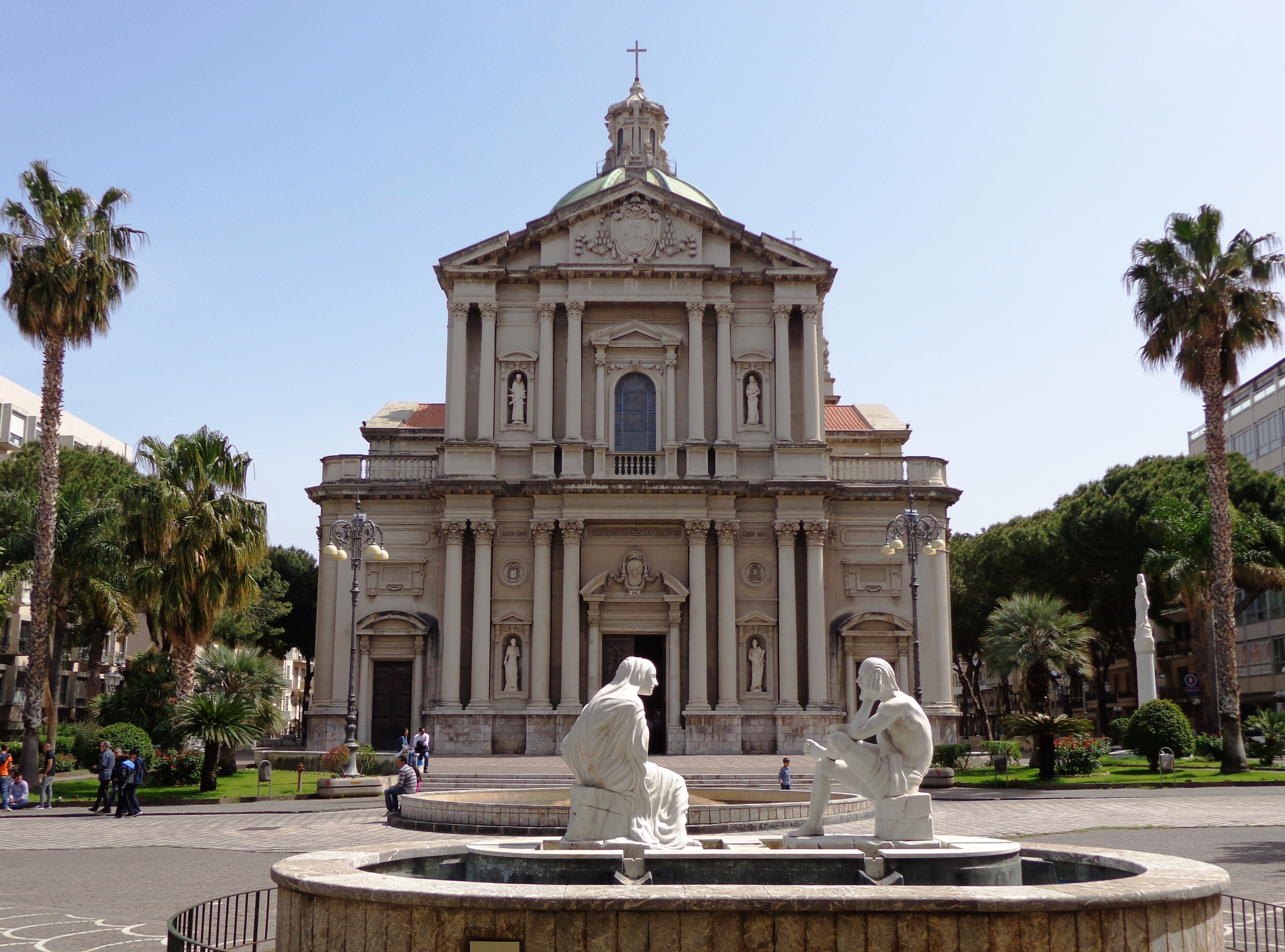
Façade of the basilica

Following the administrative merger of Barcellona and Pozzo di Gotto in 1836, the doubling of the population required a new larger church. The project was accelerated by the disastrous 1908 Messina earthquake that damaged the old church of St. Sebastian, dating from 1606, and made it unusable. The old church would also have blocked the construction of the Via Roma, the natural access to the railway station. Together with the adjacent Chiesa degli Agonizzanti ("Church of the Dying"), the Placido Mandanici Theatre (destroyed by fire in 1967) and the Monte di Pietà, it formed the old city of Barcellona until it was completely demolished during the building of the new church.

After the adoption of the plan on April 1, 1931, construction started on January 25, 1932, and ended on October 30, 1935. The church was inaugurated on March 25, 1936, by the Archbishop of Messina, Monsignor Angelo Paino. The laying out of the square in front ended with the elevation of the church to the status of a minor basilica by Cardinal Angelo Sodano on September 18, 1992.

=== Façade ===
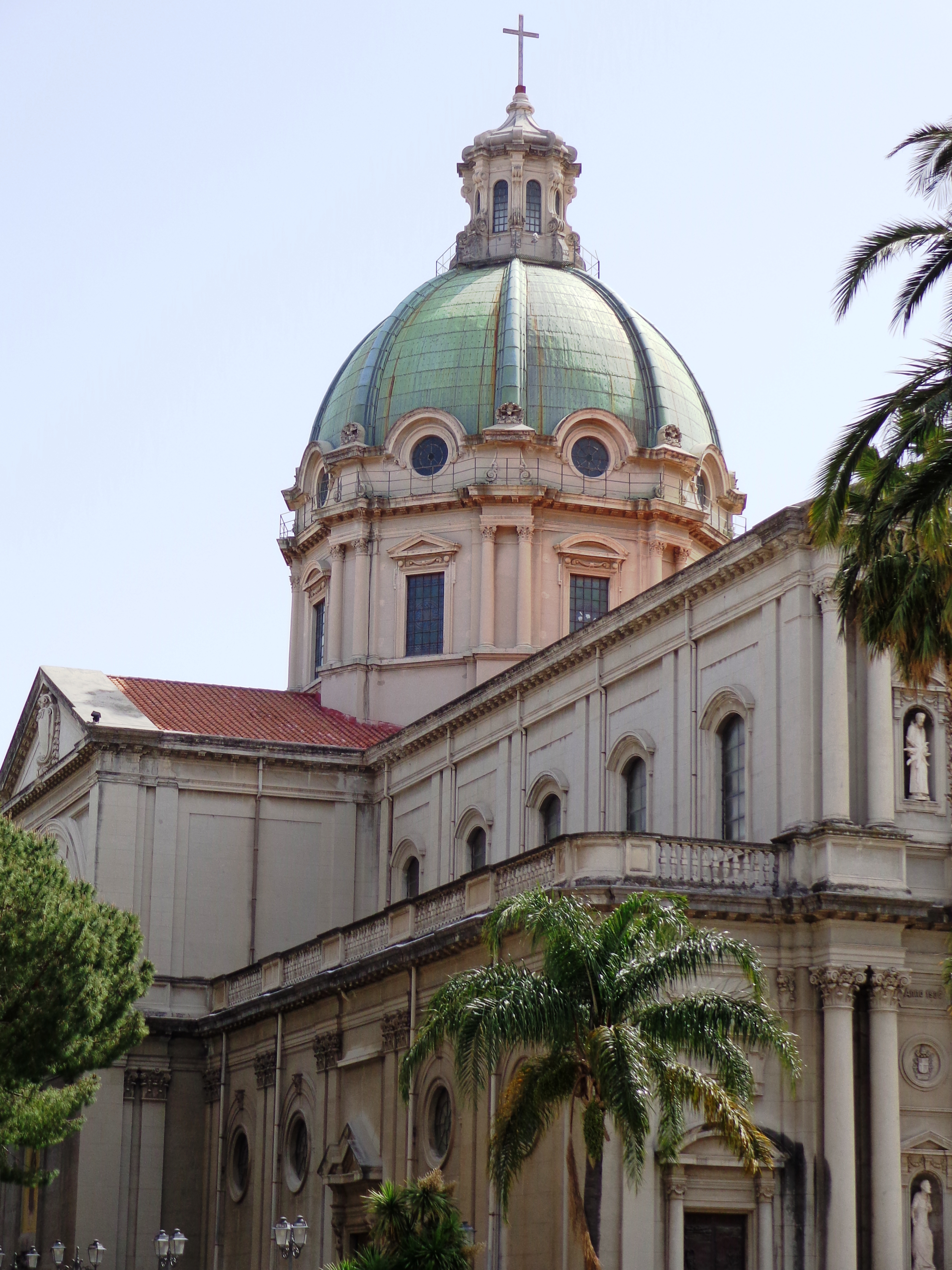
Northern side of the basilica

The basilica's façade is reminiscent of that of the Basilica of Sant'Andrea della Valle in Rome. The dome drew inspiration from that of Filippo Juvarra for the Basilica of Superga in Turin. The twin ribs of Juvarra's Turin dome, simplified and lightened, also appear in the dome of the Shrine of Christ the King. Likewise, the dome for the new church of Barcellona was similar to that of the New Cathedral of Brescia in shape, size and style, although the latter lacked the small circular windows round the base. In the Barcellona church, the terraces covering the side aisles are much wider, allowing the construction of two small front entrances.

The façade is a modern representation of the neo-classical style with two rows of columns surmounted by Corinthian capitals framing the main window, the main entrance and the side niches. The eight central columns are slightly advanced with respect to the side group, and the four central columns further advanced, enclosing an embossed tympanum of a lively and dynamic character. Within the gable of the tympanum is a frieze decorated with carved elements of cardinal's symbols and festoons bearing a palm tree between two lions. The coat of arms and motto "SOLUS CUM SOLO DEO" can be traced back to the order of Saint Paul.

Entrances and windows are framed by columns surmounted by arched triangular tympani. The niches are surmounted by triangular arched pediments. The niches of the main façade contain four statues of Saint Peter, Saint Paul, Saint Francis of Assisi and Saint Catherine of Siena by Domenico Farina, which contrast with the white of the marble statues and the stonework from the quarries of Billiemi and Comiso.

On the inner wall of the entrance from top to bottom and from right to left are frescoes created by Gino Colapietro in 1997 depicting "The Creation","The Expulsion from Eden" or " Original Sin", "God and the Tables of the Commandments" and "The Baptism in the Jordan".

=== Main nave ===
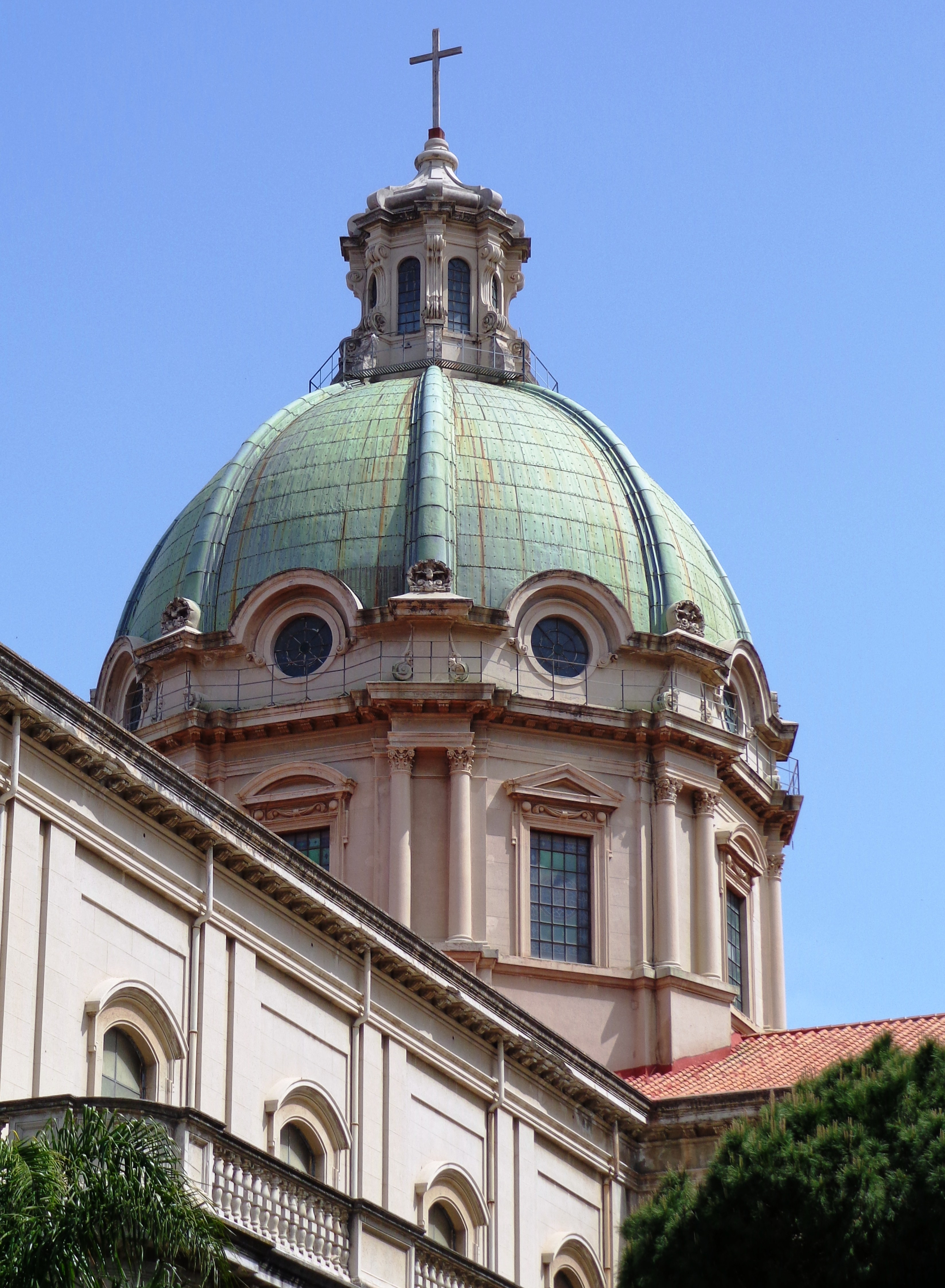
Dome from the south side

The basilica is in the form of a Latin cross with a large central nave under a barrel vault adorned with friezes, rosettes and stucco.

The interior space is divided into three naves by means of strong pillars carrying large arches embellished by twin pilasters. The central nave is about 25 meters long from the inner entrance to the transept, 16 meters wide and 23 meters high, and both visually and acoustically constitutes the main architectural feature of the building. Within the five arches of each side aisle are arranged six altars and two side entrances.

=== Right aisle, south side ===
- In the first bay to the right is a marble inscription reproducing the text of the papal bull dated 9 November 1989 from Pope John Paul II decreeing the church's elevation to basilica status. The elevation took place on 9 February 1991, with a dedication ceremony on 18 September 1992.
- Second bay: Altar dedicated to Our Lady of the Dying (Madonna degli Agonizzanti) from the nearby Chiesa degli Agonizzanti (Church of the Dying) from the end of the 16th or early 17th century with an altarpiece by Philip Jannelli (circa 1621 – 1696) painted in oil on canvas of Our Lady of the Dying in which the Virgin is depicted between Saint Michael the Archangel, Saint Camillus de Lellis and Saint Joseph (1655, possibly). The elevation of the altar consists of pilasters surmounted by a symmetrical arched pediment. At the centre is a refined tabernacle depicting a Roman temple colonnade surmounted by a crown.
- Third bay: Entrance from the south side.
- Fourth bay: Altar dedicated to the Patriarch Saint Joseph brought from the old church (end of the 16th or early 17th century). The altarpiece is a 1942 painting of Saint Joseph by Santa Rugolo. The elevation is pilasters surmounted by a symmetrical arched pediment with central stele. The altar table has a precious marble frontal.
- Fifth bay: Altar dedicated to Our Lady of Graces, patron saint of the city, from the old church, with pilasters surmounted by symmetrical arched pediment with central stele.

=== Left aisle, north side ===
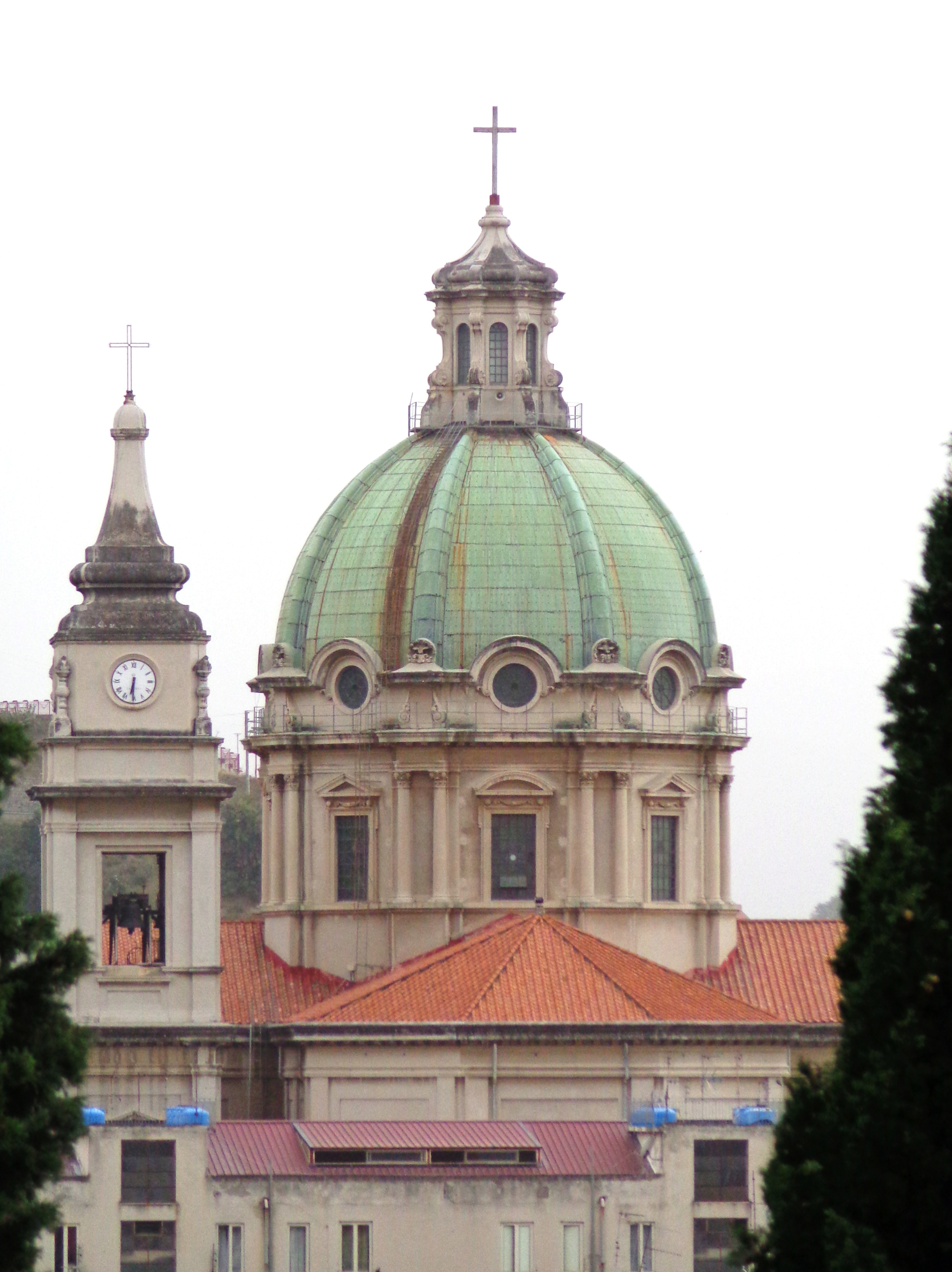
View from Pozzo di Gotto

- In the first bay on the left was originally placed the baptismal font now moved to be near to the main altar. On the walls a commemorative plaque records the naming date of March 25, 1936, and the dedication date of June 8, 1936, and a second plaque credits the construction of the church to the Archbishop of Messina, Monsignor Angelo Paino.
- Second bay: Altar dedicated to Saint Anthony of Padua, made in 1940, with pilasters surmounted by symmetrical pediment with central stele. In the niche is a statue of Saint Anthony.
- Third bay: Entrance from the north side.
- Fourth bay: Altar dedicated to the Triumph of the Cross between Jesus and Mary from the old church, with pilasters surmounted by symmetrical arched pediment with central stele and a precious marble altar frontal. The altarpiece by Filippo Jannelli is "Jesus and Mary and the Triumph of the Cross", painted in oil on canvas.
- Fifth bay: Altar dedicated to the Sacred Heart of Jesus from the old church. It has a double pair of columns, the innermost advanced and surmounted by a symmetrical pediment.

=== Transept ===
In the south transept is a modern linear marble altar in the classical style by Antonino Antonuccio, consisting of pillars (pilasters) combined with Corinthian capitals and surmounted by a symmetrical pediment with two volutes supporting a disc under a vase. At either and of the entablature are two further vases. In a niche framed by pilasters and an arched tympanum is preserved an 18th-century wooden statue of Saint Sebastian which is carried in procession. Overlooking the choir is a 17th-century painting depicting scenes from the life of Saint Christopher. In the fresco depicting the Miraculous shoal of fishes by Gino Colapietro (1994) on the north wall of the transept, the features of the characters recall the faces of local citizens amongst which the face of the then archpriest stands out. Below are three austere but valuable denominational works by the local cabinetmaker Antonio Genovese based on drawings by Salvatore Crinò from the 1960s. In a square frame is a painting of the Virgin and Child with Saint Francis by Gaspare Camarda (1606).

There are also four mosaics depicting The Annunciation, The Nativity, The Adoration of the Magi and The Presentation of Jesus in the Temple by Claudio Traversi. On the external wall are reproduced the figures of Saint Nicholas of Bari and Saint Francis of Paola behind the bronze statue of Saint Pio of Pietrelcina (2001).

--------------- North transept -------------------	---------------- South transept -------------------
The Nativity	The Annunciation
Saint Nicholas of Bari (External)	Saint Francesco of Paola (External)
The Adoration of the Magi	The Presentation of Jesus in the Temple

=== Altar ===
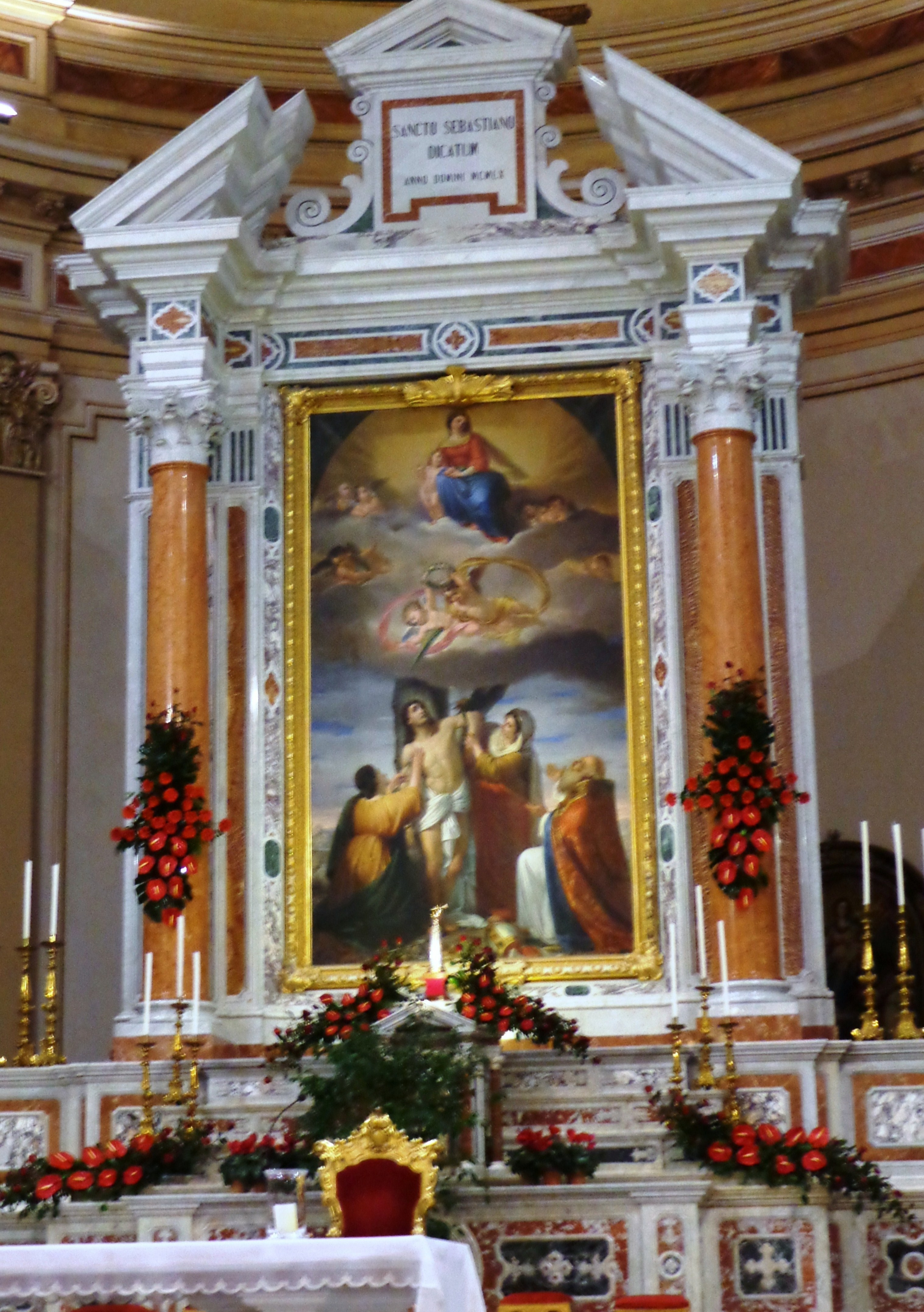
Main altar

The main altar is made of polychrome marble, in the form of the elevation of a Roman temple with a symmetrical double interrupted pediment with central memorial stele. The whole recalls the style of the façade. Between the columns with their Corinthian capitals is a canvas depicting the Martyrdom of Saint Sebastian where Irene of Rome in mourning retrieves the body of the saint, and a maid and Saint Nicholas of Bari (former protector of the village of Barsalona) are kneeling, the work of Giacomo Conti in 1879. Completing the scene the Madonna in Glory, with Our Lady of Graces, the co-patron saint of Barcellona Pozzo di Gotto, is pictured between hosts of angels, cherubim and seraphim, thrones and dominations. The marblework was undertaken by Salvatore Manganaro, directed by Maria Mento and Angela Mento, and completed in 1960.

The Christ Pantocrator in the apse is the work of Filippo Minolfi and was created in 1984. The basilica contains many paintings of the 17th and 18th centuries. On the left side of the altar stands a 19th-century painting by Cesare De Napoli depicting the Madonna of Carmel with Saint Roch, Saint Paulinus of Nola and Saint Catherine of Alexandria.

=== Doors ===
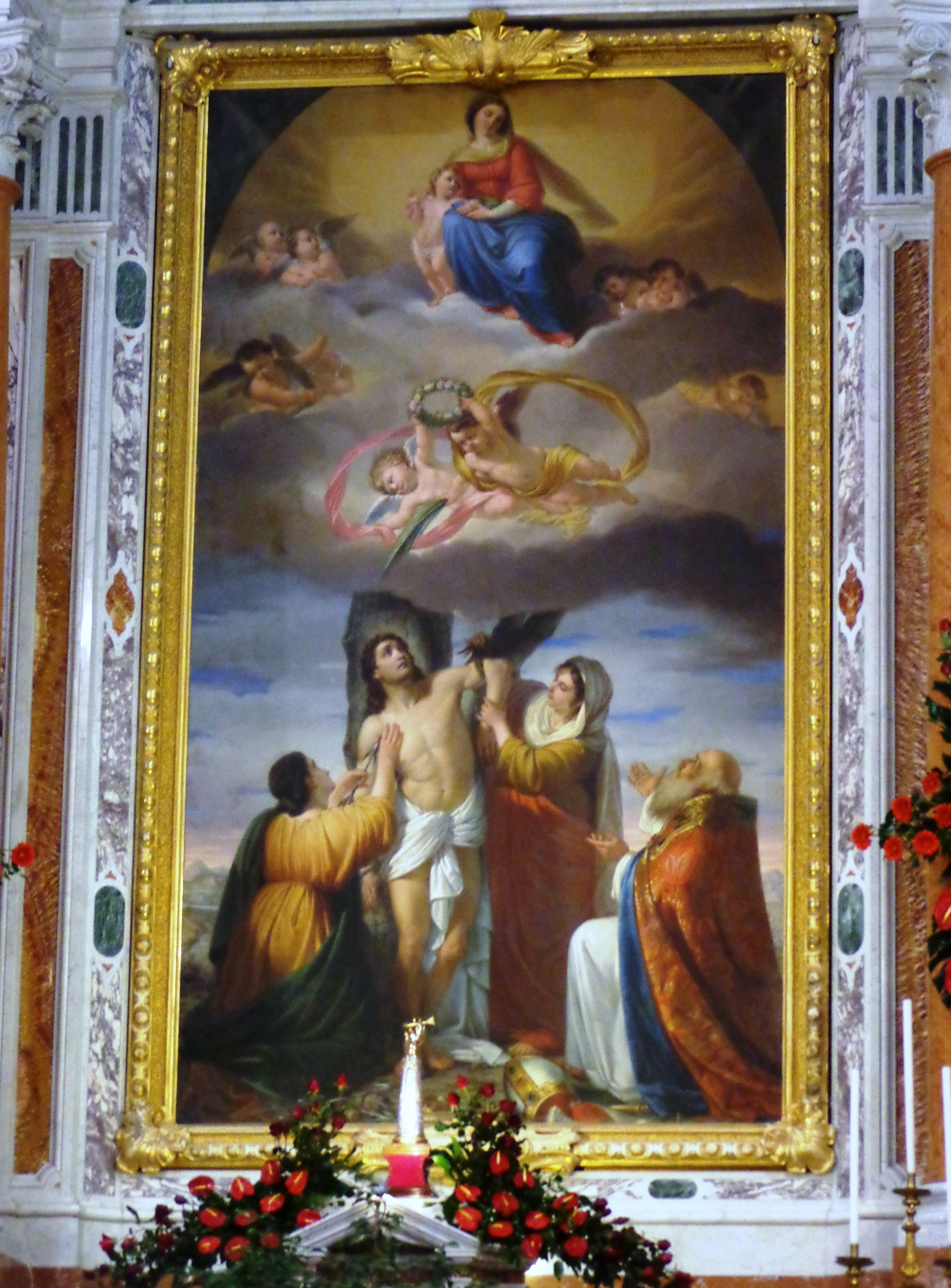
Altarpiece of the main altar

The approach to the basilica from the front is secured by three doors, at one time made of wood but now of bronze.

The great bronze door of the nave by Ennio Tesei has six panels depicting scenes from the life of Saint Sebastian: The first martyrdom with arrows, The second martyrdom with flogging to death (the palms of martyrdom are the handles of the two doors), The care of St. Irene, The Sermons of St. Sebastian, The meeting with the Emperor Diocletian and The Cloaca Maxima, created in 1990. The door is topped with a fluted frieze bearing the symbols of martyrdom: the arrows and a crown and palm.

The right door, the work of George Luzzietti, has panels depicting Pentecost, Ascension, The Multiplication of the Loaves and Fishes, The Miraculous, The Marriage at Cana and The Resurrection of Lazarus.

The left door, the work of Claudio Traversi in 1991, has panels depicting scenes from the Flood, The Tables of the Law and the Burning Bush, The Church of the Basilian, the old church of St. Sebastian, the new basilica and a panel dedicated to Monsignor Angelo Paino, called The Rebuilder.

=== Dome ===
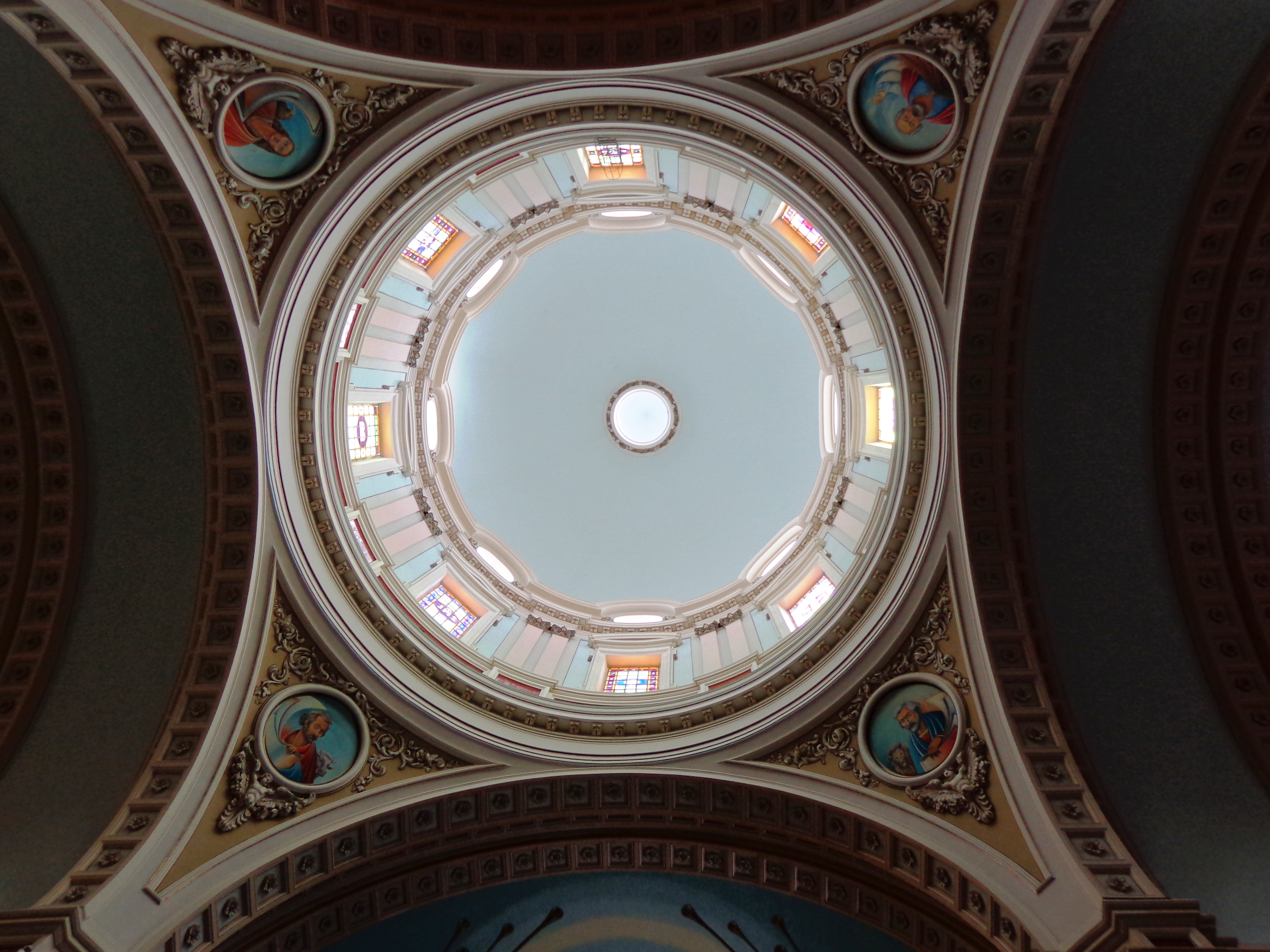
The Evangelists in the pendentives of the dome

The dome, emblem of the basilica and one of the symbols of the entire city, is 16 meters in diameter and 8 meters in height, surmounted by an octagonal lantern. It is illuminated by eight windows arranged around the drum and eight oculi arranged around the cap.

It rests on a high octagonal drum with eight rectangular windows, separated by ribs defined on the outside by pairs of coupled columns. At the base of each rib are shells containing doves.

Internally the four pendentives at the base of the drum are decorated with the four Evangelists, created in 1986 by Filippo Minolfi. The eight rectangular windows on the drum of the dome were made in the early 1990s by Salvatore Gervasi.

=== Further detail ===
The Basilica of Saint Sebastian is the second largest Catholic church in the province of Messina.

Several events, especially the elevation to basilica status, have led to modifications, principally the disappearance of the original front staircase, the balustrade and railing that separated the transept from the high altar, the "table" under the dome that was replaced by the table altar "coram populo", the rearrangement of some of the works on display and the paintings that encircle the altar, and the replacement of the old windows with stained glass. In 2000, the new Chapel of the Confessions, the Chapel of the Holy Sacrament, was constructed and the rooms of the parish offices and corridors completely rearranged. The sacristy was fully restored with a new marble floor and new cabinets, the layout of the presbytery changed with a new pulpit, the baptismal font and the organ console moved and the wooden stage for the choir in the right transept built.

- Windows in the apse: "Sacred Heart" on the right side, by the brothers Lindo Grassi and Alessandro Grassi (1970) and "Immaculate Heart of Mary" on the left side, the work of Cupelloni (1992).
- "Saint Sebastian" in the window of the main façade loggia, also by the brothers Grassi.
- Windows in the nave: "Resurrection", "The Crucifixion", "Saint Thomas the Apostle and Saint Jude", "Saint Dominic and Saint Francis of Assisi", "Saint Eustochia Smeralda Calafato and Saint Clare of Assisi", "Saint Andrew and Saint Philip", "Saint James, son of Zebedee and Saint Bartholomew", "Saint Peter and Saint Paul", "Saint Simon and Saint Matthew", "Saint John the Evangelist and Saint Matthias", "Saint Nicholas and Saint Basil", "Saint Agatha and Saint Lucia" (all created by Father Alberto Farina in 1991).
- Windows round chapels: "Sacred Heart of Jesus", "Our Lady of Fatima", "Saint Joseph", "Souls in Purgatory", "Triumph of the Cross", "Saint Anthony of Padua", "The Holy Spirit", " Saint Christopher" (all created by Claudio Traversi in 1992).
- Windows in the drum of the Dome: Eight rectangular windows in the drum of the dome by Salvatore Gervasi.

=== Choir ===
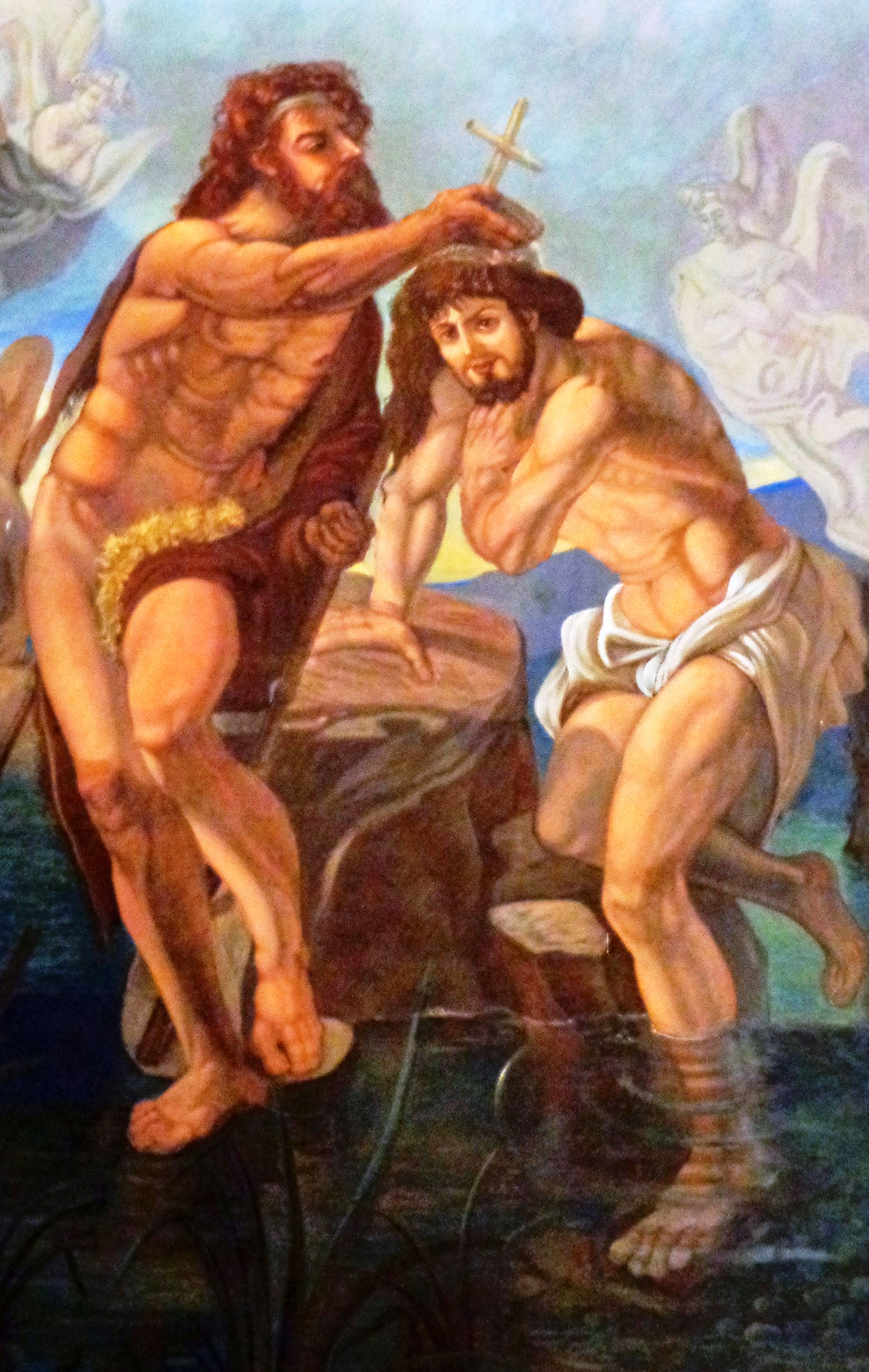
Fresco by Gino Colapietro (1997) in the counterfaçade of the Baptism in the Jordan

The choir is composed of wooden seats in a classical style, made in September 1985 by Sanyi Diletti, designed by Angela and Maria Mento.

=== Organ ===
The organ of the basilica was built by Tamburini of Crema, Lombardy, in 1967. The organ is in two parts, located in the transepts of the choir of the basilica, the Cornu Epistulae and the Cornu Evangelii, and consists of 2,760 pipes, a console with three keyboards, 61 keys, 32 pedals and 41 real sound registers. After the instrument of Messina Cathedral, it was at the time of installation the second largest organ in the entire province.

=== Bells ===
In 1989 nine new bells from Catania foundry, the largest of which are 109 cm in diameter and perfectly matched in gradual decreasing tone replaced the bells from the old church. Finally, a carillon clock complete with four quadrants of 169 cm in diameter each was installed.

== Sacristy ==
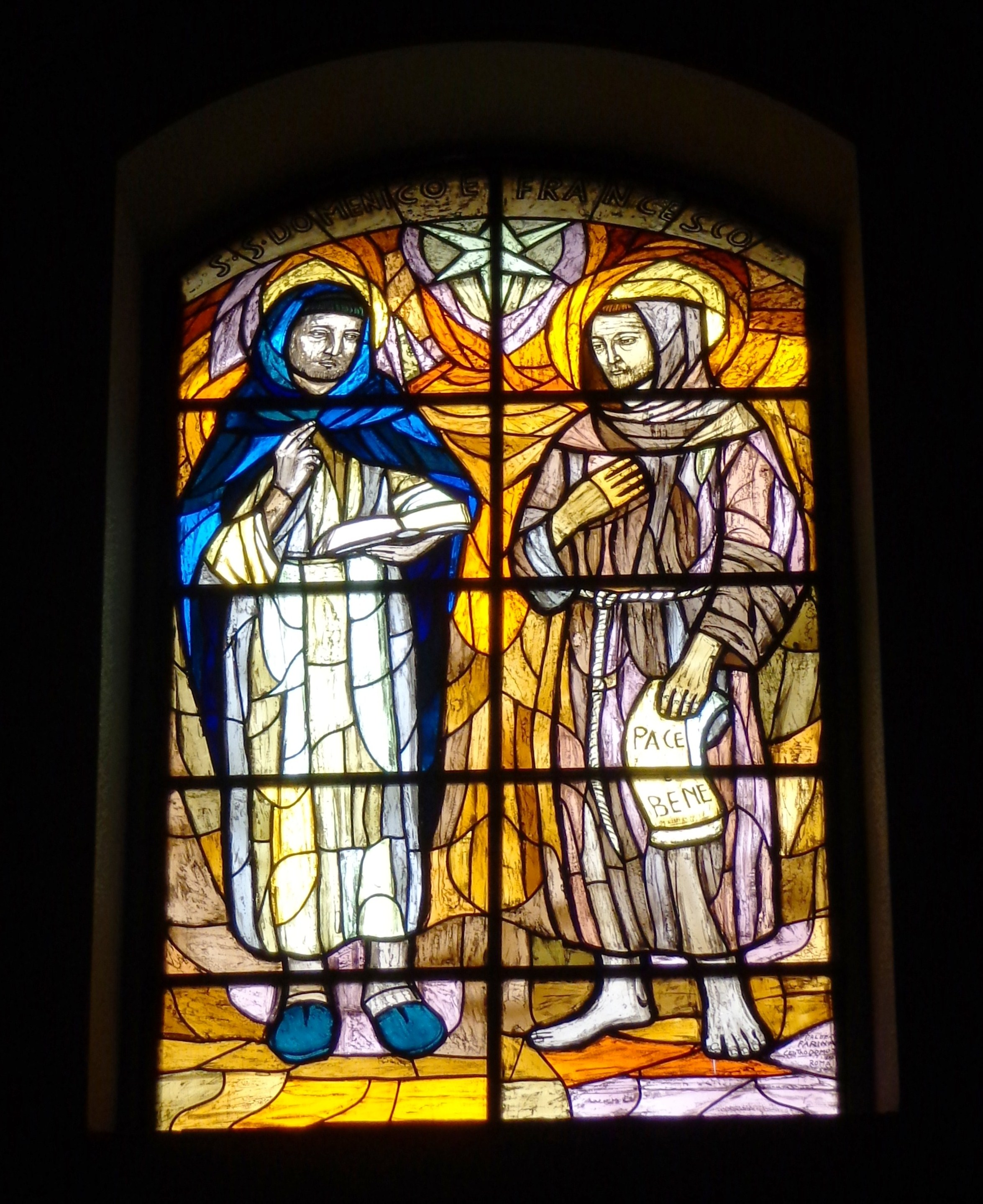
Stained glass window by Vetrate depicting Saints Francis and Dominic

In the sacristy, located behind the apse and communicating with the ambulatory and transept on both sides, are kept the sarcophagus of the philanthropist Giovanni Spagnolo (1791); a marble statue of the Madonna of the Rest (end of the 16th or early 17th century); ten canvases in a frame with scenes from the life of Saint Sebastian (18th century) and an organ casing with wooden carvings from the early 18th century.

== Archpriests ==
The archpriest is the dean over the priests of the parish, responsible for the proper performance of ecclesiastical duties and the lifestyle of the priests submitted to their observance.

- Archpriest Nunziato Bonsignore, 1914 to 1941
- Monsignor Domenico D'Arro
- Monsignor Salvatore Stracquadaini
- Monsignor Francesco Mento (1911–2007), 1958 to 2001
- Father Francesco Farsaci, from 2001

== Other ==
- Until the early 1900s during the processions of 20 January it was the custom to throw chickpeas against the statue of the saint as a devotional act of liberation from sin, a custom no longer allowed by the ecclesiastical authorities. Another anthropological aspect inherent to the act is the form of thanksgiving for having fed the prisoners and the poor in Rome and for the work of evangelization carried out at the cost of supreme sacrifice.
- The Ciaurrina is a stretched candy bar typical of Barcellona, made during the festival of Saint Sebastian, where the initial pressing of the honeydough is reminiscent of the tension of the bow and the firing of the arrows.
- The phrase U brazzu di San Bastianu. In the cathedral is a priceless relic that is the bone of the forearm of the holy martyr called the Brazzu of San Bastianu, often quoted in local sayings such as ... the intervention of the Brazzu of San Bastianu is needed!, invoked at a time when an important and decisive aid would be favourable.

== Gallery ==
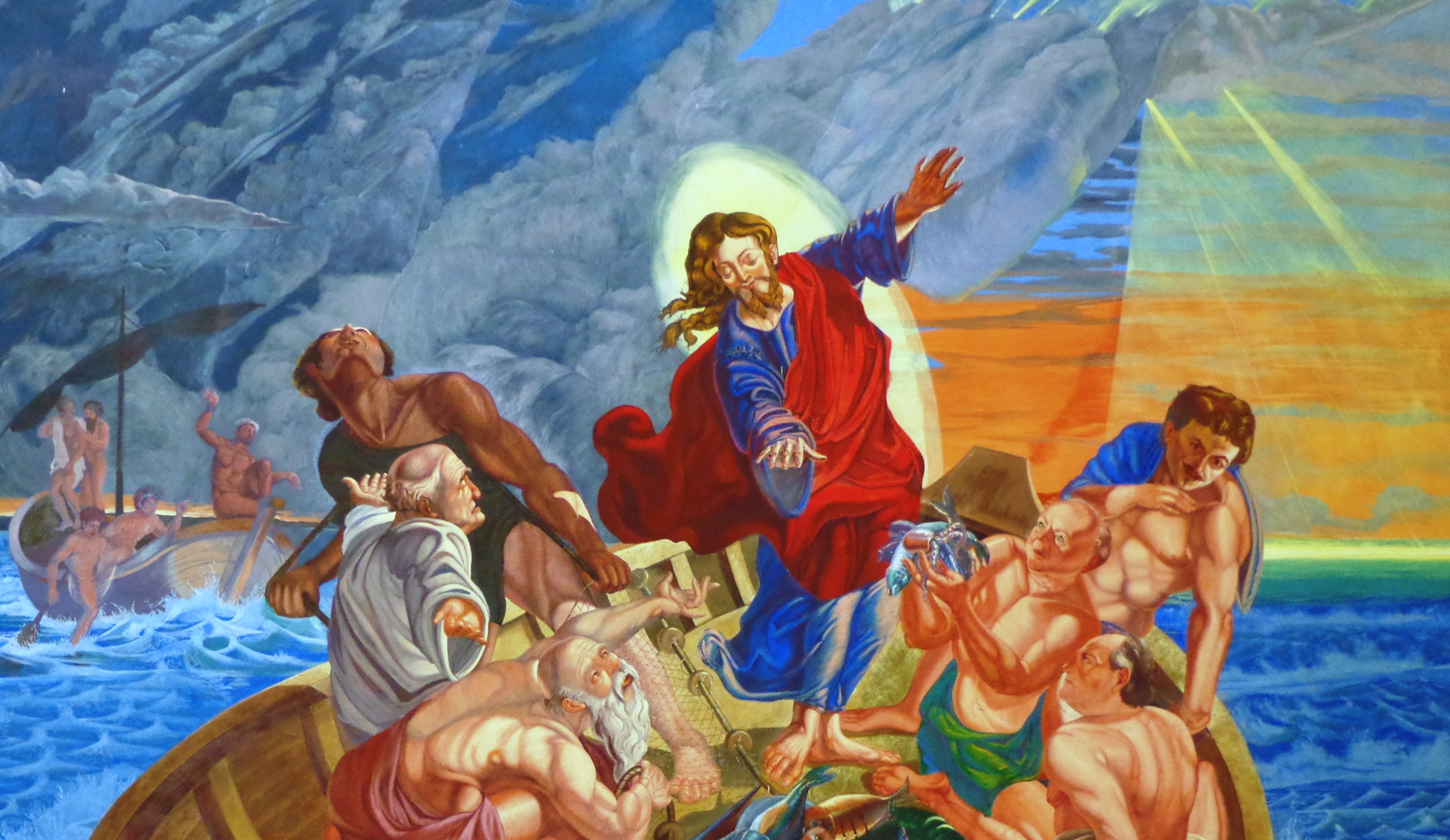
Fresco, north wall

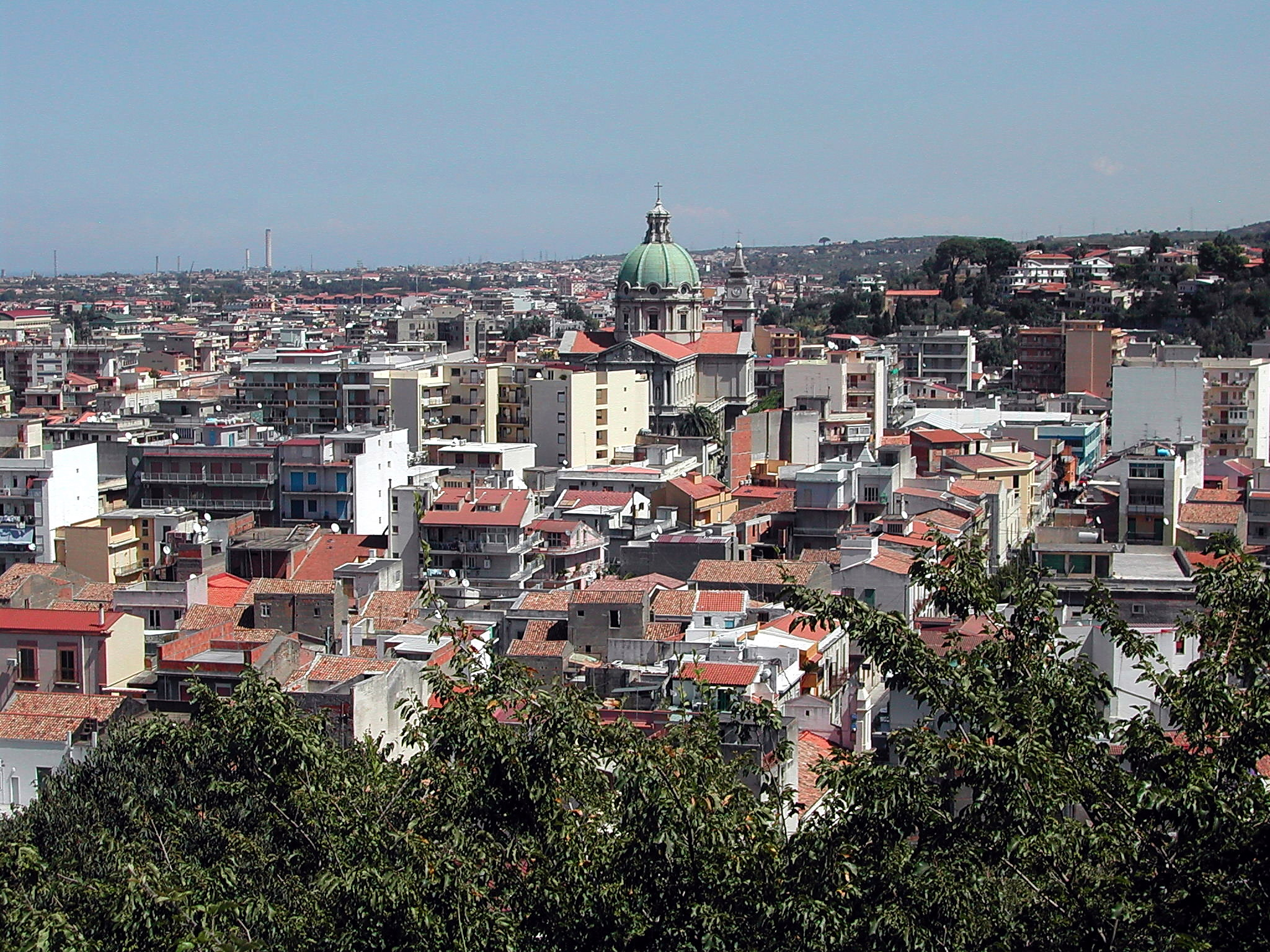
Panorama of Barcellona Pozzo di Gotto showing dome of the basilica

== See also ==
- History of Roman Catholicism in Italy
