= Jalari in Corto =

The international film festival, Jalari in Corto, is held annually at Parco Jalari in Barcellona Pozzo di Gotto in Sicily. It began in the summer of 2004, having been conceived by young people of the cultural-ethnographic association Associazione Culturale Etnografica Ambientale “Jalari” and by Andrea Italiano. Its aim has been to promote, raise awareness and bring the art of cinema, and the communicative power of artistic expression in general, to as many people as possible through short films and meetings with authors, actors and critics. Year after year, the event has gained great fame, standing today as a springboard for both national and international young cinematic artists to gain exposure to a wider audience and increase visibility.

The festival offers film awards in several categories:

1. Italian language (or subtitled in Italian);
2. Foreign language (subtitled in English);
3. Schools.

Awards in 2012 were given to:

- Best short film - Nostos (Alessandro D'Ambrosi)
- Best direction - Io sono morta (Francesco Picone)
- Best actor - Anna Gigante in Linea Nigra (Anna Gigante)
- Best photography - Vodka Tonic (Ivano Fachin)
- Best foreign-language film - La miradaperdida (Damian Dionisio)
