= Isgro =

Isgro (sometimes accented Isgrò or Isgró) is an Italian surname. Notable people with the surname include:

- Emilio Isgrò (born 1937), Italian artist
- Joe Isgro (born 1948), American gangster
- Rodrigo Isgró (born 1999), Argentine rugby union player
