= Placido Mandanici =

Italian composer

Placido Mandanici (1798, Barcellona Pozzo di Gotto – 1852, Genoa) was an Italian composer. He is best known for his operas. He graduated from the Music Lyceum in Palermo (1820), and then studied at Naples with Pietro Raimondi. In 1829 his first opera, L'isola disabitata, premiered in Naples.

From 1834 to 1848 he worked in Milan as an opera and ballet composer and taught at the Milan Conservatory. He was a friend of Gaetano Donizetti and was a part of the artistic circle centered on Countess Yuliya Samoylova. To Samoylova he dedicated his opera Il buontempone di Porta Ticinese (1841). Mandanici spent the last years of his life in Genoa.
