= Giuseppina Vadalà =

Italian patriot (1824–1914)

Giuseppina Vadalà (Italian pronunciation: [dʒuzepˈpiːna vadaˈla]; 1824 in Messina – 7 October 1914 in Santiago de Chile) was an Italian patriot.

== Biography ==
=== Revolutionary activity ===
Two heroic young women act more by example than with words. Giuseppina and Paolina Vadalà, musket in hand, move through the streets, faces glowing, hot with the most energetic love of their country. The men follow them. The royals cannot resist this forceful wave; they run and seek refuge under the cannons of Don Blasco Fort, from whence they do not dare move a step for the rest of the day and the following night.

— Candido Augusto Vecchi, La Italia: storia di due anni, 1848-1849

Giuseppina Vadalà fought together with her sister Paolina during the Siege of Messina, the revolt for Italian unification that took place in Messina on September 5, 1848.

Messinese by birth, she was the daughter of the patriot Pietro Vadalà and wife of Orazio Nicosia, another fighter who joined the revolt against the Bourbons of Naples. Giuseppina had three children: Totò, Orazio, and Bianca. When her elder son Totò grew up, he decided to move to Naples, where he threw himself, heart and soul, into the cause of Italian unification. When her daughter Bianca was grown to womanhood, she married Giovanni Bovio, a noted philosopher and republican politician.

The Italian government awarded Vadalà the Silver Medal of Military Valor for her part in pro-unification battles during the years 1848–1849 and 1860.

=== Castroreale and Cristo Lungo ===
According to the historical account that describes the tradition of the Messinese religious feast of Cristo Lungo in Castroreale, Giuseppina Vadalà moved to that municipality in 1854, because her husband Orazio Nicosia got a job there. Soon after they had arrived in Castroreale, Vadalà became ill with cholera due to a severe epidemic in Messina where she had contracted it. All her strength was ebbing away to the point of death. It was then that her husband went onto the balcony of their house and knelt in prayer before the statue there, which bore the image of the crucified Jesus. Right after this occurrence Vadalà rallied and regained her health, and for the people of Castroreale, it was a miracle. Orazio Nicosia donated twenty gold oncias for outfitting the statue. From that August 25 onward, the feast of the Crucified Jesus was consecrated in the town.

=== South America and death ===
Later on, Giuseppina Vadalà emigrated to South America, to the country of Chile. She died on 7 October 1914, in Santiago de Chile. The historical accounts lament the lack of interest in honouring her shown by the municipality of Messina at her death. It was limited to a mention of her in the city bulletin for the month of November. On the other hand, in South America Vadalà had a procession with great funerary honours celebrated by the Italian community residing in Chile and with the presence of politicians and diplomats of the two countries. The eulogy was given by one Professor Noè, recalling her virtue and acts of valour. She was laid to rest in the Chilean mausoleum of the Italian Society.

== See also ==
- Giuseppa Bolognara Calcagno
