= Giuseppa Bolognara Calcagno =

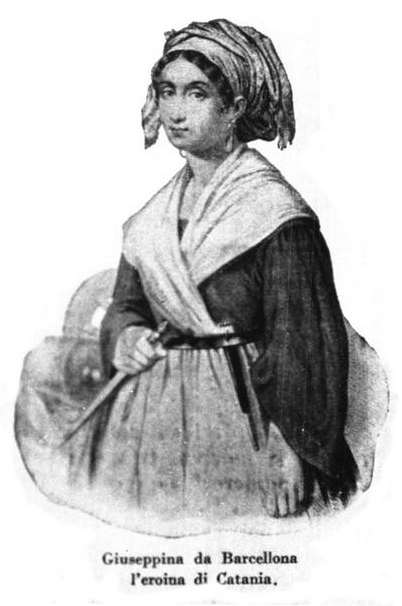
The patriot in a 19th-century print, captioned as "Josephine from Barcellona, the heroine of Catania."

Giuseppa Bolognara Calcagno (Italian pronunciation: [dʒuˈzɛppa boloɲˈɲaːra kalˈkaɲɲo]), better known as Peppa la cannoniera (Josie the Cannoneer), in Sicilian: Peppa a cannunera, (Barcellona Pozzo di Gotto, 1826–1884), was an Italian patriot.

== Biography ==
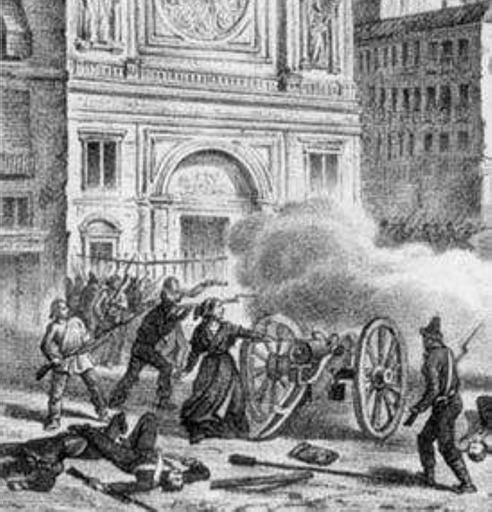
Giuseppa Bolognara Calcagno, known as Peppa la cannoniera, in an engraving by Giuseppe Sciuti

She was born in Barcellona Pozzo di Gotto, near Messina, Sicily, in 1826, although according to some she was born in 1846.

She began life as a foundling. Her surname "Bolognara" or "Calcagno" (often both are used) came from the nurse she was entrusted to, having been abandoned by her biological parents. It is said that after a difficult childhood growing up at an orphanage in Catania, she became the servant of a Catanian innkeeper; she may also have worked in the stables. Bolognara Calcagno is not mentioned for her "virtuousness," the main trait by which women were judged in that era, given that she had a relationship with a man much younger than her, and for this she was degraded in the eyes of 19th-century society. This young man, a stable boy by trade, was named Vanni. It appears that through her relationship with Vanni, Bolognara Calcagno wound up involved in the revolutionary movements for Italian unification that took place in 1860.

On 31 May of that year, there was an anti-Bourbon insurrection in Catania where the rebels, led by Col. Giuseppe Poulet, resisted the attack by Neapolitan troops. On that occasion, Bolognara Calcagno, amid the clashes in the streets of Catania, took the initiative and succeeded in taking the enemy by surprise. She seized an unguarded cannon, pulling it along herself with the aid of a rope and some other patriots nearby. Taking a position near the Piazza del Duomo, she placed some gunpowder at the cannon's mouth. When two squadrons of Bourbon cavalry appeared in the piazza she applied fire to it, simulating a cannon blast.

Hearing the blast and feeling confident that Peppa's cannon was no longer loaded, they charged at her to regain their lost ground, but the woman, remaining courageously steadfast at her post, waited for them, ready to open fire with the cannon she had commandeered. She waited until they were a few meters away before firing the real shot at them, inflicting considerable damage. It was thus that Giuseppa Bolognara succeeded in scoring a direct hit on the Bourbon army and then made it to safety. However, her young companion Vanni did not survive the battle.

Having escaped from the area of combat, she succeeded in getting the cannon to safety in Mascalucia, where the revolutionaries who supported the formation of Italy had their headquarters.

When the Neapolitan troops withdrew from Catania on 3 June, Bolognara Calcagno remained with the revolutionaries, fulfilling the role of vivandière. But when it came time to take Syracuse, which was still under the flag of the Bourbon king Francis II, she decided to take part in the new battles. Discarding her feminine attire and dressing as a man, she went to Syracuse.

Bolognara Calcagno would also wear this changed attire from then on, no longer wearing skirts or any feminine clothing, and adopting characteristically masculine behaviour. Historical accounts narrate that several times she hung out in the barracks, smoking and drinking.

When the insurrections were over and the Italian nation was formed, she was decorated with the Silver Medal of Military Valor for her participation in the revolutionary movements. She was granted a pension by the government that amounted to nine ducats a month, except that they only managed to keep it going for a maximum of two years. The following year, the municipality of Catania compensated her with an award of 216 ducats.

There are reports of her in Catania until 1876. After that, the historical sources give no more information. Some think that she returned to the Province of Messina where she was born.

== See also ==
- Agustina de Aragón
- Giuseppina Vadalà
- Mary Ludwig Hays

== Bibliography ==
- Archivio storico siciliano, Società siciliana per la storia patria, 1909
- Archivio storico per la Sicilia orientale, Volume 6, La Società, 1909
- Jole Calapso, Donne ribelli: un secolo di lotte femminili in Sicilia, S.F. Flaccovio, 1980
- Elena Doni, Donne del Risorgimento, Il mulino, 2011
- Antonietta Drago, Donne e amori del Risorgimento, A. Palazzi, 1960
- Salvatore Lo Presti, Memorie storiche di Catania: Fatti e leggende..., Cav. Niccolò Giannotta, 1961
- Michele Manfredi-Gigliotti, "'Peppa 'a Cannunera' da Barcellona Pozzo di Gotto, un'eroina siciliana del Risorgimento italiano del tutto dimenticata." Capo d'Orlando: Siciliantica, January 11, 2022
- Eugenia Roccella, Lucetta Scaraffia, Italiane, Volume 1, Dipartimento per l'informazione e l'editoria, Presidenza del Consiglio dei ministri, 2004
