= Nello Cassata Ethnohistory Museum =

- Museo etnostorico Nello Cassata
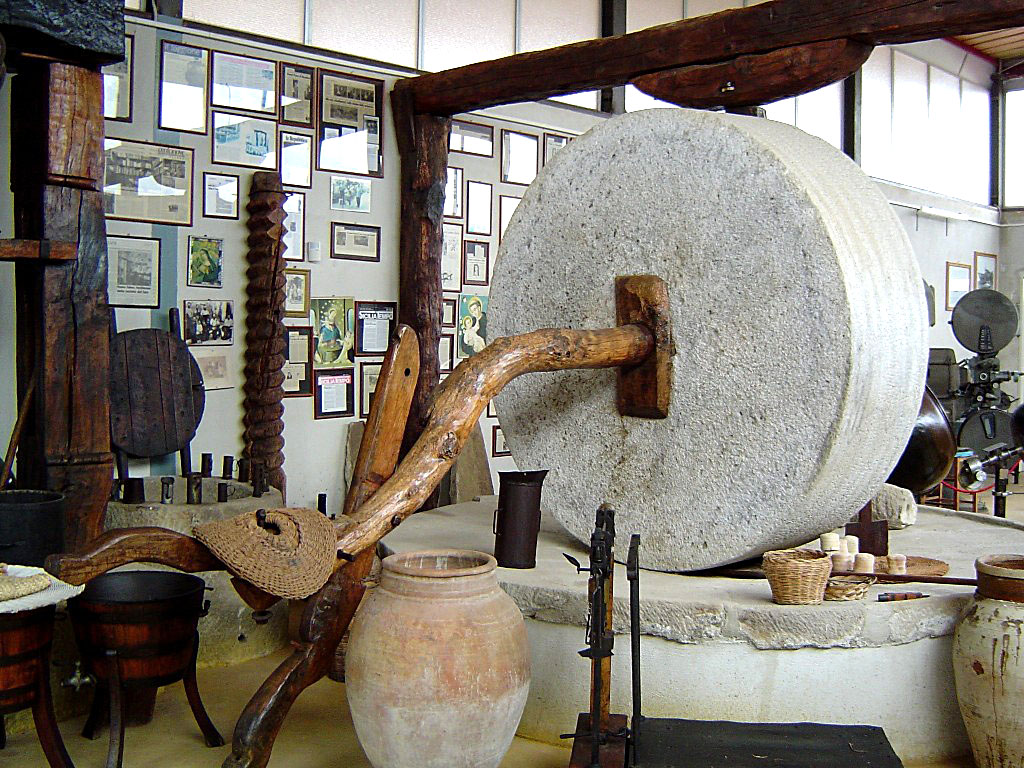
- Millstone
- Location: Contrada Manno - SS 113 - Barcellona Pozzo di Gotto
- Coordinates: 38.162655°N 15.237249°E
- Type: Ethnographic museum

The Nello Cassata Ethnohistory Museum (Italian: Museo etnostorico Nello Cassata) is a museum located in Barcellona Pozzo di Gotto, Sicily, Italy.

It stands on an area of 1,500 square meters (0.37 acres) which includes a two-floor manor house (the family's country residence) dating back to the late 19th century.

The building has an old barrel-vaulted palmento (a building for wine pressing) on the ground floor, a front door with relief decorations depicting scenes of rural life, an atrium paved in local stone, nineteenth-century lights set in the midst of a typical Sicilian garden.

The museum is run by the "Oikos" European Institute of Ethnology, a non-profit organization with about thirty employees.

== Description ==
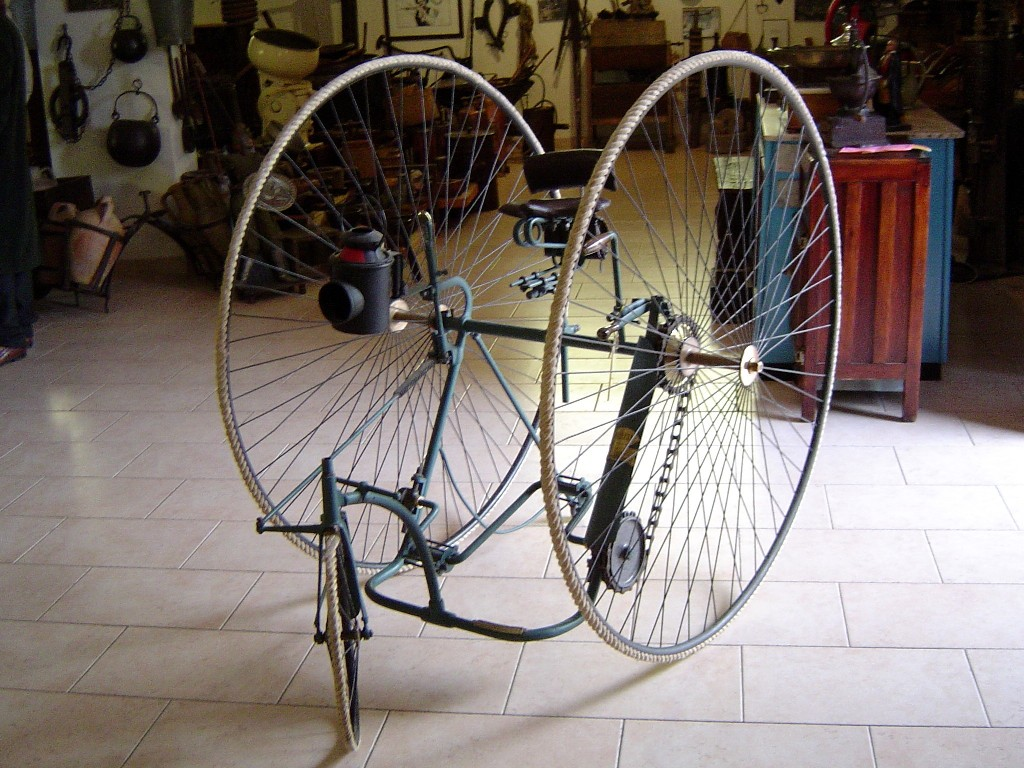
Tricycle

The museum contains about 45 arts and crafts workshops, with 20,000 finds catalogued and protected by the Superintendence of Cultural Heritage of Messina.

The exhibition includes approximately 3,000 exhibits from the collection.

The workshops reconstruct the lifecycle of handicraft using traditional methods, showing restored and working tools and instruments. The exhibition follows the ideas of the Sicilian scholar Giuseppe Pitrè, who was one of the founders of ethno-anthropological science in Italy in the 19th century.

== History ==
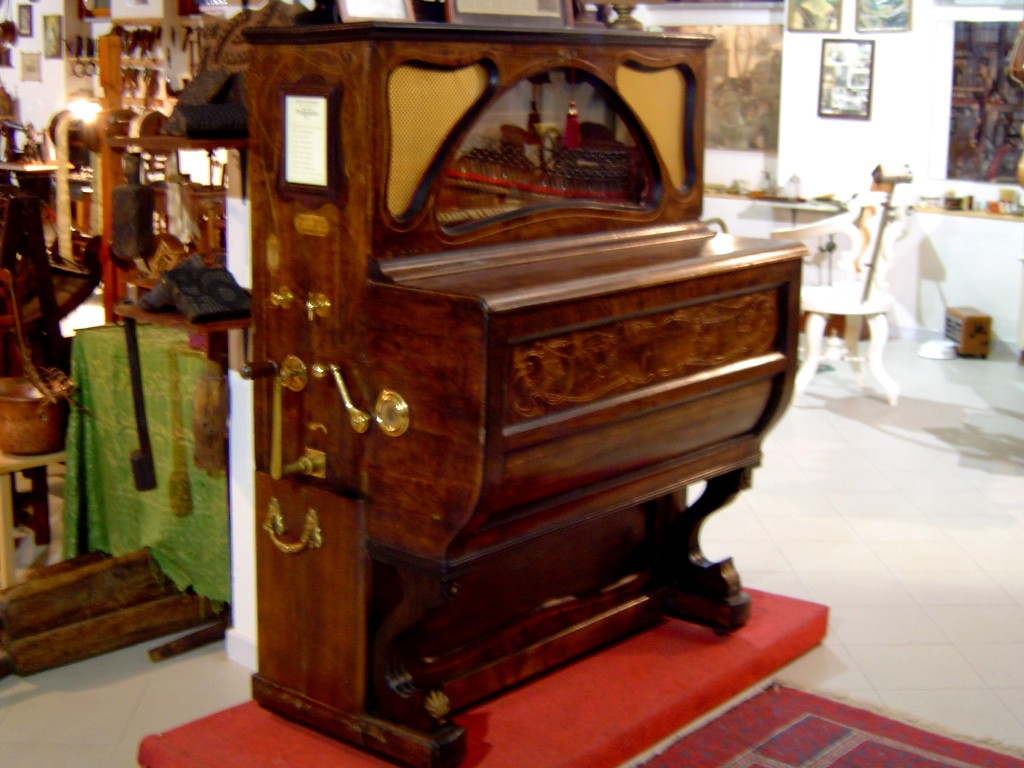
Jukebox of the beginning of 20th century

At the heart of the collection is a set of bone spoon used by shepherds while away in alpeggio (mountain pastures) and collected by the founder of the museum, Nello Cassata.

The lawyer Nello Cassata was a poet who wrote in the Sicilian dialect, a historian and lover of all things Sicilian. He began his collection in the mid-20th century, passing on his passion to his son Franco, General Counsel at the Appeal Court of Messina, who helped him collect the artefacts over the years.

In 1995, the Oikos Institute was founded to manage the museum, which has subsequently opened to the public.

It promotes various cultural events, dealing with material culture and anthropology (thematic study conventions, festivals with performances by storytellers, puppet theatre, classical and theatre in local dialect). The museum also includes a library specializing in general anthropology and the history of Sicily, a newspaper library and a video library open to the public.

The museum collaborates with local cultural institutions of the territory, offering advice for the preparation of related university theses and has published several works.

It offers free educational visits and training aiding voluntary organizations.

== Exhibits ==
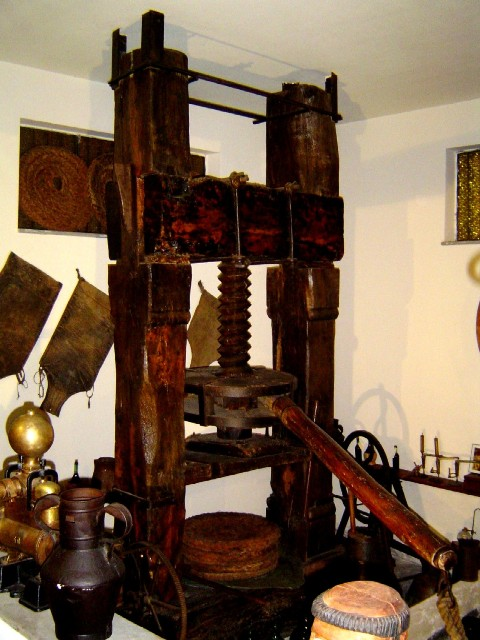
Carpet-oak vertical press

The museum is not organized into sections, but, instead, presents the Arts and Crafts as a whole. It is considered one of the most interesting and comprehensive anthropological museums in Italy in terms of type, quantity and quality of its exhibits.

Alongside the museum there is a restoration workshop where educational courses are also given, a refreshment area with a bookshop and a garden with rare Sicilian plants.

Much agricultural equipment is on display, including an old sessile oak vertical press, a thousand-year old oak wine press with horizontal structure and operation, the prototype of a tractor with a combustion engine, a collection of ancient nail ploughs and ploughshares, a sowing machine and hay baler. The wainwright's workshop (making the Sicilian cart) has been rebuilt.

Several household utensils are on display, including the first hand-operated metal washing machine, a hip-bath, some tiled spittoons, a portable bidet built into a burl walnut cupboard.

The industrial archeology finds include prototypes of typewriters, including:

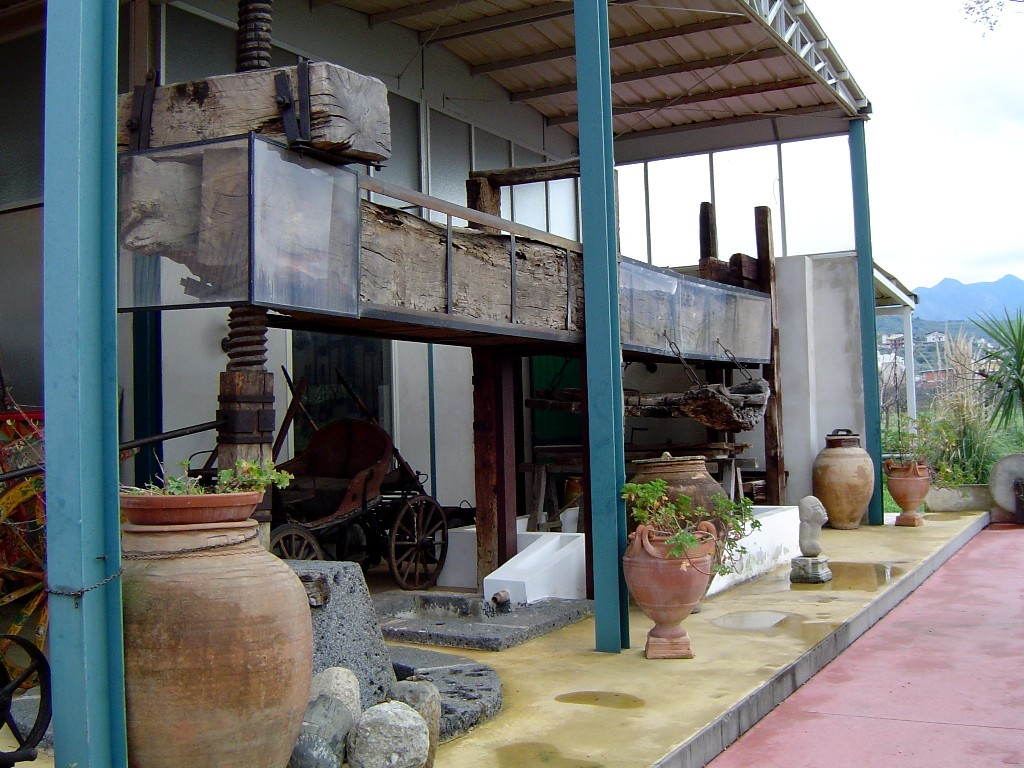
Oak wine press with horizontal structure

- a single mobile button scribe harpsichord
- a first generation "Odell 1b" linear index
- an 1880s "Blickensderfer 5" ink pad and pivoting head
- a wooden "Stansby&Wayne" with Braille system for the blind

In addition, there are several Edison wax disc musical phonographs, a prototype of a portable picnic record player from the early 20th century, Marconi's wireless telegraph, a set of cameras and one of the first enlargers dating back to 1865.

There are also several twelve digit mechanical calculators, the first portable wooden photocopier with a graphite powder slate board, a mechanical lathe with a special tool, the "ancina", used to work wax puppets.

A section of the museum houses naval instruments, including a bronze radio direction finder, large compasses and several pieces bronze furniture. The museum also displays wooden furniture showing Bodoni’s movable type models, coming from an early twentieth century printing house, 1886 Lumiere brother's magic lantern, a movie projector from the 1930s and a mid-nineteenth century tricycle with rope-covered wheels.

Another section is dedicated to war technology and includes holsters for gunpowder from Garibaldi's times, field equipment, rifles with a bayonet, halberds, the Italian flag with "Savoia emblem" and other finds from the World Wars.

A Chanson a dancer is exhibited in the museum. This is a musical machine built in the late nineteenth century by the Frenchman Folliot. It comes from Verdun and was played in the Café chantant. It comprises a mechanical spring system and a phonotactical cylinder, through which small hammers beat on the strings and the bells reproduce one of the ten pinned cylinder melodies.

The museum also contains a vintage collection of musical manuscripts and printed pages, as well as many musical instruments, including the viola d'amore, trumpets and trombones and a fine Bakelite-inlaid accordion.

== Bibliography ==
- Museo etnostorico Nello Cassata, La magia del fare-Oggetti e forme della memoria, volumi I e II, 1991-2003
- Museo etnostorico Nello Cassata, Carmina dant panem? 1995;
- Nello Cassata con disegni di Bruno Caruso, La mia preistoria, 1999.
