= Barcellona Pozzo di Gotto =

Barcellona Pozzo di Gotto Baccialona Pizzaottu (Sicilian)
- Comune
- Comune di Barcellona Pozzo di Gotto
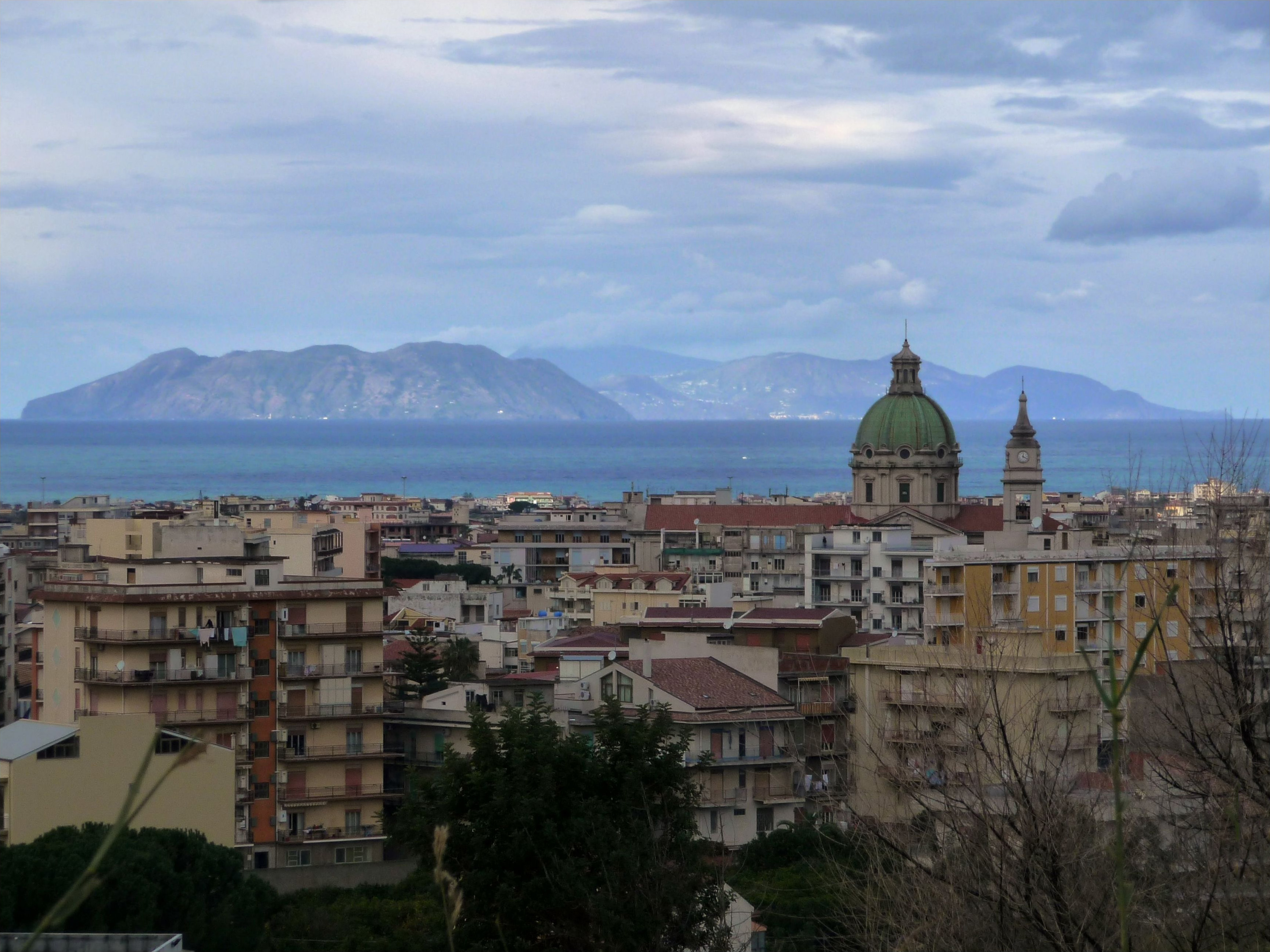

- Coat of arms

- Location within Italy Location within Sicily
- Coordinates: 38°9′N 15°13′E
- Country: Italy
- Region: Sicily
- Metropolitan city: Messina (ME)

Government
  - Mayor: Roberto Materia

Area
  - Total: 59.14 km^{2} (22.83 sq mi)
- Elevation: 60 m (200 ft)

Population (2025)
  - Total: 39,778
  - Density: 672.6/km^{2} (1,742/sq mi)
- Demonym: Barcellonesi
- Time zone: UTC+1 (CET)
  - Summer (DST): UTC+2 (CEST)
- Postal code: 98051
- Dialing code: 090
- Patron saint: St. Sebastian
- Saint day: 20 January
- Website: Official website

Barcellona Pozzo di Gotto (Italian: [bartʃelˈloːna ˈpottso di ˈɡɔtto]; Sicilian: Baccialona Pizzaottu) is a town and municipality in the Metropolitan City of Messina in the autonomous island region of Sicily in Italy, 40 kilometres (25 mi) west of Messina. As of 2025, with a population of 39,778, it is the 2nd-largest municipality in the metropolitan city.

== History ==
=== Ancient history ===
In the area corresponding to the current municipal area, the following ancient settlements were identified:

- Settlement and necropolis of the Bronze Age and Iron Age, in Maloto locality.
- Settlement and necropolis, from around the 10th century BC, in Pizzo Lando.
- Settlement and necropolis of ancient Greek or Hellenistic times, assigned to 8th century BC, in Oliveto locality.
- Settlement and necropolis of Sicani/Greek origins, dating from around the 6th and 5th centuries BC, in Sant'Onofrio locality.

In 265 BC, the Battle of Longano, between the army of Hiero II of Syracuse and the Mamertines under the command of the leader Cione, took place in this area. The exact assignment of the place in the absence of identifiable cause remains earthquakes, floods, or diversion of water courses. There are several hypotheses that place the event along the courses of the rivers bordering the "Mela" or "Patrì", and other in the vicinity of the mythical city "Longane" (Rodì Milici) or "Abacena" (Tripi), however settlements related to the same conflict.

=== Origins and etymology ===
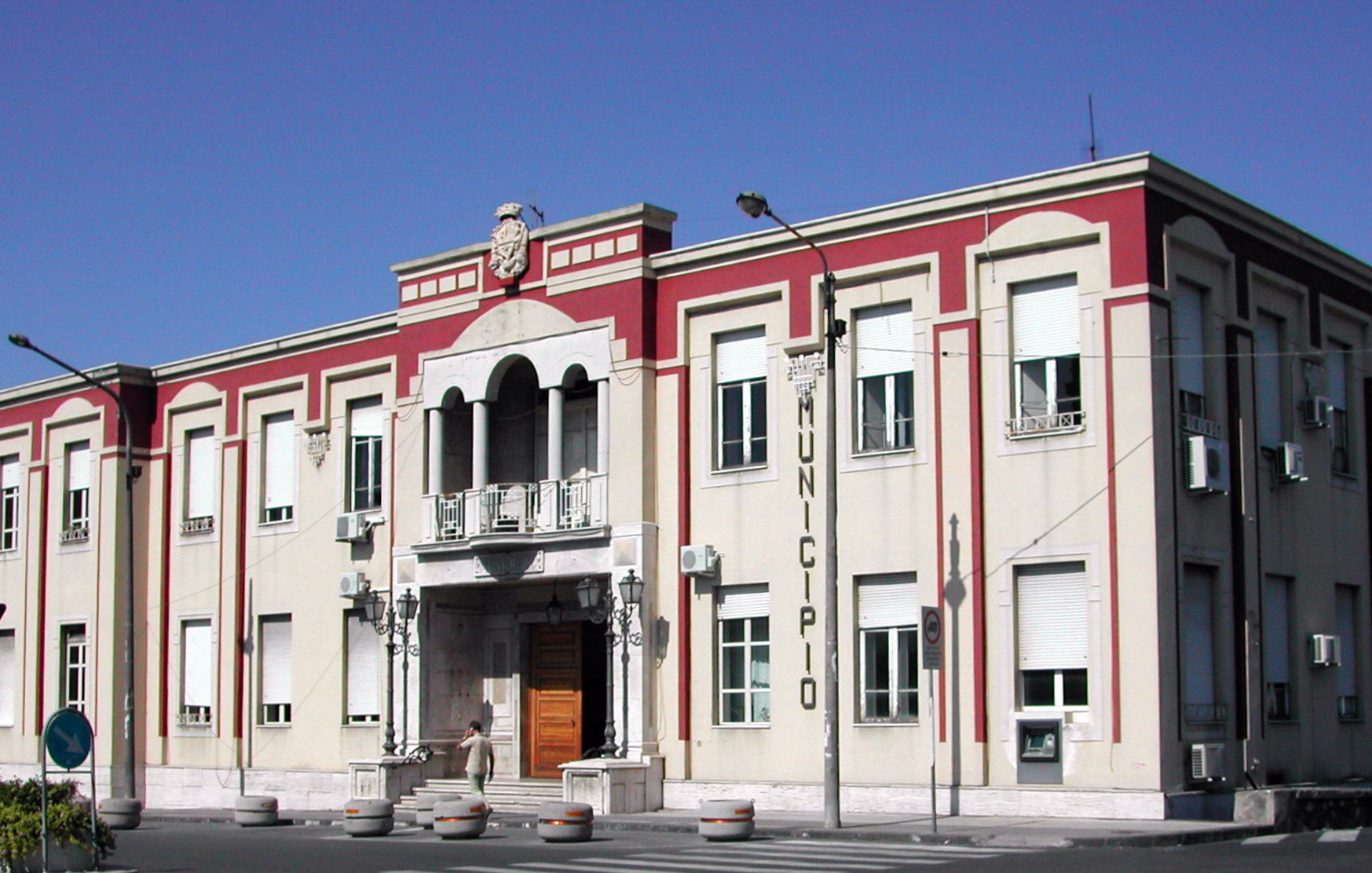
Longano Palace

Barcellona Pozzo di Gotto lies in the plain that slopes to the north close to the lush hills and the chain of Peloritani mountains, overlooking the Gulf of Patti in the Tyrrhenian Sea on the part near the Aeolian Islands in a portion of coast between the Milazzo peninsula to the east and to the west promontory of Tindari.

The most credible hypothesis for the derivation of its name is that it was derived during the era of rule by the Crown of Aragon (1282–1516). It is likely the first rulers of the town came from the County of Barcelona.

The oldest part of the town, Pozzo di Gotto, owes its name to the digging of a well for irrigation in cultivated lands located between the rivers Idria and Longano, belonging to Nicholas Goto as described in Vulgar Latin in a document dated 1463: " ... Nicolao de Gotho, ..., in quo Puzzo de Gotho ...". In 1571 Pozzogottesi obtained from the Grand Court of the Archbishop of Messina permission to elect their chaplain stationed in San Vito no longer dependant on the Archpriest of Milazzo. The Spanish Viceroy removed Pozzo di Gotto from the under the jurisdiction of Milazzo on 22 May 1639, and ratified by royal during the reign of Philip IV of Spain, and the town assumes the title "Libera et Realis Civitas Putei de Gotho". The village in the west of the river Longano in turn under the jurisdiction of Castroreale and had already followed the example of the neighboring community, rebelling against the jurors castrensian doing in the Church to recognize its independence. Notarial deeds dating back to 1522 in Castroreale report the name of the district or hamlet of "Barsalona", a name likely to be attributed to the presence in the baptismal books of Pozzo di Gotto the name of "Graziosa Barsalona", on the other hand is supported the thesis that the name of the location has been given by Iberian sailors having recognizing the remarkable similarity of the two territories.

The autonomy of the village of Barcellona was accepted by the Sicilian Parliament, recognized by the King on 15 May 1815 and ratified in Vienna 28 February 1823, by King Ferdinand I of the Two Sicilies. The administrative union decreed 5 January 1835, comes into force on 1 June 1836 at the behest of King Ferdinand II of the Two Sicilies, deciding that the new municipality formed by the merger of the two ancient districts bore the full name of Barcellona Pozzo di Gotto. Are discarded by the King all the advanced options of names derived from the word "Longano", receiving the unanimous appreciation, on the other hand the initial goodwill will turn into hatred and resentment towards the monarch as a result of criminal actions undertaken throughout the province, especially in Milazzo and Messina, which earned him the nickname of "King Bomb". The city soon established covered a certain role with significant contributions to the definitive expulsion of the House of Bourbon from the province and the whole of Sicily and increasingly effective input in all the events included in the process of unification of constituting Kingdom of Italy.

== Demographics ==
Historical population
Year	Pop.	±%
1861	20,257	—
1871	20,569	+1.5%
1881	21,101	+2.6%
1901	24,133	+14.4%
1911	26,172	+8.4%
1921	24,935	−4.7%
1931	25,808	+3.5%
1936	27,134	+5.1%
1951	30,755	+13.3%
1961	32,138	+4.5%
1971	34,469	+7.3%
1981	38,171	+10.7%
1991	40,544	+6.2%
2001	41,258	+1.8%
2011	41,632	+0.9%
2021	40,029	−3.9%
Source: ISTAT

As of 2025, Barcellona Pozzo di Gotto has a population of 39,778, of whom 49.0% are male and 51.0% are female. Minors make up 16.3% of the population, and seniors make up 22.9%, compared to the Italian average of 14.9% and 24.7% respectively.

=== Foreign population ===
As of 2024, the foreign-born population is 3,515, equal to 8.8% of the population. The 5 largest foreign nationalities are Albanians (565), Moroccans (511), Romanians (368), Swiss (320) and Argentinians (214).

== Traditions and folklore ==
The procession of Varette which takes place on Good Friday, and at the same time two processions consist of twenty-six Vare depicting the mysteries of the Passion parade through the streets of the city.

Foreign population by country of birth (2024)
Country of birth	Population
Albania	565
Morocco	511
Romania	368
Switzerland	320
Argentina	214
Tunisia	193
India	131
Germany	126
Nigeria	106
Poland	103
Bangladesh	98
China	73
Ukraine	66
Egypt	53
Senegal	41

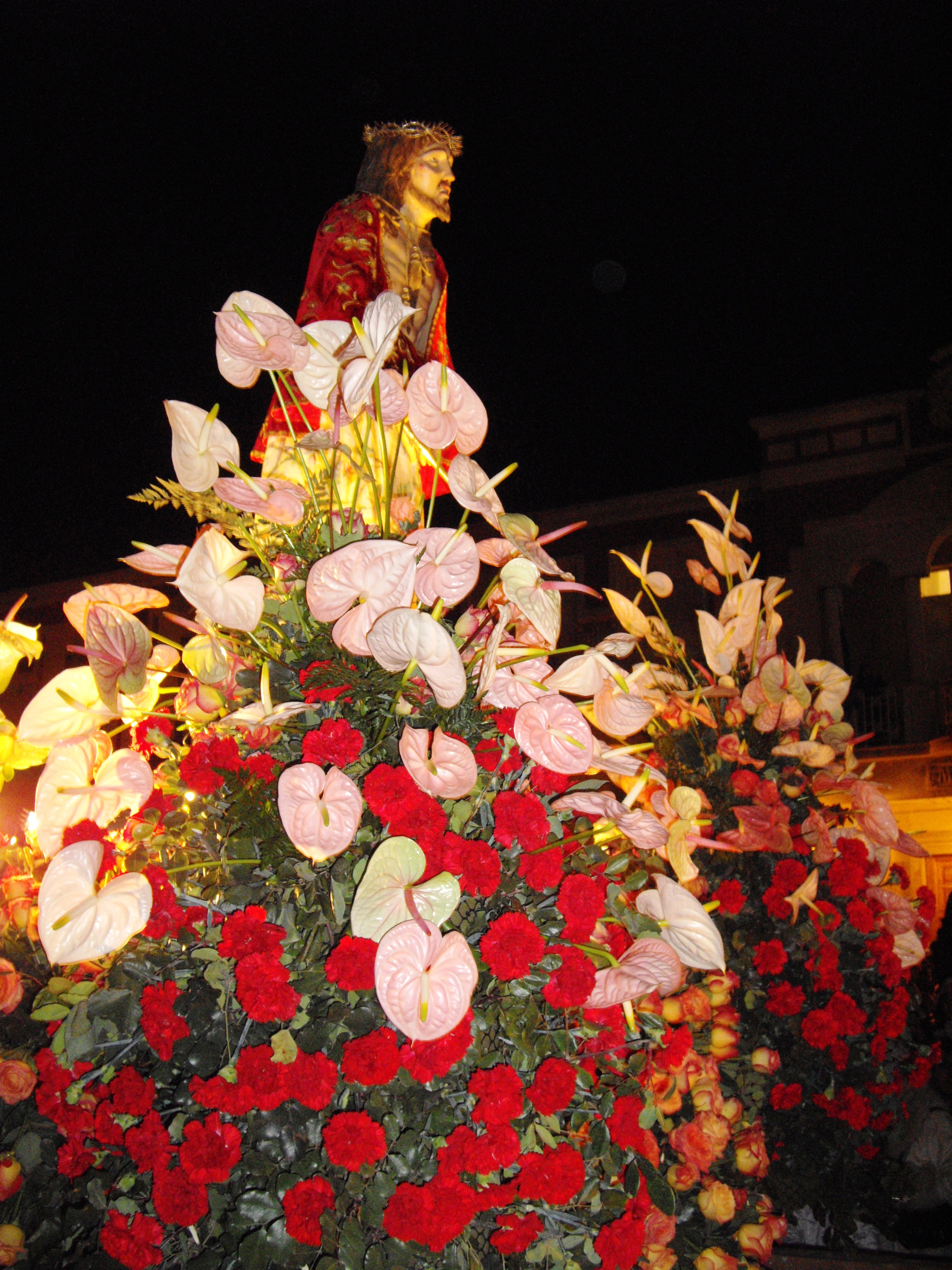
ECCE HOMO of Barcellona

== Main sights ==
The thirteenth-century village of Castroreale, home to a tower from a medieval castle built by King Frederick II of Aragon, is located nearby.

The Nello Cassata Ethnohistory Museum is based here.

=== Religious architecture ===
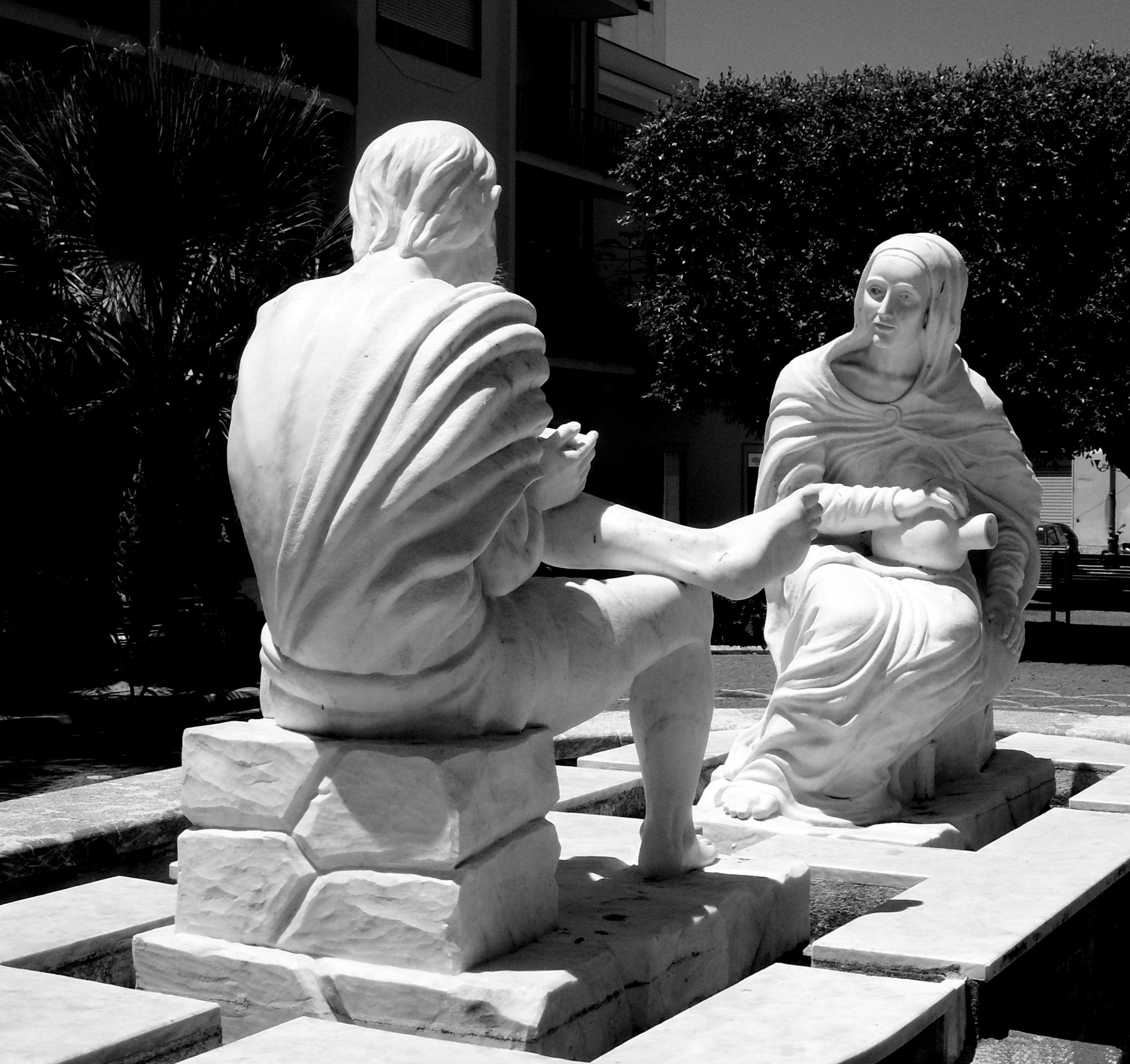
Francesco De Francesco Longano e Idria (1998)

- Cave of Saint Venera, fiefdom of the Basilians, rock temple with a square plan and octagonal dome. Armenian - Byzantine origin from the 7th – 8th century.

==== Churches ====
These are some of the most important churches in Barcellona Pozzo di Gotto:

- 1936, Minor basilica of Saint Sebastian.
- 1579 - 1583, Church of Carmine and convent of the Carmelite Order.
- 1620 - 1646, Church of the Assumption, totally rebuilt in the 19th century.
- 1623, Church of Jesus and Mary.
- 1954, Church of Saint Francis of Paola. Reconstruction of a primitive place of worship from the 18th century.
- 1622, Church of Saint Anthony of Padua and convent of the Order of the Franciscan Friars Minor, founded in the neighborhood of the same name.
- 1635, Church of Saint John the Baptist, founded in the neighborhood of the same name, expanded in 1751 - 1754.
- 1663, Church of the Holy Crucifix. It was the seat of a brotherhood of the same name.
- 1623, Church of Saint Francis of Assisi under the title of the "Immaculate Conception" or simply "Church of the Capuchins".
- 17th century, Church of Saint Andrew the Apostle.
- 1637, Church of Saint Anthony the Abbot. Restored c. 1930 and c. 1960
- 1776 - 1791, Church of Saint Mary of Tindari and monastery of the Basilian order. It replaces the old seat of the Basilians near Gala, re-founded in 1105 by Countess Adelaide, wife of the Grand Count Roger, dedicated to the "Madonna Galaktotrophousa" or "Madonna breastfeeding the Child" or Panaghia Galaktotrophousa.
- 1750, Church of the Immaculate Conception.
- 18th century, Church of Saint Rosalia.
- 1472 - 1571, Church of Saint Vitus.
- 1472 - 1663, Oratory of Purgative Souls, near Saint Vitus church.
- 1955 - 1959, Church of Saint Mary of Visitazion, Centineo.
- 1300 - 1310, Church of Saint Roch, Nasari.
- Church of Saint Mary of Pillar, Acquaficara.
- 2004, Church of Saints Andrew and Vitus.

== Sport ==
Igea Virtus is the local football team, usually playing in Serie D.

== Notable people ==
- Giuseppa Bolognara Calcagno (1846–1884), freedom fighter of the Risorgimento
- Emilio Fede (born 1931), journalist
- Carmelo Freni (born 1934) journalist, writer, director
- Emilio Isgrò (born 1937), artist
- Leonardo Vitale (1941–1984), Mafia pentito
- Giuseppe (Beppe) Aldo Felice Alfano (1945-1993), journalist
- Francesca Chillemi (born 1985), Miss Italia 2003

== See also ==
- Duomo of Barcellona Pozzo di Gotto
- History of Roman Catholicism in Italy
