= Castroreale =

- Comune
- Comune di Castroreale
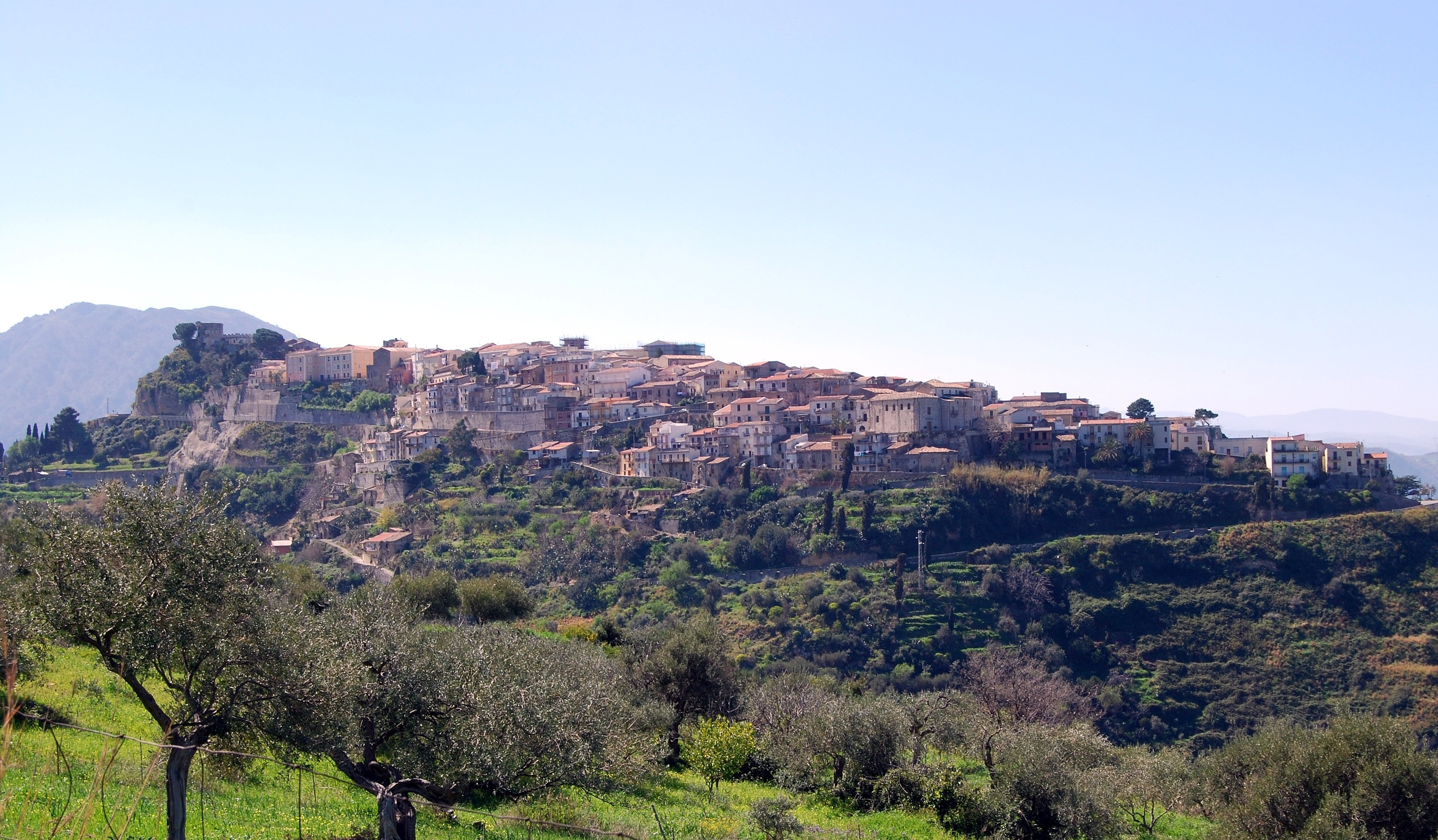

- Coat of arms

- Location within Italy Location within Sicily
- Coordinates: 38°6′N 15°13′E
- Country: Italy
- Region: Sicily
- Metropolitan city: Messina (ME)
- Frazioni: Bafia, Protonotaro

Government
  - Mayor: Giuseppe Mandanici

Area
  - Total: 54 km^{2} (21 sq mi)
- Elevation: 394 m (1,293 ft)

Population (30 November 2011)
  - Total: 2,645
  - Density: 49/km^{2} (130/sq mi)
- Demonym: Castrensi
- Time zone: UTC+1 (CET)
  - Summer (DST): UTC+2 (CEST)
- Postal code: 98053
- Dialing code: 090
- Patron saint: St. Sylvester
- Saint day: 31 December
- Website: Official website

Castroreale (Sicilian: Castruriali) is a village in the Metropolitan City of Messina, Sicily, southern Italy. It is one of I Borghi più belli d'Italia ("The most beautiful villages of Italy").

It has around 2,702 inhabitants but over 80 churches, with some houses dating to the 13th century. It is 8.5 kilometres (5.3 mi) from Barcellona Pozzo di Gotto and 30 kilometres (19 mi) from Messina.

It has a tower, last remain of a castle, built by Frederick II of Aragon in 1324. The name Castroreale comes from Latin, and means "royal fortress".

== People ==
- Antonino Borzì
- Giuseppina Vadalà
- Pina Menichelli (1890–1984)
