= Emilio Isgrò =

Italian artist and writer (born 1937)

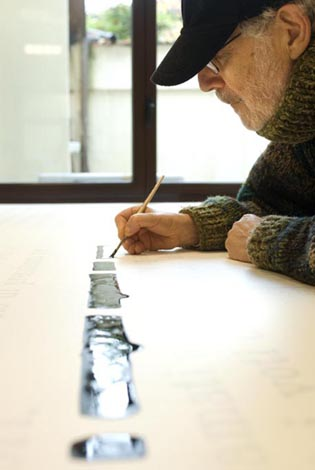
Isgrò in 2011

Emilio Isgrò (born 6 October 1937) is an Italian artist and writer, known for his use of the erasure technique in his art works.

== Biography ==
Isgrò was born on 6 October 1937 in Barcellona Pozzo di Gotto, Sicily, but he moved to Milan when he was 19. He made his literary debut in 1956 with the poetry collection Fiere del Sud (Arturo Schwarz Editore). In 1964 he first began erasing encyclopaedias and other texts, making his personal contribution to the birth and development of visual poetry and conceptual art. In 1966, during a one-man show at the Galleria Traghetto in Venice, he published Dichiarazione 1, defining his conception of poetry as "general art of the sign". He published the volume of poems L'età della ginnastica (Mondadori). In 1976 the first retrospective of his work was held at the Centro Studi e Archivio della Comunicazione (CSAC) in Parma.

In 1977, Isgrò took part in the Venice Biennale, returning there in 1978, 1986 and 1993. He was one of a group of artists featured in the exhibition Contemporanea (1973), curated by Achille Bonito Oliva in the underground car park of the Villa Borghese in Rome. The following year, he published L'avventurosa: Vita di Emilio Isgrò nelle testimonianze di uomini di stato, scrittori, artisti, parlamentari, attori, parenti, familiari, amici, anonimi cittadini (Il Formichiere), which was nominated for the Strega Prize. Also in 1977, he was awarded the first prize at the XIVth Bienal de São Paulo in Brazil. That same year he also published the novel Marta de Rogatiis Johnson (Feltrinelli). In 1979, he presented Chopin, an installation and musical score for 15 pianos, at the Rotonda della Besana in Milan.

In 1982, his Gibella del Martirio and San Rocco legge la lista dei miracoli e degli orrori were performed in Gibellina. From the following year and for three consecutive seasons, his Sicilian trilogy Orestea di Gibellina was also performed in Gibellina at the Festival Internazionale delle Orestiadi. In 1985, the Teatro alla Scala commissioned him to create the multimedia installation La veglia di Bach in the San Carpoforo Church in Milan. In 1986, he presented the installation L'ora italiana at the Civic Archaeological Museum in Bologna, commemorating the victims of the terrorist bomb attack at the city's railway station on 2 August 1980. In 1989, he published the novel Polifemo (Mondadori), at the same time working out a new theory of erasure in Teoria della cancellatura (Galleria Fonte d'Abisso).

Isgrò's work was featured in the exhibition The Artist and the Book in Twentieth-Century Italy held at the Museum of Modern Art (MoMA) in New York in 1992 and in 1994 at the Peggy Guggenheim Collection in Venice. In 1994, he also published the novel L'asta delle ceneri (Camunia) and returned to poetry with the collection Oratorio dei ladri (Mondadori). In 1998, he donated his sculpture Orange Seed to his Sicilian birthplace, the town of Barcellona Pozzo di Gotto. In 2001, he held a major retrospective of his work, Emilio Isgrò 1964-2000, at the unfinished church of Santa Maria dello Spasimo in Palermo. With Le api della Torah, he also began a cycle of work featuring insects. In 2002 he published another book of poetry, Brindisi all'amico infame (Aragno), which was shortlisted for the Strega Prize and won the San Pellegrino Prize for poetry awarded by the Italian town of San Pellegrino Terme. In 2007, he collected essays and writings previously published in various newspapers and magazines in a critical and theoretical companion to his creative output entitled La cancellatura e altre soluzioni (Skira). The following year, another retrospective of his work, Dichiaro di essere Emilio Isgrò, was held at the Centro per l'arte contemporanea Luigi Pecci in Prato.

In May 2011, Isgrò presented the installation L'Italia che dorme at the Galleria d'Arte Moderna in Rome, as part of the celebrations for the 150th anniversary of the unification of Italy, this artwork was conceived the year before for the exhibition La Costituzione cancellata – Rappresentazione di un crimine, curated by Marco Bazzini at the art gallery Boxart in Verona. In 2012, in Milan at Palazzo Reale, the artworks Dichiaro di non essere Emilio Isgrò (1971) and L'avventurosa vita di Emilio Isgrò nelle testimonianze di uomini di stato, artisti, scrittori, parlamentari, attori, parenti, familiari, amici, anonimi cittadini (1972) are exhibited once again; as well as L'ora italiana (1985-1986) at Gallerie d'Italia. In June 2013, he had another retrospective, entitled Modello Italia (2013-1964), at the Galleria d'Arte Moderna in Rome, curated by Angelinandreina Rorro. The same year, the collection of essays "Come difendersi dall'arte e dalla pioggia" curated by Beatrice Benedetti was published by Maretti Editore. In 2014, his self-portrait Dichiaro di non essere Emilio Isgrò became part of the collection of Galleria degli Uffizi.

In 2015, Isgrò created the Seme dell'Altissimo, a marble sculpture 7 metres in height for Milan Expo. The next year in Milan a special project is created in his honor in three different venues: a solo show at Palazzo Reale, an exhibition of his Alessandro Manzoni's portrait erasure at Gallerie d'Italia, 35 volumes of Promessi Sposi erased for 25 readers and ten people affected by plague at Manzoni's house. In 2017 the Galleria Tornabuoni exhibits a retrospective dedicated to Emilio Isgrò in London, started in Milan and then moved to Paris, the show opened with the erasure of 24 volumes of Encyclopedia Britannica (1969). The exhibition catalogue is curated by Marco Bazzini for Forma Edizioni. In 2018 Isgrò inaugurated the artwork "Monumento all'Inferno", specially created for the IULM University of Milan. During April his art has been exhibited in Belgium at MDZ Art Gallery in a double solo show with Christo.

== Literary works ==
=== Collections of theoretical and critical writings ===
• Emilio Isgrò. L'Oro della Mirandola: Cancellature per Giovanni Pico (edited by Giulio Busi e Silvana Greco), Fondazione Palazzo Bondoni Pastorio, 2014. • Cancellatura e altre soluzioni (edited by Alberto Fiz), Skira, 2007. • Come difendersi dall’arte e dalla pioggia (edited by Beatrice Benedetti), Maretti Editore, 2013.

=== Plays ===
• L'Orestea di Gibellina e gli altri testi per il teatro (edited by Martina Treu), Le Lettere, 2011.

=== Poetry ===
• Fiere del Sud, Schwarz, Milan, 1956. • L'anteguerra, Einaudi, Turin, 1963. • Uomini & Donne, Sampietro, Bologna, 1965. • L’età della ginnastica, Mondadori, Milan, 1966. • Preghiera ecumenica per la salvezza dell’arte e della cultura, Archivio di Nuova Scrittura, 1993. • Oratorio dei ladri, Mondadori, Milan, 1996. • Brindisi all’amico infame, Nino Aragno Editore, Turin, 2003.

=== Novels ===
• L'avventurosa vita di Emilio Isgrò nelle testimonianze di uomini di stato, scrittori, artisti, parlamentari, attori, parenti, familiari, amici, anonimi cittadini, Il Formichiere, Milan, 1974. • Marta de Rogatiis Johnson, Feltrinelli, Milan, 1977. • Polifemo, Mondadori, Milan, 1989. • L’asta delle ceneri, Camunia, Milan, 1994.

=== Film ===
• La jena più ne ha e più ne vuole, project, screenplay and screen tests for a cancelled film, 1970.
