= Cione =

Cione is a surname. Notable people with the surname include:

- Jacopo di Cione (1325–1390), Italian painter
- Jean Cione [Cy] (1928–2010), pitcher who played from 1945 through 1954 in the All-American Girls Professional Baseball League
- Matteo di Cione (1330–1380), Italian sculptor, brother of three painters of Gothic Florence, Nardo di Cione, Jacopo di Cione and Andrea di Cione
- Nardo di Cione, (active 1343 – c. 1365), Italian painter, sculptor and architect from Florence
