= Limina =

Limina Limmina
- Comune
- Comune di Limina
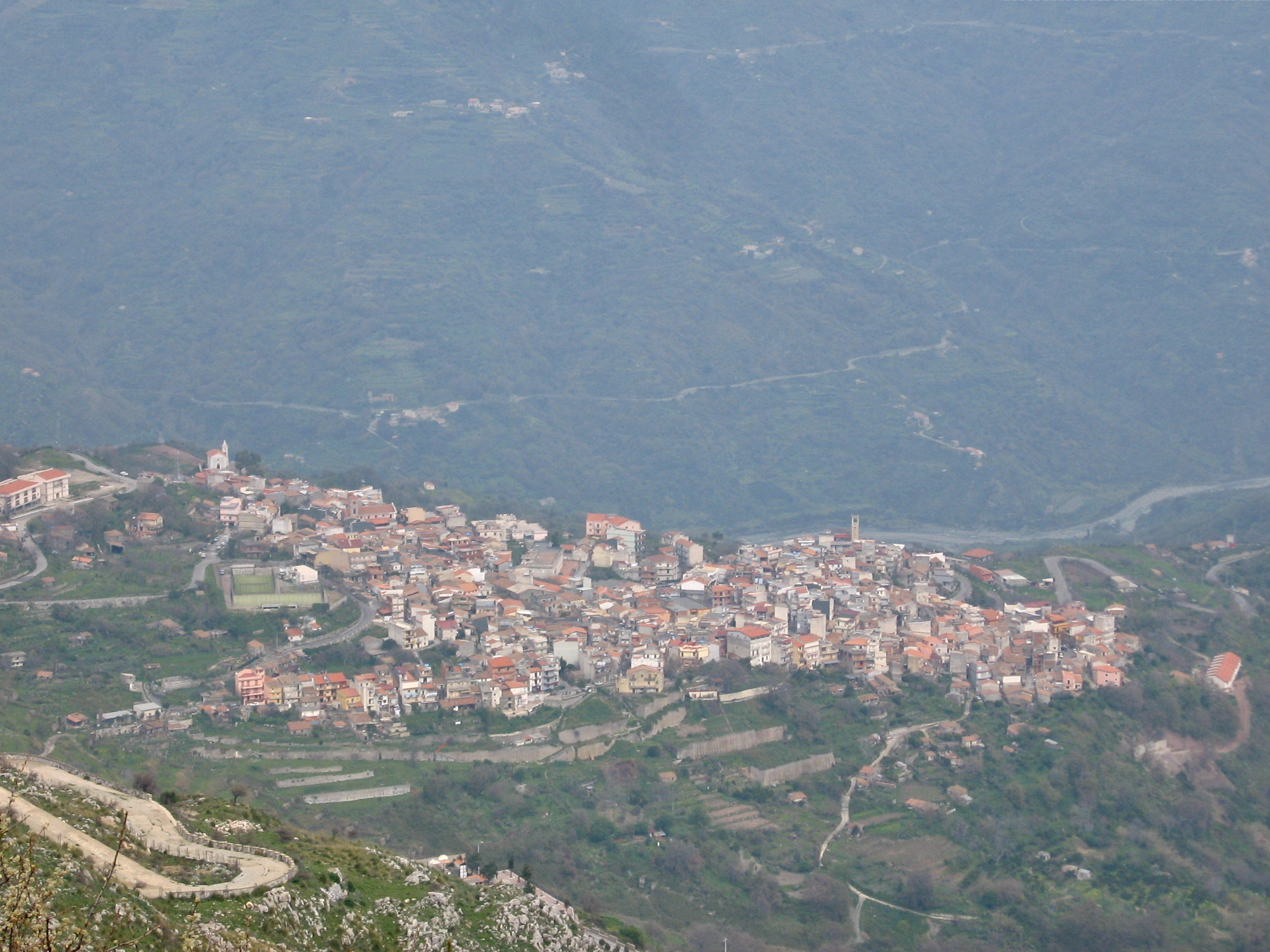

- Location within Italy Location within Sicily
- Coordinates: 37°57′N 15°16′E
- Country: Italy
- Region: Sicily
- Metropolitan city: Messina (ME)

Government
  - Mayor: Marcello Bartolotta

Area
  - Total: 9.8 km^{2} (3.8 sq mi)
- Elevation: 510 m (1,670 ft)

Population (30 November 2011)
  - Total: 916
  - Density: 93/km^{2} (240/sq mi)
- Demonym: Liminesi
- Time zone: UTC+1 (CET)
  - Summer (DST): UTC+2 (CEST)
- Postal code: 98030
- Dialing code: 0942
- Patron saint: St. Sebastian
- Website: Official website

Limina (Sicilian: Lìmmina) is a comune (municipality) in the Metropolitan City of Messina in the Italian region Sicily, located about 170 kilometres (110 mi) east of Palermo and about 35 kilometres (22 mi) southwest of Messina in the Peloritani mountains.

Limina borders the following municipalities: Antillo, Casalvecchio Siculo, Forza d'Agrò, Mongiuffi Melia, Roccafiorita.

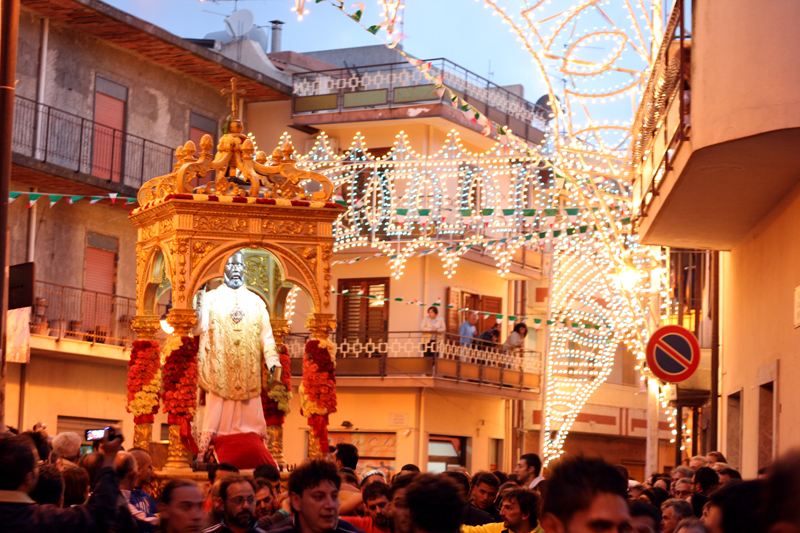
the feast of saint Philip of Agira, 11-12 and 19 of may
