= Antillo =

- Comune
- Comune di Antillo
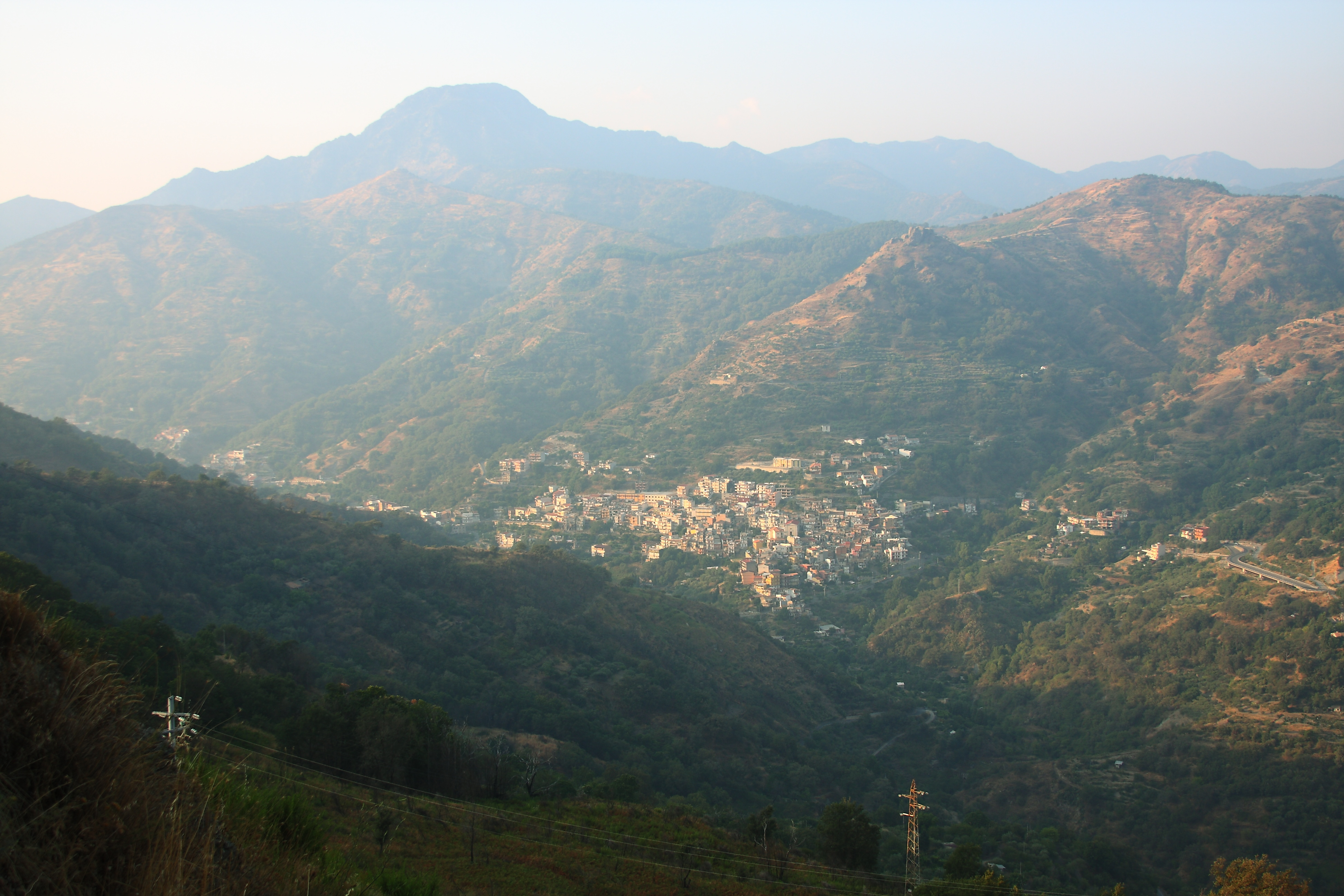

- Location of Antillo in Italy Antillo (Sicily)
- Coordinates: 37°59′N 15°15′E
- Country: Italy
- Region: Sicily
- Metropolitan city: Messina (ME)

Area
  - Total: 43.4 km^{2} (16.8 sq mi)
- Elevation: 480 m (1,570 ft)

Population (28 February 2014)
  - Total: 937
  - Density: 21.6/km^{2} (55.9/sq mi)
- Demonym: Antillesi
- Time zone: UTC+1 (CET)
  - Summer (DST): UTC+2 (CEST)
- Postal code: 98030
- Dialing code: 0942
- Website: Official website

Antillo (Sicilian: Antiddu) is a comune (municipality) in the Metropolitan City of Messina in the Italian region Sicily, located about 170 kilometres (110 mi) east of Palermo and about 35 kilometres (22 mi) southwest of Messina.

Antillo borders the following municipalities: Casalvecchio Siculo, Castroreale, Fondachelli-Fantina, Francavilla di Sicilia, Graniti, Limina, Mongiuffi Melia, Motta Camastra, Roccafiorita, Rodì Milici.
