= Gallodoro =

Gallodoro Kallípolis (Greek)
- Comune
- Comune di Gallodoro
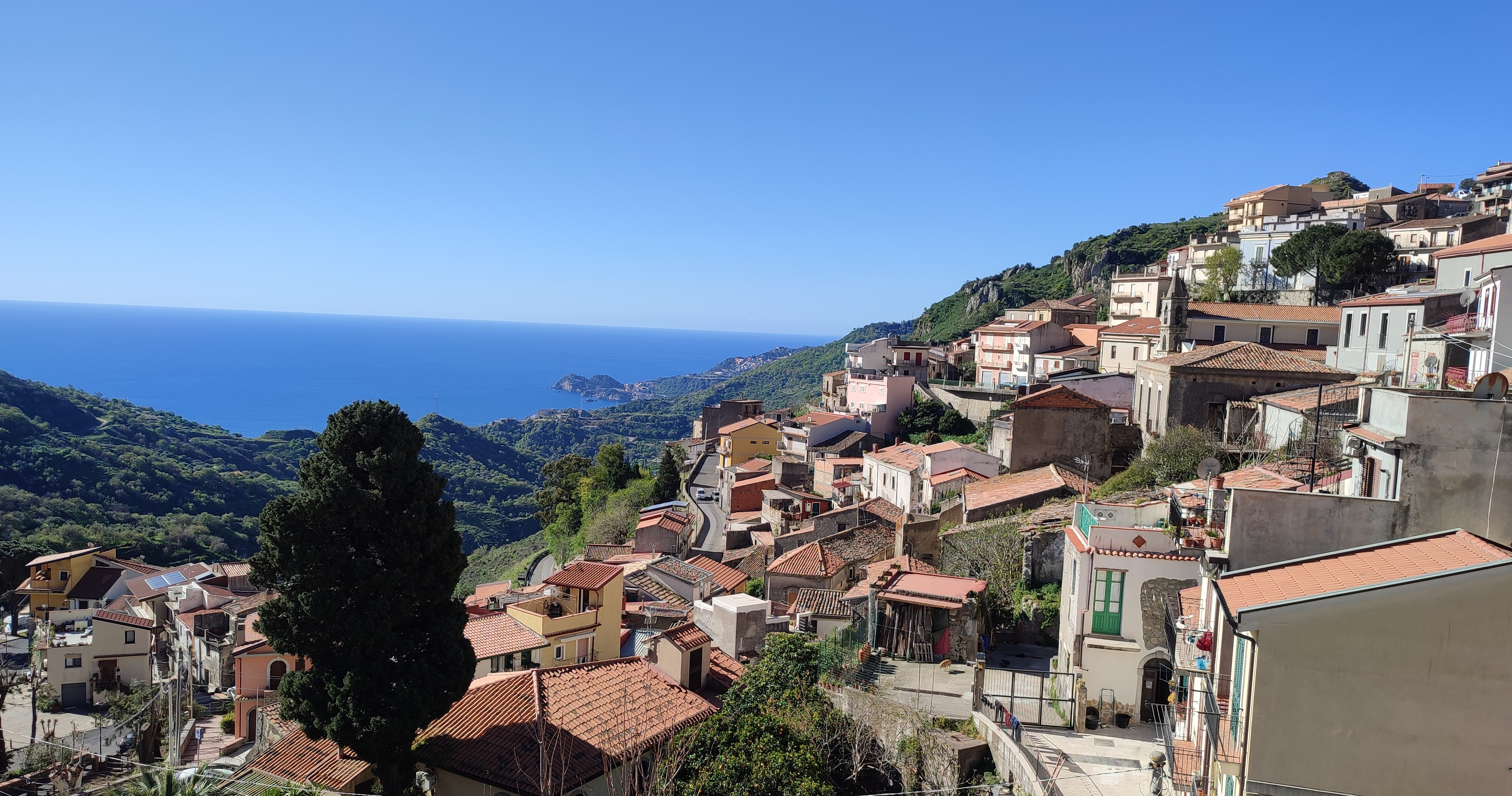
- Gallodoro in April 2022

- Location within Italy Location within Sicily
- Coordinates: 37°54′N 15°18′E
- Country: Italy
- Region: Sicily
- Metropolitan city: Messina (ME)

Government
  - Mayor: Filippo Alfio Currenti

Area
  - Total: 6.9 km^{2} (2.7 sq mi)
- Elevation: 388 m (1,273 ft)

Population (2018-01-01)
  - Total: 336
  - Density: 49/km^{2} (130/sq mi)
- Time zone: UTC+1 (CET)
  - Summer (DST): UTC+2 (CEST)
- Postal code: 98030
- Dialing code: 0942
- Website: https://www.comune.gallodoro.me.it/

Gallodoro (Sicilian: Jaddudoru) is a comune (municipality) in the Province of Messina in Sicily, Italy located about 170 kilometres (110 mi) east of Palermo and about 40 kilometres (25 mi) southwest of Messina. As of 31 December 2004, it had a population of 402 and an area of 6.9 square kilometres (2.7 mi^{2}).

Gallodoro borders the following municipalities: Forza d'Agrò, Letojanni, Mongiuffi Melia.

== Demographic evolution ==
Historical population

Year	Pop.	±%
1861	639	—
1871	697	+9.1%
1881	768	+10.2%
1901	864	+12.5%
1911	900	+4.2%

Year	Pop.	±%
1921	879	−2.3%
1931	782	−11.0%
1936	766	−2.0%
1951	696	−9.1%
1961	636	−8.6%

Year	Pop.	±%
1971	597	−6.1%
1981	486	−18.6%
1991	474	−2.5%
2001	409	−13.7%

Source: Data from ISTAT
