= Gaggi, Sicily =

Gaggi
- Comune
- Comune di Gaggi
- Location within Italy Location within Sicily
- Coordinates: 37°52′N 15°13′E
- Country: Italy
- Region: Sicily
- Metropolitan city: Messina (ME)
- Frazioni: Cavallaro, Palmara, Falcò, Costa arancione, Billirè

Area
  - Total: 7.3 km^{2} (2.8 sq mi)

Population (Dec. 2004)
  - Total: 2,812
  - Density: 390/km^{2} (1,000/sq mi)
- Demonym(s): Kaggitani (Sicilian), gaggesi (Italian)
- Time zone: UTC+1 (CET)
  - Summer (DST): UTC+2 (CEST)
- Postal code: 98030
- Dialing code: 0942

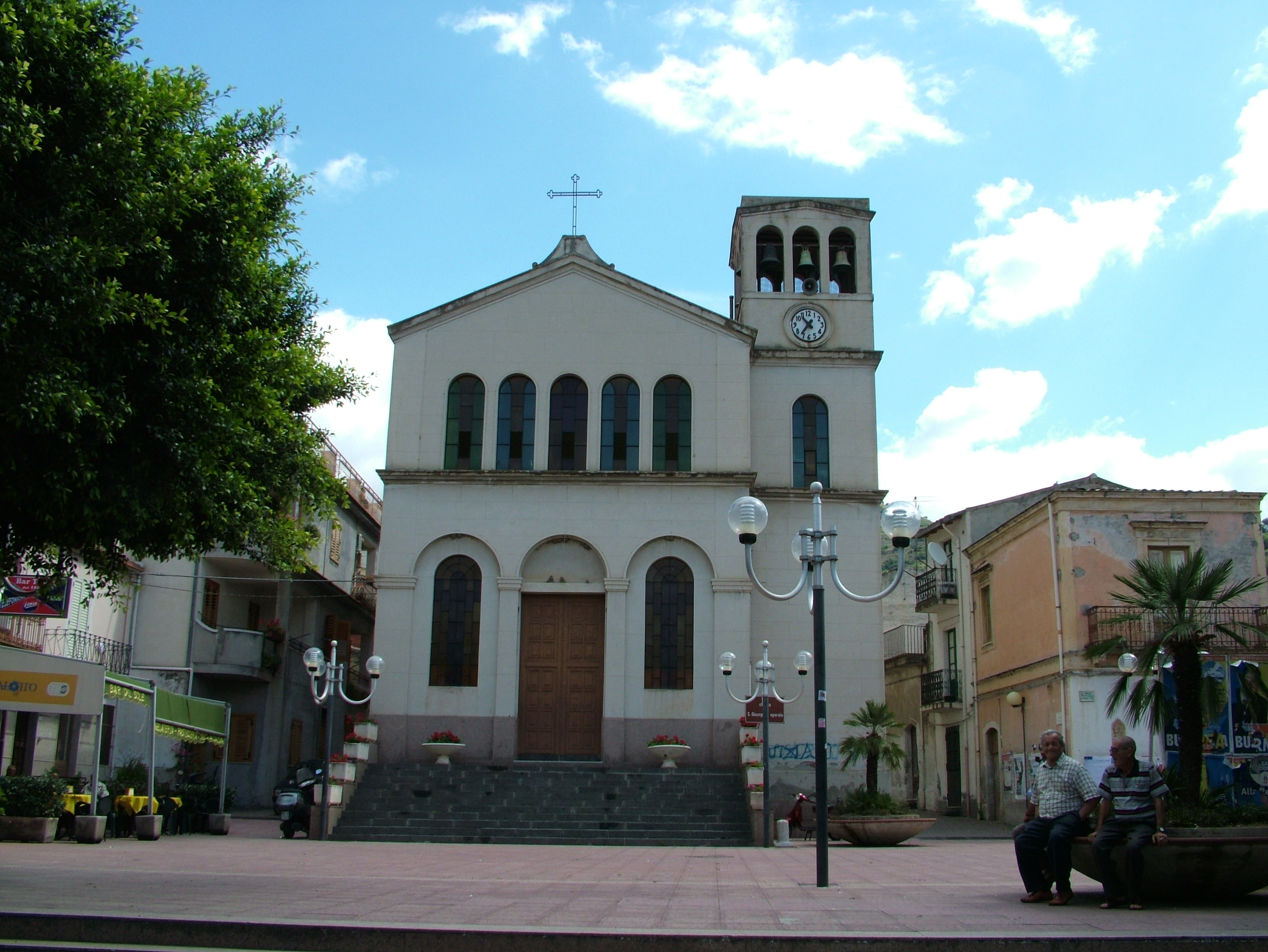
Gaggi, Province of Messina, Sicily - Church of San Giuseppe

Gaggi (Sicilian: Kaggi) is a comune (municipality) in the Metropolitan City of Messina in the Italian region of Sicily, located about 160 kilometres (99 mi) east of Palermo and about 45 kilometres (28 mi) southwest of Messina. As of 31 December 2004, it had a population of 2,812 and an area of 7.3 square kilometres (2.8 mi^{2}).

The municipality of Gaggi contains the frazioni (subdivisions, mainly villages and hamlets) Cavallaro, Palmara, Falcò, Costa arancione, and Billirè. Gaggi borders the following municipalities: Castelmola, Castiglione di Sicilia, Graniti, Mongiuffi Melia, Taormina.

== Demographic evolution ==
Historical population

Year	Pop.	±%
1861	545	—
1871	686	+25.9%
1881	690	+0.6%
1901	973	+41.0%
1911	1,215	+24.9%

Year	Pop.	±%
1921	1,666	+37.1%
1931	1,457	−12.5%
1936	1,379	−5.4%
1951	1,370	−0.7%
1961	1,432	+4.5%

Year	Pop.	±%
1971	1,534	+7.1%
1981	1,900	+23.9%
1991	2,384	+25.5%
2001	2,693	+13.0%

Source: Data from ISTAT
