= Graniti =

- Comune
- Comune di Graniti
- Location within Italy Location within Sicily
- Coordinates: 37°53′N 15°13′E
- Country: Italy
- Region: Sicily
- Metropolitan city: Messina (ME)

Area
  - Total: 10.0 km^{2} (3.9 sq mi)
- Elevation: 350 m (1,150 ft)

Population (Dec. 2004)
  - Total: 1,550
  - Density: 155/km^{2} (401/sq mi)
- Time zone: UTC+1 (CET)
  - Summer (DST): UTC+2 (CEST)
- Postal code: 98036
- Dialing code: 0942

Graniti is a comune (municipality) in the Province of Messina in the Italian region Sicily, located about 160 kilometres (99 mi) east of Palermo and about 45 kilometres (28 mi) southwest of Messina. As of 31 December 2004, it had a population of 1,550 and an area of 10.0 square kilometres (3.9 mi^{2}).

Graniti borders the following municipalities: Antillo, Castiglione di Sicilia, Gaggi, Mongiuffi Melia, Motta Camastra.

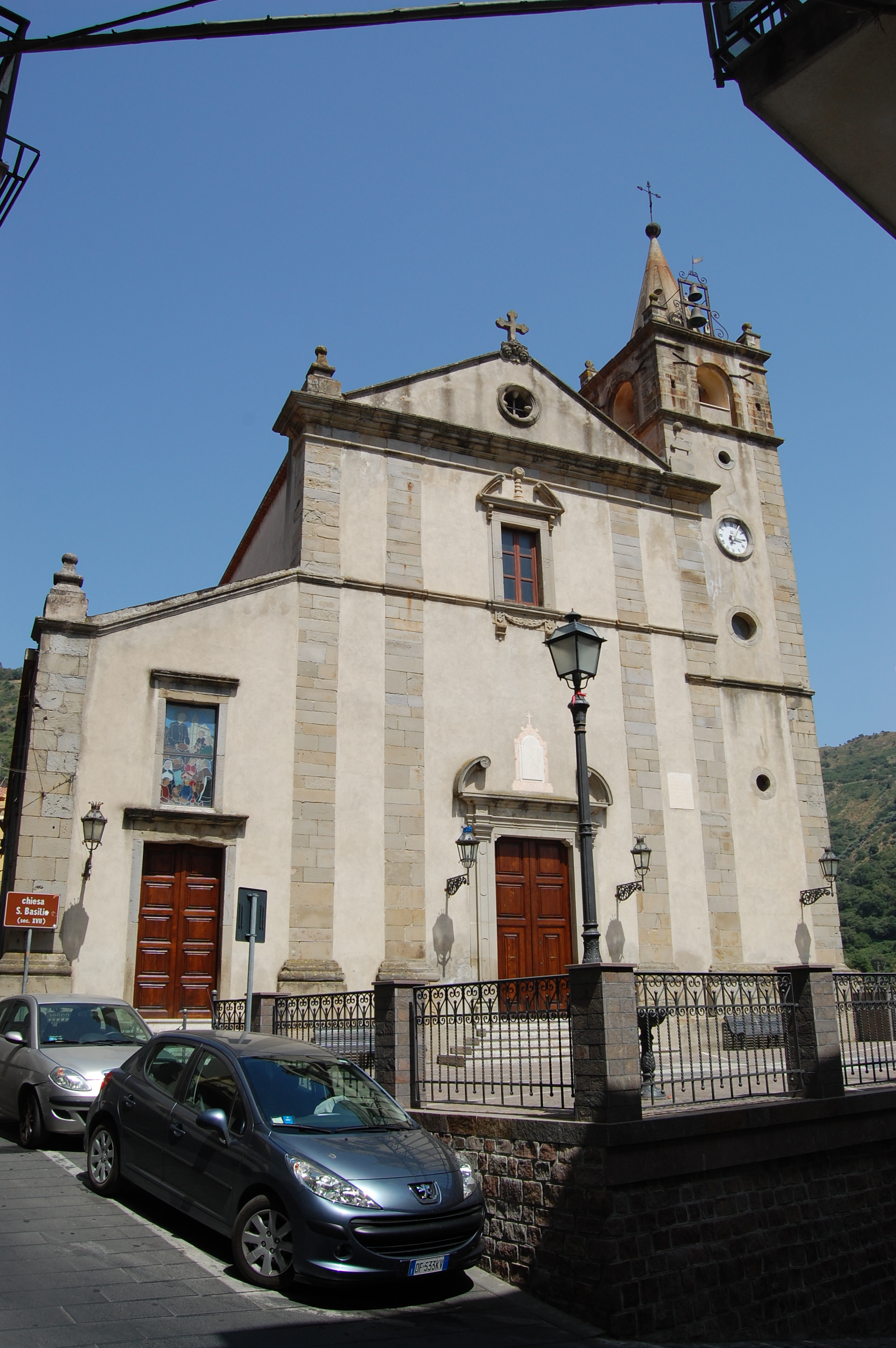
Chiesa di San Basilio Magno

== Demographic evolution ==
Historical population

| Year | Pop. | ±% |
|---|---|---|
| 1861 | 1,847 | — |
| 1871 | 1,974 | +6.9% |
| 1881 | 2,076 | +5.2% |
| 1901 | 2,519 | +21.3% |
| 1911 | 2,732 | +8.5% |

| Year | Pop. | ±% |
|---|---|---|
| 1921 | 3,043 | +11.4% |
| 1931 | 2,415 | −20.6% |
| 1936 | 2,339 | −3.1% |
| 1951 | 2,235 | −4.4% |
| 1961 | 2,129 | −4.7% |

| Year | Pop. | ±% |
|---|---|---|
| 1971 | 1,675 | −21.3% |
| 1981 | 1,688 | +0.8% |
| 1991 | 1,621 | −4.0% |
| 2001 | 1,587 | −2.1% |

Source: Data from ISTAT
