= Castelmola =

- Comune
- Comune di Castelmola
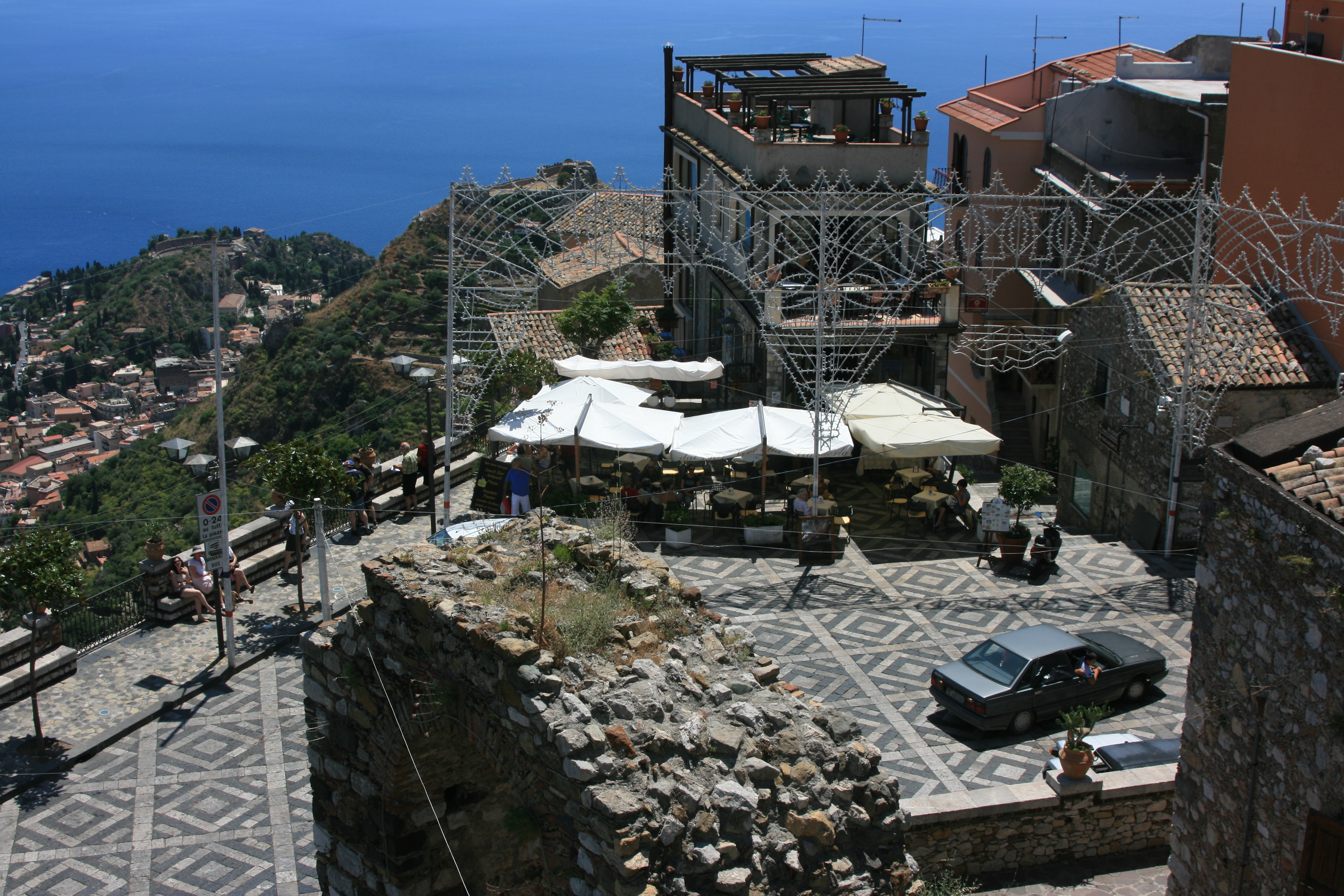

- Location within Italy Location within Sicily
- Coordinates: 37°51′35″N 15°16′35″E
- Country: Italy
- Region: Sicily
- Metropolitan city: Messina (ME)

Area
  - Total: 16.4 km^{2} (6.3 sq mi)
- Elevation: 529 m (1,736 ft)

Population (Dec. 2004)
  - Total: 1,107
  - Density: 67.5/km^{2} (175/sq mi)
- Time zone: UTC+1 (CET)
  - Summer (DST): UTC+2 (CEST)
- Postal code: 98030
- Dialing code: 0942
- Website: Official website

Castelmola (Sicilian: Castermula) is a comune (municipality) in the Province of Messina in the Italian region Sicily, located about 170 kilometres (110 mi) east of Palermo and about 40 kilometres (25 mi) southwest of Messina. As of 31 December 2004, it had a population of 1,107 and an area of 16.4 square kilometres (6.3 mi^{2}). It is one of I Borghi più belli d'Italia ("The most beautiful villages of Italy").

Castelmola has ancient Greek origins. Situated above Taormina, it formerly served as its acropolis. In the last decades, it has become a popular tourist destination. On Labour Day, which in Italy falls on 1 May, there is an annual music festival "Castelrock", held in the main square, which features live music performances by local musicians.

Castelmola borders the following municipalities: Gaggi, Letojanni, Mongiuffi Melia, Taormina.

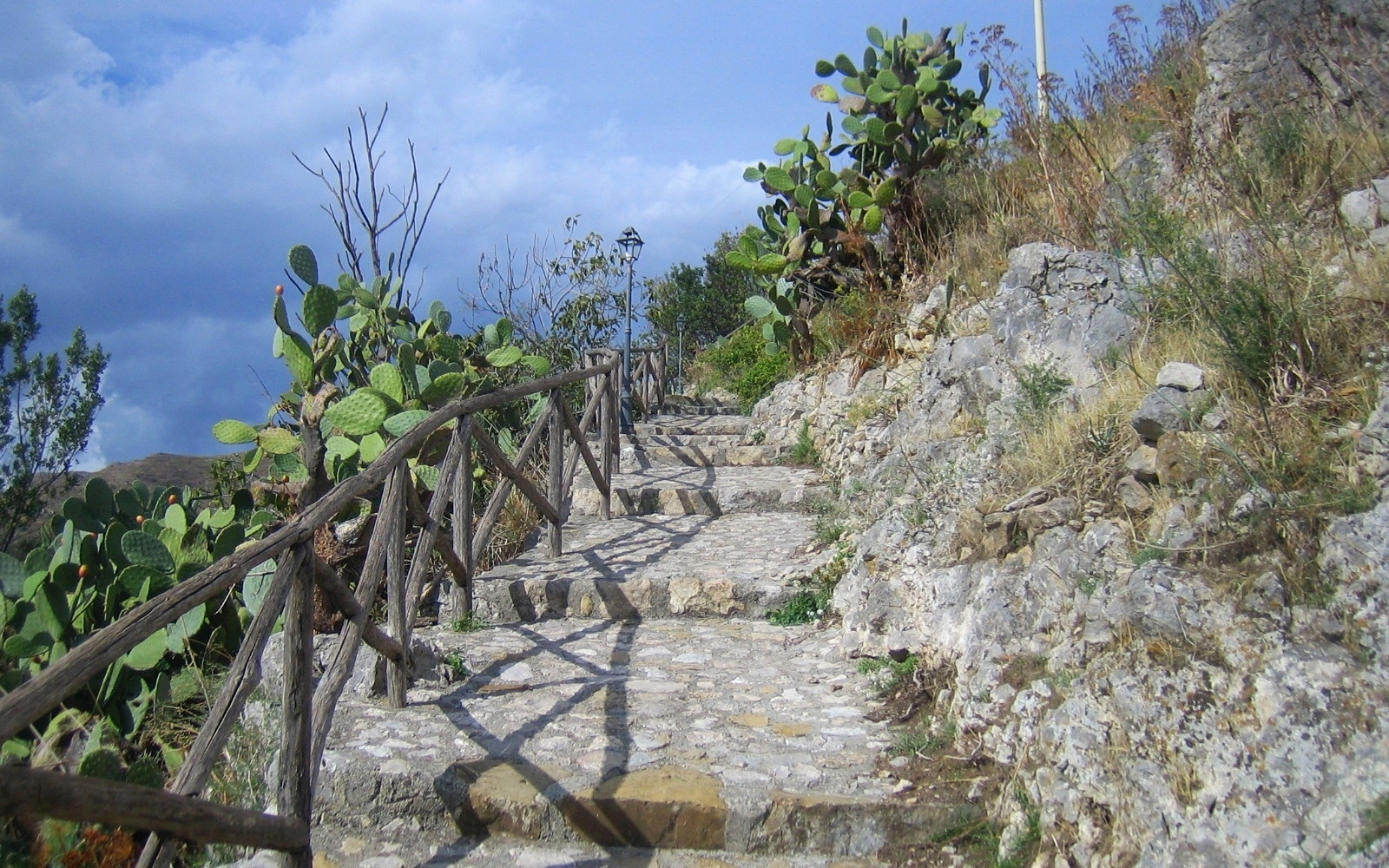
Renovated historic Saracen path in mountains between Taormina and Castelmola

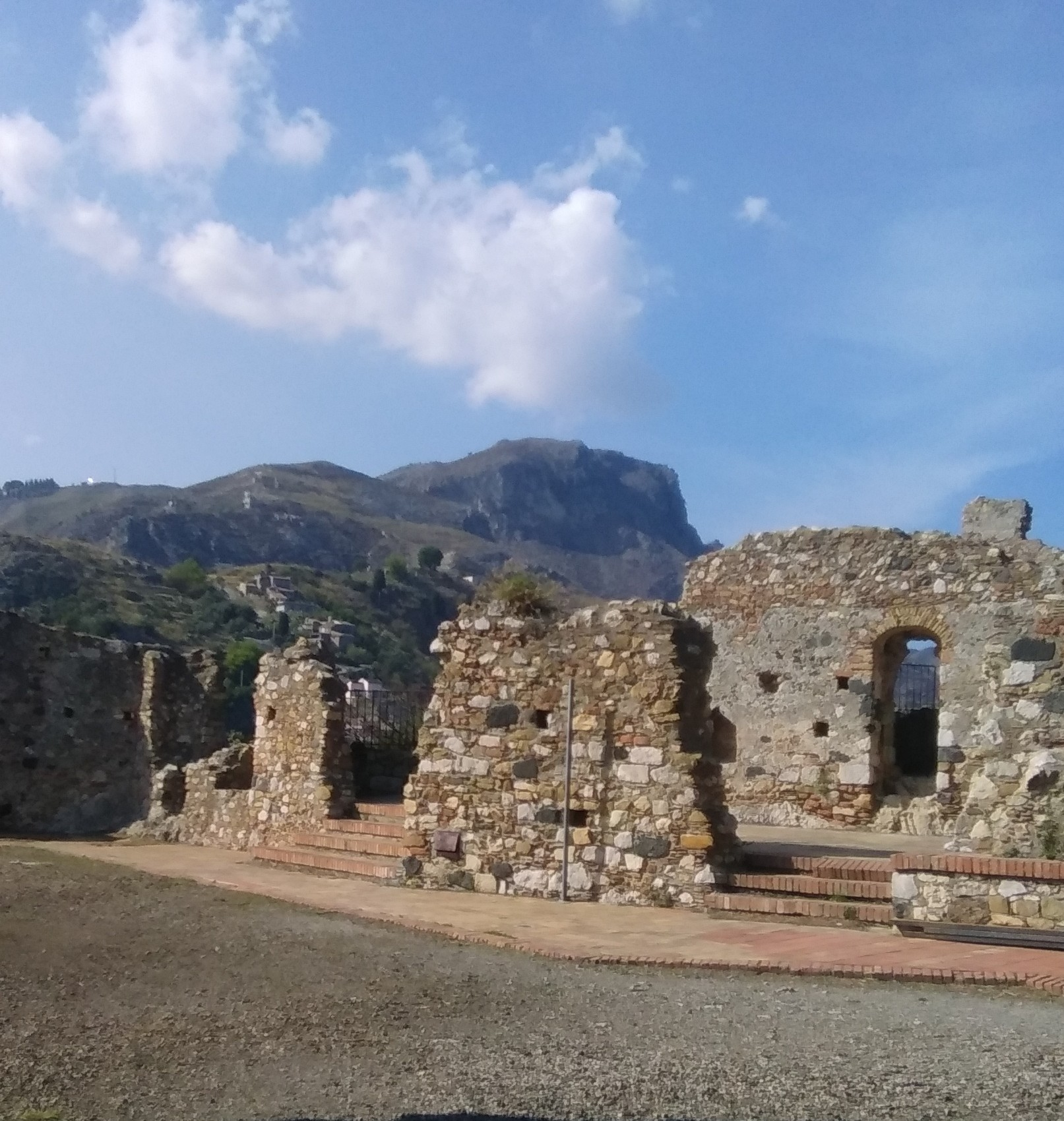
Section of ruins of the 11th century Norman-Saracen castle

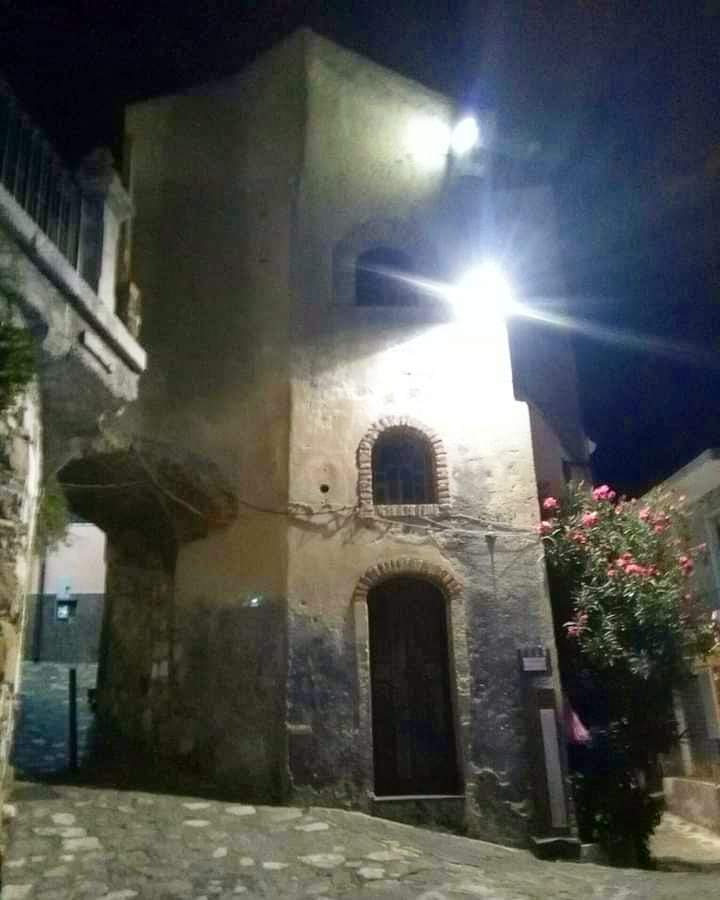
Typical structure of medieval Castelmola

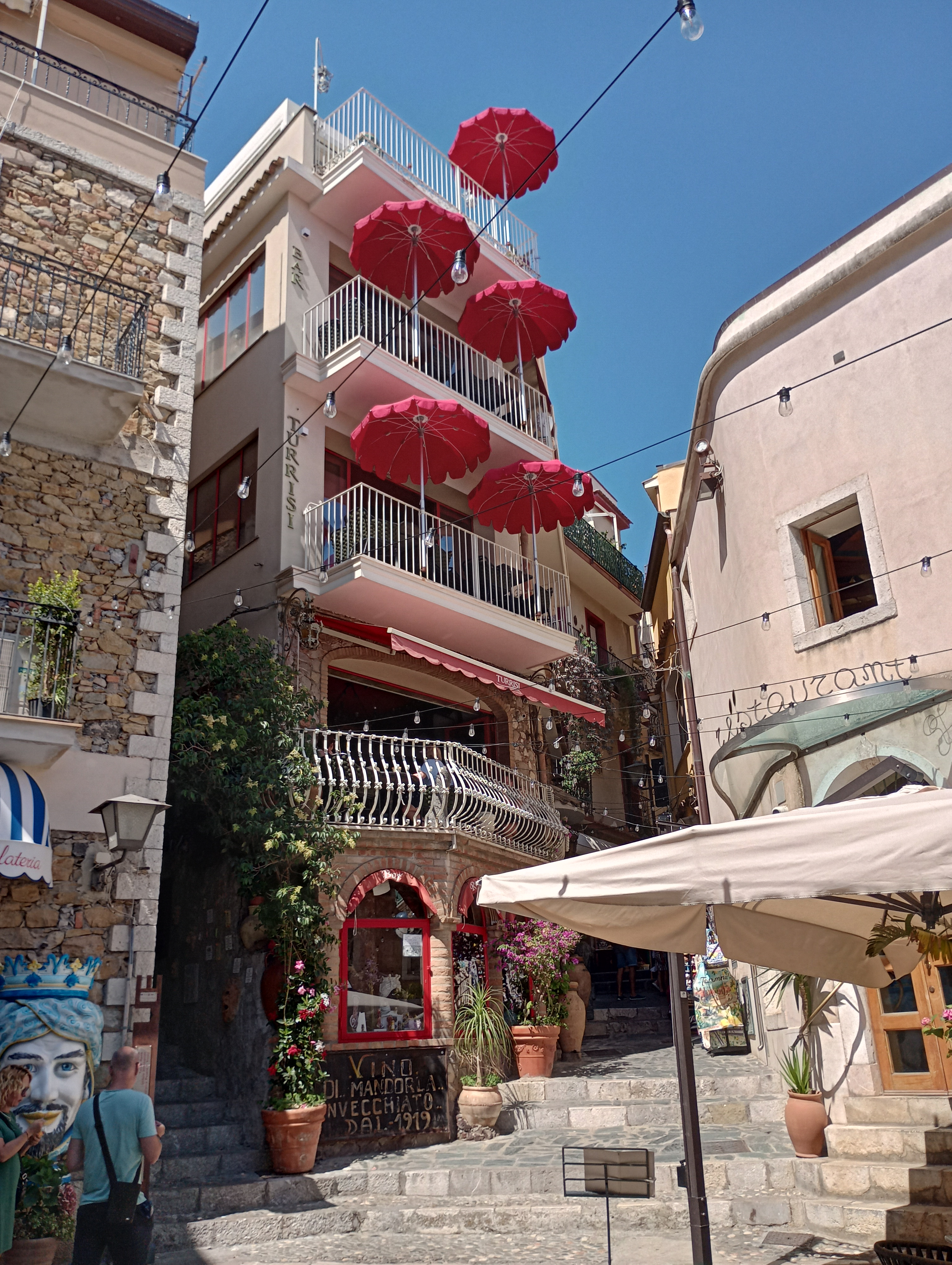
Bar Turrisi, noted for its phallic decor

== Demographic evolution ==
Historical population

| Year | Pop. | ±% |
|---|---|---|
| 1861 | 1,007 | — |
| 1871 | 1,178 | +17.0% |
| 1881 | 1,188 | +0.8% |
| 1901 | 1,421 | +19.6% |
| 1911 | 1,353 | −4.8% |

| Year | Pop. | ±% |
|---|---|---|
| 1921 | 1,219 | −9.9% |
| 1931 | 1,281 | +5.1% |
| 1936 | 1,366 | +6.6% |
| 1951 | 1,324 | −3.1% |
| 1961 | 1,175 | −11.3% |

| Year | Pop. | ±% |
|---|---|---|
| 1971 | 1,124 | −4.3% |
| 1981 | 1,133 | +0.8% |
| 1991 | 1,123 | −0.9% |
| 2001 | 1,092 | −2.8% |

Source: Data from ISTAT
