= Letojanni =

Letojanni Lethaios (Greek)
- Comune
- Comune di Letojanni
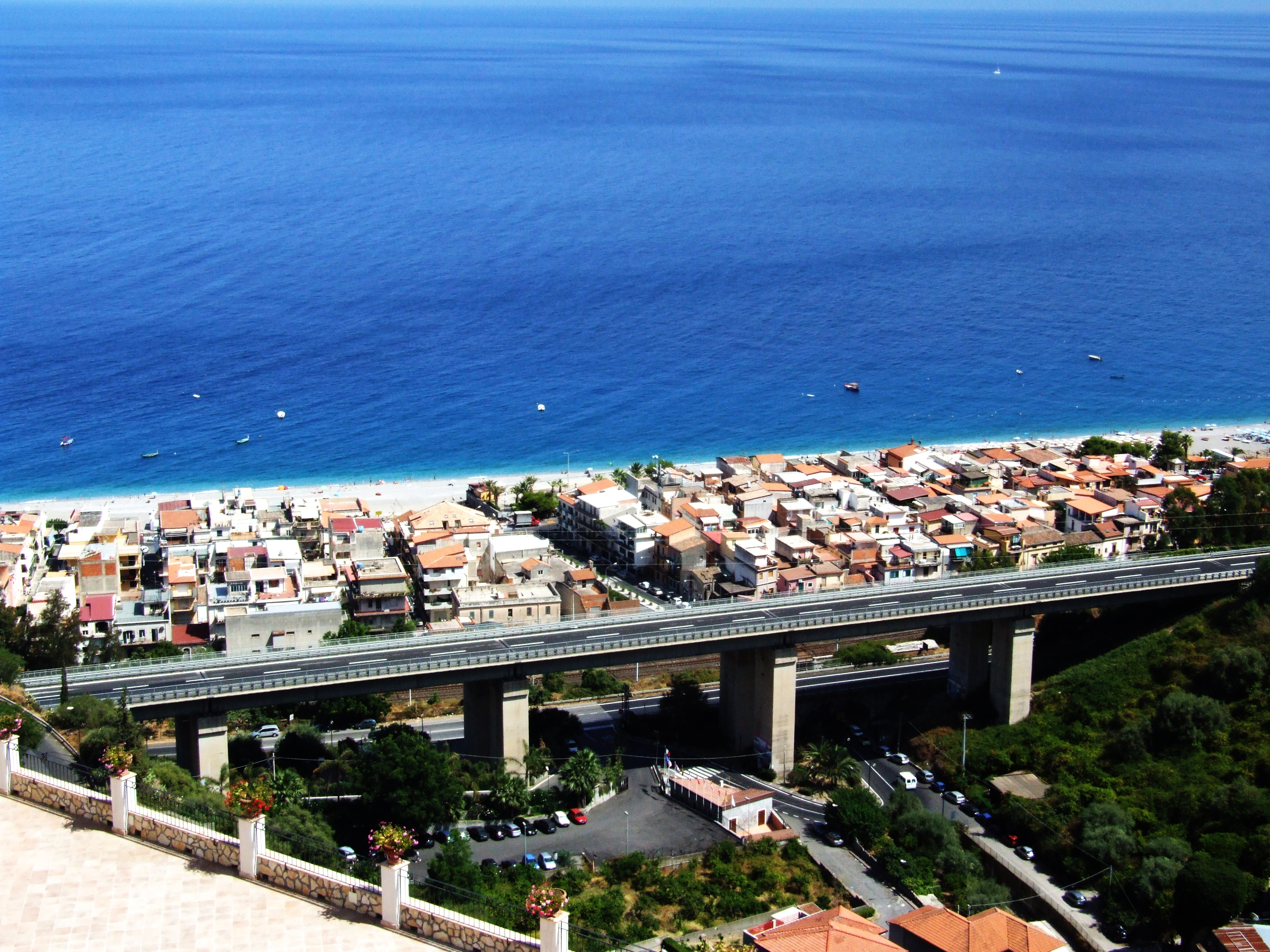

- Location within Italy Location within Sicily
- Coordinates: 37°53′N 15°18′E
- Country: Italy
- Region: Sicily
- Metropolitan city: Messina (ME)

Government
  - Mayor: Alessandro Costa

Area
  - Total: 6.8 km^{2} (2.6 sq mi)
- Elevation: 5 m (16 ft)

Population (30 November 2011)
  - Total: 2,795
  - Density: 410/km^{2} (1,100/sq mi)
- Demonym: Letojannesi
- Time zone: UTC+1 (CET)
  - Summer (DST): UTC+2 (CEST)
- Postal code: 98037
- Dialing code: 0942
- Website: Official website

Letojanni (Sicilian: Letujanni) is a comune (municipality), and coastal resort in the Province of Messina in the Italian region Sicily, located about 170 kilometres (110 mi) east of Palermo and about 40 kilometres (25 mi) southwest of Messina.

Letojanni borders the following municipalities: Castelmola, Forza d'Agrò, Gallodoro, Mongiuffi Melia, Taormina.
