= Furci Siculo =

- Comune
- Comune di Furci Siculo
- Location within Italy Location within Sicily
- Coordinates: 37°58′N 15°23′E
- Country: Italy
- Region: Sicily
- Metropolitan city: Messina (ME)
- Frazioni: Grotte, Calcare, Artale

Government
  - Mayor: Sebastiano Foti

Area
  - Total: 17.9 km^{2} (6.9 sq mi)
- Elevation: 9 m (30 ft)

Population (30 November 2011)
  - Total: 3,382
  - Density: 189/km^{2} (489/sq mi)
- Demonym: Furcesi
- Time zone: UTC+1 (CET)
  - Summer (DST): UTC+2 (CEST)
- Postal code: 98023
- Dialing code: 0942
- Website: Official website

Furci Siculo (Sicilian: Furci Sìculu) is a comune (municipality) in the Metropolitan City of Messina in the Italian region Sicily, located about 180 kilometres (110 mi) east of Palermo and about 30 kilometres (19 mi) southwest of Messina. Furci Siculo is twinned with Octeville sur Mer since 2010.

Furci Siculo borders the following municipalities: Casalvecchio Siculo, Pagliara, Roccalumera, Santa Lucia del Mela, Santa Teresa di Riva, Savoca.

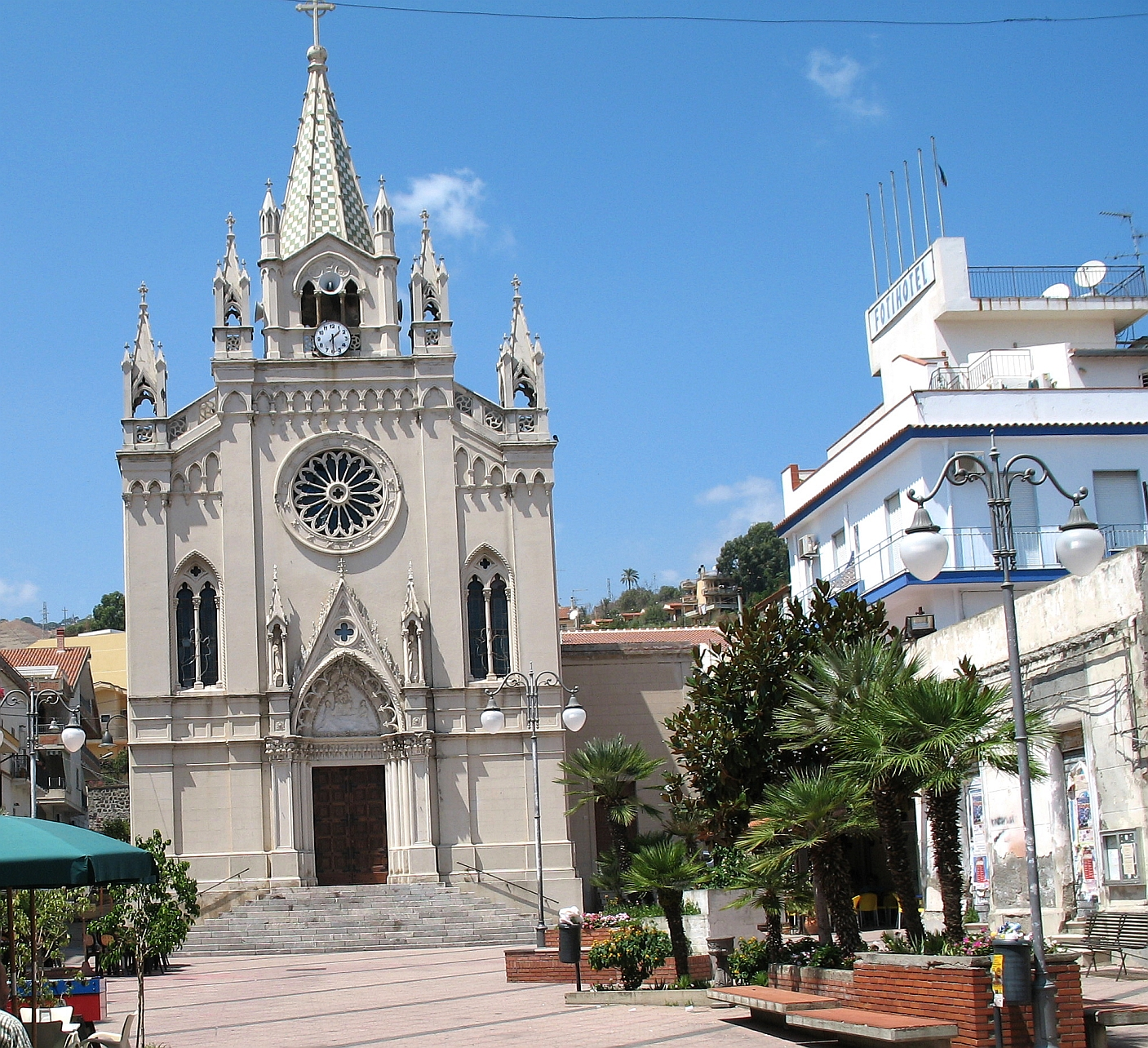
