= Santa Teresa di Riva =

Santa Teresa di Riva Santa Tresa di Riva
- Comune
- Comune di Santa Teresa di Riva
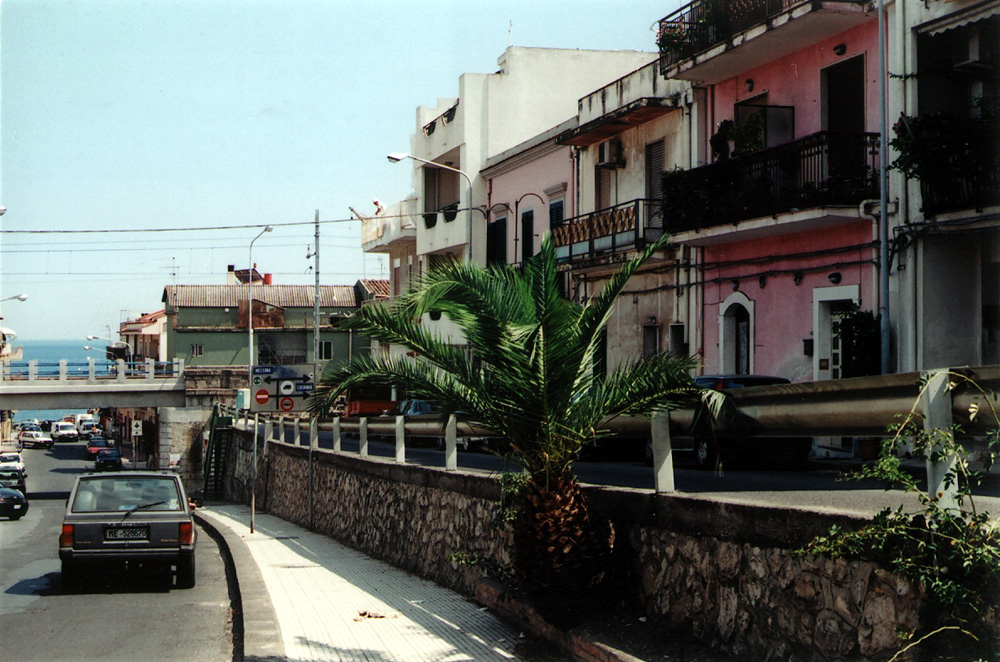
- Skyline along Via Ciumaredda

- Coat of arms

- Location within Italy Location within Sicily
- Coordinates: 37°56′N 15°21′E
- Country: Italy
- Region: Sicily
- Metropolitan city: Messina (ME)
- Frazioni: Misserio

Government
  - Mayor: Danilo Lo Giudice

Area
  - Total: 8 km^{2} (3.1 sq mi)
- Elevation: 6 m (20 ft)

Population (30 June 2012)
  - Total: 9,414
  - Density: 1,200/km^{2} (3,000/sq mi)
- Demonym: Santateresini
- Time zone: UTC+1 (CET)
  - Summer (DST): UTC+2 (CEST)
- Postal code: 98028
- Dialing code: 0942
- Patron saint: Madonna del Carmelo
- Saint day: July 16
- Website: Official website

Santa Teresa di Riva (Sicilian: Santa Tiresa di Riva) is a small town and comune in the Metropolitan City of Messina, Sicily, southern Italy, located about 15 kilometres (9 mi) from Taormina. The town was known until 1854 as Marina di Savoca when it was renamed in honor of Teresa d'Austria. The town is neighbored to the northeast by the towns of Furci Siculo and Roccalumera, to the west by Savoca, and to the southwest by Sant'Alessio Siculo and the mountainous Forza d'Agrò.

== Culture ==
On the first weekend of every August, the Festa della Madonna is held, celebrating Maria di Porto Salvo. On Saturday night, a statue of the Madonna is carried out from the church to the sea. She is placed on a boat and many town residents sail with her on their own boats. On Sunday, the Madonna is paraded around town, followed in a procession by a band and many of the town's residents. During the Festa weekend, via F. Crispi (on which the church is located) is blocked off from traffic and decorated. At the end of the night on Sunday, fireworks are performed.

== People ==
- Piero Carnabuci (1893–1958)
