= Metropolitan City of Messina =

Metropolitan City of Messina Città metropolitana di Messina (Italian) Citati mètrupulitana di Missina (Sicilian)
- Metropolitan City
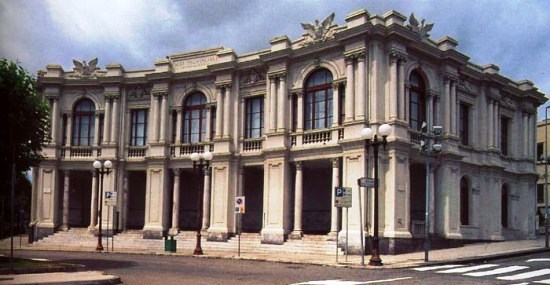
- Palazzo del Leoni, the metropolitan city seat

- Coat of arms

- Location of the Metropolitan City of Messina in Italy
- Coordinates: 38°11′00″N 15°33′00″E
- Country: Italy
- Region: Sicily
- Established: 4 August 2015
- Capital(s): Messina
- Municipalities: 108

Government
  - Metropolitan mayor: Federico Basile

Area
  - Total: 3,266.12 km^{2} (1,261.06 sq mi)

Population (2026)
  - Total: 594,074
  - Density: 181.890/km^{2} (471.092/sq mi)

GDP
  - Metro: €10.980 billion (2015)
  - Per capita: €17,076 (2015)
- Time zone: UTC+1 (CET)
  - Summer (DST): UTC+2 (CEST)
- Postal code: 98121-98168 (Messina); 98020-98079 (other municipalities)
- ISO 3166 code: IT-ME
- Vehicle registration: ME
- ISTAT code: 283
- Website: Official website

The Metropolitan City of Messina (Italian: città metropolitana di Messina) is a metropolitan city in the autonomous island region of Sicily in Italy. Its capital is the city of Messina. It replaced the province of Messina and comprises Messina and 107 other municipalities.

With a population of 594,074, it is the 12th most populous out of the 15 metropolitan cities in the country. According to Eurostat in 2014, the FUA of the metropolitan area of Messina had 277,584 inhabitants. The nearby archipelago of Aeolian Islands is also administratively a part of the Metropolitan City of Messina.

== History ==
It was first created by the reform of local authorities (Law 142/1990) and then established on 15 August 2015.

== Geography ==
The metropolitan city borders with the Metropolitan City of Palermo (the former province of Palermo), the Metropolitan City of Catania (the former province of Catania) and the province of Enna. Part of its territory includes the Metropolitan area of the Strait of Messina, shared with Reggio Calabria.

It had an area of 3,247 square kilometres (1,254 mi^{2}), which amounts to 12.6 percent of total area of the island, and a total population of more 650,000. There are 108 comuni (sing.: comune) in the metropolitan city.

The metropolitan city included the Aeolian Islands, all part of the comune (municipality) of Lipari (with the exception of Salina). The territory is largely mountainous, with the exception of alluvial plain at the mouths of the various rivers. The largest plain is that in the area between Milazzo and Barcellona Pozzo di Gotto, which, together with Messina, form a metropolitan area of some 500,000 inhabitants, one of the largest in southern Italy. Much of the population is concentrated in the coastal area, after the hill towns have been largely abandoned from the 19th century.

The main mountain ridges are the Peloritani, up to 1,300 metres (4,300 ft) in elevation, and the Nebrodi, up to 1,900 metres (6,200 ft), which are included in a Regional Natural Reserve.

Rivers of the metropolitan city include the Alcantara and the Pollina, which forms the border with the Metropolitan City of Palermo to the west.

=== Gallery ===
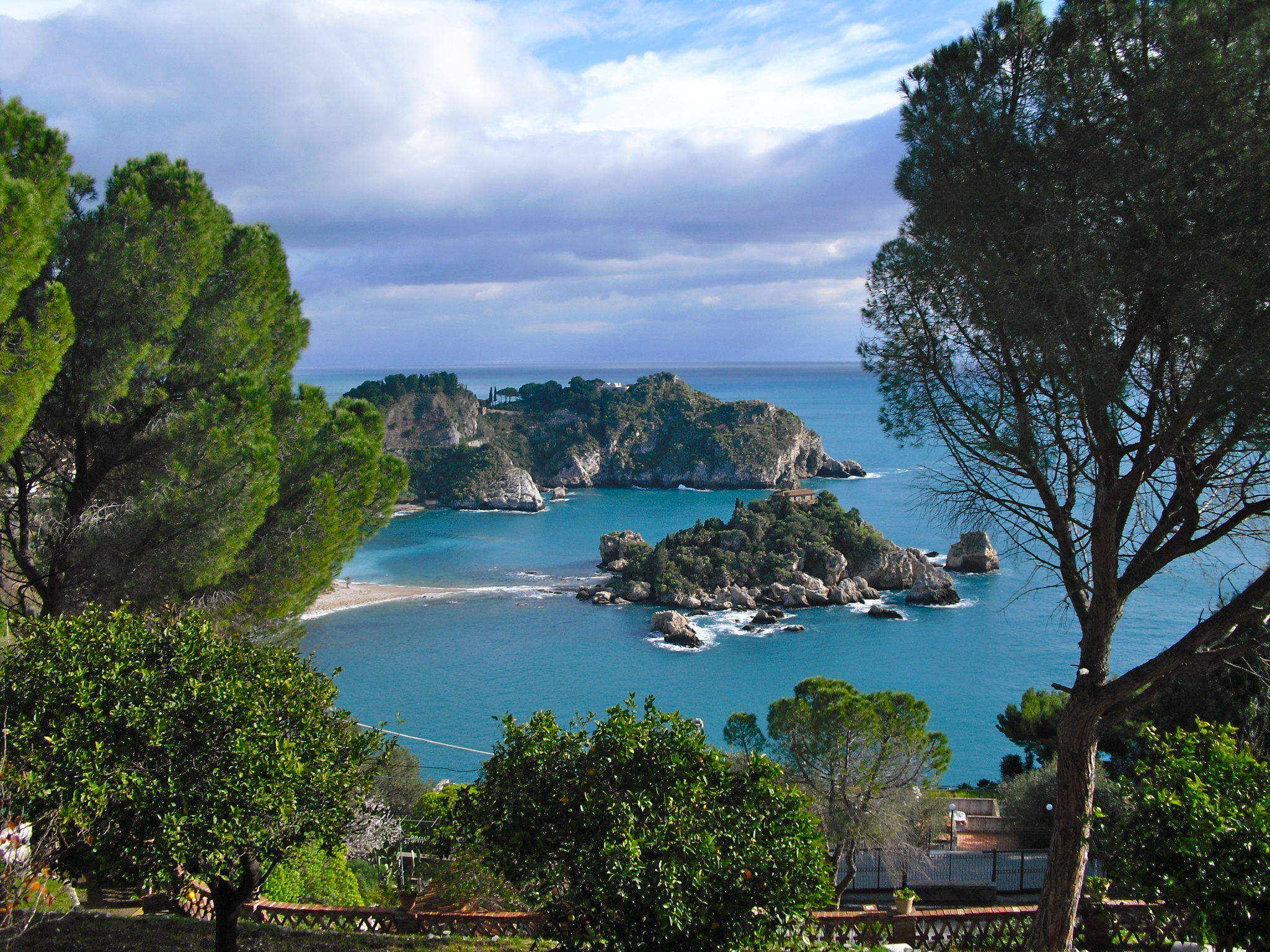
Isola Bella, Taormina

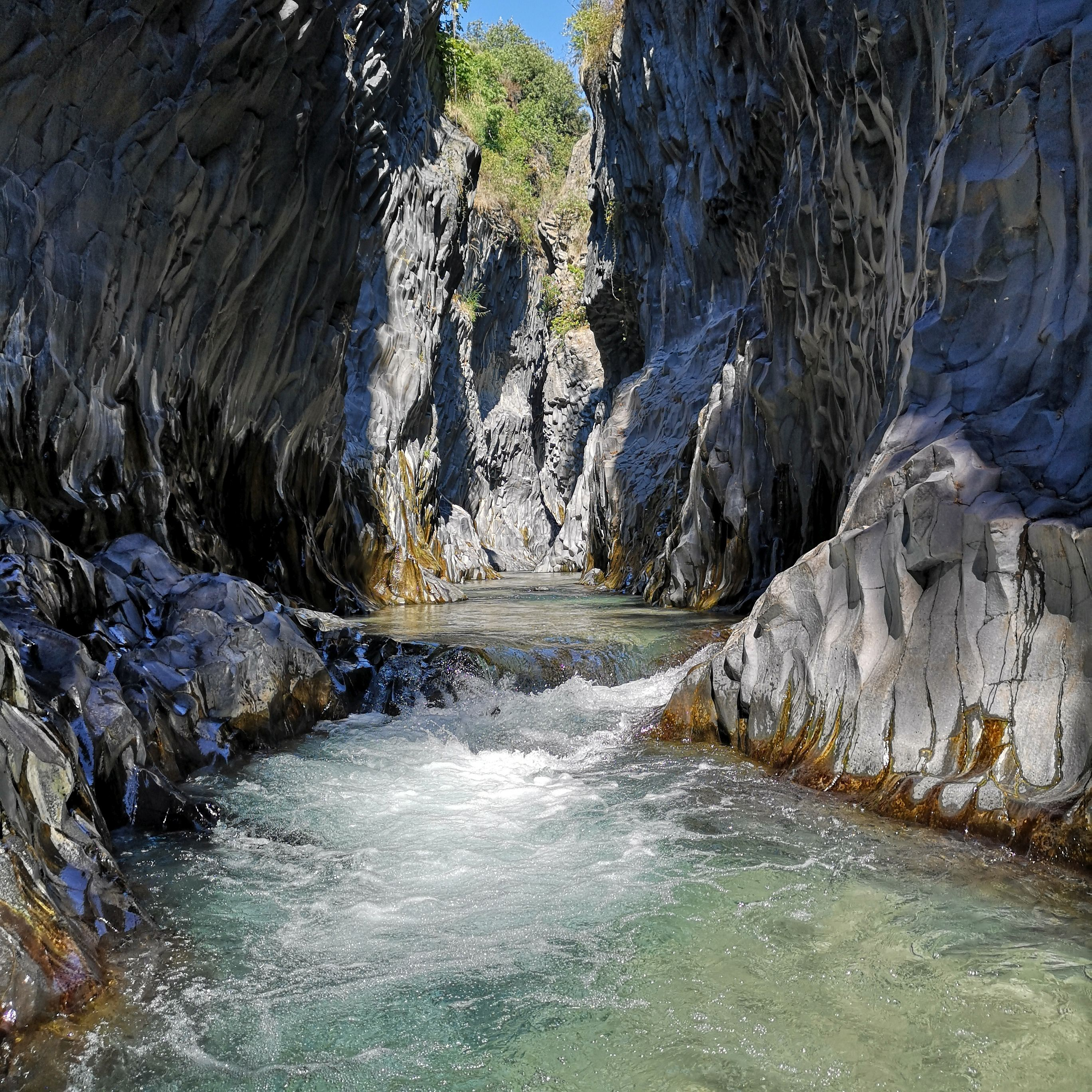
Alcantara canyon

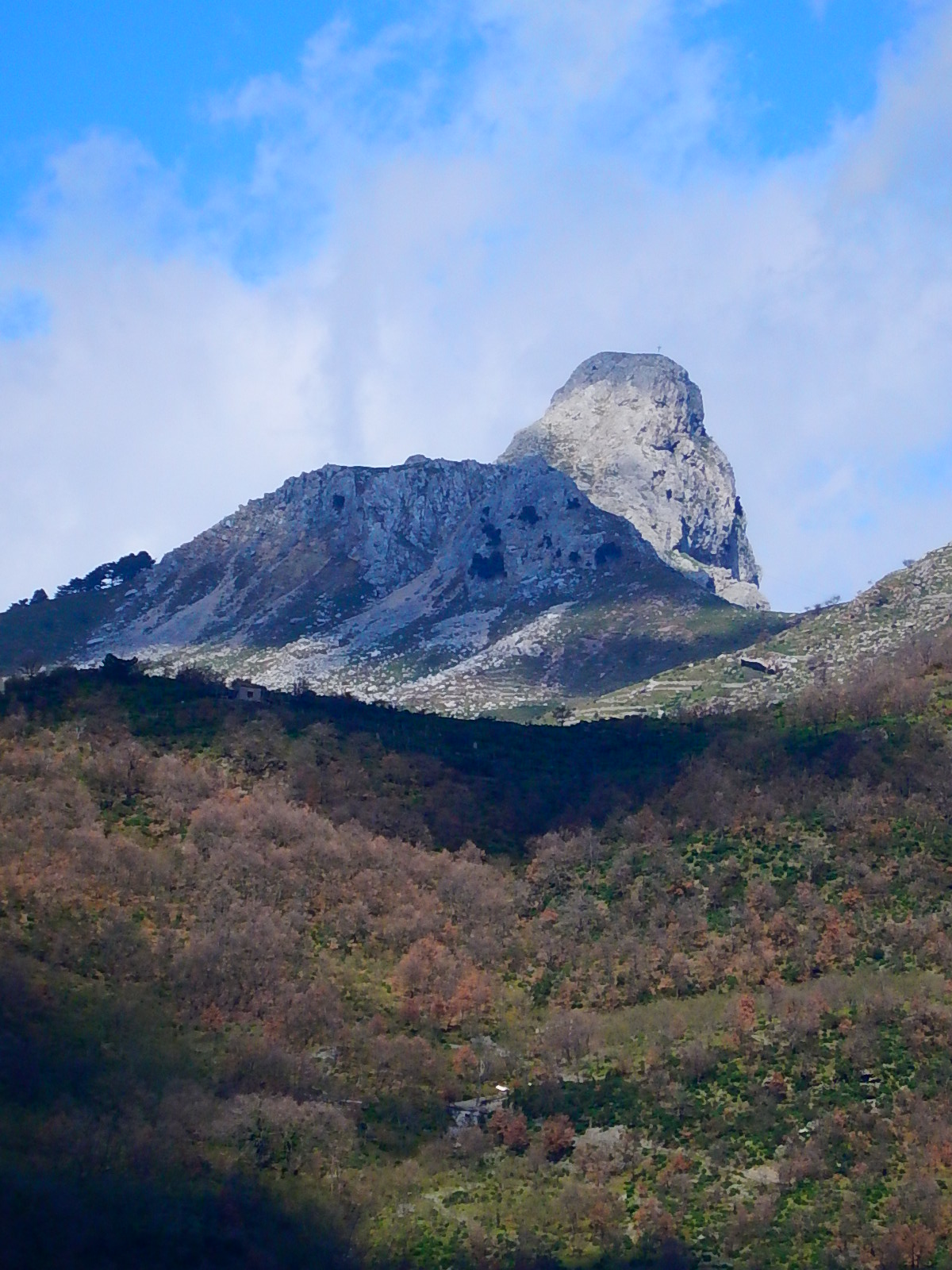
The Rocca Salvatesta (1,340 metres (4,400 ft)) from Fondachelli-Fantina

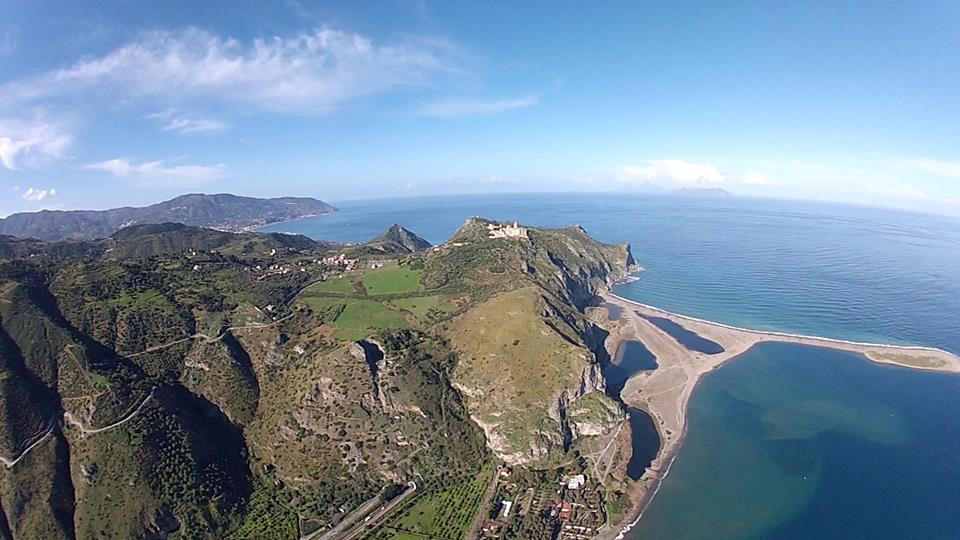
The Sanctuary of Tindari over Marinello lakes

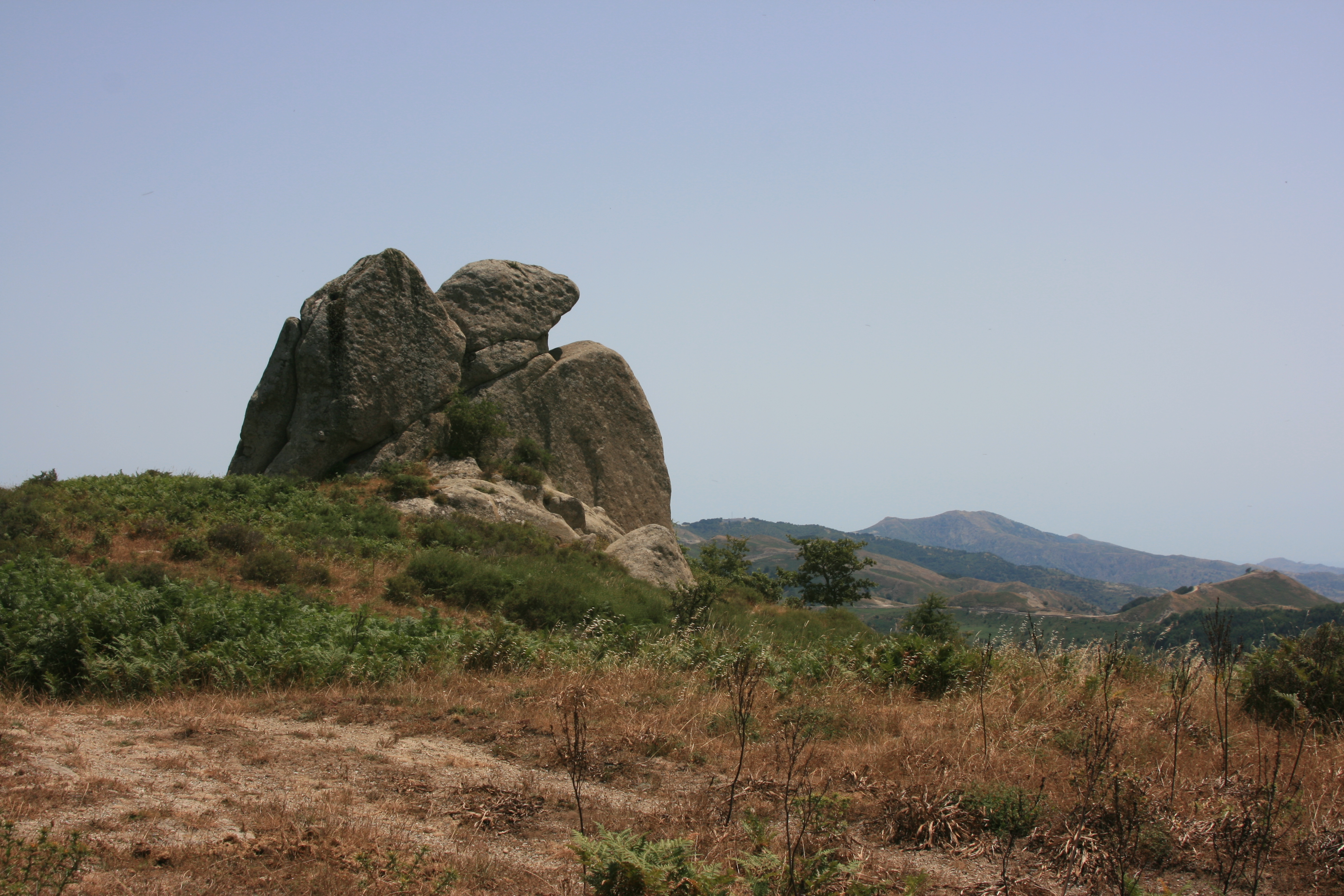
Megaliths of Argimusco, Montalbano-Elicona

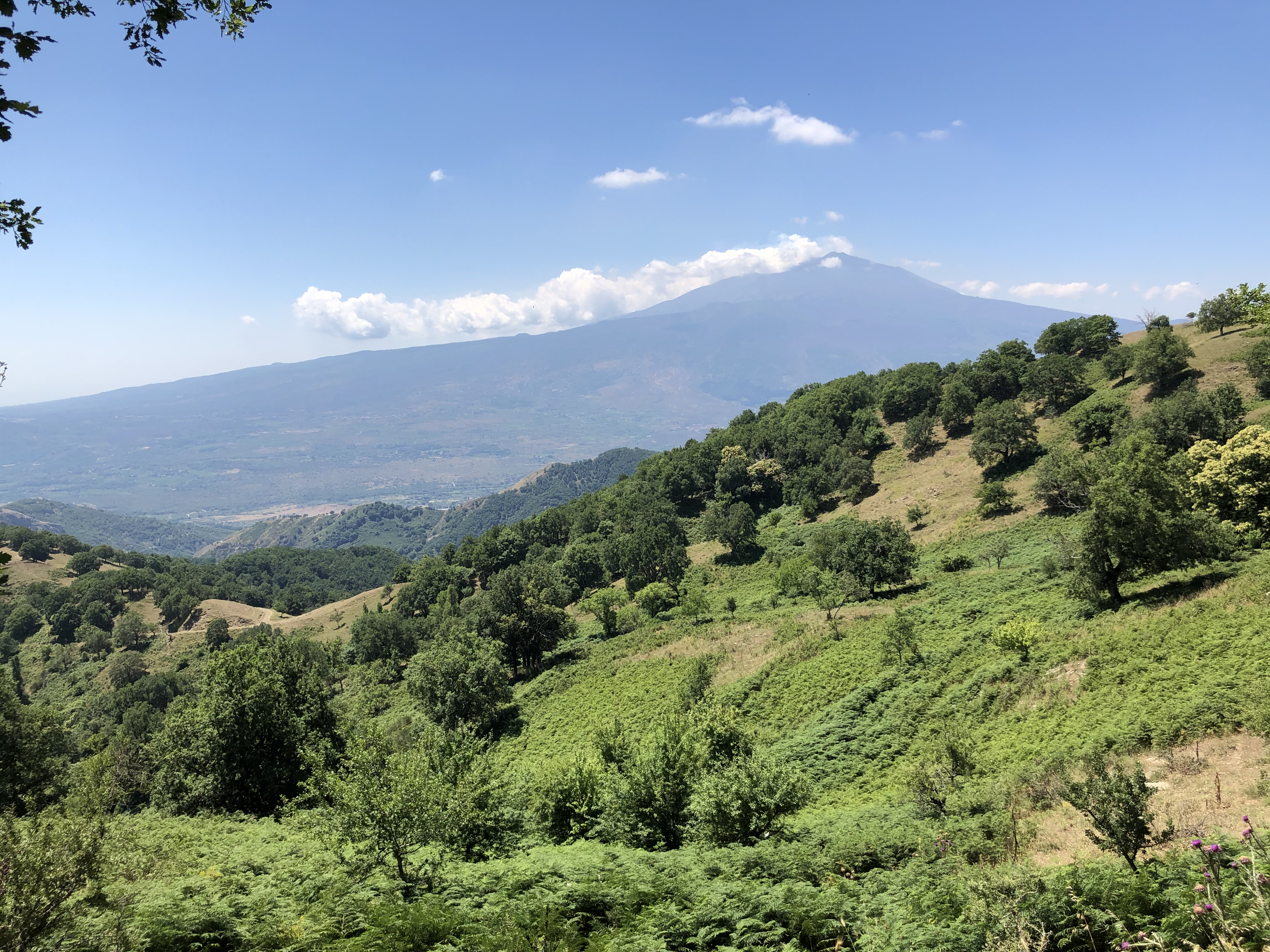
Bosco di Malabotta Nature Reserve

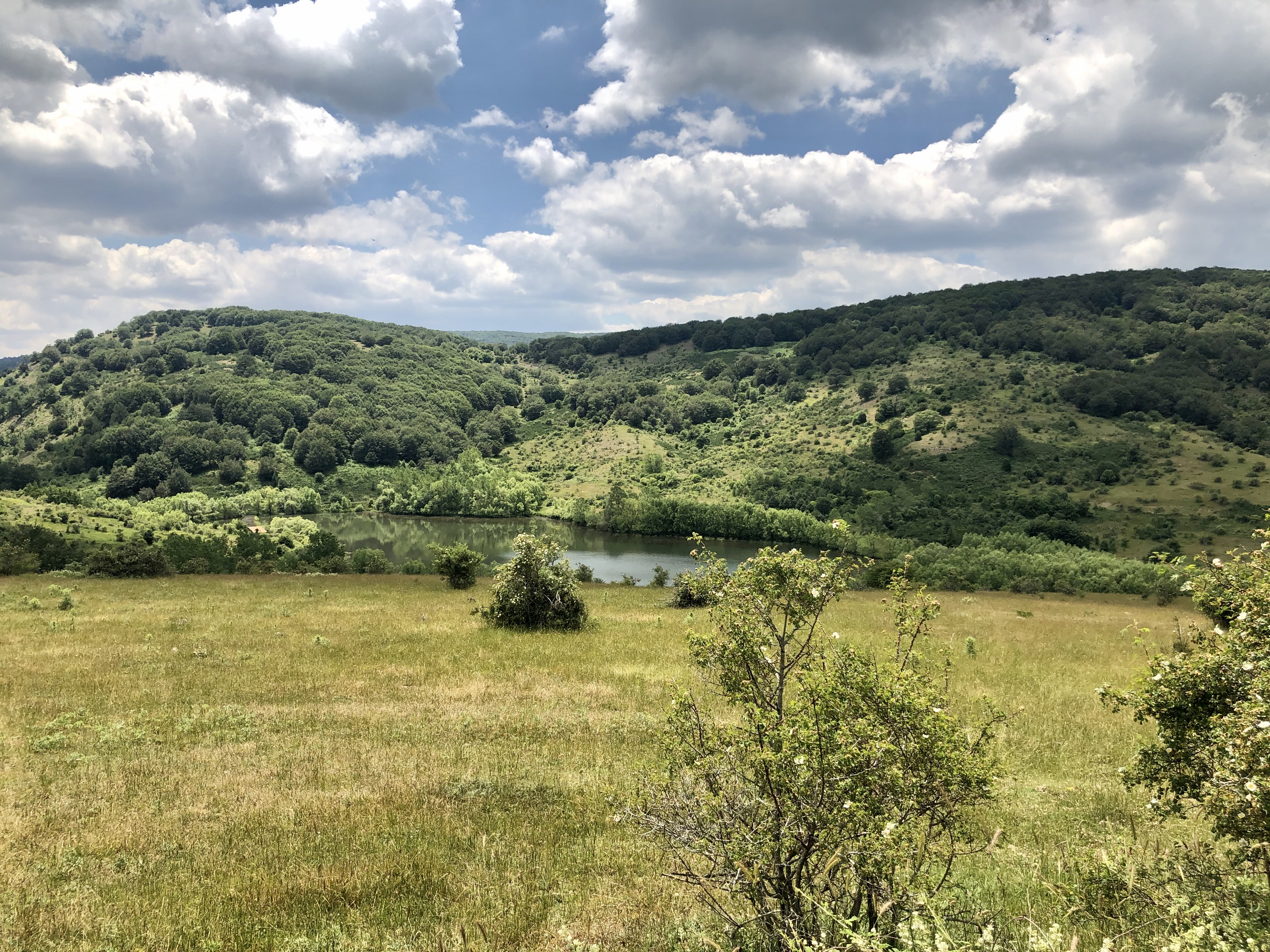
Nebrodi

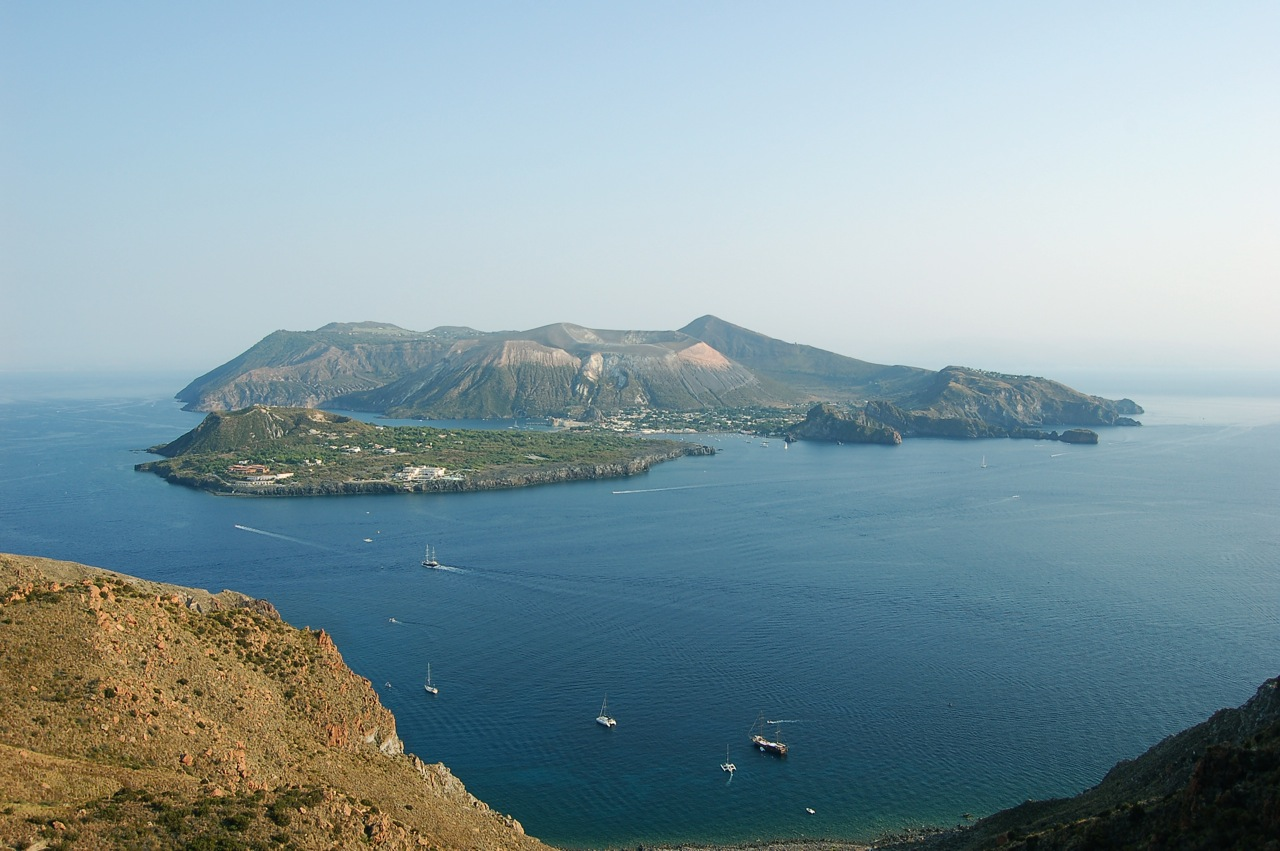
Aeolian Islands

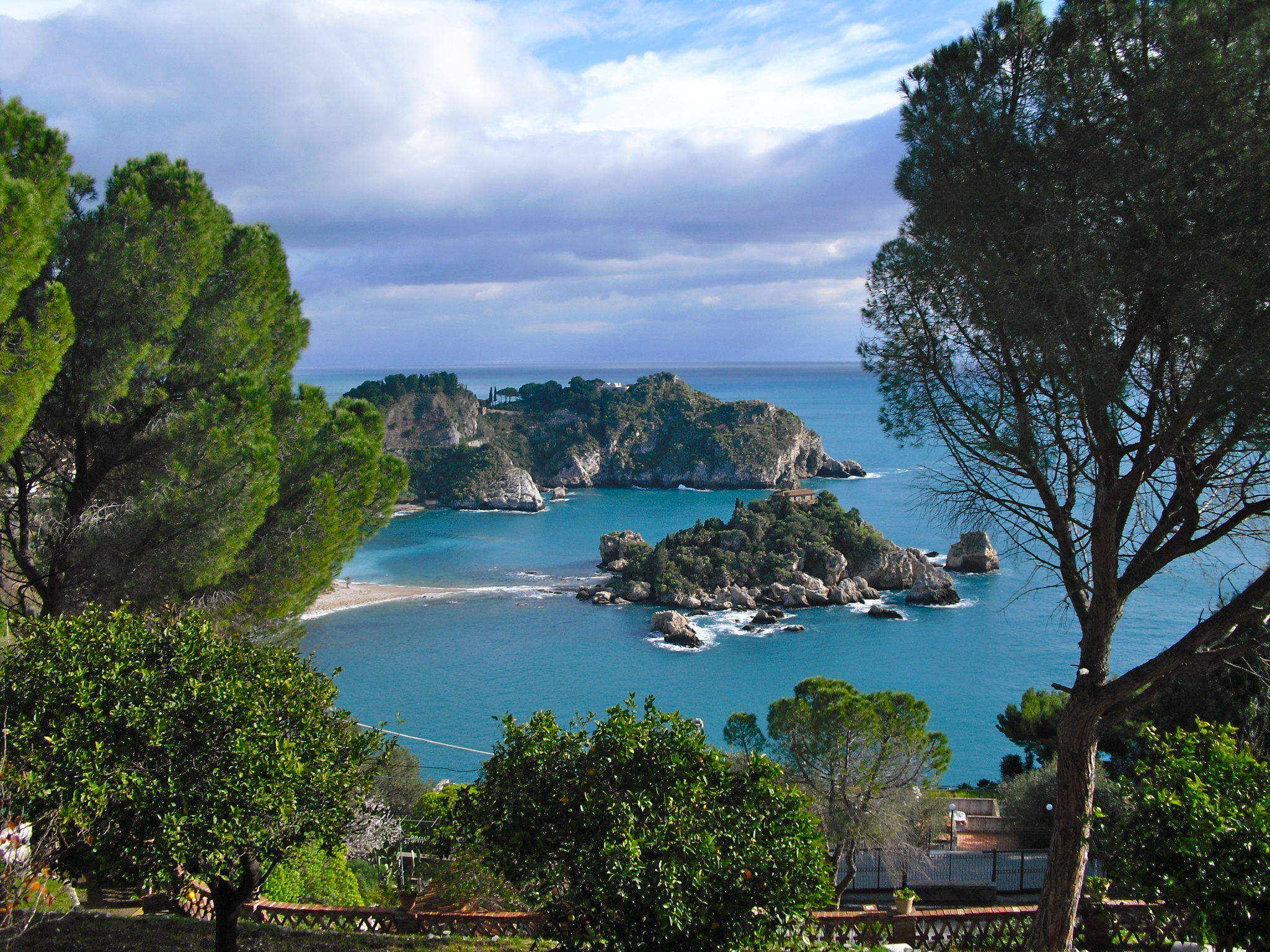
the Isola Bella at Taormina city

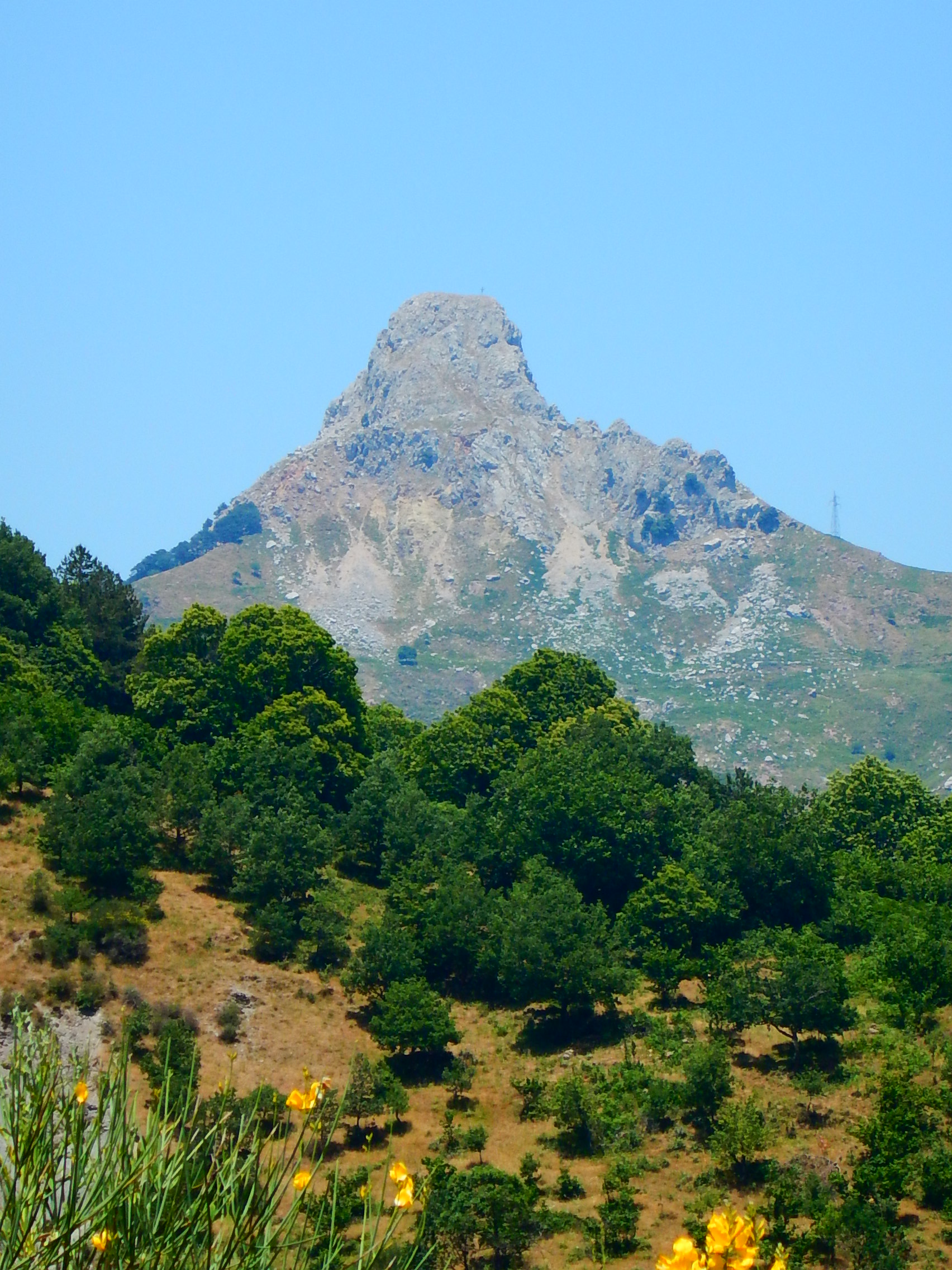
The Rocca Salvatesta face from Fondachelli-Fantina town

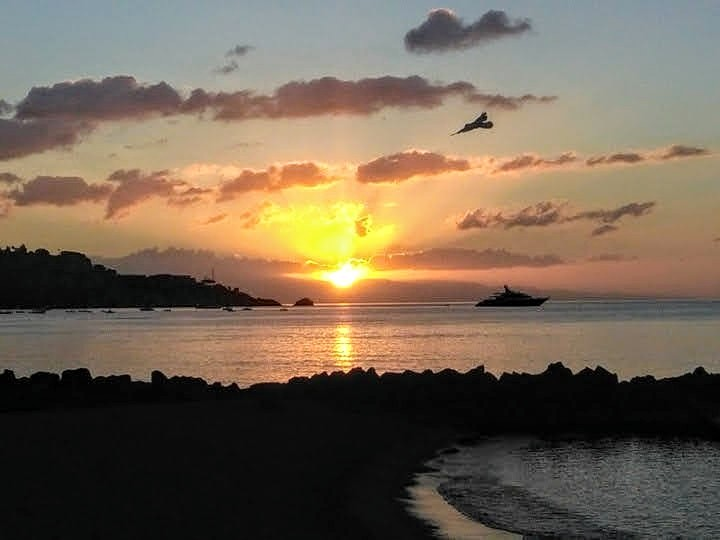
Giardini Naxos, a popular resort in the Metropolitan City of Messina

== Government ==
=== List of metropolitan mayors ===
	Metropolitan Mayor	Term start	Term end	Party
1	Renato Accorinti	10 June 2016	26 June 2018	Independent (left-wing)
2	Cateno De Luca	26 June 2018	14 February 2022	Independent (centre)
3	Federico Basile	16 June 2022	Incumbent	Independent (right-wing)

=== Municipalities ===
The metropolitan city has 108 municipalities:

- Acquedolci
- Alcara Li Fusi
- Alì
- Alì Terme
- Antillo
- Barcellona Pozzo di Gotto
- Basicò
- Brolo
- Capizzi
- Capo d'Orlando
- Capri Leone
- Caronia
- Casalvecchio Siculo
- Castel di Lucio
- Castell'Umberto
- Castelmola
- Castroreale
- Cesarò
- Condrò
- Falcone
- Ficarra
- Fiumedinisi
- Floresta
- Fondachelli-Fantina
- Forza d'Agrò
- Francavilla di Sicilia
- Frazzanò
- Furci Siculo
- Furnari
- Gaggi
- Galati Mamertino
- Gallodoro
- Giardini-Naxos
- Gioiosa Marea
- Graniti
- Gualtieri Sicaminò
- Itala
- Leni
- Letojanni
- Librizzi
- Limina
- Lipari
- Longi
- Malfa
- Malvagna
- Mandanici
- Mazzarrà Sant'Andrea
- Merì
- Messina
- Milazzo
- Militello Rosmarino
- Mirto
- Mistretta
- Mojo Alcantara
- Monforte San Giorgio
- Mongiuffi Melia
- Montagnareale
- Montalbano Elicona
- Motta Camastra
- Motta d'Affermo
- Naso
- Nizza di Sicilia
- Novara di Sicilia
- Oliveri
- Pace del Mela
- Pagliara
- Patti
- Pettineo
- Piraino
- Raccuja
- Reitano
- Roccafiorita
- Roccalumera
- Roccavaldina
- Roccella Valdemone
- Rodì Milici
- Rometta
- San Filippo del Mela
- San Fratello
- San Marco d'Alunzio
- San Pier Niceto
- San Piero Patti
- San Salvatore di Fitalia
- San Teodoro
- Sant'Agata di Militello
- Sant'Alessio Siculo
- Sant'Angelo di Brolo
- Santa Domenica Vittoria
- Santa Lucia del Mela
- Santa Marina Salina
- Santa Teresa di Riva
- Santo Stefano di Camastra
- Saponara
- Savoca
- Scaletta Zanclea
- Sinagra
- Spadafora
- Taormina
- Terme Vigliatore
- Torregrotta
- Torrenova
- Tortorici
- Tripi
- Tusa
- Ucria
- Valdina
- Venetico
- Villafranca Tirrena

== Demographics ==
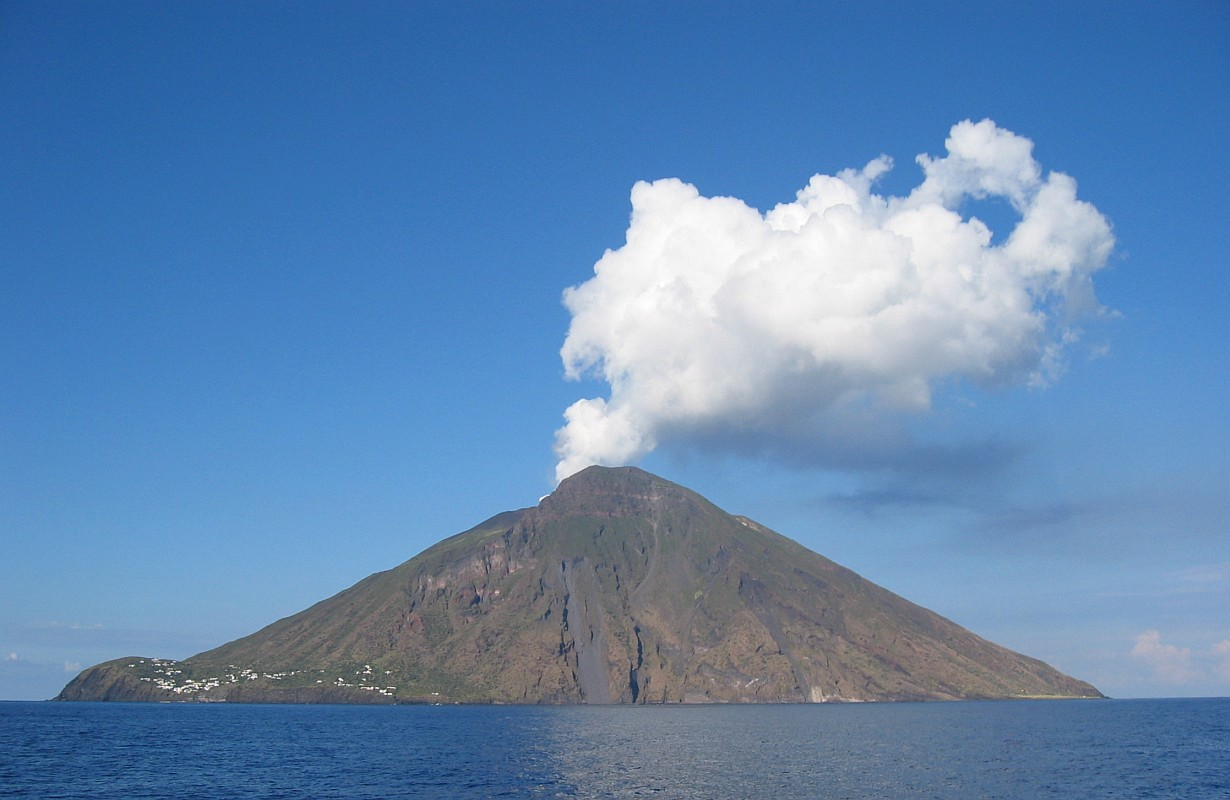
Stromboli volcano, Aeolian Islands

As of 2026, the population is 594,074, of which 48.5% are male, and 51.5% are female. Minors make up 14.0% of the population, and seniors make up 26.2%.

Historical population

Year	Pop.	±%
1861	399,688	—
1871	426,402	+6.7%
1881	467,233	+9.6%
1901	550,895	+17.9%
1911	545,974	−0.9%
1921	613,028	+12.3%
1931	605,456	−1.2%
1936	627,093	+3.6%

Year	Pop.	±%
1951	667,963	+6.5%
1961	685,260	+2.6%
1971	654,703	−4.5%
1981	669,323	+2.2%
1991	646,871	−3.4%
2001	662,450	+2.4%
2011	649,824	−1.9%
2021	603,229	−7.2%

Source: ISTAT

=== Immigration ===
As of 2025, immigrants make up 7.6% of the population. The 5 largest foreign countries of birth are Romania, Argentina, Morocco, Sri Lanka, and Germany.

== Traditions and folklore ==
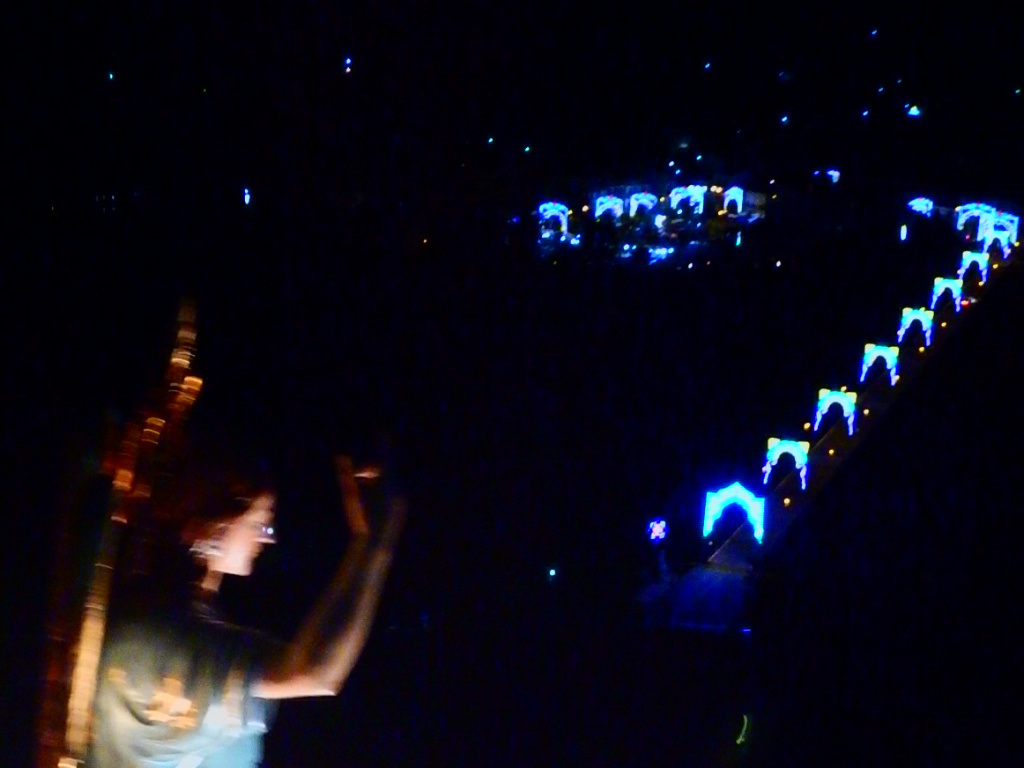
Feast of the Guardian Angel, the second Sunday of July at Fondachelli Fantina

date	Feast	City
6 December	Feast of Saint Nicholas	Saponara
8 December	Feast of the Immaculate Conception	Saponara
13 December	Feast of Saint Lucy	Santa Lucia del Mela
6 January	living Nativity scene	Montalbano Elicona
20 January	Feast of Saint Sebastian	Mistretta
19 March	Feast of Saint Joseph	Oliveri
19 March and Tuesday after Easter	Feast of Saint Joseph	Piraino
19 March	Feast of Saint Joseph	Merì
the 11-12 and third Saturday of May	Feast of Saint Philip of Agira	Limina
3 June	Feast of the Madonna della Lettera	Messina
3 June	Feast of the Madonna della Lettera	Itala
12 June	Feast of the Madonna di Montalto	Messina
13 June and following Sunday	Feast of Anthony of Padua	Milazzo
24 June	Feast of Saint John the Baptist	Castanea, Messina
29 June	Feast of Saint Peter and Saint Paul	San Pier Niceto
2 July	Feast of Our Lady of Graces	Furci Siculo
first Sunday of July	Feast of Saint Maria Annunziata	Merì
first Sunday of July	Feast of the Madonna of the saint water	Valdina
first Sunday of July	Feast of Our Lady of Graces	Naso
second Sunday of July	Feast of the Saint Guardian Angel	Fondachelli-Fantina
16 July	Feast of Our Lady of Mount Carmel	Roccalumera
25 July	Feast of the Saint James	Capizzi
first Sunday of August	Feast on the sea of the Saint Mary of Porto Salvo	Santa Teresa di Riva
first Sunday of August	Feast on the sea of the Saint Sebastian	Graniti
3 August	Feast of the Madonna of Dinnammare	Larderia, Messina
5 August	Feast of the Saint Mary of the Snows	Santa Lucia del Mela
9–10 August	Feast of Saint Lorenz	Frazzanò
second Sunday of August	Feast of Saint Lucy	Savoca
second Sunday of August	Feast of Saint Sebastian	Gaggi
14–16 August	Feast on the Assumption of Mary	Gallodoro
15 August	Feast on the Assumption of Mary	Messina
15 August	Feast on the Assumption of Mary	Novara di Sicilia
first Sunday of September	Feast of the Madonna of the chain	Mongiuffi Melia
8 September	Feast of the Madonna of the Divine providence	Fondachelli-Fantina
7–8 September	Feast of the black Madonna of Tindari	Tindari

== Transport ==
=== Motorways ===
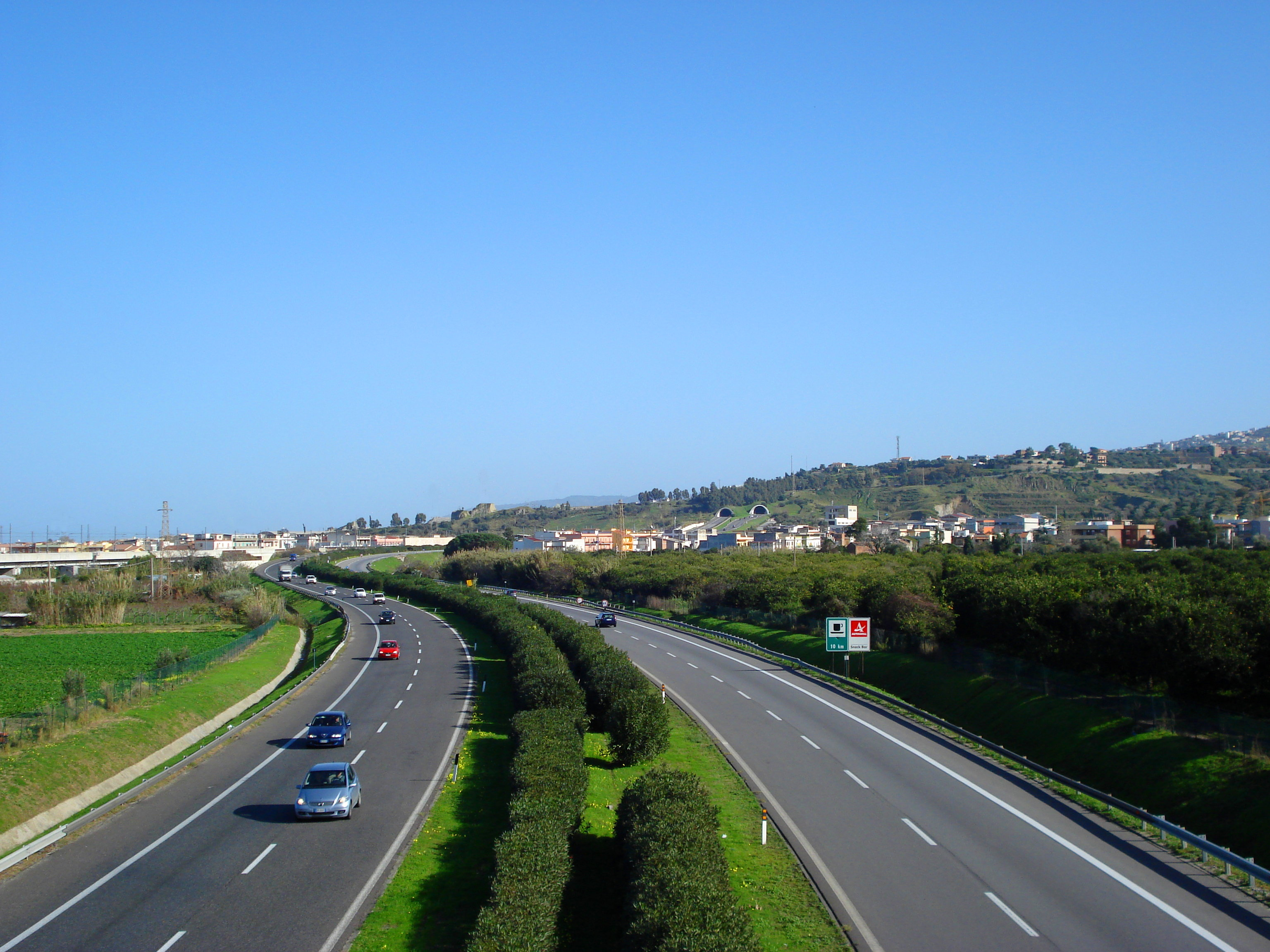
The Autostrada A20 Messina - Catania near Torregrotta

The metropolitan city is crossed by the following motorways (in Italian, autostrade):

- Autostrada A18: Messina - Catania
- Autostrada A20: Messina - Palermo

=== Railway lines ===
- Messina–Syracuse railway

== See also ==
- Province of Messina
- Strait of Messina metropolitan area
- Railway network of Sicily
- Niceto Valley
- Niceto
