= Capizzi =

- Comune
- Comune di Capizzi
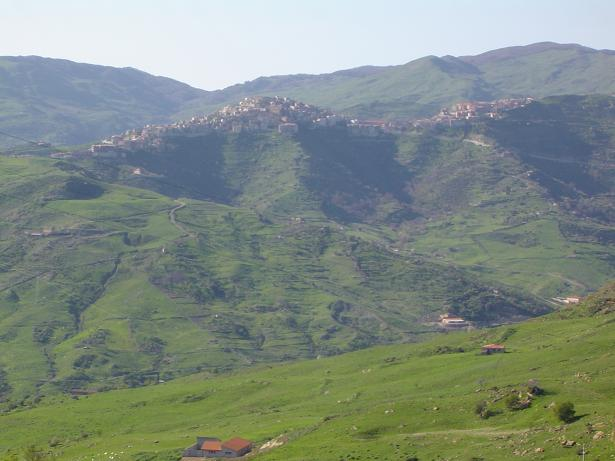

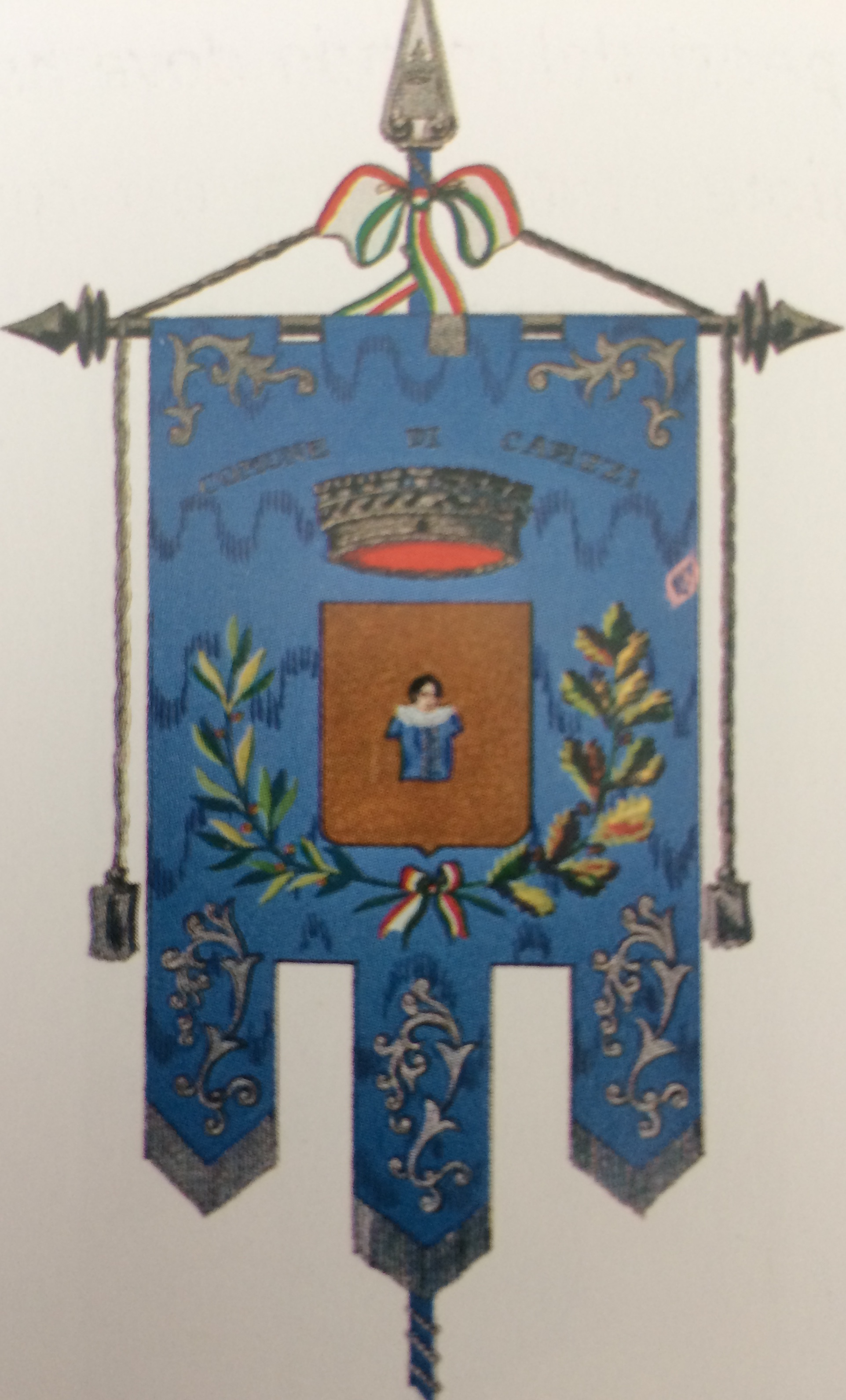
- Coat of arms

- Location within Italy Location within Sicily
- Coordinates: 37°51′N 14°29′E
- Country: Italy
- Region: Sicily
- Metropolitan city: Messina (ME)

Government
  - Mayor: Giacomo Leonardo Purrazzo

Area
  - Total: 69.9 km^{2} (27.0 sq mi)
- Elevation: 1,100 m (3,600 ft)

Population (1 January 2014)
  - Total: 2,284
  - Density: 32.7/km^{2} (84.6/sq mi)
- Time zone: UTC+1 (CET)
  - Summer (DST): UTC+2 (CEST)
- Postal code: 98031
- Dialing code: 0935
- Website: Official website

Capizzi (Greek: Καπίτιον; Latin: Capitium) is a comune (municipality) in the Metropolitan City of Messina in the Italian region Sicily, located about 100 kilometres (62 mi) southeast of Palermo and about 100 kilometres (62 mi) southwest of Messina.

Capizzi borders the following municipalities: Caronia, Cerami, Cesarò, Mistretta.

== History ==
The origins of Capizzi are unclear, although certainly ancient. Capitium is mentioned by Cicero and Ptolemy, and appears from the former to have been a place of some importance. He mentions it in conjunction with Haluntium (modern San Marco d'Alunzio), Enguium (modern Gangi), and other towns in the northern part of the island, and Ptolemy enumerates it among the inland cities of Sicily. Its situation on the southern slope of the mountains of Caronia, about 26 kilometres (16 mi) from the Tyrrhenian Sea, and the same distance from Gangi (Enguium), accords well with the ancient indications.
