= San Filippo del Mela =

San Filippo del Mela San Filippu
- Comune
- Comune di San Filippo del Mela
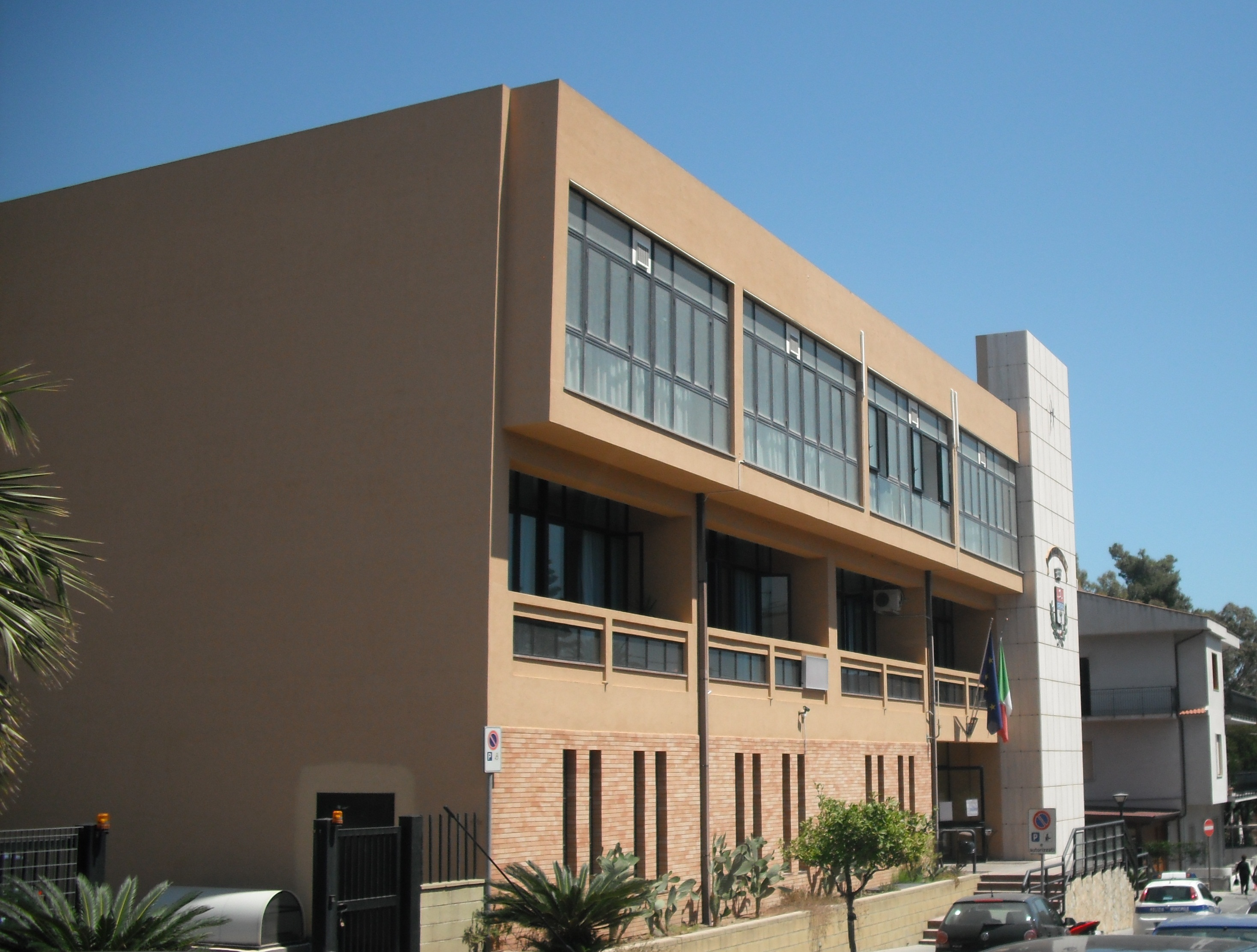
- Town hall

- Location within Italy Location within Sicily
- Coordinates: 38°10′N 15°16′E
- Country: Italy
- Region: Sicily
- Metropolitan city: Messina (ME)
- Frazioni: Archi, Cattafi, Corriolo, Olivarella

Government
  - Mayor: Pasquale Alibrandi

Area
  - Total: 9.8 km^{2} (3.8 sq mi)
- Elevation: 89 m (292 ft)

Population (31 January 2013)
  - Total: 7,291
  - Density: 740/km^{2} (1,900/sq mi)
- Demonym: Filippesi
- Time zone: UTC+1 (CET)
  - Summer (DST): UTC+2 (CEST)
- Postal code: 98044, 98040
- Dialing code: 090
- Website: Official website

San Filippo del Mela (Sicilian: San Filippu) is a comune (municipality) in the Metropolitan City of Messina in the Italian region Sicily, located about 170 kilometres (110 mi) east of Palermo and about 25 kilometres (16 mi) west of Messina.

San Filippo del Mela borders the following municipalities: Merì, Milazzo, Pace del Mela, Santa Lucia del Mela.

== Twin towns ==
- Castions di Strada, Italy

== People ==
- Giuseppe Basile (1886–1977)
