= Piero Carnabuci =

Italian actor (1893–1958)

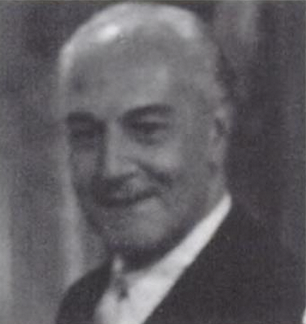
- Born: 6 September 1893; Santa Teresa di Riva, Italy
- Died: 13 February 1958 (aged 64); Milan, Italy
- Occupation: Actor

Piero Carnabuci (6 September 1893 – 13 February 1958) was an Italian stage and film actor.

== Life and career ==
Born in Santa Teresa di Riva, Messina, after the World War I Carnabuci decided to abandon his engineering studies at the University of Catania to pursue an acting career. He made his stage debut in 1920, with the company held by Luigi Chiarini and Olga Vittoria Gentilli, and almost immediately he became one of the most requested young actors in the Italian theatre of the time. Notably, between 1926 and 1928 he was first actor in the stage company of Luigi Pirandello, and between 1928 and 1929 he was first actor in the company of Sem Benelli. Carnabuci was also active in films, even if mainly cast in supporting roles. He died of coronary thrombosis in his house in Milan, aged 64, a few weeks after being struck by a severe bronchopneumonia.

== Selected filmography ==
- Kif Tebbi (1928)
- Creatures of the Night (1934)
- The Black Corsair (1937)
- Scipio Africanus: The Defeat of Hannibal (1937)
- The Sinner (1940)
- Princess Cinderella (1941)
- I Live as I Please (1942)
- The Gorgon (1942)
- The Jester's Supper (1942)
- The Whole City Sings (1945)
- The Mistress of Treves (1952)
- The Woman Who Invented Love (1952)
- Andrea Chénier (1955)
