= Merì =

- Comune
- Comune di Merì
- Location within Italy Location within Sicily
- Coordinates: 38°10′N 15°15′E
- Country: Italy
- Region: Sicily
- Metropolitan city: Messina (ME)

Government
  - Mayor: Filippo Gervasio Bonansinga

Area
  - Total: 1.9 km^{2} (0.73 sq mi)
- Elevation: 64 m (210 ft)

Population (31 January 2014)
  - Total: 2,412
  - Density: 1,300/km^{2} (3,300/sq mi)
- Demonym: Meriensi
- Time zone: UTC+1 (CET)
  - Summer (DST): UTC+2 (CEST)
- Postal code: 98040
- Dialing code: 090
- Website: Official website

Merì is a comune (municipality) in the Metropolitan City of Messina in the Italian region Sicily, located about 170 kilometres (110 mi) east of Palermo and about 25 kilometres (16 mi) west of Messina.

Merì borders the following municipalities: Barcellona Pozzo di Gotto, Milazzo, San Filippo del Mela, Santa Lucia del Mela.

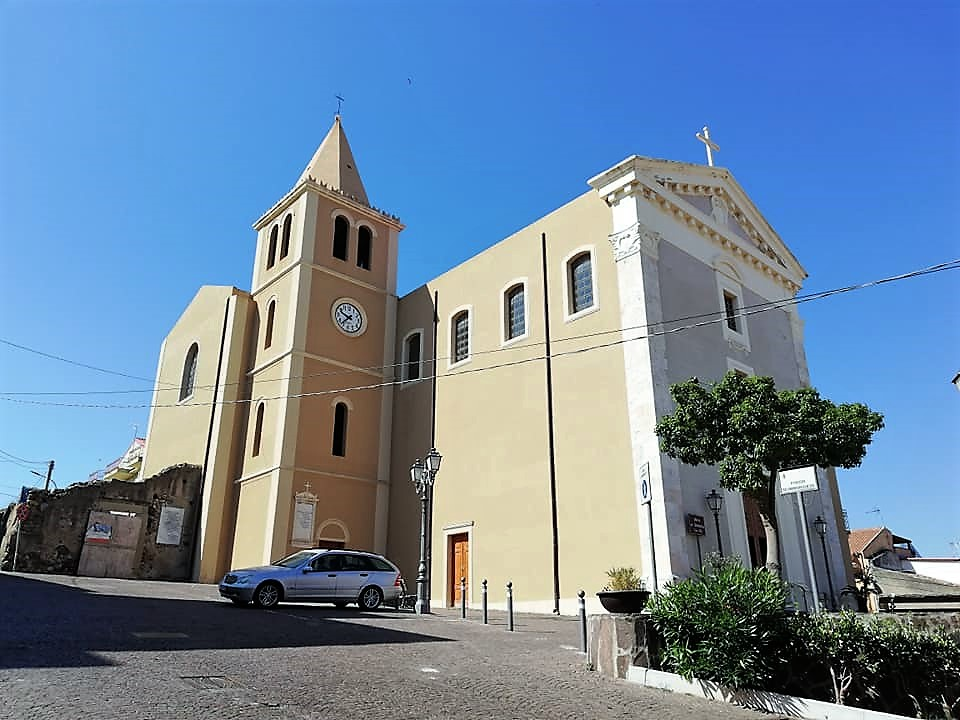
