= Sant'Alessio Siculo =

- Comune
- Comune di Sant'Alessio Siculo
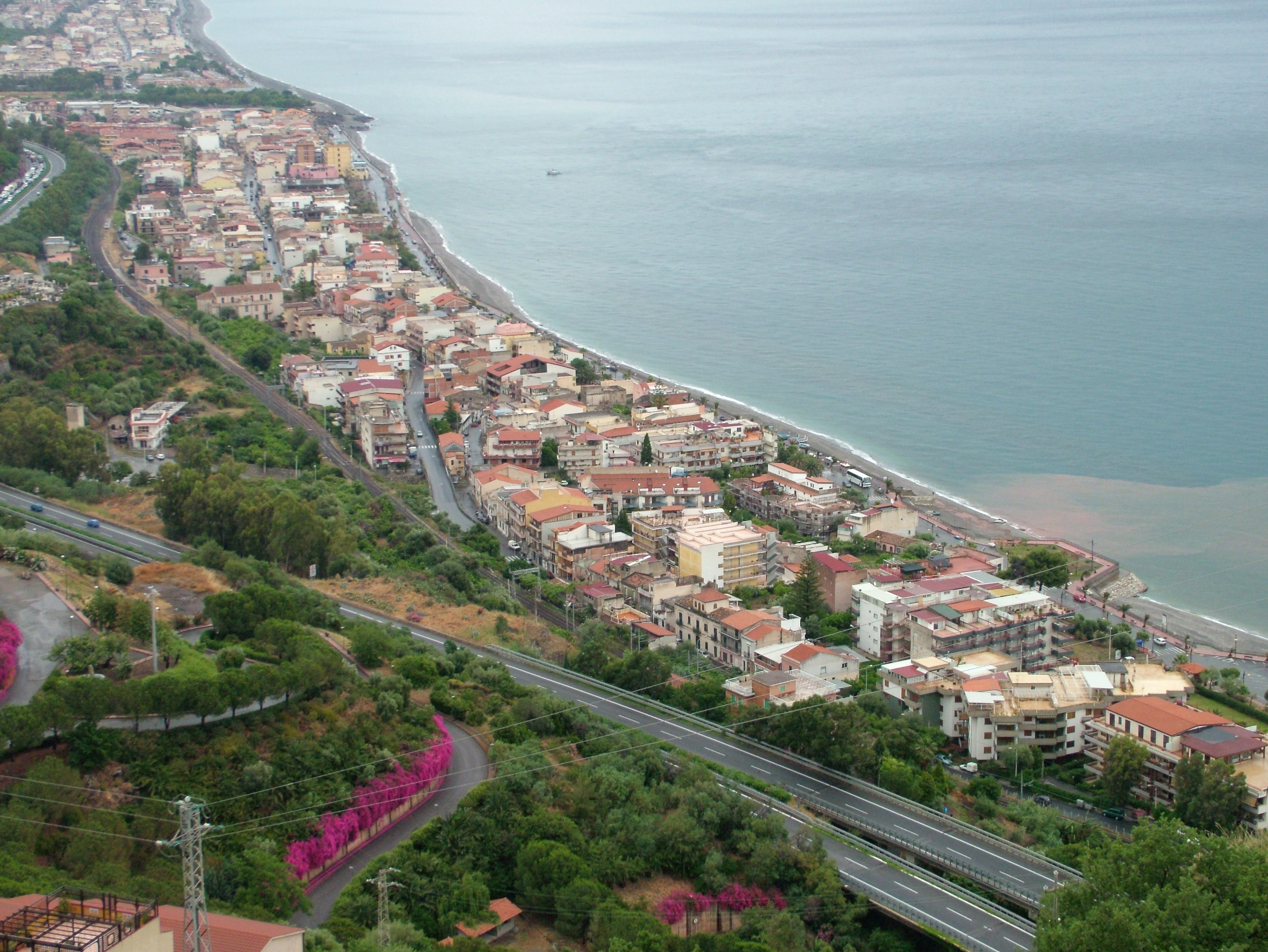

- Coat of arms

- Location within Italy Location within Sicily
- Coordinates: 37°55′N 15°21′E
- Country: Italy
- Region: Sicily
- Metropolitan city: Messina (ME)
- Frazioni: Lacco

Government
  - Mayor: Domenico Aliberti

Area
  - Total: 6.17 km^{2} (2.38 sq mi)
- Elevation: 15 m (49 ft)

Population (30 November 2021)
  - Total: 1,519
  - Density: 246/km^{2} (638/sq mi)
- Demonym: Santalessesi
- Time zone: UTC+1 (CET)
  - Summer (DST): UTC+2 (CEST)
- Postal code: 98030
- Dialing code: 0942
- Patron saint: Madonna del Carmine
- Saint day: July 16
- Website: Official website

Sant'Alessio Siculo (Sicilian: Sant'Alessiu Sìculu) is a comune (municipality) in the Metropolitan City of Messina in the Italian region Sicily, located about 180 kilometres (110 mi) east of Palermo and about 35 kilometres (22 mi) southwest of Messina.

Its main attraction is a castle built in the 11th century by the Byzantine emperor Alexios I Comnenos in his war against the Normans and the Arabs, who also held it. It sits on the promontory Capo Sant'Alessio overlooking the sea and beach.

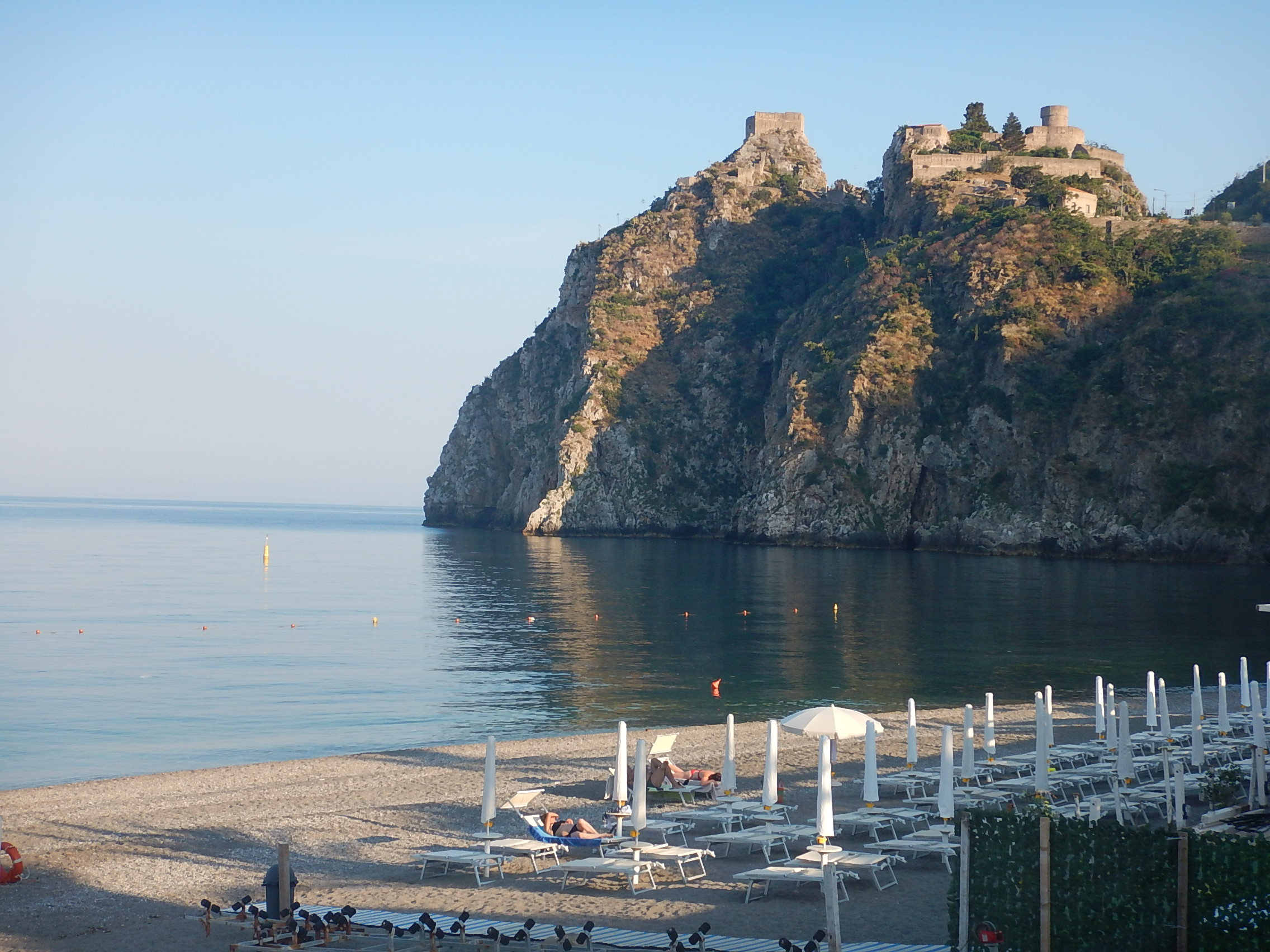
The castle.

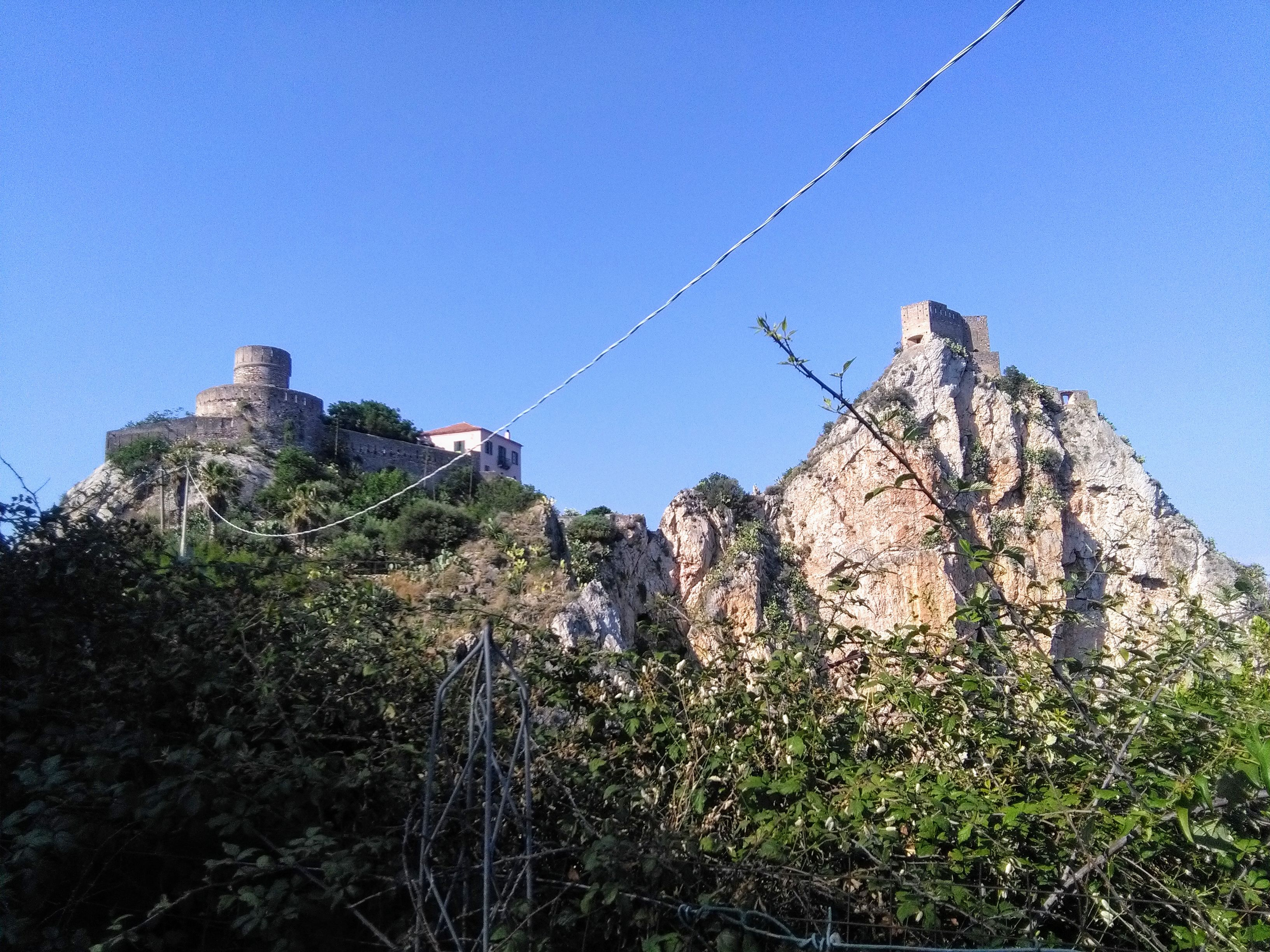
close-up of the 11th century Byzantine castle
