= Roccafiorita =

- Comune
- Comune di Roccafiorita
- Coat of arms

- Location within Italy Location within Sicily
- Coordinates: 37°55′N 15°16′E
- Country: Italy
- Region: Sicily
- Metropolitan city: Messina (ME)

Government
  - Mayor: Concetto Carmelo Orlando

Area
  - Total: 1.14 km^{2} (0.44 sq mi)
- Elevation: 723 m (2,372 ft)

Population (Dec. 2004)
  - Total: 261
  - Density: 229/km^{2} (593/sq mi)
- Demonym: Roccafioritani
- Time zone: UTC+1 (CET)
  - Summer (DST): UTC+2 (CEST)
- Postal code: 98030
- Dialing code: 0942
- Patron saint: St. Joseph
- Saint day: 19 March
- Website: Official website

Roccafiorita (Sicilian: Roccaciurita) is a comune (municipality) in the Province of Messina in the Italian region Sicily, located about 170 kilometres (110 mi) east of Palermo and about 35 kilometres (22 mi) southwest of Messina.
