= Casalvecchio Siculo =

- Comune
- Comune di Casalvecchio Siculo
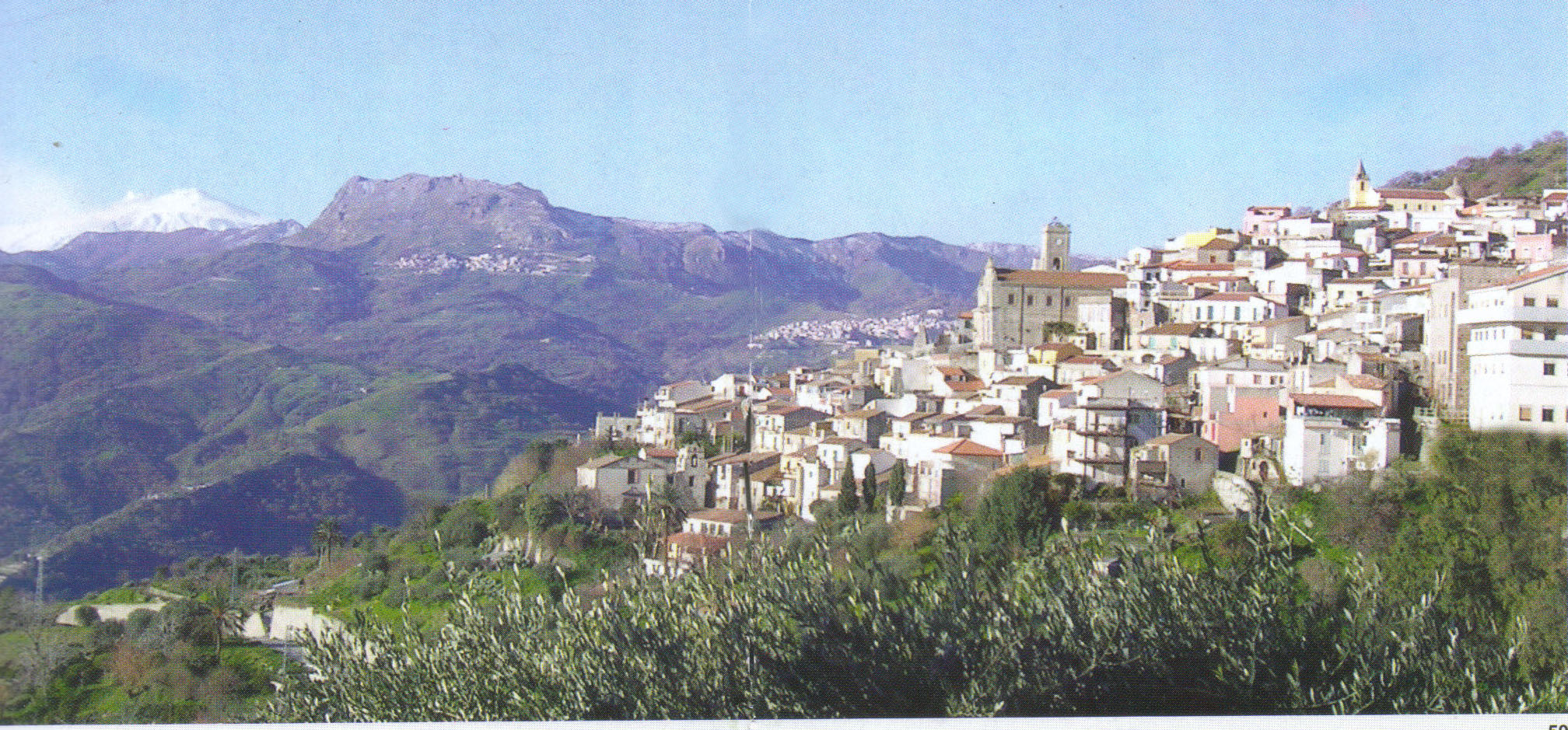

- Coat of arms

- Location within Italy Location within Sicily
- Coordinates: 37°57′N 15°19′E
- Country: Italy
- Region: Sicily
- Metropolitan city: Messina (ME)
- Frazioni: Contura, Fadarechi, Misitano, Mitta, Paratore, Passo Carrera, Pietrabianca, Pietrabianca Inferiore, Rafale, Rimiti, San Carlo, San Pietro

Government
  - Mayor: Marco Antonio Saetti

Area
  - Total: 33.4 km^{2} (12.9 sq mi)
- Elevation: 370 m (1,210 ft)

Population (30 November 2017)
  - Total: 797
  - Density: 23.9/km^{2} (61.8/sq mi)
- Demonym: Casalvetini
- Time zone: UTC+1 (CET)
  - Summer (DST): UTC+2 (CEST)
- Postal code: 98032
- Dialing code: 0942
- Website: Official website

Casalvecchio Siculo (Note: Sicilian: Casaluvecchiu) is a comune (municipality) in the Metropolitan City of Messina in the Italian region Sicily, located about 170 kilometres (110 mi) east of Palermo and about 35 kilometres (22 mi) southwest of Messina.

== Main sights ==
- Church of Santi Pietro e Paolo d'Agrò, one of the most important structures in the Agrò river valley and in the Metropolitan City of Messina. The current structure was built by Roger II of Sicily in 1117 and remade in 1172. It is characterized by a mix of Byzantine, Arab and Norman styles. The exterior appearance resembles that of a fortress, with two towers flanking the facade. The interior has a nave and two aisles.
- Mother church, also dating 1117 but totally rebuilt in the 17th century.
