= Mongiuffi Melia =

- Comune
- Comune di Mongiuffi Melia
- Coat of arms

- Location within Italy Location within Sicily
- Coordinates: 37°54′N 15°16′E
- Country: Italy
- Region: Sicily
- Metropolitan city: Messina (ME)

Government
  - Mayor: Rosario D'Amore

Area
  - Total: 24.3 km^{2} (9.4 sq mi)
- Elevation: 421 m (1,381 ft)

Population (30 November 2011)
  - Total: 659
  - Density: 27.1/km^{2} (70.2/sq mi)
- Demonym: Melioti
- Time zone: UTC+1 (CET)
  - Summer (DST): UTC+2 (CEST)
- Postal code: 98030
- Dialing code: 0942
- Patron saint: St. Sebastian
- Saint day: 20 January
- Website: Official website

Mongiuffi Melia (Sicilian: Mungiuffi) is a comune (municipality) in the Metropolitan City of Messina in the Italian region Sicily, located about 170 kilometres (110 mi) east of Palermo and about 40 kilometres (25 mi) southwest of Messina.
