= Argimusco =

High plateau in Sicily

Coordinates: 37.9880°N 15.0428°E

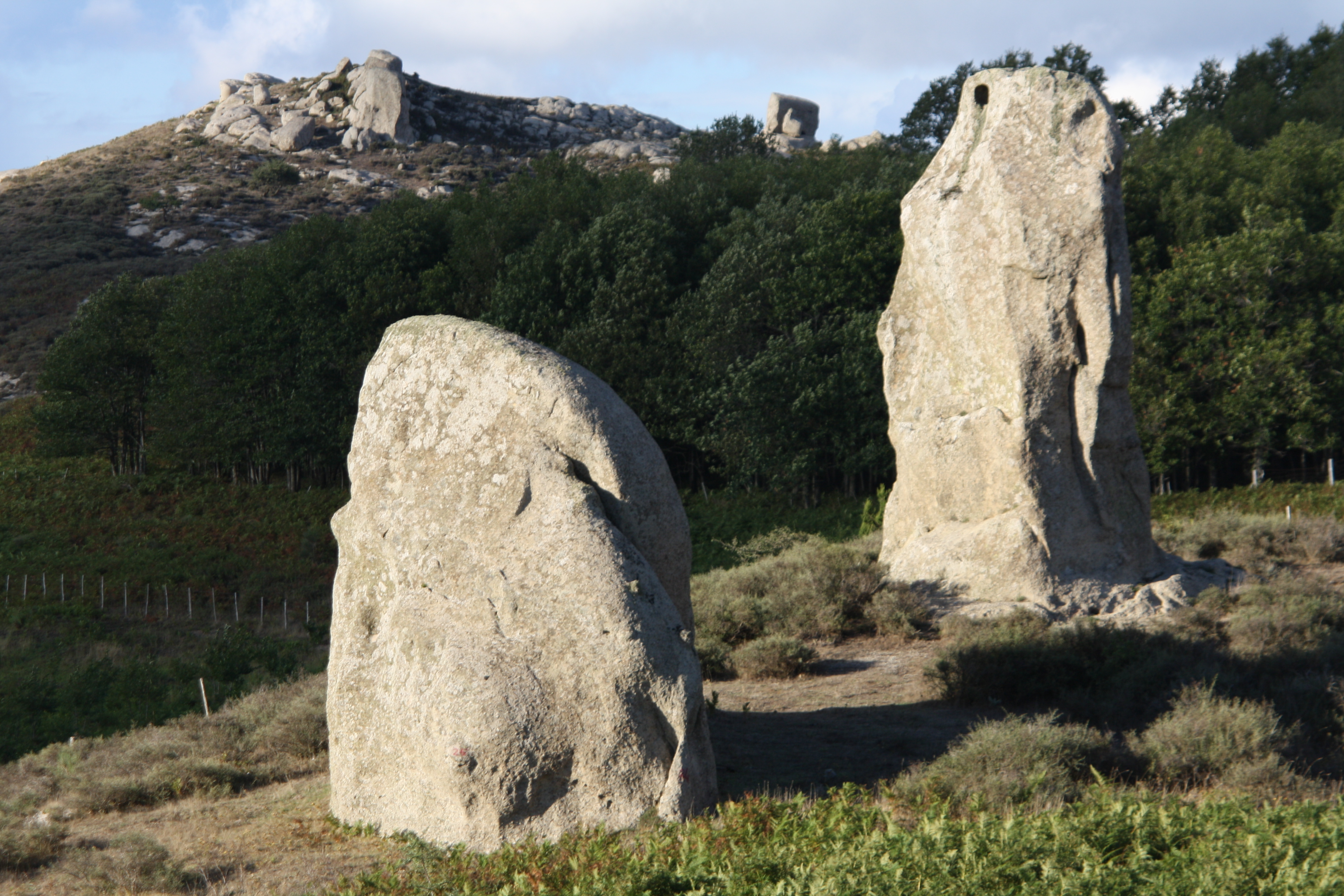
The "Pelican" and "Owl" alleged megaliths.

The Argimusco is a high plateau situated just north of Mount Etna in Sicily, Southern Italy, between the Nebrodi and Peloritani Mountains. It is located within the boundaries of the communes of Roccella Valdemone, Tripi, and Montalbano Elicona, the latter of which was constructed on the site of the prehistoric Abaca Enum. The location provides a comprehensive view of the Aeolian Islands, the Rocca Salvatesta and Montagna di Vernà mountains, cape Tindari, cape Calavà, and cape Milazzo.

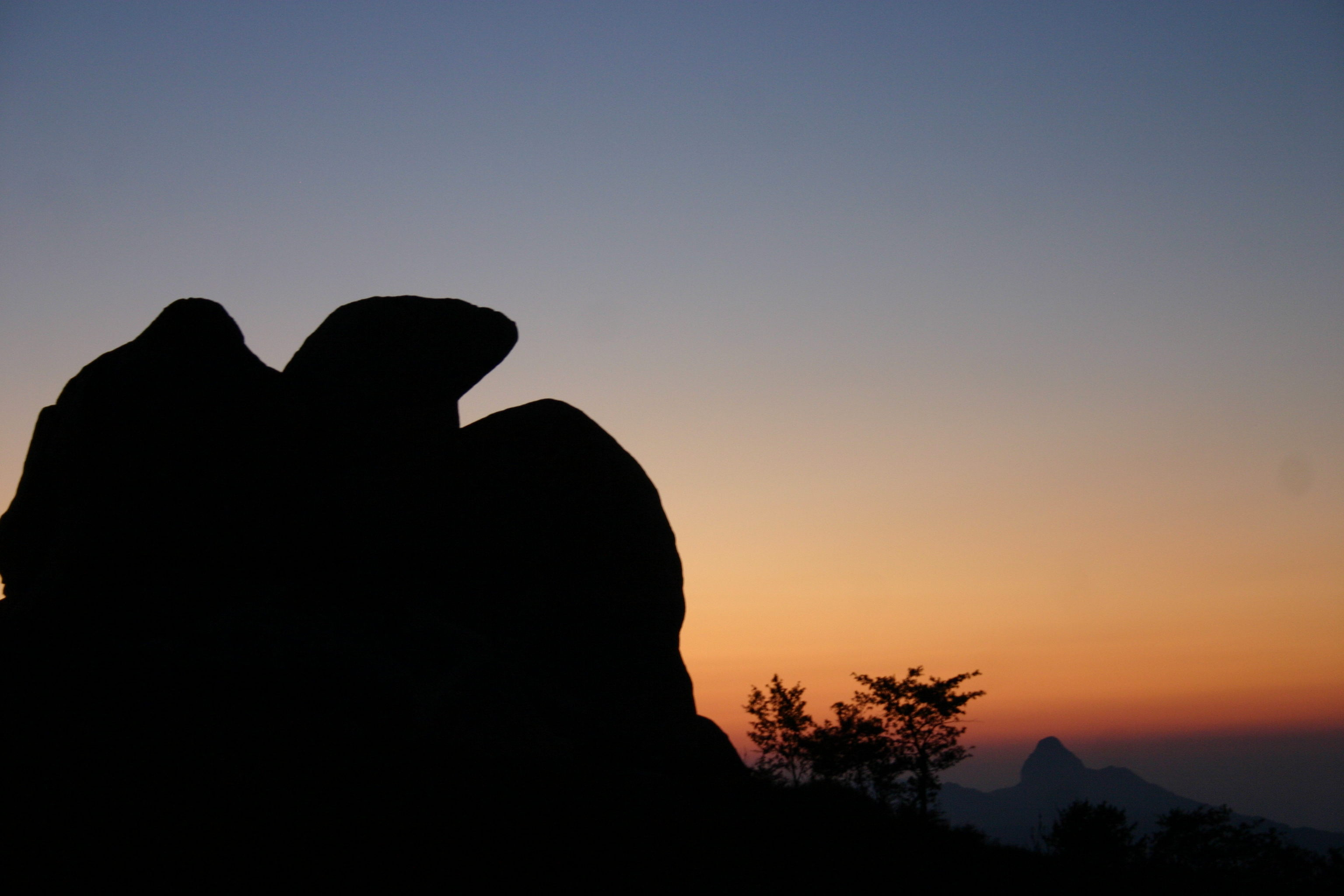
"The Eagle".

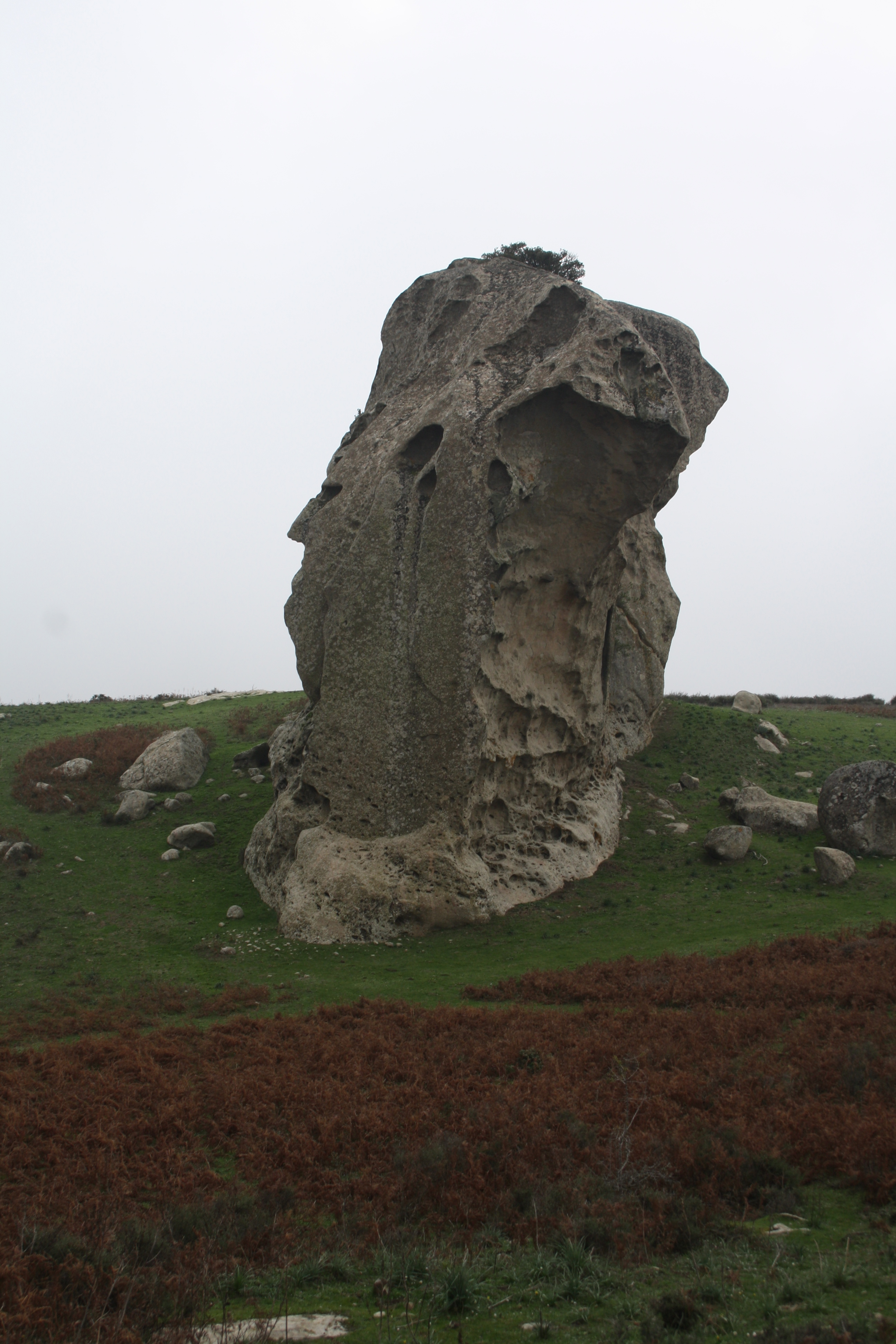
"Ophiuchus".

== Description ==
The site is located on the northern borders of the Bosco di Malabotta, over a thousand metres above sea level, with the Tyrrhenian Sea on side and the valley of the Alcantara river on the other. It includes a group of large quartz sandstone rocks, with unusual shapes, associated to animals or personas. According to local legend, the rocks are dolmens and menhir megaliths erected by a prehistoric population, although it is more likely that wind erosion created them.

Two sizable, elongated stones stand among the megaliths in Portella Cerasa, and another megalith bears an etched Sun symbol. A large boulder in front of the dolmen's remnants at Portella Zilla, further to the west, may have been a menhir that had collapsed. Around the alleged megaliths, no evidence of prehistoric human habitation, such as pottery, tools, or bones, have been discovered.

Examples of names for the stones are "Virgin in Prayer", "The Monk", "The Male Face" and "The Eagle".

== Sources ==
- Devins, Paul; Musco, Alessandro (2014). Argimusco Decoded.
- Devins, Paul (2011). La Scoperta di Argimusco.
- Devins, Paul (2010). Il Mistero dell'Argimusco.

== See also ==
- Pareidolia
