= Falcone, Sicily =

Falcone
- Comune
- Comune di Falcone
- Coat of arms

- Location within Italy Location within Sicily
- Coordinates: 38°7′N 15°5′E
- Country: Italy
- Region: Sicily
- Metropolitan city: Messina (ME)

Area
  - Total: 9.3 km^{2} (3.6 sq mi)
- Elevation: 3 m (9.8 ft)

Population (Dec. 2004)
  - Total: 2,927
  - Density: 310/km^{2} (820/sq mi)
- Time zone: UTC+1 (CET)
  - Summer (DST): UTC+2 (CEST)
- Postal code: 98060
- Dialing code: 0941

Falcone (Sicilian: Falcuni) is a comune (municipality) in the Province of Messina in the Italian region Sicily, located about 150 kilometres (93 mi) east of Palermo and about 40 kilometres (25 mi) west of Messina.

As of 31 December 2004, it had a population of 2,927 and an area of 9.3 square kilometres (3.6 mi^{2}).

== Physical Geography ==
Situated between Patti and Milazzo, the municipality of Falcone has the Tyrrhenian Sea to its north and the Rocca di Novara to its south. It borders the following municipalities: Furnari, Montalbano Elicona, Oliveri, and Tripi. The area hilly area to the north represents the border between the Nebrodi mountains and the Peloritani mountains while the plane to the south is where the settlement develops. The town of Falcone develops east-west along the SS113. The A20 has an exit at Falcone.

== History ==
There are no specific mentions of Falcone in antiquity, but a prehistoric necropolis near Contrada 'Giglione', highlights that the territory was inhabited in remote times. It is assumed, that just like the founding of the neighboring Oliveri, after the founding of Falcone occurred the city of Tindari was destroyed.

The area around Falcone used to be administratively controlled by Oliveri until 1857. In 1854, with around 200 inhabitants, it was meant to be passed under the control of Furnari but this was radically opposed by Basicò and so Falcone was to be made self-administrative by 1857 but would remain linked to Furnari until 1906, when the main church of the town was built in memory of Saint John the Baptist.

Until the first half of the 19th Century, most of the population had lived in a settlement, today called Belverde, further south and uphill. As the practice of fishing developed, the population began to occupy the flat part of the territory where the modern settlement now lies.

Falcone has been, on several occasions, hit by natural disasters of some importance. In the 1920s and again in the 1960s, problems with the embankment of the river Elicona, led to severe flooding. The earthquake of 1978 damaged part of the settlement and more flooding hit again in 2008. The latter hindered the local economy as tons of mud entered the settlement.

== Public transport ==
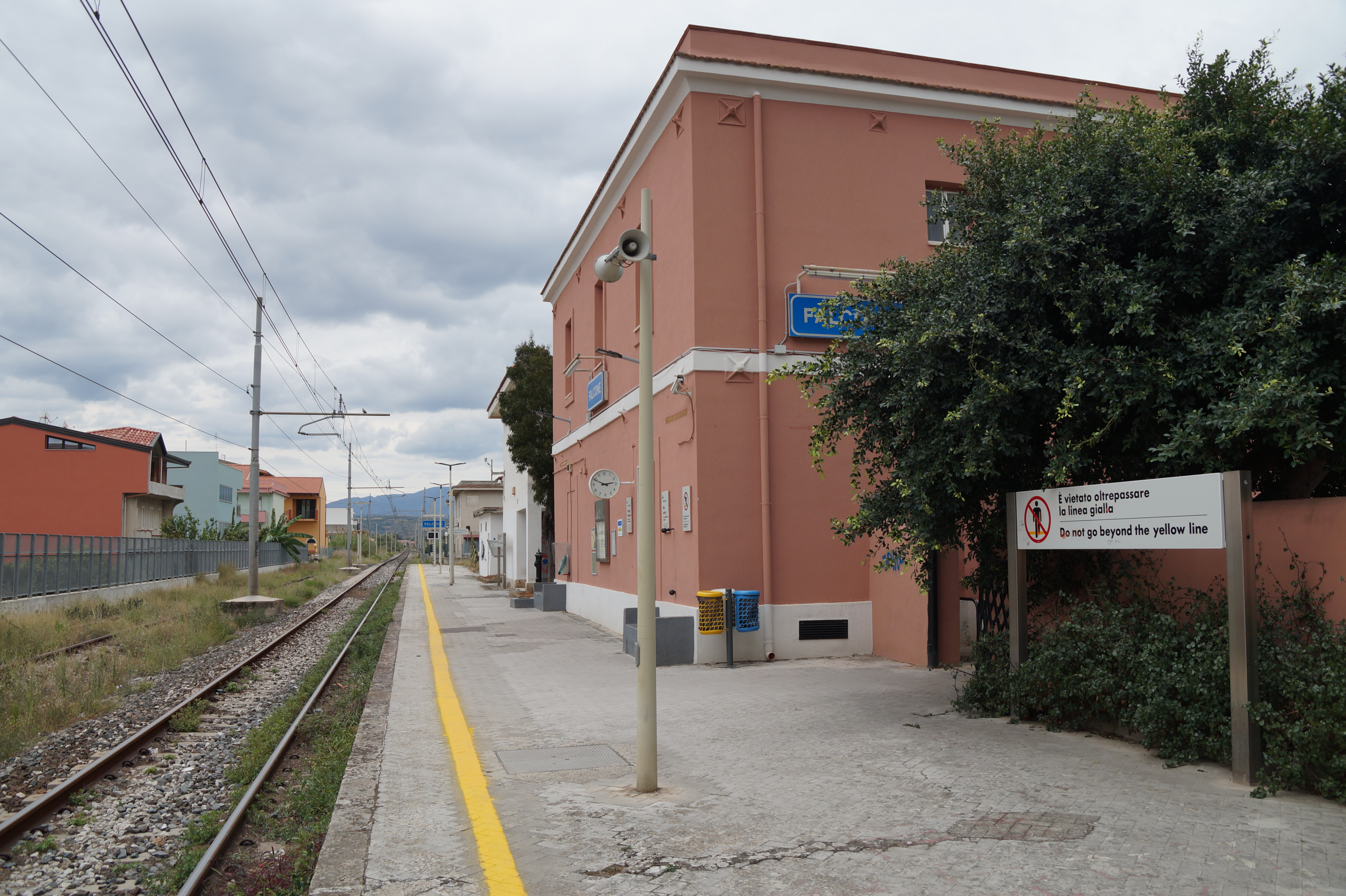
Falcone railway station

=== Railways ===
Falcone railway station is on the Palermo–Messina railway. It is served by trains run by Trenitalia, including services from Messina. Outside of the station is available an Uber service by app.

=== Bus and tram ===
Falcone is served by bus provided from Azienda Siciliana Trasporti.

== Demographic evolution ==
Historical population

Year	Pop.	±%
1861	1,005	—
1871	1,215	+20.9%
1881	1,398	+15.1%
1901	2,119	+51.6%
1911	2,283	+7.7%

Year	Pop.	±%
1921	2,774	+21.5%
1931	2,361	−14.9%
1936	2,514	+6.5%
1951	2,768	+10.1%
1961	2,709	−2.1%

Year	Pop.	±%
1971	2,163	−20.2%
1981	2,446	+13.1%
1991	2,856	+16.8%
2001	2,858	+0.1%

Source: Data from ISTAT
