= Montalbano Elicona =

Municipality in Sicily, Italy

- Comune
- Comune di Montalbano Elicona
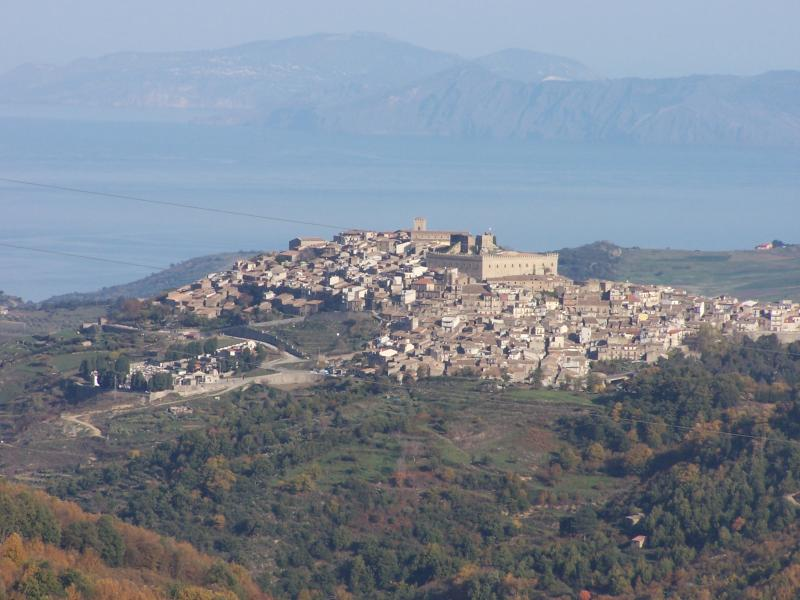
- Montalbano Elicona and the castle of Frederick II

- Coat of arms

- Location within Italy Location within Sicily
- Coordinates: 38°1′N 15°1′E
- Country: Italy
- Region: Sicily
- Metropolitan city: Messina (ME)
- Frazioni: Pellizzaro, Toscano, Santa Barbara, Villa Braidi, Santa Maria

Government
  - Mayor: Antonino Todaro

Area
  - Total: 67.4 km^{2} (26.0 sq mi)
- Elevation: 870 m (2,850 ft)

Population (31 October 2025)
  - Total: 2,098
  - Density: 31.1/km^{2} (80.6/sq mi)
- Demonym: Montalbanesi
- Time zone: UTC+1 (CET)
  - Summer (DST): UTC+2 (CEST)
- Postal code: 98065
- Dialing code: 0941
- Patron saint: Madonna della Provvidenza
- Saint day: 24 August
- Website: Official website

Montalbano Elicona (Sicilian: Muntarbanu) is a comune (municipality) in the Metropolitan City of Messina in the Italian region Sicily, located about 150 kilometres (93 mi) east of Palermo and about 50 kilometres (31 mi) southwest of Messina on the Nebrodi mountains at the border with the Peloritani range. It is one of I Borghi più belli d'Italia ("The most beautiful villages of Italy").

It is mainly known for the castle built in 1233 by the Emperor Frederick II, the medieval architecture of its streets, the megaliths of Argimusco, and the natural wood of Malabotta.

Montalbano Elicona borders the following municipalities: Basicò, Falcone, Floresta, Francavilla di Sicilia, Librizzi, Malvagna, Oliveri, Patti, Raccuja, Roccella Valdemone, San Piero Patti, Santa Domenica Vittoria, Tripi.

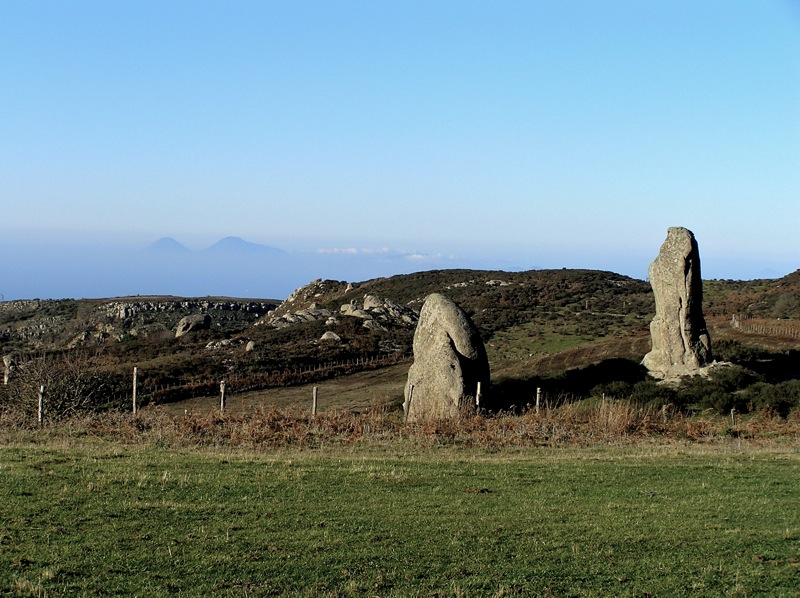
Menhirs in Argimusco.

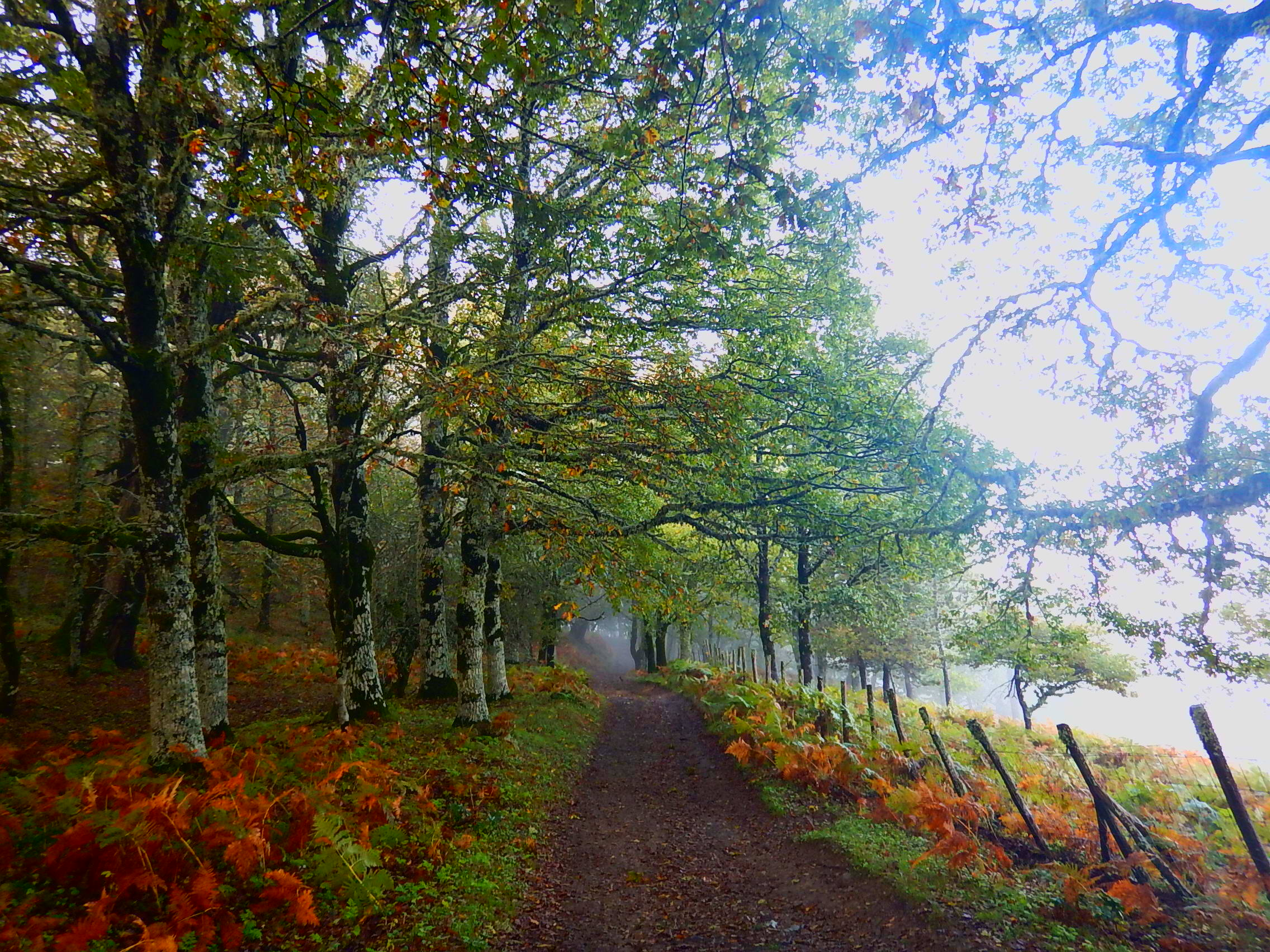
The wood of Malabotta.

== Public transport ==
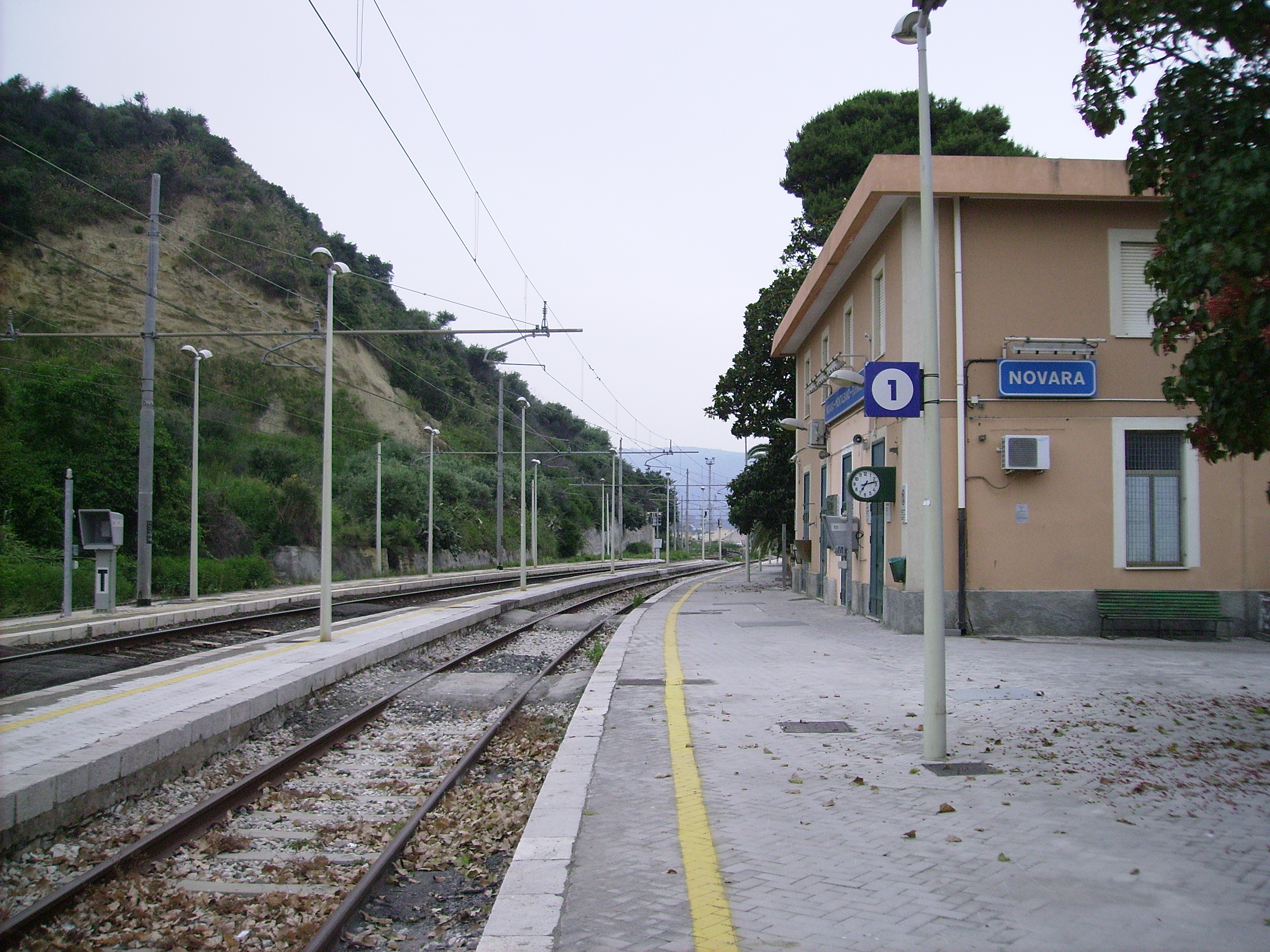
Novara-Montalbano-Furnari railway station

=== Railways ===
Montalbano Elicona is reachable by train:

- Falcone railway station is located 19,5 km away
- Novara-Montalbano-Furnari is located 23,8 km away.

Both are on the Palermo–Messina railway and they are served by trains run by Trenitalia, including services from Messina. Outside of the stations is available an Uber service by app.

=== Bus and tram ===
Montalbano Elicona is served by bus provided from Azienda Siciliana Trasporti.
