= Euplius of Catania =

Christian martyr and saint (died 304)

Saint Euplius
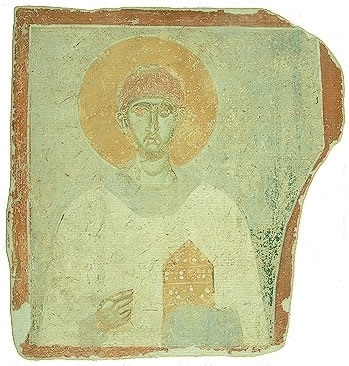
- Saint Euplius Fresco from Saint Nicholas Church in Melnik, Bulgaria, 12th - 13th Century
- Died: ~AD 304; Catania
- Venerated in: Eastern Orthodox Church Roman Catholic Church
- Major shrine: Trevico
- Feast: August 12 (Latin Rite Catholic), August 11 (Orthodox / Eastern Catholic)
- Patronage: Catania; Trevico; Francavilla di Sicilia

Euplius (Euplus) (Italian: Euplo, Euplio, Greek: Εὖπλος) (d. c. AD 304) is venerated as a martyr and saint by the Eastern Orthodox Church and the Catholic Church.

== Biography ==
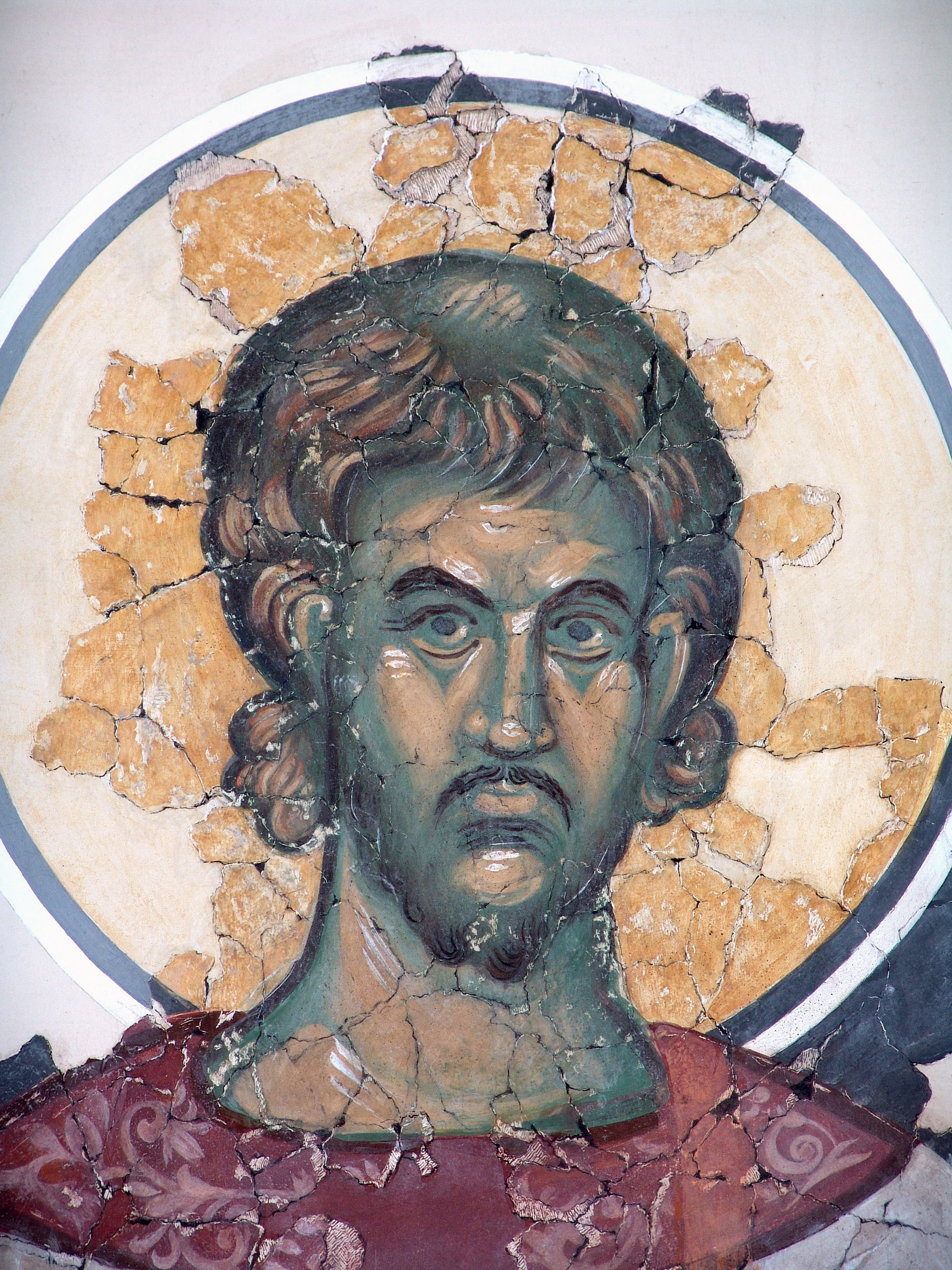
Saint Euplius Fresco from Transfiguration Church in Kovalyovo, Novgorod, Russia, 1380

His name in Greek means "good sailing" which is played upon in the text of the Orthodox Christian Vespers service in his honor.

The Passion of Saint Euplius states that he was a deacon and that he was arrested for owning and reading from a copy of the Bible during the Diocletianic Persecution. He was brought before the governor of the city, Calvinianus (Calvinian), who asked the saint to read him extracts from the book. He was then tortured and beheaded.

The remains of the Saint rest in the Cathedral of the Assumption of Trevico; it is plausible that they were brought just before the Arab invasion of Sicily in the 10th century. On 5 February 1654, the Bishop of Trevico, Donato Pascasio, authorized the translation of a bone of the saint in favor of the catanese diocese.

== Veneration ==
With Saint Agatha, he is a co-patron of Catania in Sicily. He is also the patron saint of Trevico and Francavilla di Sicilia. His feast day is on August 12 for the Catholic, August 11 for the Orthodox and Eastern Catholic.

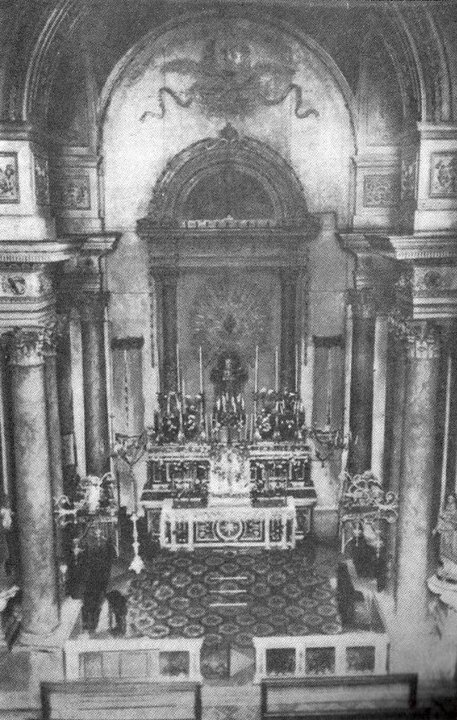
Interior of the Church of St Euplius in Catania before the bombing.

An ancient church, dating back to the 5th century, located in Catania near Piazza Stesicoro, was dedicated to him; various buildings stratified over the centuries, but during the World War II an american bombing reduced the new church, dating from the 18th century, to rubble. Today only the ancient crypt of the primitive church remains. This urban site coincides with the place of his martyrdom.

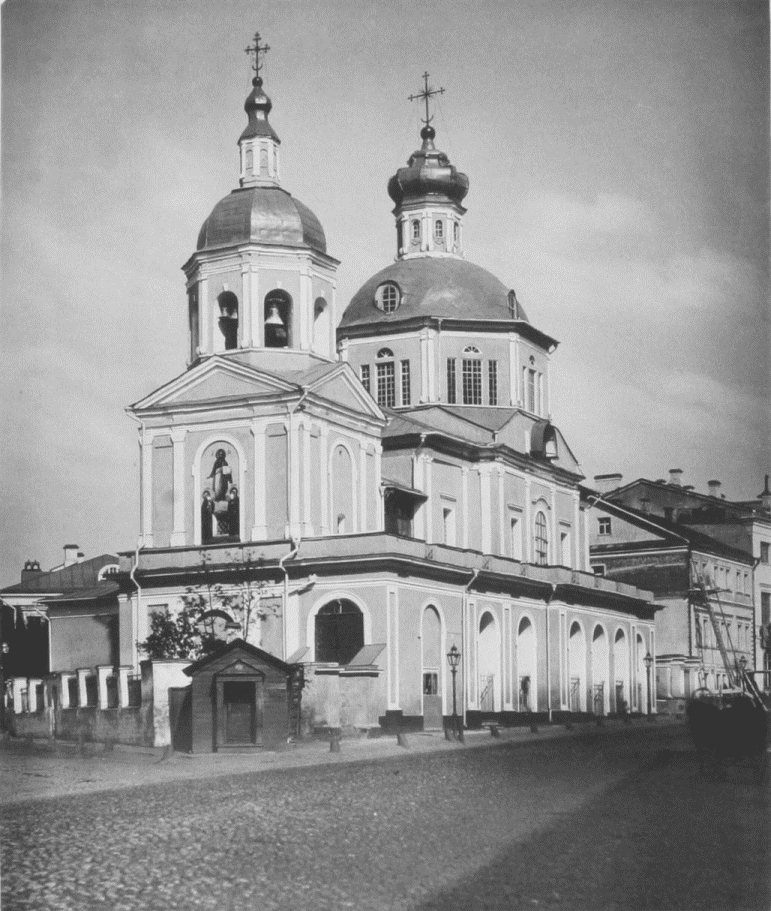
Church of St. Euplius the Archdeacon (1882)

Euplio of Catania was also the object of a devotion in Russia (as all the other saints). In 1471, a wooden church was erected in honor of the saint to celebrate the peace between Muscovite grand prince Ivan III and the Novgorod Republic. In 1657, Tsar Alexei I Romanov had the building rebuilt in stone. In the 18th century, on the occasion of a renovation, a majestic facade was erected. The Church of St. Euplius the Archdeacon, on what is now Myasnitskaya Street in Moscow, was demolished, on the orders of Joseph Stalin in 1926.
