= Francavilla di Sicilia =

- Comune
- Comune di Francavilla di Sicilia
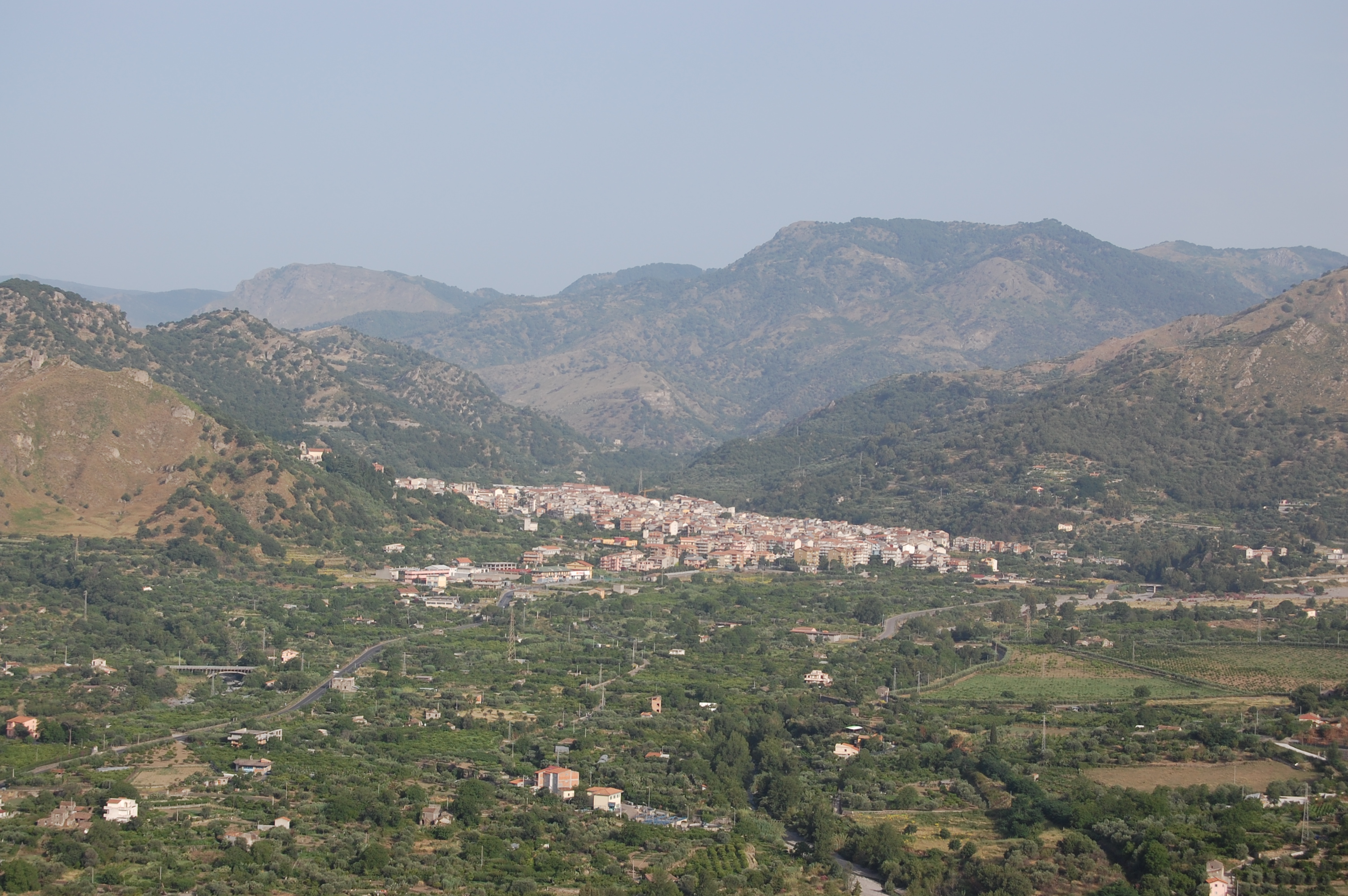
- Francavilla and the Alcantara Valley

- Location within Italy Location within Sicily
- Coordinates: 37°54′N 15°08′E
- Country: Italy
- Region: Sicily
- Metropolitan city: Messina (ME)

Government
  - Mayor: Pasquale Monea (since 2012)

Area
  - Total: 82 km^{2} (32 sq mi)
- Elevation: 330 m (1,080 ft)

Population (31 December 2014)
  - Total: 3,986
  - Density: 49/km^{2} (130/sq mi)
- Demonym: Francavillesi
- Time zone: UTC+1 (CET)
  - Summer (DST): UTC+2 (CEST)
- Postal code: 98034
- Dialing code: 0942
- Patron saint: Santa Barbara and Sant'Euplio di Catania
- Saint day: December 4 and last Sunday in August
- Website: Official website

Francavilla di Sicilia (Sicilian: Francavigghia) is a town and comune in the Metropolitan City of Messina on the island of Sicily, southern Italy.

It has a population of about 3,900 people and is situated in the southern part of the province, close to the northern slopes of Mount Etna. The distance to Messina is about 50 kilometres (31 mi), and the town is about 70 kilometres (43 mi) from Catania airport, in the valley of the River Alcantara between Taormina and Randazzo. Taormina and the Mediterranean Sea are about 15 kilometres (9 mi) to the southeast. Neighboring towns and villages include: Antillo, Castiglione di Sicilia, Fondachelli-Fantina, Malvagna, Montalbano Elicona, Motta Camastra, Novara di Sicilia and Tripi.

== History ==
In the vicinity of the town artefacts have been found dating back to the 5th century BC.

In 1092 the Abbey of San Salvatore di Placa was built, and the town grew around it.

On June 20, 1719 a major battle was fought between Spanish and Austrians in the War of the Quadruple Alliance, leaving 8000 dead and wounded.

== Main sights ==
- Gole dell'Alcantara, a canyon on the river Alcantara, which over the centuries found its way through the lava stones of Mount Etna and which flows close to the town. Between Francavilla and Motta Camastra it reaches its most remarkable point: a canyon, partly cave-like, about 50 metres (160 ft) deep and including characteristic lava rocks.
- Chiesa dell'Annunziata in the centre of the town.
- Convent of the Capuchins, near the cemetery.
- Ruins of the medieval castle on the hill above the town.
- Archaeological excavations, including ancient Greek findings from the 6th-century BC onwards.

== Events ==
- Last Sunday of August: Celebration of Saint Euplio.
- December 4: Celebration of the town's patron saint, Saint Barbara.
- Good Friday procession (every 4 years)
- Nativity Play
- Carnival

== People ==
- Gaetano Cipolla: American linguist, educator and author, principal of Legas Publishing
