= Malvagna =

- Comune
- Comune di Malvagna
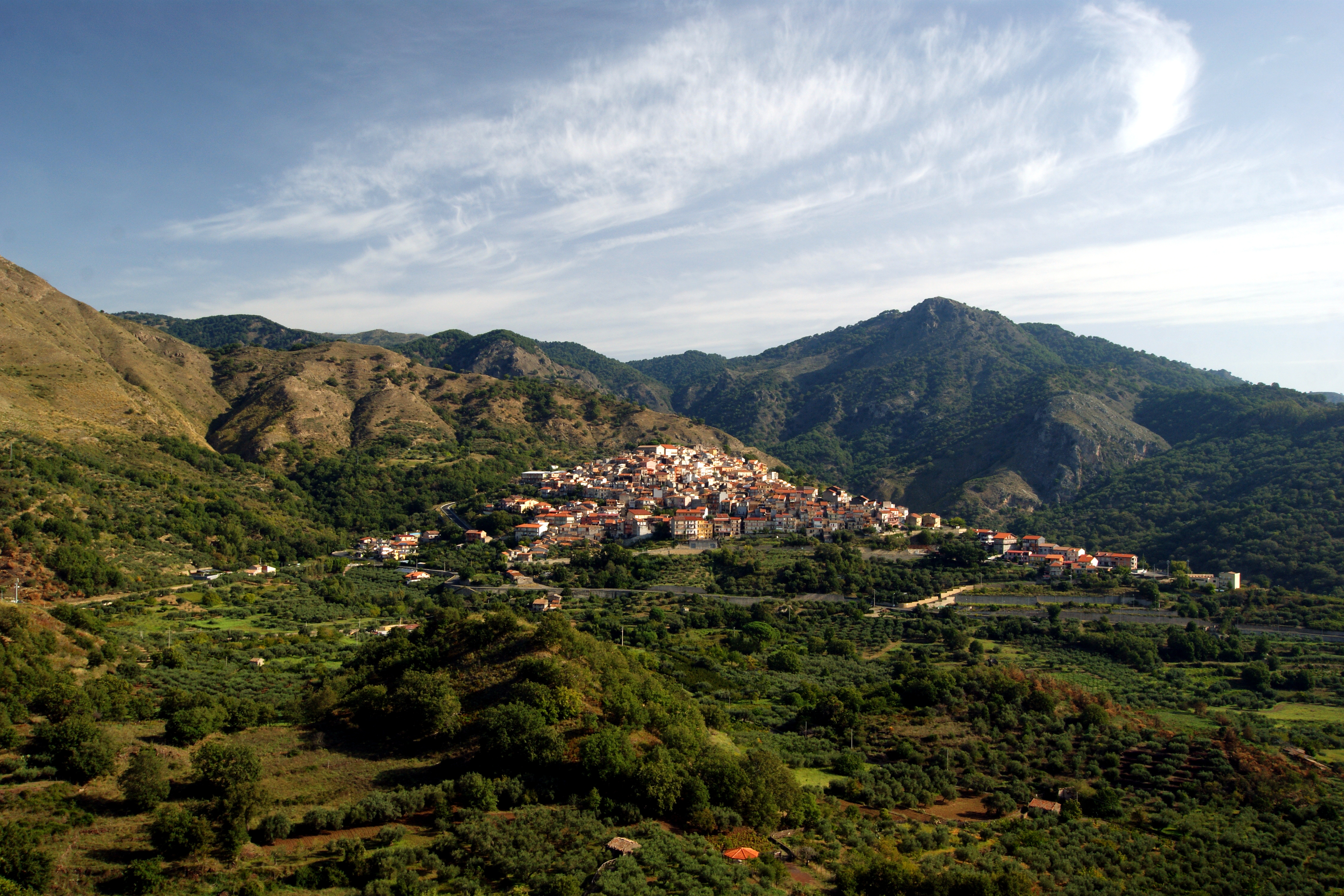

- Location within Italy Location within Sicily
- Coordinates: 37°55′N 15°3′E
- Country: Italy
- Region: Sicily
- Metropolitan city: Messina (ME)

Government
  - Mayor: Nino Panebianco

Area
  - Total: 6.9 km^{2} (2.7 sq mi)
- Elevation: 715 m (2,346 ft)

Population (30 November 2011)
  - Total: 814
  - Density: 120/km^{2} (310/sq mi)
- Demonym: Malvagnesi
- Time zone: UTC+1 (CET)
  - Summer (DST): UTC+2 (CEST)
- Postal code: 98030
- Dialing code: 0942
- Website: Official website

Malvagna (Sicilian: Marvagna) is a comune (municipality) in the Metropolitan City of Messina in the Italian region Sicily, located about 150 kilometres (93 mi) east of Palermo and about 50 kilometres (31 mi) southwest of Messina.

Malvagna borders the following municipalities: Castiglione di Sicilia, Francavilla di Sicilia, Mojo Alcantara, Montalbano Elicona, Roccella Valdemone. It is in the Alcantara river valley, between the Mount Etna and Monte Mojo.
