= Alcantara (river) =

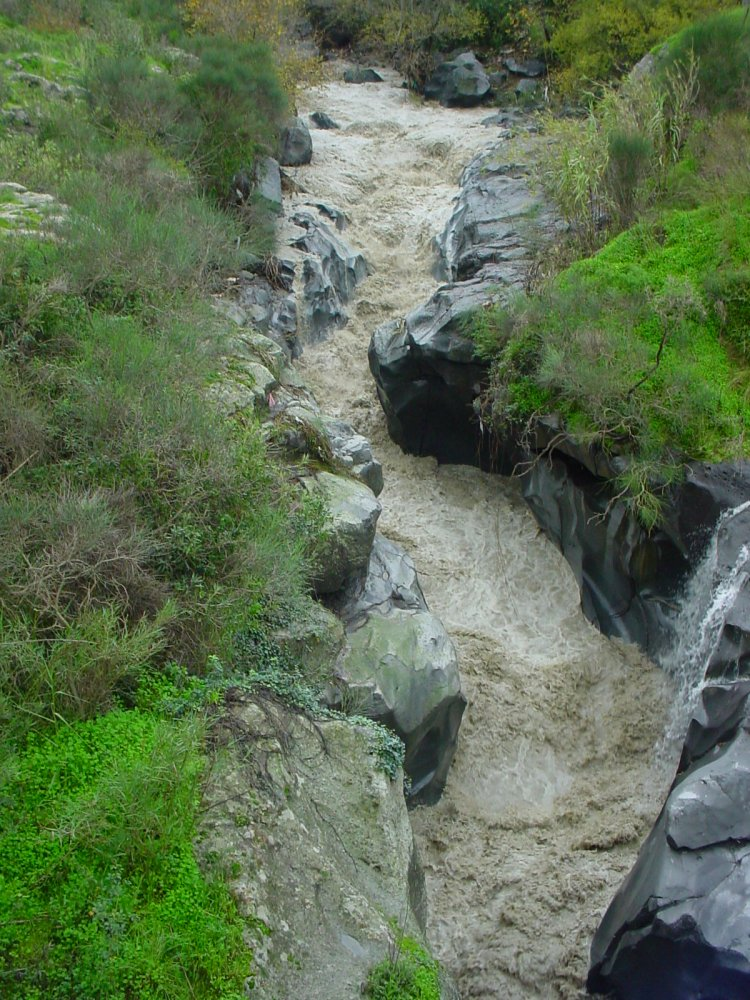
- The Alcantara during a 2003 flood

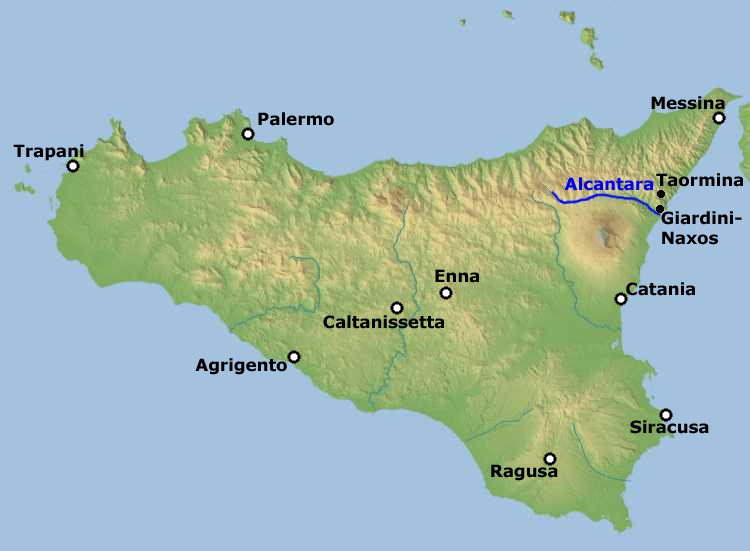
- Location of the Alcantara in Sicily
- Native name: Arcàntara (Sicilian); Càntara (Sicilian)

Location
- Country: Italy

Physical characteristics
- Source
  - location: Monti Nebrodi (Commune of Floresta, Province of Messina)
  - elevation: 1,500 m (4,900 ft)
- Mouth: Ionian Sea
  - location: Capo Schiso (Commune of Giardini-Naxos, Province of Messina)
  - coordinates: 37.8076°N 15.2575°E
- Length: 52 km (32 mi)
- Basin size: 573 km^{2} (221 mi^{2})
- Discharge
  - average: 2.41 m^{3}/s (85 cu ft/s)

The Alcantara (Italian: [alˈkantara]; Sicilian: Arcàntara or Càntara) is a river in Sicily, Southern Italy. It rises on the south side of Monti Nebrodi and empties into the Ionian Sea at Capo Schiso in Giardini-Naxos. The river is 52 kilometres (32 mi) long.

The name Alcantara is of Arabic origin (القنطرة, al-Qanṭarah, 'the Arch') and refers to a bridge from Roman times found by the Arabs. Thucydides called it Acesines (Ancient Greek: Ἀκεσίνης, romanized: Akesínēs) while its Latin names were Assinus, Assinos, Asines, Asinius, Onobala, Onobalas, and Acesines. Cantera was another hydronym for it, adopted by Normans. The river is mentioned by Thucydides on the occasion of the attack made on Naxos by the Messenians in 425 BCE.

== Course ==
The Alcantara has its source at an elevation of 1,250 metres (4,100 ft) in the municipality of Floresta. On its way to the sea, past the north of Mount Etna, it flows through the municipalities of Randazzo, Mojo Alcantara, Francavilla di Sicilia, Motta Camastra, Castiglione di Sicilia, Graniti, Gaggi, Calatabiano, Taormina and Giardini-Naxos.

Several thousand years ago, the river bed was blocked by a lava flow from Mount Etna. As the lava was cooled much more quickly by the water than it would have done otherwise, it crystallised in the form of columns. Over the next millennia, the river naturally eroded a channel through these columns, resulting in impressive gorges and ravines, such as the Alcantara Gorges (Gole dell'Alcantara) next to Francavilla di Sicilia, where the Peloritani mountains end.

== Park ==
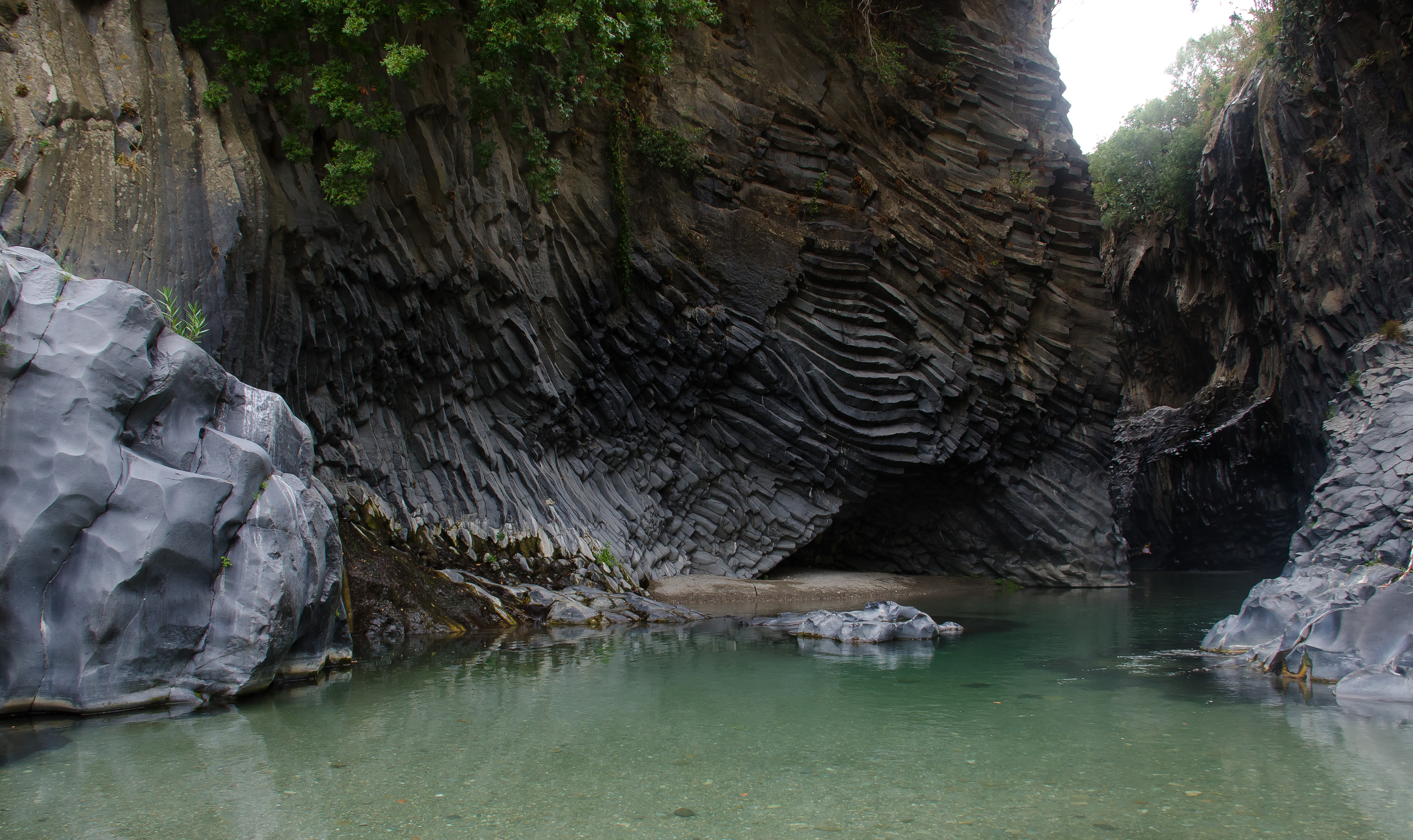
Gole dell'Alcantara (Alcantara Gorges)

The Alcantara River Park (Parco fluviale dell'Alcantara) was established in 2001 for the protection of the river, and to encourage its use as a relaxation area and tourist destination. The columns and surroundings can be seen in the segment "The Enchanted Doe" of the 2015 film Tale of Tales.

== Tributaries ==
- Flascio
- San Paolo
- Favoscuro
- Fondachello
- Roccella
- Petrolo
