= Santa Domenica Vittoria =

- Comune
- Comune di Santa Domenica Vittoria
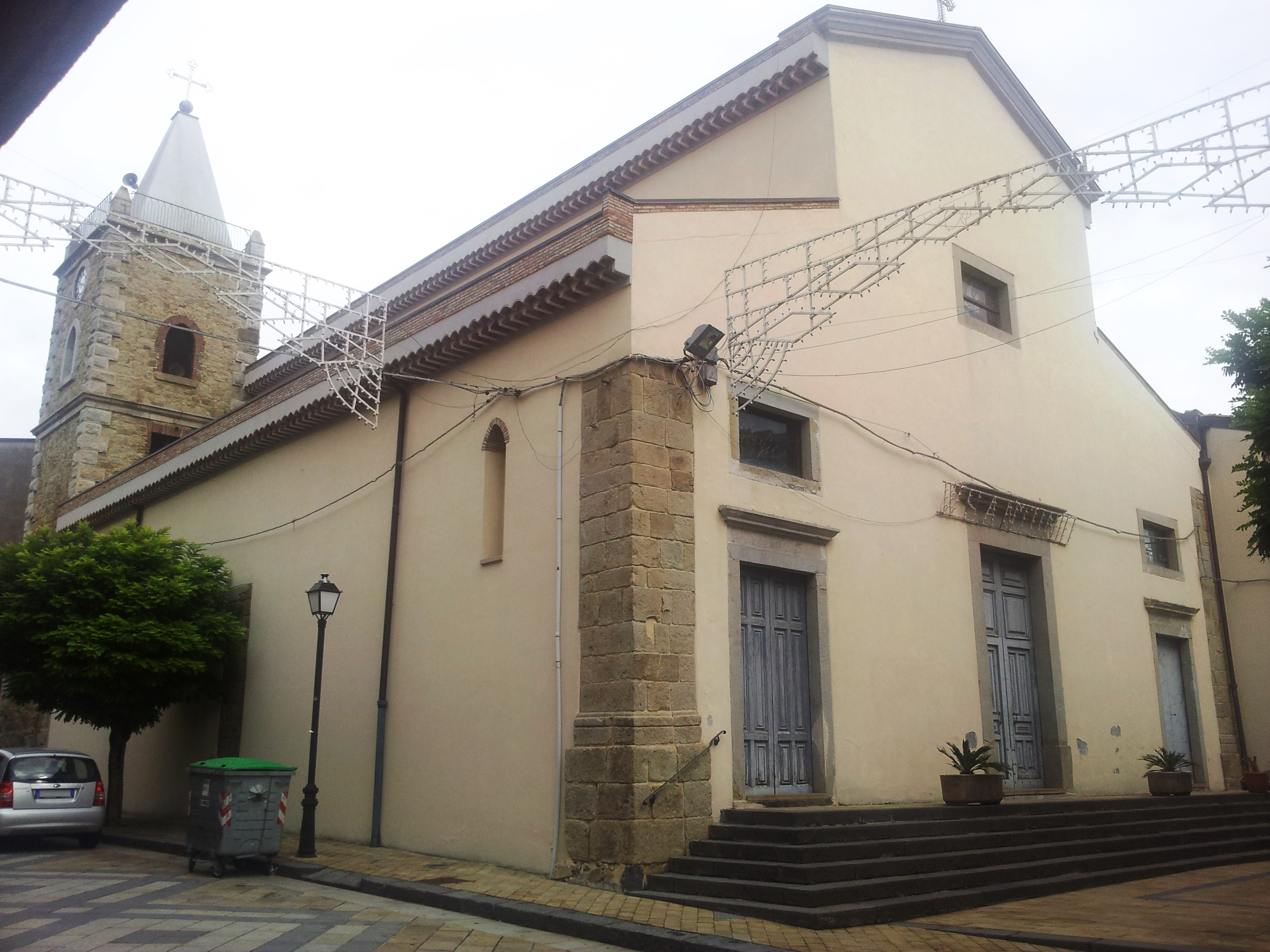
- Mother Church

- Location within Italy Location within Sicily
- Coordinates: 37°55′N 14°58′E
- Country: Italy
- Region: Sicily
- Metropolitan city: Messina (ME)

Government
  - Mayor: Nunzio Spartà

Area
  - Total: 19 km^{2} (7.3 sq mi)
- Elevation: 1,080 m (3,540 ft)

Population (31 December 2021)
  - Total: 873
  - Density: 46/km^{2} (120/sq mi)
- Time zone: UTC+1 (CET)
  - Summer (DST): UTC+2 (CEST)
- Postal code: 98030
- Dialing code: 095
- Patron saint: St. Antonio Abate
- Website: Official Website

Santa Domenica Vittoria (Sicilian: Santa Dumìnica) is a town and comune in the Metropolitan City of Messina, Sicily, southern Italy. It is situated 7 kilometres (4 mi) north of Randazzo in the Nebrodi Mountains Range. It is 1,080 metres (3,540 ft) above sea level and has views over all of the northern Etna Valley. Although the town is in the Metropolitan City of Messina it takes the telephone prefix for the Metropolitan City of Catania as it is on the border between the two entities.

The comune borders the following municipalities: Floresta, Montalbano Elicona, Randazzo, and Roccella Valdemone.

Santa Domenica Vittoria is named after a Calabrian saint, who was a victim of the Roman persecution of Christians under Diocletian.

== Festival ==
Feast of St. Anthony

The main folklore event in the town is the Feast of St. Anthony, the town's patron. The actual feast day is 17 January, but given the cold winters that are usually accompanied by heavy snow and below freezing conditions, it is celebrated on the first Sunday of September.

Before the day of celebrations there are seven days of prayer in the local church. On the day of the feast many of the men of the town dress in white and carry a statue of St Anthony in a procession through every street of town and the townspeople traditionally pin money to the statue as it passes by their balconies. The day ends with a fireworks display and a party in the town's main piazza.

== Gallery ==
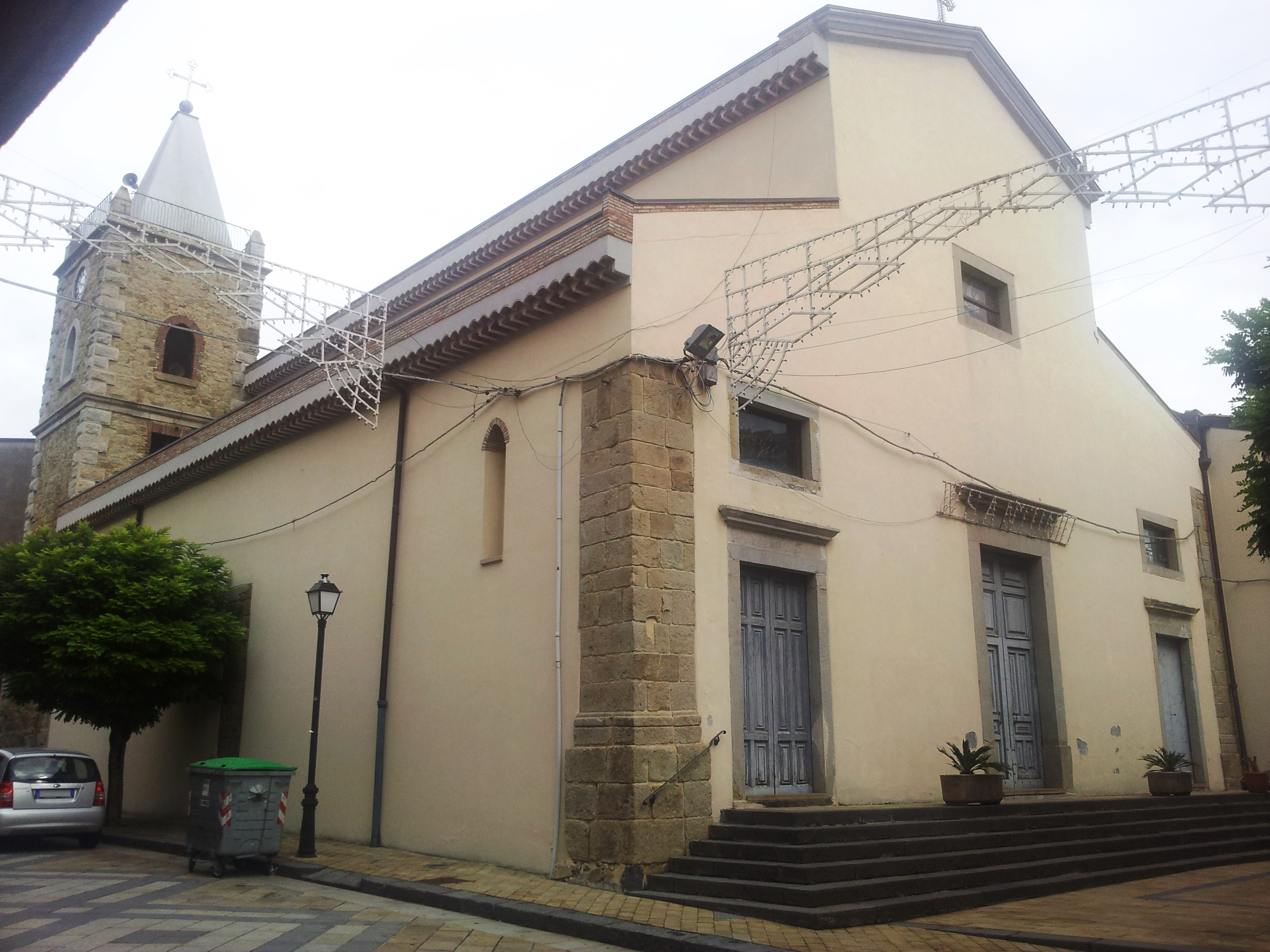
Mother Church in Santa Domenica Vittoria.

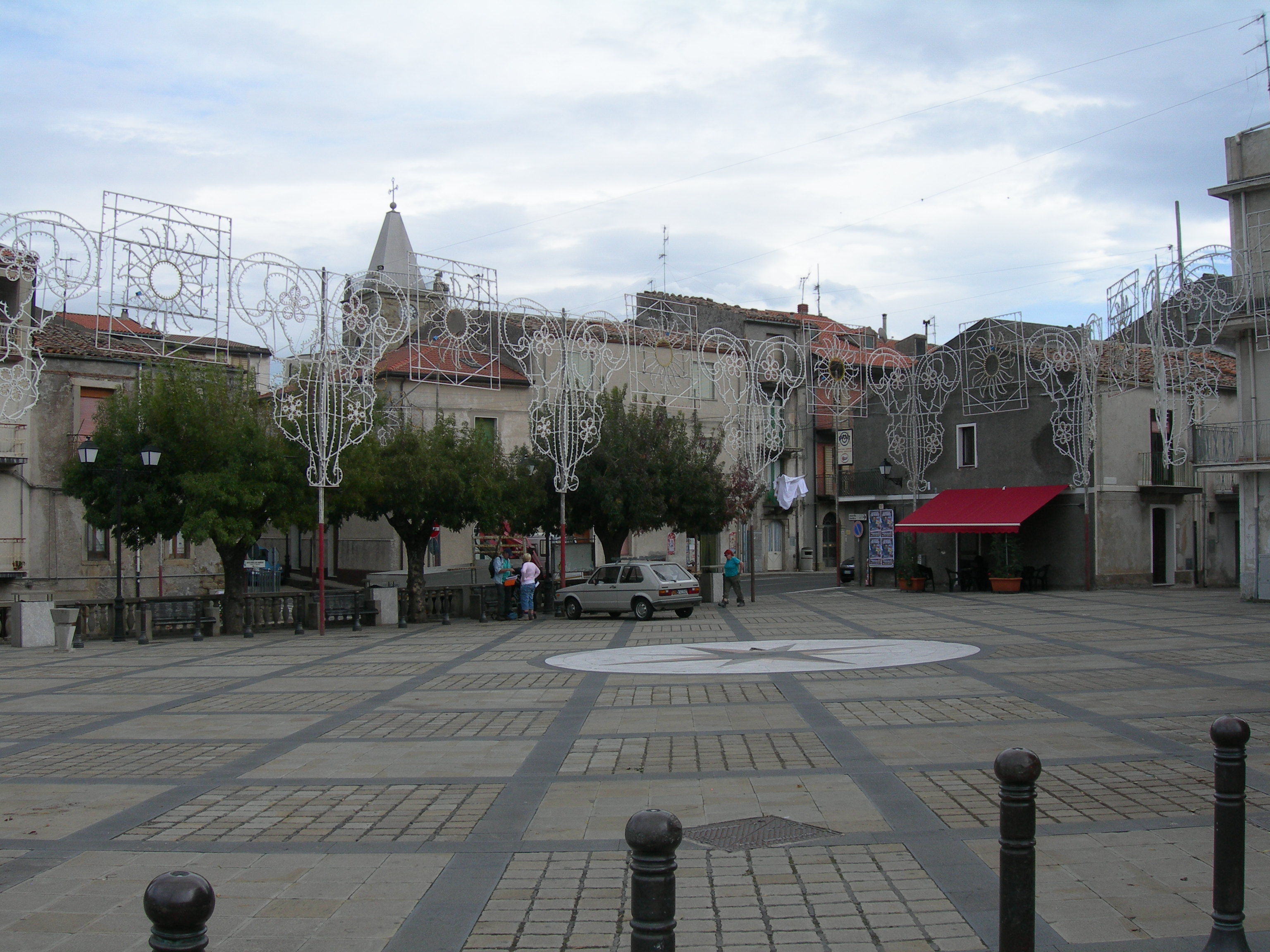
Piazza del Duomo, in Santa Domenica Vittoria.

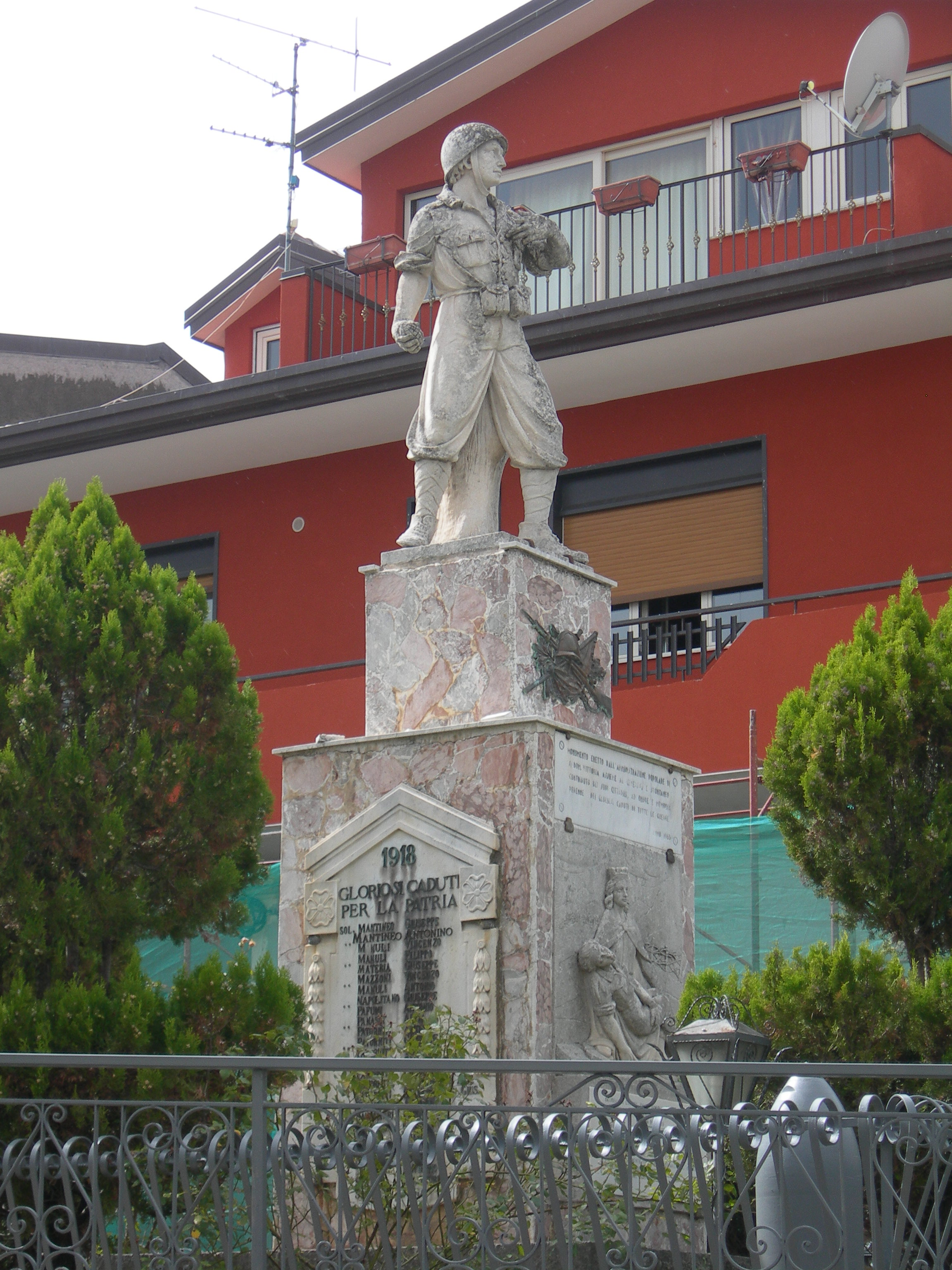
War memorial in Santa Domenica Vittoria.

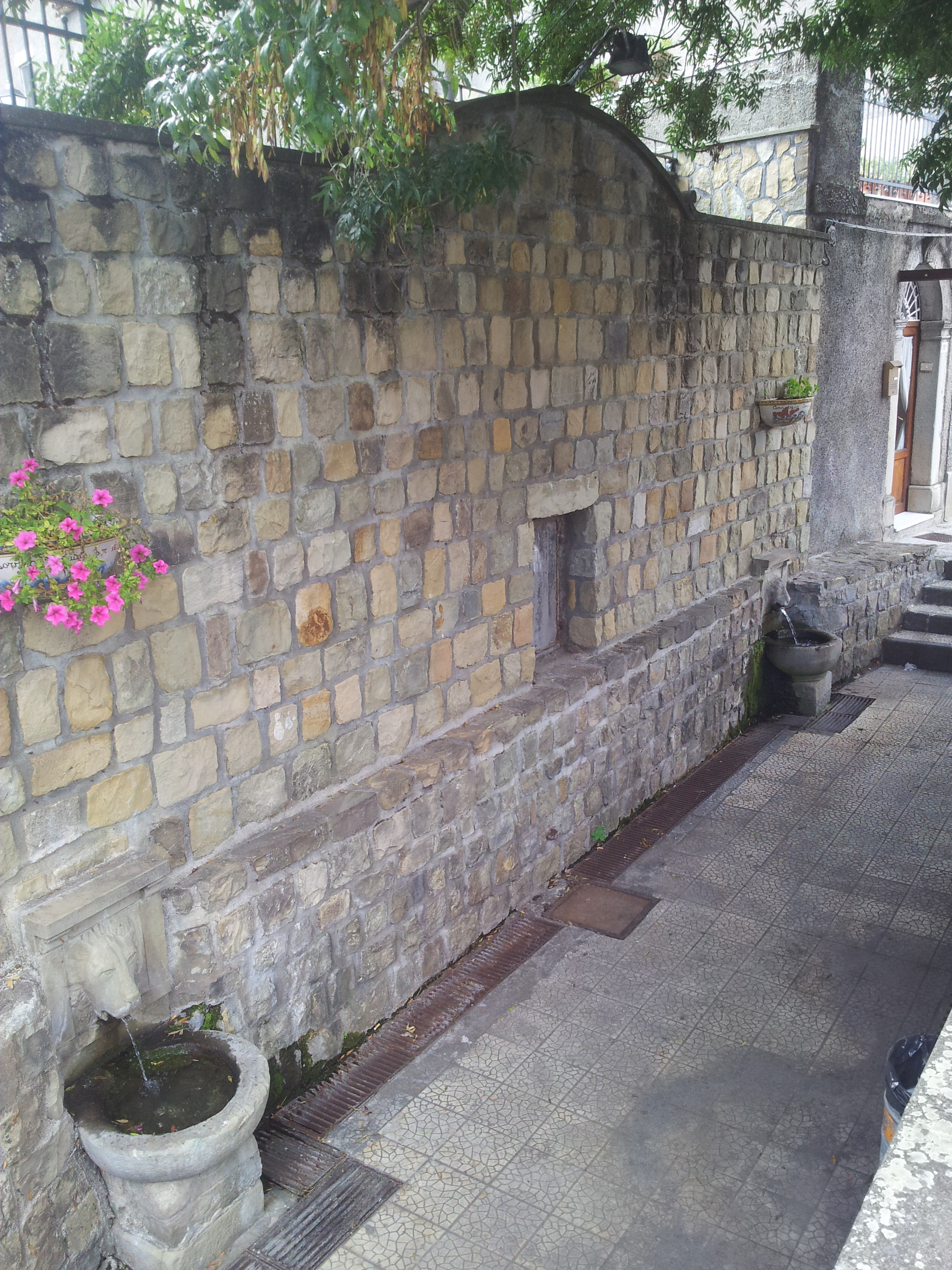
The ancient drinking trough of Santa Domenica Vittoria.

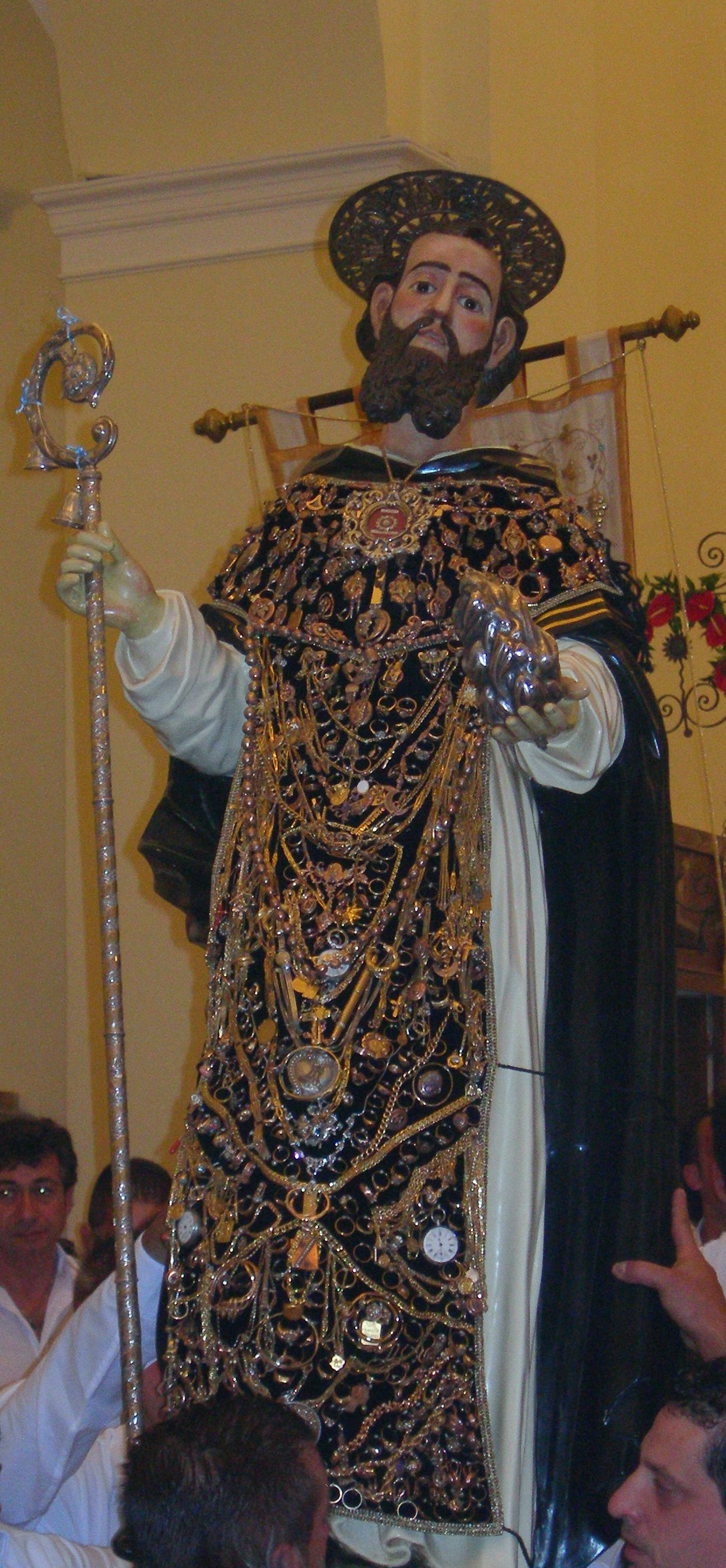
S. Anthony Abbot set up for the party in Mother Church.

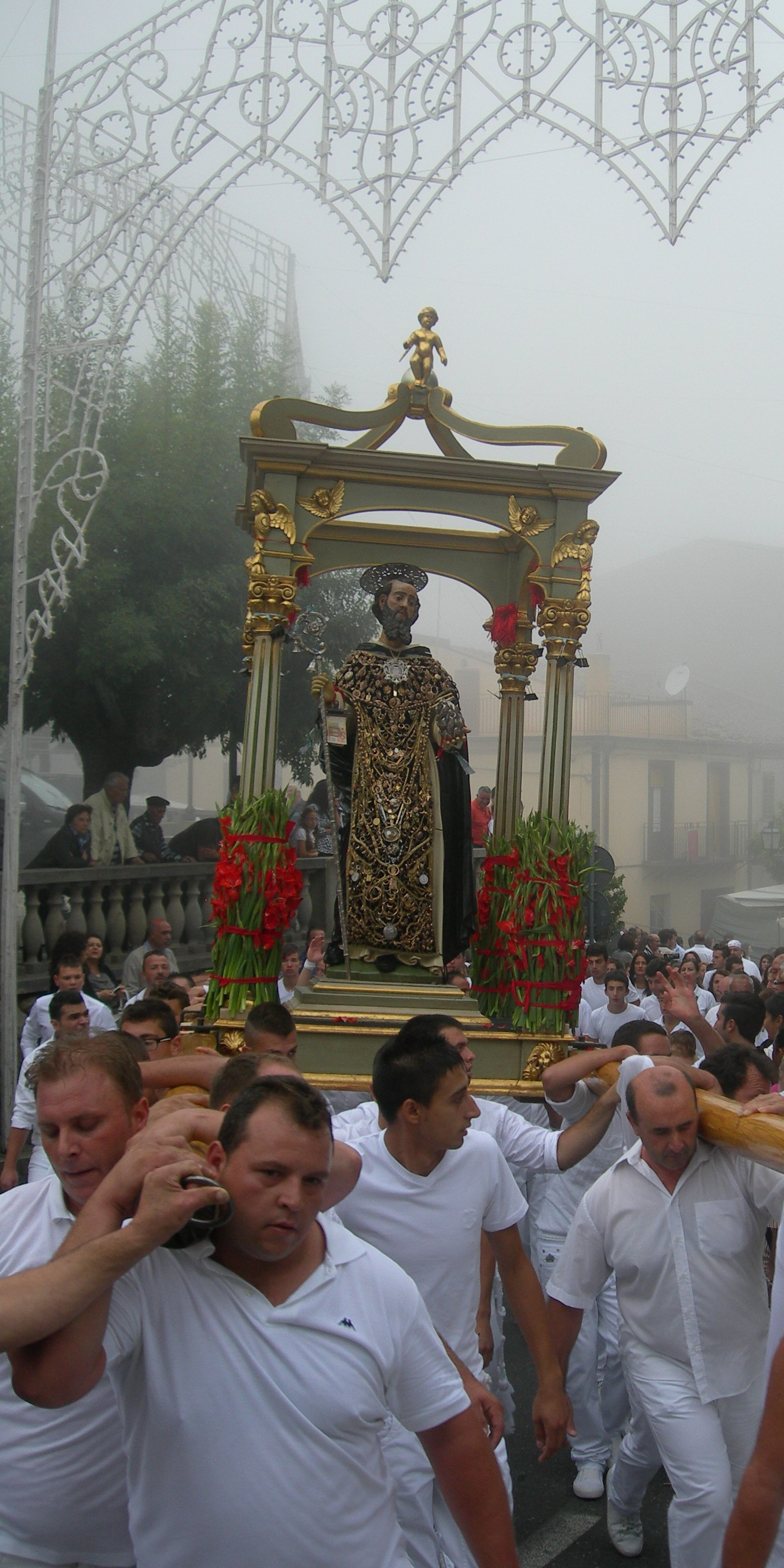
S. Anthony Abbot set up for the party on the street.

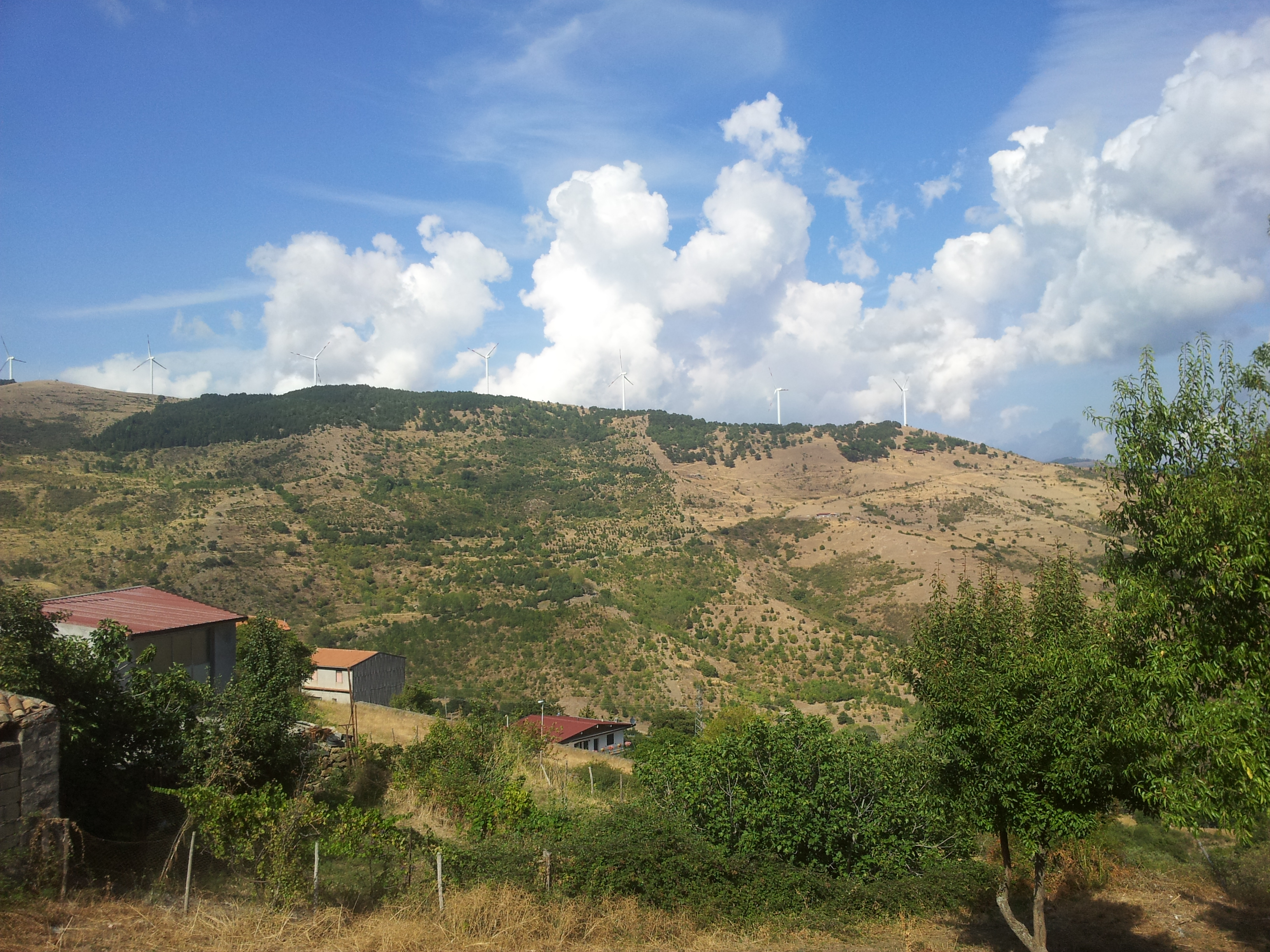
Wind turbines of Santa Domenica Vittoria.
