= Basicò =

Basicò Vasilikòn (Greek)
- Comune
- Comune di Basicò
- Location within Italy Location within Sicily
- Coordinates: 38°4′N 15°4′E
- Country: Italy
- Region: Sicily
- Metropolitan city: Messina (ME)

Government
  - Mayor: Antonio Filippo Casimo

Area
  - Total: 12.0 km^{2} (4.6 sq mi)
- Elevation: 520 m (1,710 ft)

Population (30 November 2011)
  - Total: 676
  - Density: 56.3/km^{2} (146/sq mi)
- Demonym: Basicotani
- Time zone: UTC+1 (CET)
  - Summer (DST): UTC+2 (CEST)
- Postal code: 98060
- Dialing code: 0941
- Website: Official website

Basicò is a comune (municipality) in the Metropolitan City of Messina in the Italian region Sicily, located about 150 kilometres (93 mi) east of Palermo and about 45 kilometres (28 mi) southwest of Messina.

Basicò borders the following municipalities: Montalbano Elicona, Tripi.

== Public transport ==
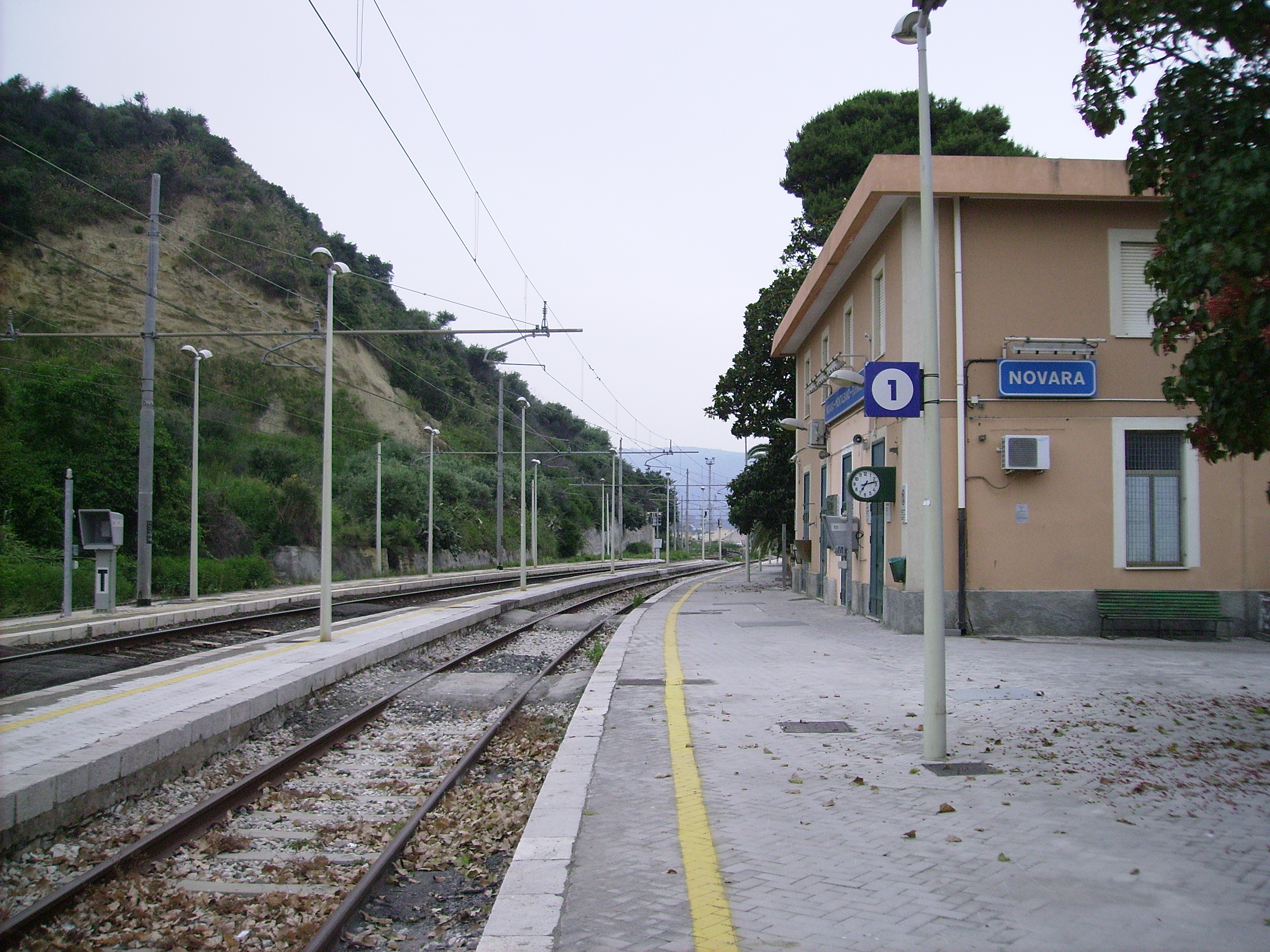
Novara-Montalbano-Furnari railway station

=== Railways ===
The Novara-Montalbano-Furnari railway station is on the Palermo–Messina railway. It is served by trains run by Trenitalia, including services from Messina.

=== Bus and tram ===
Basicò is served by bus provided from Azienda Siciliana Trasporti.
