= Oliveri =

- Comune
- Comune di Oliveri
- Location within Italy Location within Sicily
- Coordinates: 38°7′N 15°4′E
- Country: Italy
- Region: Sicily
- Metropolitan city: Messina (ME)

Area
  - Total: 10.3 km^{2} (4.0 sq mi)
- Elevation: 2 m (6.6 ft)

Population (Dec. 2004)
  - Total: 2,076
  - Density: 202/km^{2} (522/sq mi)
- Time zone: UTC+1 (CET)
  - Summer (DST): UTC+2 (CEST)
- Postal code: 98060
- Dialing code: 0941

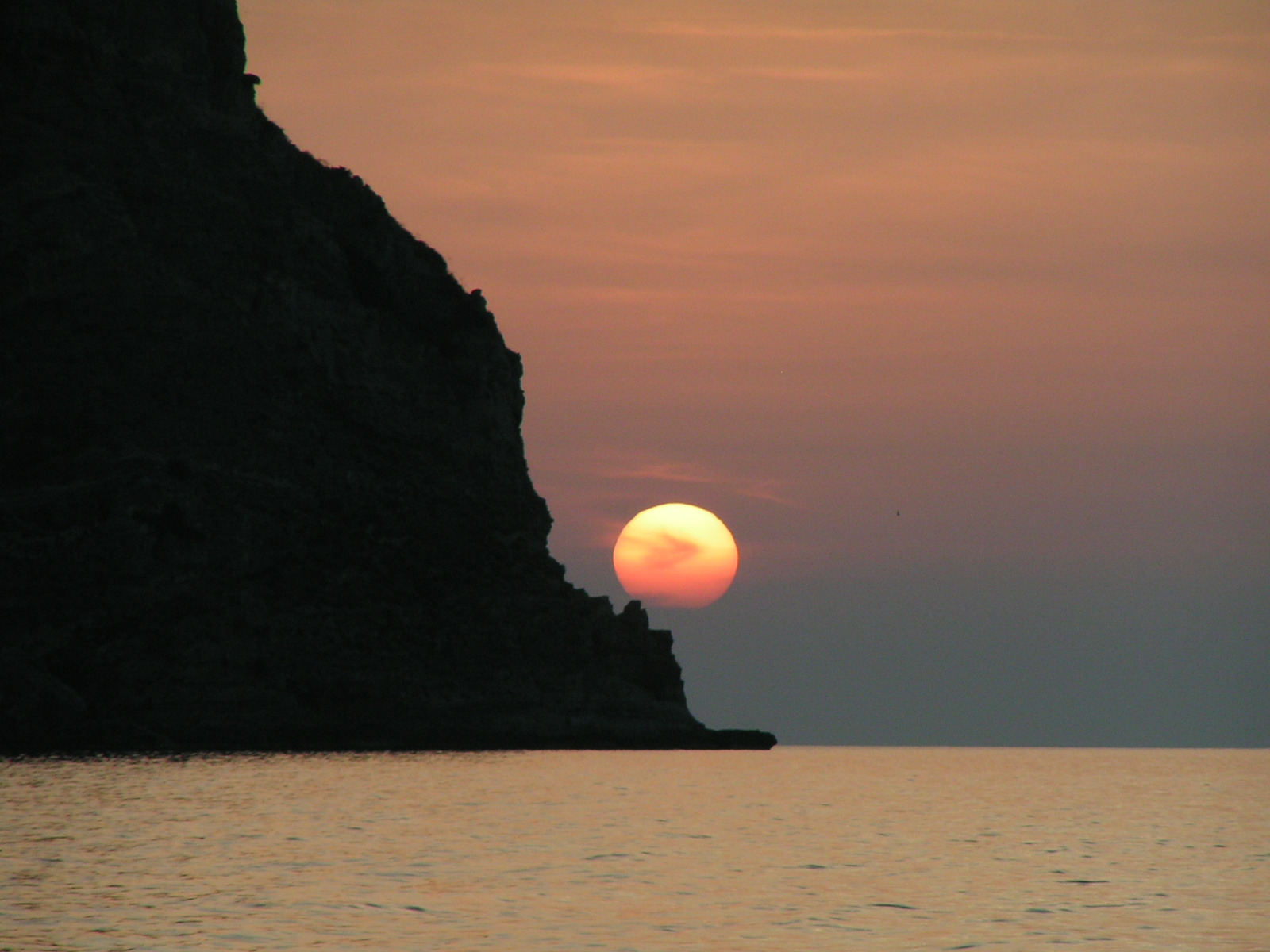
The tongue of sand in Oliveri is where the lagoons of Tindari are located.

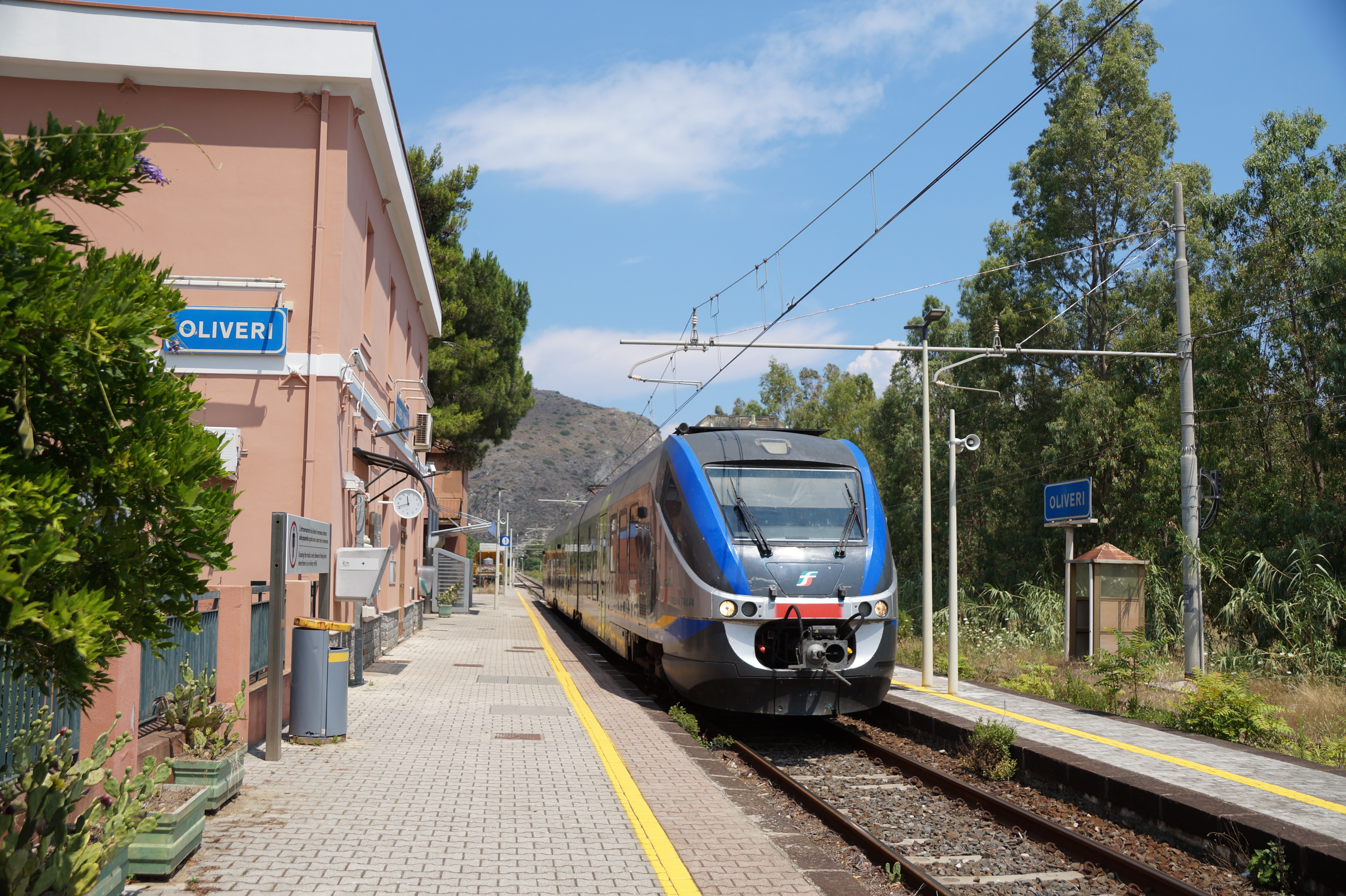
Oliveri railway station

Oliveri (Sicilian: Oluveri) is a comune (municipality) in the Province of Messina in the Italian region Sicily, located about 150 kilometres (93 mi) east of Palermo and about 45 kilometres (28 mi) west of Messina. As of 31 December 2004, it had a population of 2,076 and an area of 10.3 square kilometres (4.0 mi^{2}).

Oliveri borders the following municipalities: Falcone, Montalbano Elicona, Patti.

== Public transport ==
=== Railways ===
Oliveri railway station is on the Palermo–Messina railway. It is served by trains run by Trenitalia, including services from Messina.

=== Bus and tram ===
Oliveri is served by bus provided from Azienda Siciliana Trasporti.

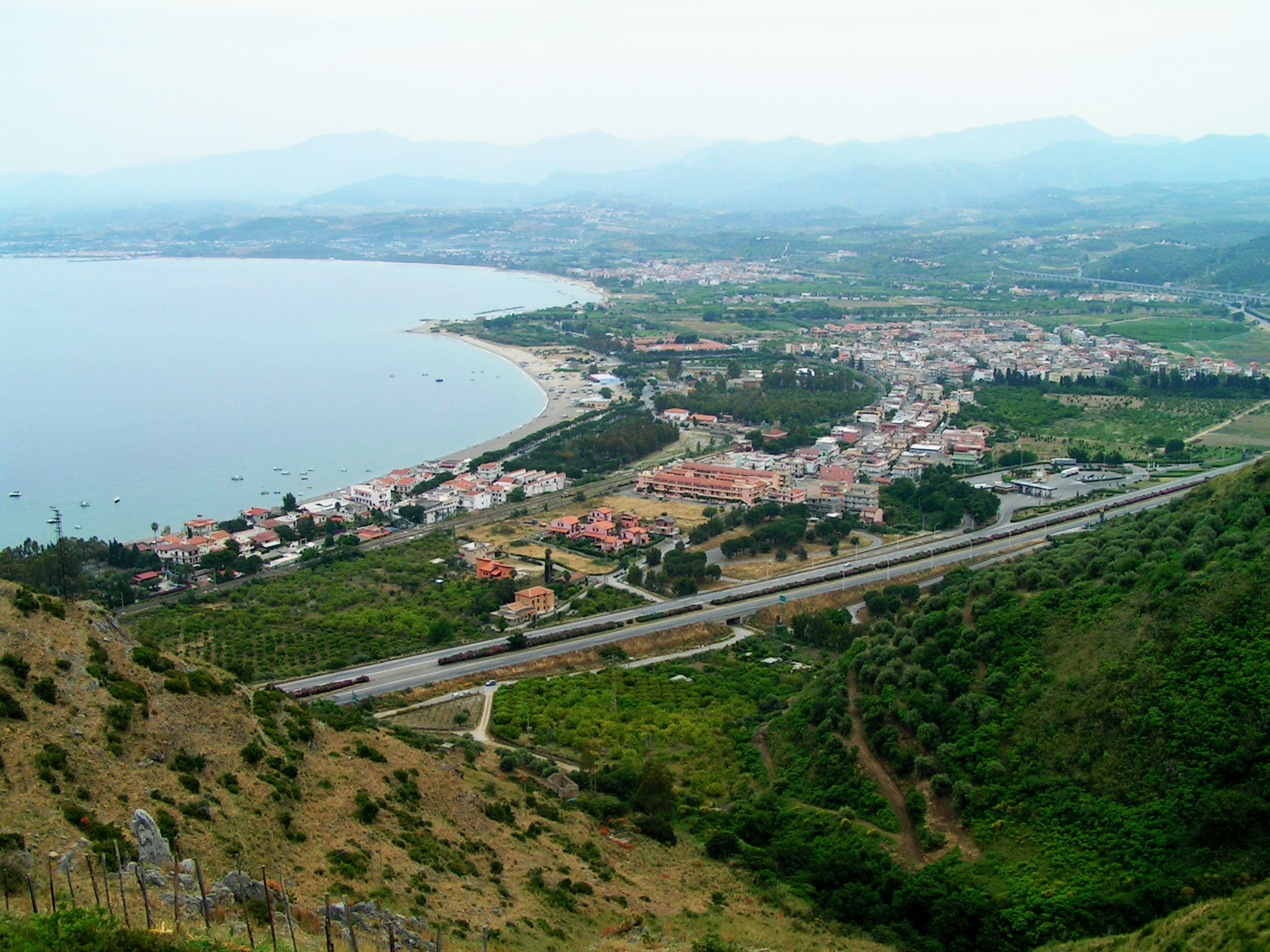
Oliveri panorama taken from the hill of Tindari

== Demographic evolution ==
Historical population

Year	Pop.	±%
1861	571	—
1871	761	+33.3%
1881	1,000	+31.4%
1901	1,474	+47.4%
1911	1,433	−2.8%

Year	Pop.	±%
1921	1,505	+5.0%
1931	1,550	+3.0%
1936	1,704	+9.9%
1951	1,937	+13.7%
1961	1,803	−6.9%

Year	Pop.	±%
1971	1,626	−9.8%
1981	1,793	+10.3%
1991	2,083	+16.2%
2001	2,099	+0.8%

Source: Data from ISTAT
