= Roccella Valdemone =

- Comune
- Comune di Roccella Valdemone
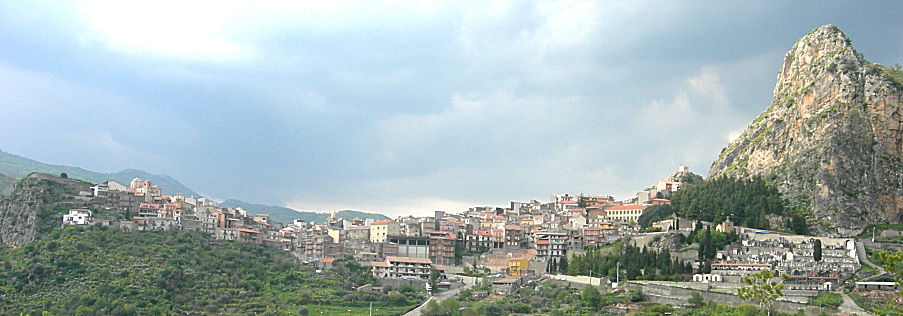

- Location within Italy Location within Sicily
- Coordinates: 37°56′N 15°1′E
- Country: Italy
- Region: Sicily
- Metropolitan city: Messina (ME)

Government
  - Mayor: Giuseppe Spartà

Area
  - Total: 41.0 km^{2} (15.8 sq mi)
- Elevation: 812 m (2,664 ft)

Population (30 November 2011)
  - Total: 714
  - Density: 17.4/km^{2} (45.1/sq mi)
- Demonym: Roccellesi
- Time zone: UTC+1 (CET)
  - Summer (DST): UTC+2 (CEST)
- Postal code: 98030
- Dialing code: 0942
- Website: Official website

Roccella Valdemone (Sicilian: Rascidda Vaddemuni) is a comune (municipality) in the Metropolitan City of Messina in the Italian region Sicily, located about 150 kilometres (93 mi) east of Palermo and about 50 kilometres (31 mi) southwest of Messina.

Roccella Valdemone borders the following municipalities: Castiglione di Sicilia, Malvagna, Mojo Alcantara, Montalbano Elicona, Randazzo, Santa Domenica Vittoria.
