= Church of St Nicholas, Melnik =

Church in Blagoevgrad, Bulgaria

Coordinates: 41°31′13.49″N 23°23′32.69″E

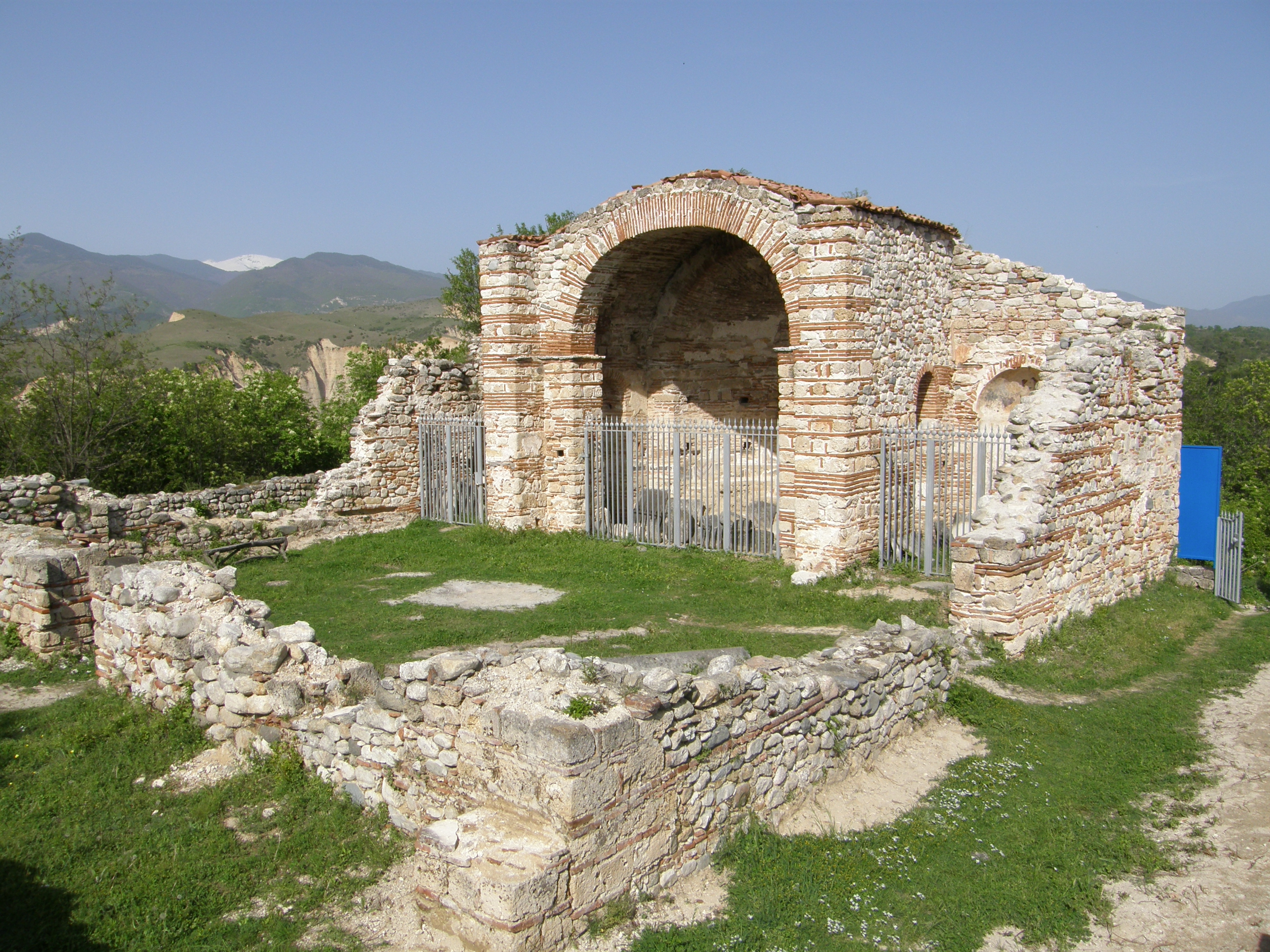
Overview of the Church of St Nicholas ruins

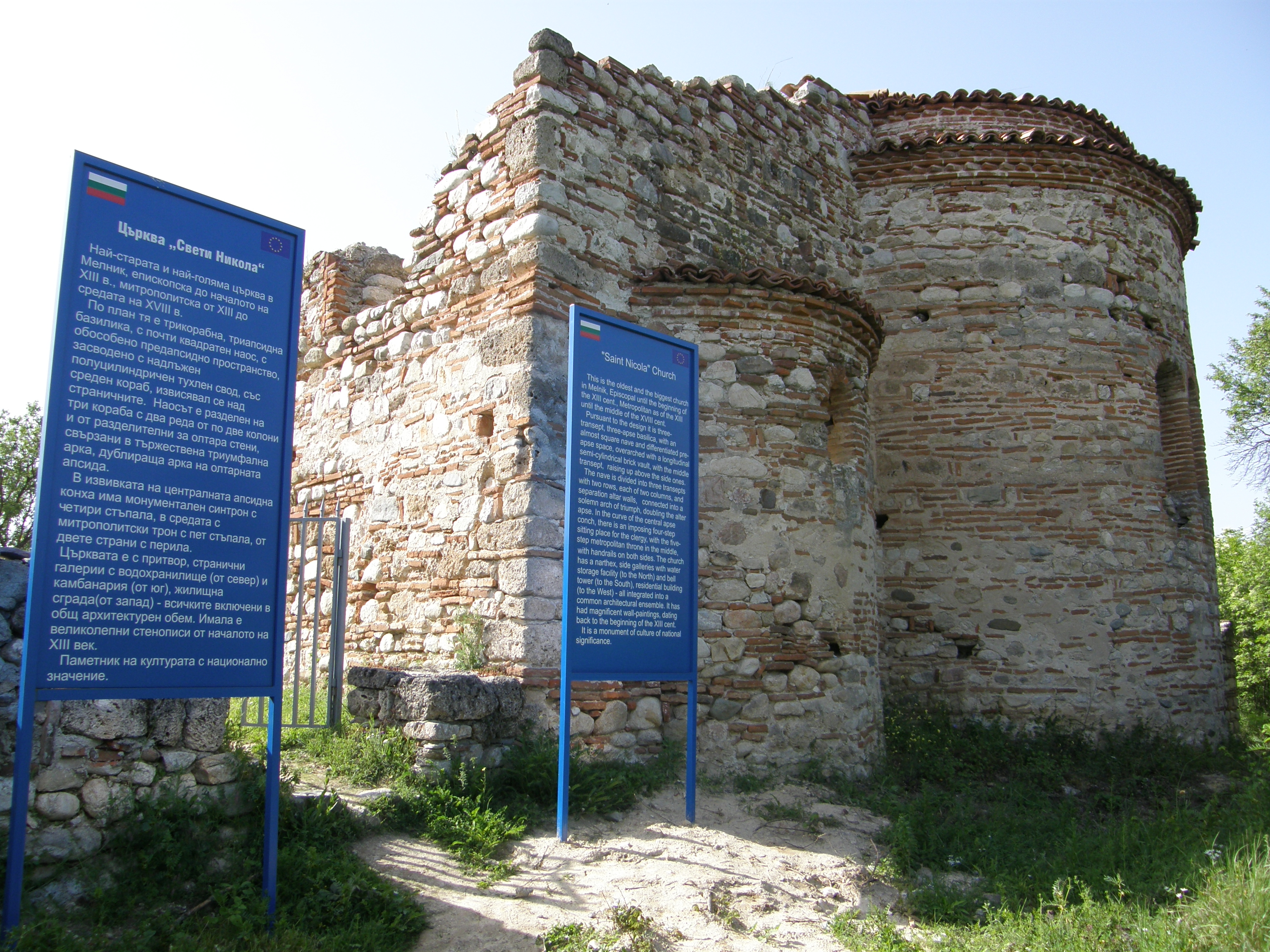
Exterior apse view

The Church of St Nicholas (Bulgarian: църква „Свети Никола“, tsarkva „Sveti Nikola“) is a partially preserved medieval Eastern Orthodox church in the town of Melnik in Blagoevgrad Province, southwestern Bulgaria. Dating to the late 12th century, it stands on top of an ancient Thracian sanctuary and a 5th-century basilica. In the Middle Ages, the church served as the cathedral of Melnik's bishop. The interior of the church features frescoes of rarely depicted scenes, as well as a 13th-century inscription. Its bell tower used to house one of the oldest extant church bells in Europe, discovered by archaeologists in the 2000s.

== History ==
The Church of St Nicholas lies on top of the eponymous hill of Sveti Nikola ("Saint Nicholas") just south of the town of Melnik. The church occupies a location which hosted other sacred buildings in Antiquity. A Thracian sanctuary devoted to the goddess Bendis, the Thracian variant of Artemis, stood at the place before a Christian basilica was built in the 5th century. However, the older church did not survive for long, as it was ruined by the end of the 6th century.

The Church of St Nicholas is generally dated to the late 12th century, a time when Melnik was ruled by both Byzantium and the Second Bulgarian Empire. There is a single opinion which links the building of the church with the rule of Prince Boris I of Bulgaria (r. 852–889) and the period shortly after the Christianization of Bulgaria, though the evidence for this is not accepted by most scholars. A second stage of construction followed in the first half of the 13th century, when the Church of St Nicholas was elevated to the seat of a bishop. In order for the church to better fulfil that purpose, a fence and additional buildings were constructed around it to form a compound.

The church served as the town's cathedral until the construction of the similarly named Church of St Nicholas the Wonderworker in the 18th century. Although the medieval Church of St Nicholas was in use as late as the 19th century as a monastery church, it is only partially preserved today, with all but the eastern part entirely in ruins. After the Balkan Wars (1912–1913), Melnik was deserted by much of its population and the lack of maintenance resulted in the church's rapid structural decay.

== Architecture, decoration and epigraphy ==
The Church of St Nicholas was constructed out of interchanging rows of stones and brickwork, and measures 15.80 by 15.50 metres (51.8 ft × 50.9 ft). Architecturally, it is a three-naved basilica church; the naves were formed by two rows of columns which ran along the length of the cella (or naos). It has three entrances, all from the west, and three apses in the easternmost part. The side apses are smaller than the one in the middle, which features an elaborate three-part window and additional decoration. The narthex and the four-stepped adobe synthronon (stone benches for the clergy) were added during the second period of construction in the 13th century. The synthronon fits inside the middle apse and includes a throne with railings in the middle.

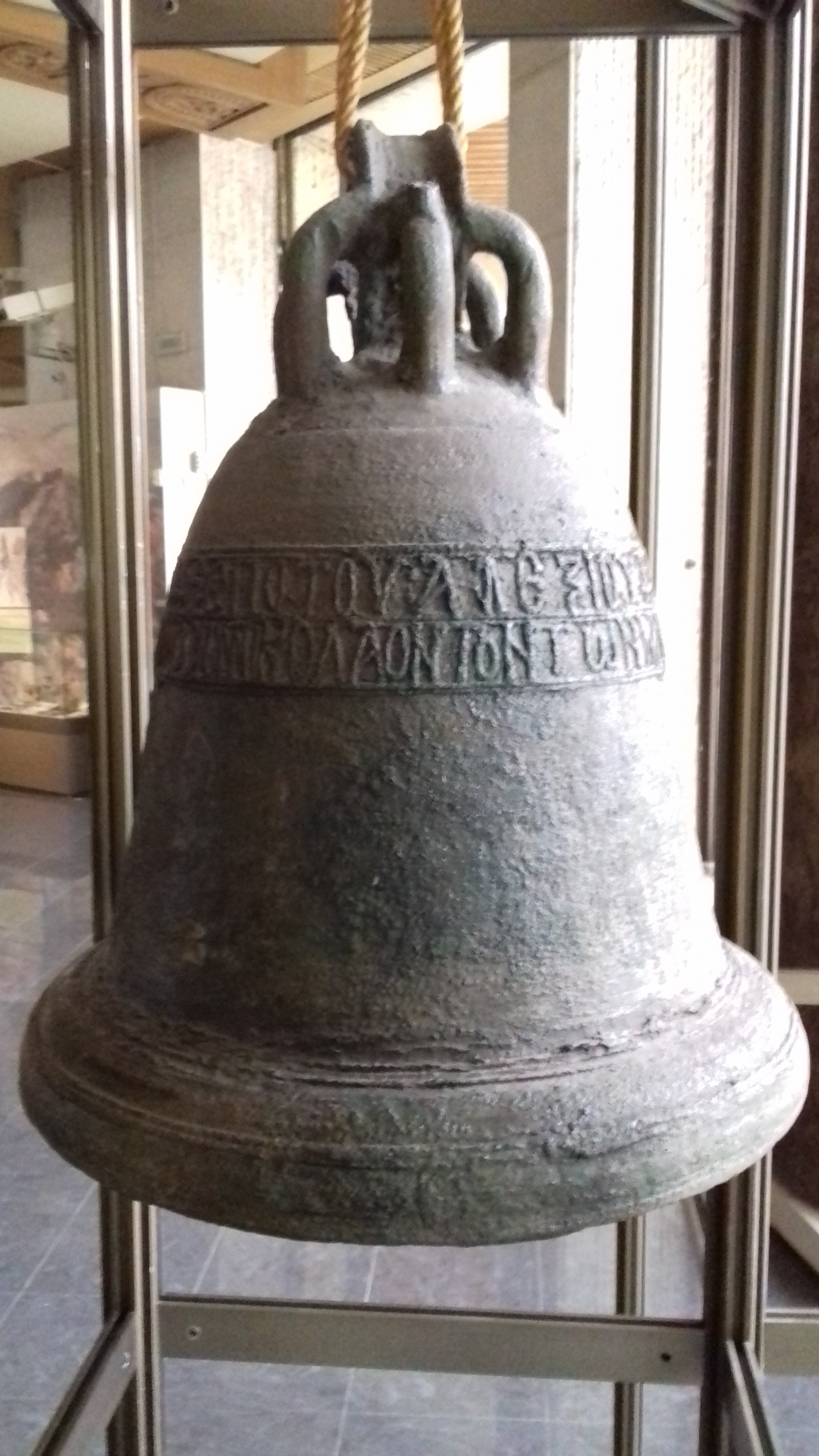
Bronze bell of the Church of St Nicholas, National Historical Museum

The church had an adjacent bell tower, which was a separate rectangular structure that lay to the southwest of the church. Its walls were 4–4.5 metres (13–15 ft) long and around 1 metre (3.3 ft) thick. Architects Vasilka Gerasimova–Tomova and Violeta Pesheva believe that it reached 15–16 metres (49–52 ft) in height and that it was built in the 1210s under Bulgarian despot Alexius Slav (fl. 1208–1228), a largely independent medieval ruler of Melnik and the Rhodope Mountains.

A bronze church bell with a relief Medieval Greek text, considered by Bulgarian researchers to be among the oldest extant church bells in Europe, was unearthed in Melnik in the 2000s. The inscription prompted the researchers to associate the bell with the Church of St Nicholas. It reads: "Copper-smelted church bell, a gift by Alexius, who is the pious Slav, to Saint Nicholas of Myra". The text is thought to reference Alexius Slav, thus it is dated to his rule and the construction of the bell tower. A very similar bell, also found in Melnik, bears an inscription which mentions Byzantine Emperor Michael VIII Palaiologos (r. 1259–1282) and the year 1270 specifically. However, this second bell may not have belonged to the Church of St Nicholas, but rather to another church in Melnik.

The church's frescoes were painted in the 12th–13th century by three artists. The surviving murals include rare depictions of the ordination of Apostle James the Greater for bishop of Jerusalem by the Church Fathers and the vision of Peter of Alexandria. The life of church patron Saint Nicholas is also painted on the walls of the church. The frescoes also feature portraits of Antipas of Pergamum, Anthimus of Nicomedia, Gregory of Nyssa and Procopius of Scythopolis. Some of the murals have been stripped from the walls and sent to the National Archaeological Museum in Sofia, though others remain in place.

A 13th-century Greek-language inscription was discovered on the interior walls of the Church of St Nicholas. In translation, it reads: "Prayer of God's slave sebastos Vladimir, brother of a single womb of the sebastos of the Franks" or "... of sebastos Frank", the former considered more likely. The epigraph is linked with the rule of Alexius Slav over Melnik and provides an insight into the organization and makeup of Alexius Slav's court.
