= Motta Camastra =

- Comune
- Comune di Motta Camastra
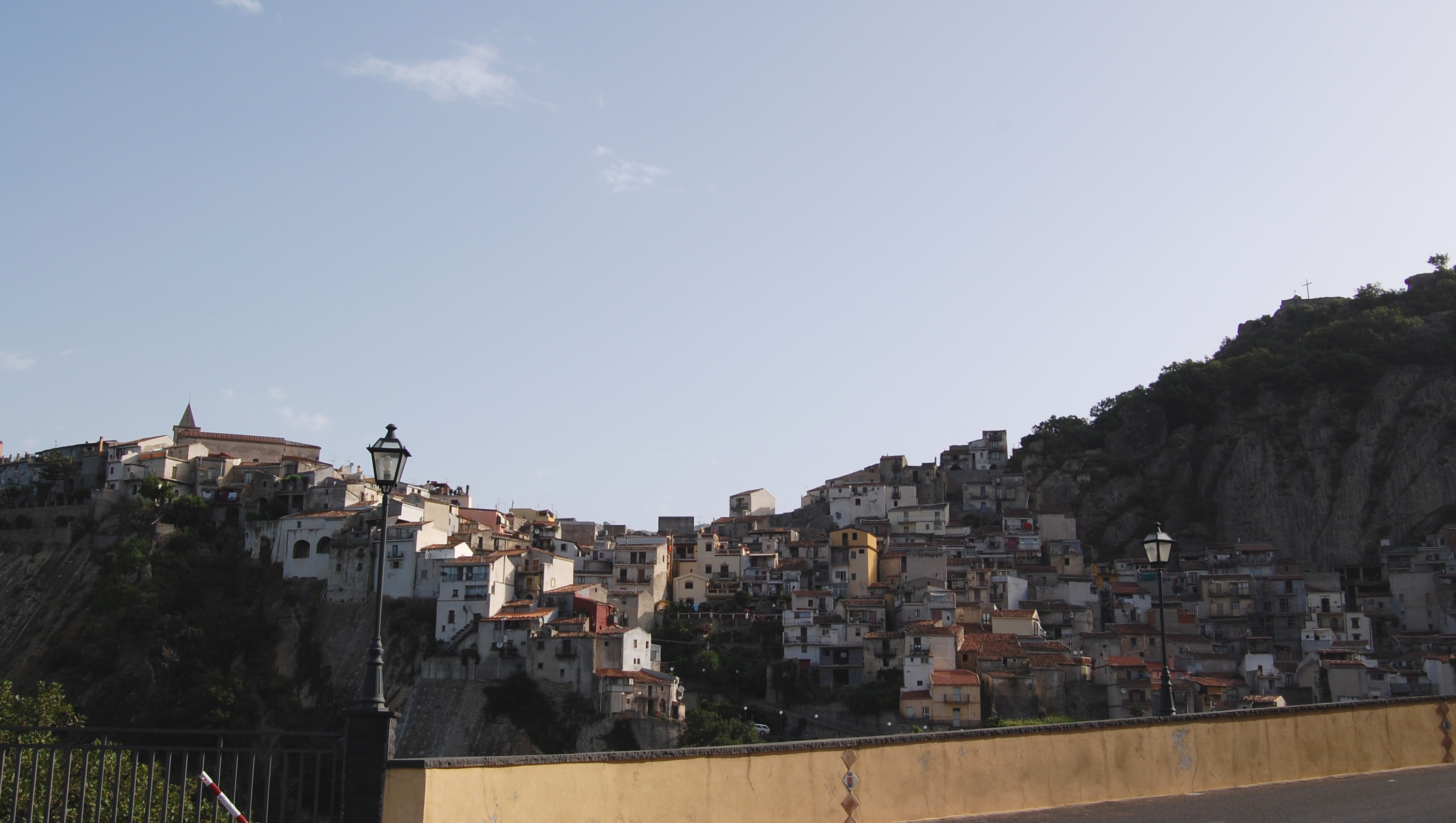
- Motta Camastra skyline

- Location within Italy Location within Sicily
- Coordinates: 37°54′N 15°10′E
- Country: Italy
- Region: Sicily
- Metropolitan city: Messina (ME)
- Frazioni: Fondaco Motta e San Cataldo

Government
  - Mayor: Carmelo Blancato

Area
  - Total: 25.3 km^{2} (9.8 sq mi)
- Elevation: 423 m (1,388 ft)

Population (30 November 2011)
  - Total: 888
  - Density: 35.1/km^{2} (90.9/sq mi)
- Demonym: Mottesi
- Time zone: UTC+1 (CET)
  - Summer (DST): UTC+2 (CEST)
- Postal code: 98030
- Dialing code: 0942
- Website: Official website

Motta Camastra is a comune (municipality) in the Metropolitan City of Messina in the Italian region Sicily, located about 160 kilometres (99 mi) east of Palermo and about 45 kilometres (28 mi) southwest of Messina.

Motta Camastra borders the following municipalities: Antillo, Castiglione di Sicilia, Francavilla di Sicilia, Graniti.
