= Mojo Alcantara =

- Comune
- Comune di Mojo Alcantara
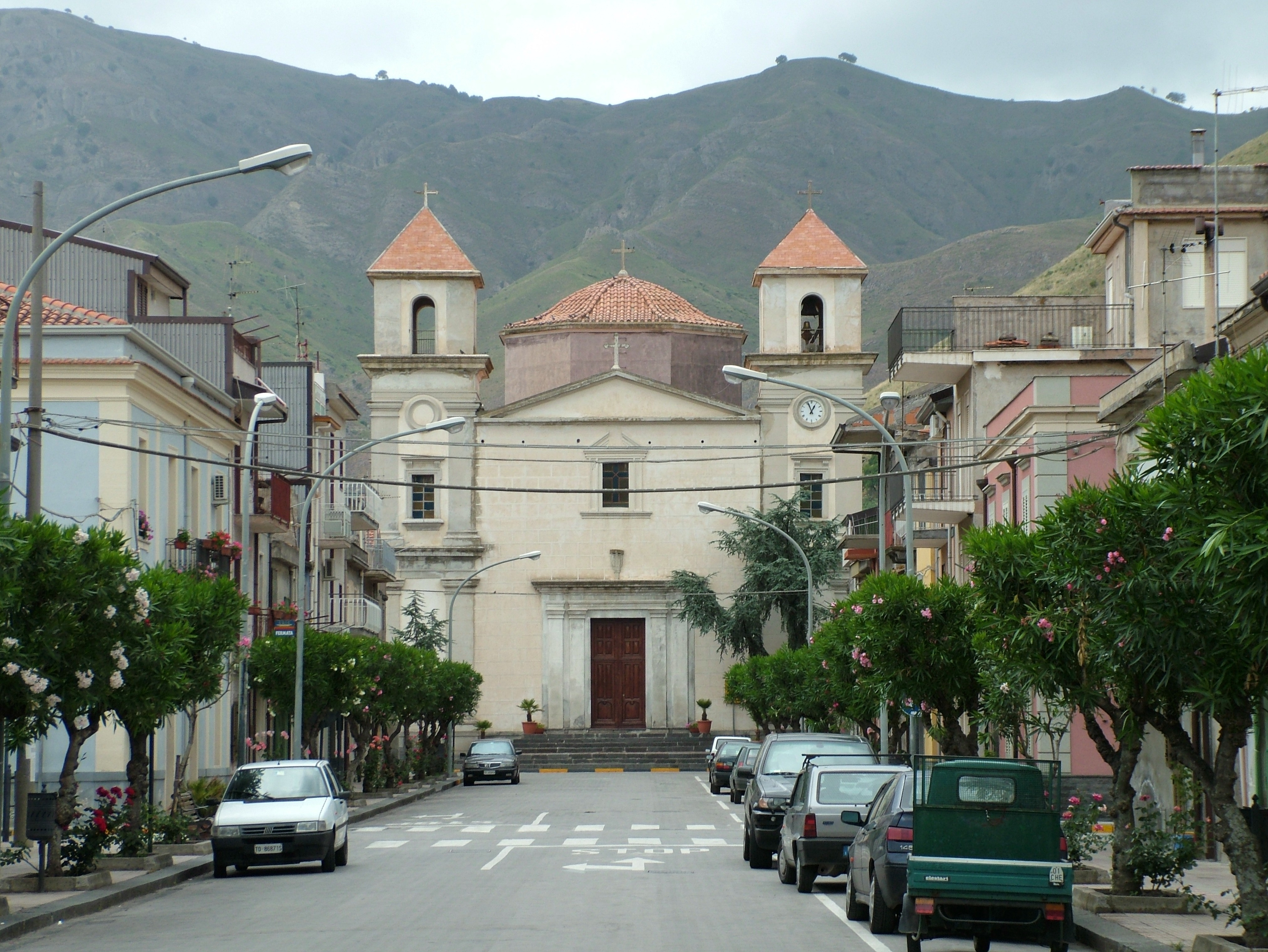

- Location within Italy Location within Sicily
- Coordinates: 37°54′N 15°3′E
- Country: Italy
- Region: Sicily
- Metropolitan city: Messina (ME)

Government
  - Mayor: Antonino Angelo Piazza

Area
  - Total: 8.4 km^{2} (3.2 sq mi)
- Elevation: 535 m (1,755 ft)

Population (30 November 2011)
  - Total: 756
  - Density: 90/km^{2} (230/sq mi)
- Demonym: Moiesi
- Time zone: UTC+1 (CET)
  - Summer (DST): UTC+2 (CEST)
- Postal code: 98030
- Dialing code: 0942
- Website: Official website

Mojo Alcantara (Sicilian: Moju d'Alcàntara) is a comune (municipality) in the Metropolitan City of Messina in the Italian region Sicily, located about 150 kilometres (93 mi) east of Palermo and about 50 kilometres (31 mi) southwest of Messina.

Mojo Alcantara borders the following municipalities: Castiglione di Sicilia, Malvagna, Roccella Valdemone. It takes its name from the Alcantara river, flowing nearby, and the Monte Mojo, a side volcanic cone of Mount Etna.
