= Abacaenum =

Ancient city of Magna Graecia, Sicily

Coordinates: 38.0563°N 15.1020°E

Abacaenum (Ancient Greek: Ἀβάκαινον; Ἀβάκαινα) was an ancient city of Magna Graecia in Sicily, situated about 6.5 km from the north coast, between Tyndaris (modern Tindari) and Mylae (modern Milazzo), and 13 km from the former city.

Remains of the city have been excavated from 2005.

== History ==
Abacaenum was a city of the Siculi and does not appear to have ever been a Greek colony, though it was influenced by Greek art and civilisation. For this reason it is considered a poleis of Magna Graecia.

Its territory originally included that of Tyndaris, which was separated from it by the elder Dionysius when he founded that city in 395 BC. Dionysius defeated the Carthaginian general Mago in the battle of Abacaenum in 393 BC. From the way in which it is mentioned in the wars of Dionysius, Agathocles, and Hieron, it is clear that it was a place of power and importance: but for a period from the time of Hieron it disappears from history, and no mention is found of it in the Verrine orations of Cicero. Its name is, however, found in Ptolemy, so that it appears to have still continued to exist in his day. Its decline was probably owing to the increasing prosperity of the neighbouring city of Tyndaris. Abacaenum was allied with Agathocles of Syracuse.

There can be little doubt that the ruins visible in the time of Tommaso Fazello, at the foot of the hill on which the modern town of Tripi is situated, were those of Abacaenum. He speaks of fragments of masonry, prostrate columns, and the vestiges of walls, indicating the site of a large city, but which had been destroyed to its foundations.

== Coinage ==
Coin of Abacaenum.

Abacaenum is famous for its mint and its silver and copper coins that bear the classic symbols of sows, boars and acorns found in museums around the world. The acorns evidently refer to the great forests of oak which still cover the neighbouring mountains and give pasture to large herds of swine.
