= Tripi-Abakainon =

Tripi-Abakainon Abakainòn (Greek)
- Comune
- Comune di Tripi-Abakainon
- Coat of arms

- Location within Italy Location within Sicily
- Coordinates: 38°03′N 15°06′E
- Country: Italy
- Region: Sicily
- Metropolitan city: Messina (ME)
- Frazioni: Campogrande, Casale, San Cono

Government
  - Mayor: Michele Lemmo

Area
  - Total: 54 km^{2} (21 sq mi)
- Elevation: 450 m (1,480 ft)

Population (30 November 2011)
  - Total: 934
  - Density: 17/km^{2} (45/sq mi)
- Demonym: Tripensi
- Time zone: UTC+1 (CET)
  - Summer (DST): UTC+2 (CEST)
- Postal code: 98060
- Dialing code: 0941
- Patron saint: St. Vincent martyr
- Saint day: December 4 and last Sunday in August
- Website: Official website

Tripi-Abakainon is a town and comune in the Metropolitan City of Messina, Sicily, southern Italy. It is located on the site of Abacaenum, an ancient Sicel town.

== Public transport ==
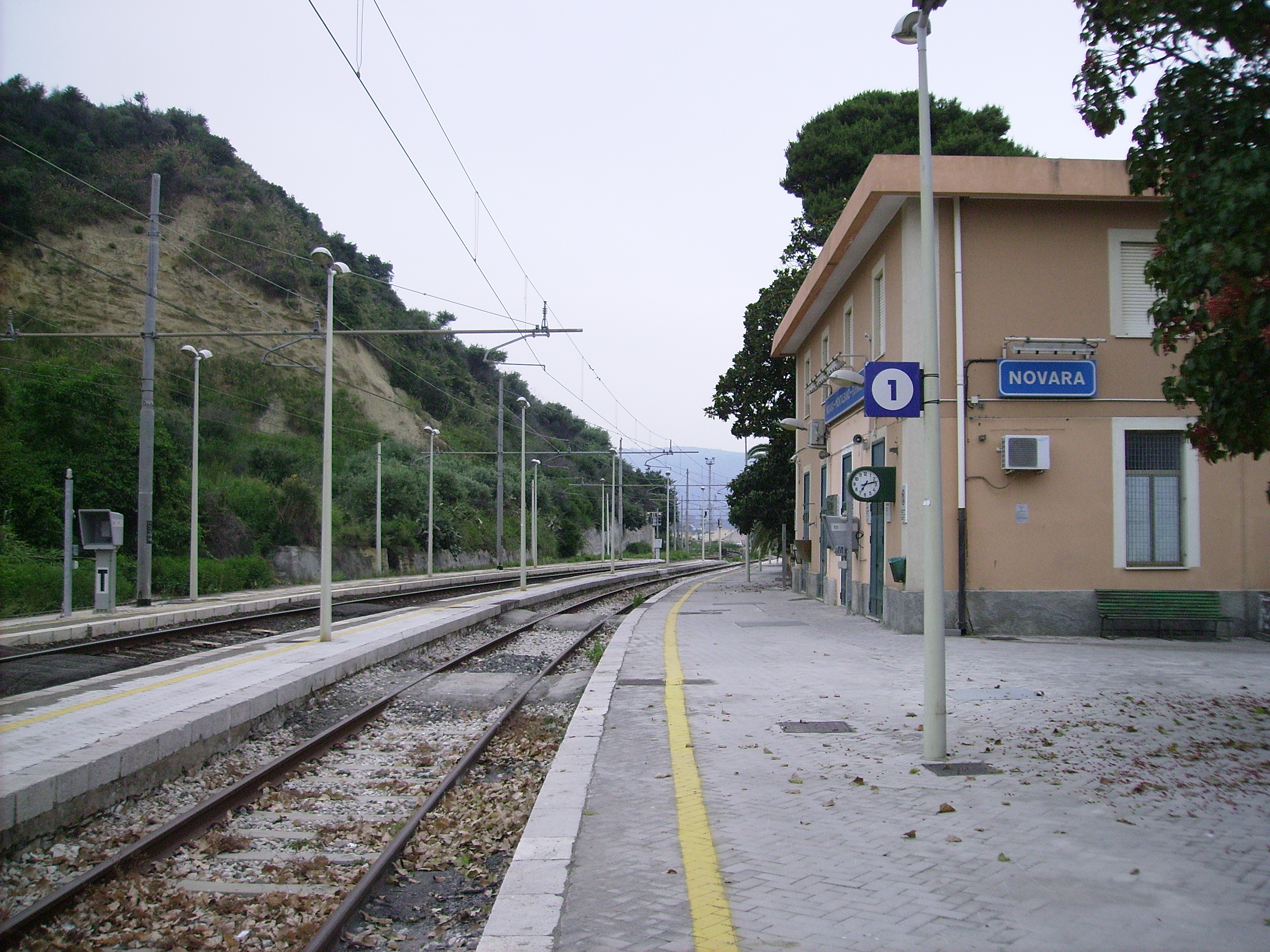
Novara-Montalbano-Furnari railway station

=== Railways ===
Novara-Montalbano-Furnari railway station is on the Palermo–Messina railway. It is served by trains run by Trenitalia, including services from Messina. Outside of the station is available an Uber service by app.

=== Bus and tram ===
Tripi is served by bus provided from Azienda Siciliana Trasporti.

== History ==
In 2025, the official name was changed from Tripi to Tripi-Abakainon.

== People ==
- Francesco Todaro (1839–1918)
