= Monte Scuderi =

Mountain in Italy

Coordinates: 38.0650°N 15.4018°E

Monte Scuderi (1,254 m (4,114 ft) high) is a mountain of the Peloritani range located in northeast Sicily. It boasts a flat rocky peak from where it's possible to view a superb panorama including the Strait of Messina, Mount Etna, the Aeolian Islands and the Calabria coast. A cave and ancient ruins lie on the summit and they say also that a split that is on that mount was created when Jesus Christ died. A popular attraction to the peak is the myth of buried treasure. Trails to its top start from the towns of Itala, Alì and from the Santissima gorge near Fiumedinisi. The mountain is home to a nature reserve.

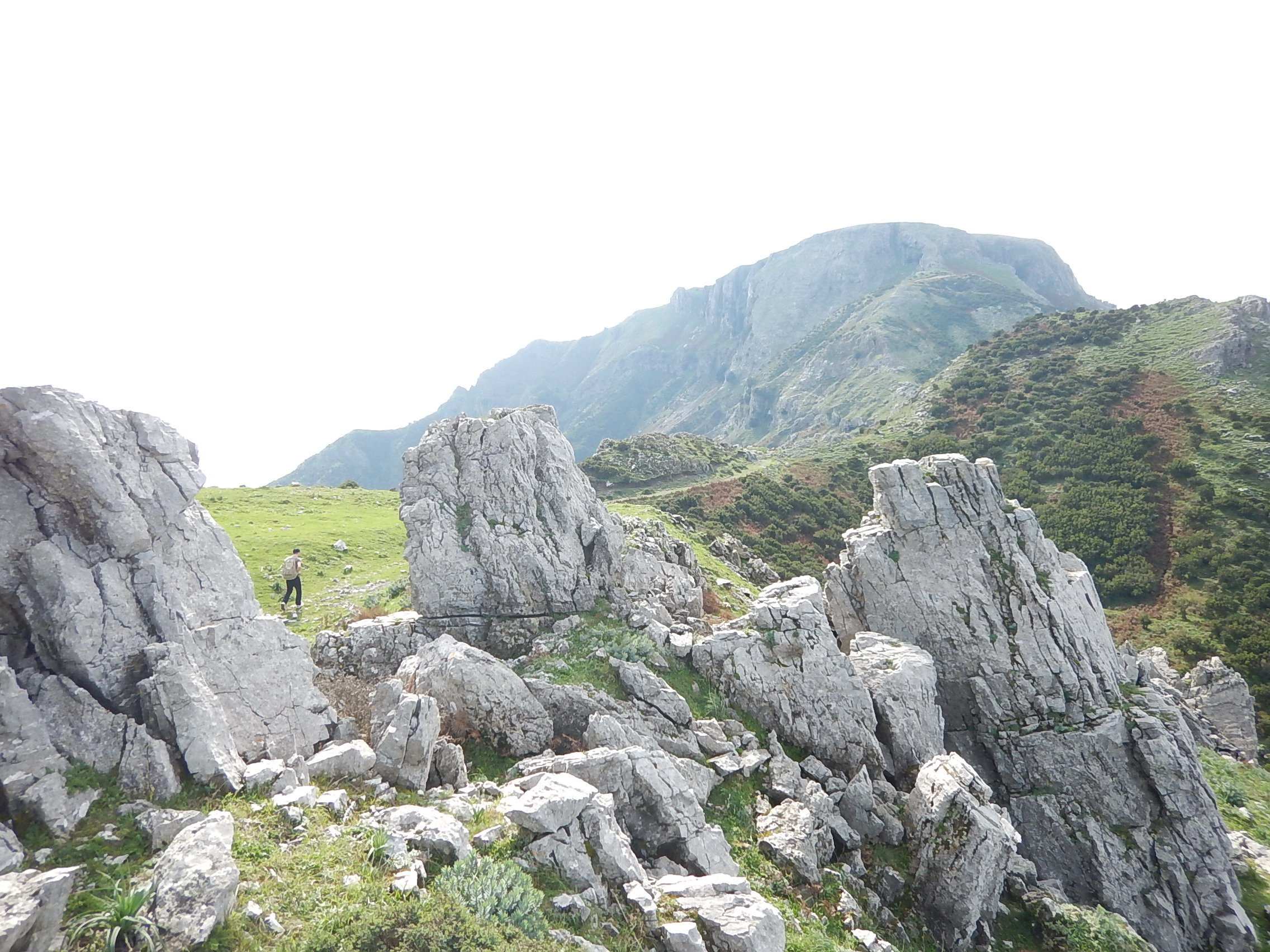
Looking towards Monte Scuderi

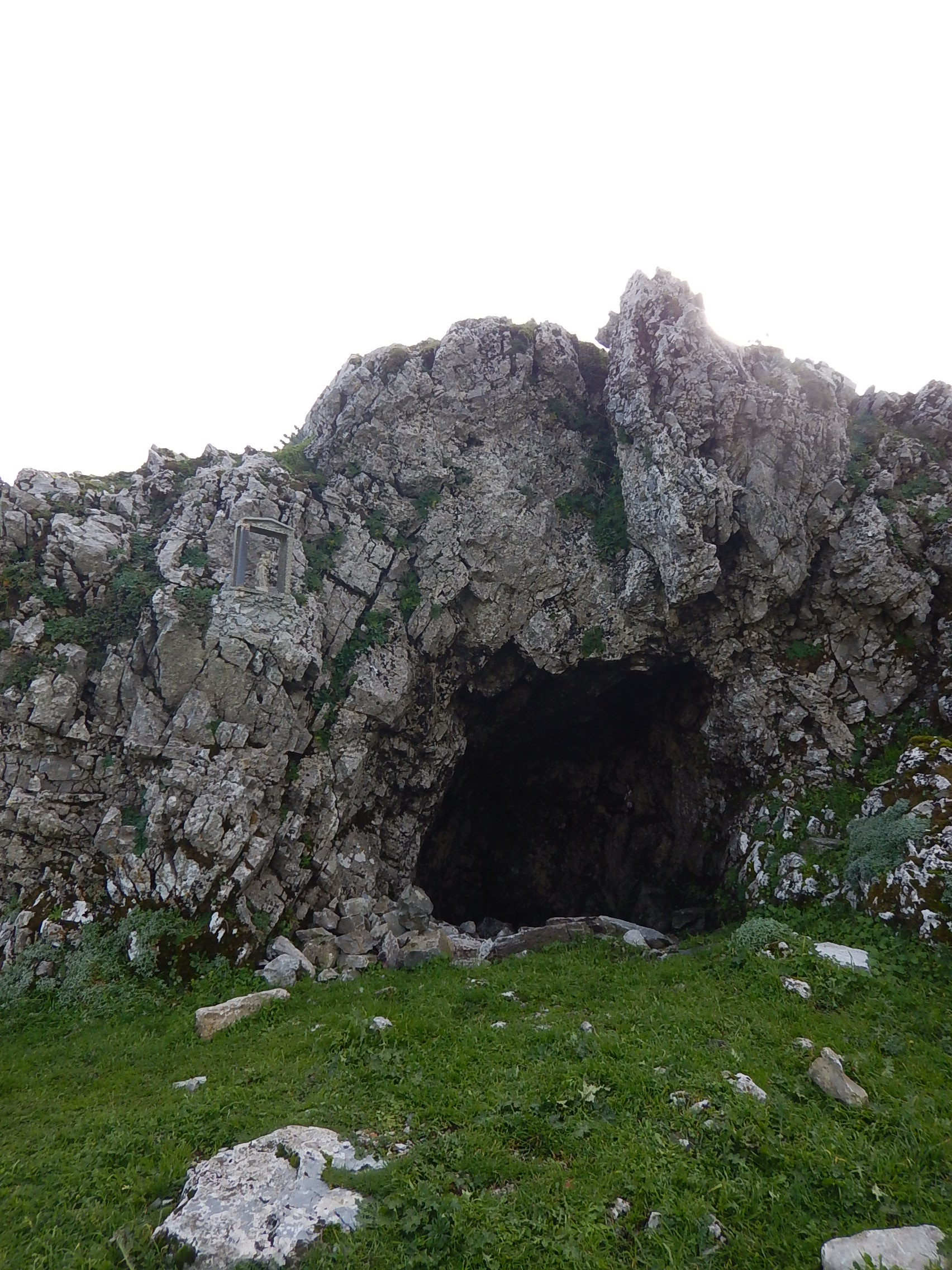
The cave at the top

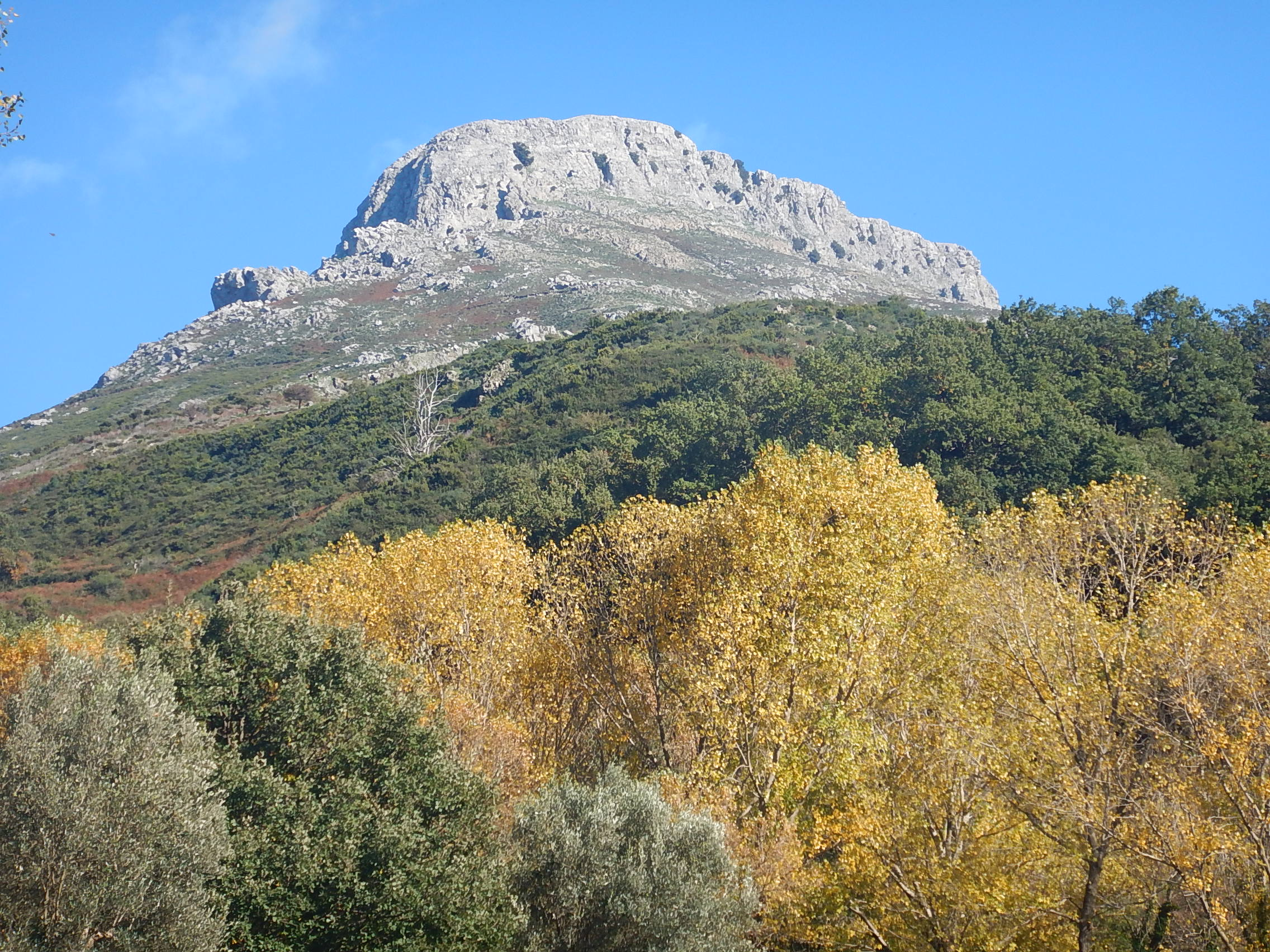
Mount Scuderi seen from the Santissima gorge
