= Vincenzo Fimratura =

Roman Catholic clergyman

Most Reverend Vincenzo Fimratura
- Prelate of Santa Lucia del Mela
- Church: Catholic Church
- Diocese: Territorial Prelature of Santa Lucia del Mela
- In office: 1628–1648
- Predecessor: Antonio Franco (bishop)
- Successor: Martino La Farina

Personal details
- Died: 3 March 1648 Santa Lucia del Mela, Italy

Vincenzo Fimratura (died 3 March 1648) was a Roman Catholic priest who served as Prelate of Santa Lucia del Mela (1628–1648).

== Biography ==
On 24 March 1628, Vincenzo Fimratura was appointed by Pope Urban VIII as Prelate of Santa Lucia del Mela. He served as Prelate of Santa Lucia del Mela until his death on 3 March 1648.

== External links and additional sources ==
- Cheney, David M. "Territorial Prelature of Santa Lucia del Mela". Catholic-Hierarchy.org. (for Chronology of Bishops) ^{[self-published]}
- Chow, Gabriel. "Territorial Prelature of Santa Lucia del Mela (Italy)". GCatholic.org. (for Chronology of Bishops) ^{[self-published]}

Catholic Church titles
| Preceded by Antonio Franco (blessed) | Prelate of Santa Lucia del Mela; 1628–1648 | Succeeded by Martino La Farina |
