= Juan d'Espinar =

Most Reverend Juan d'Espinar
- Prelate of Santa Lucia del Mela
- Church: Catholic Church
- Diocese: Territorial Prelature of Santa Lucia del Mela
- In office: 1590–1601
- Predecessor: Girolamo Riggio
- Successor: Simone Rao Grimaldi

Personal details
- Died: 1601 Santa Lucia del Mela, Italy

Juan d'Espinar (died 1601) was a Roman Catholic bishop who served as Prelate of Santa Lucia del Mela (1590–1601).

== Biography ==
In 1590, Juan d'Espinar was appointed by Pope Sixtus V as Bishop of the Territorial Prelature of Santa Lucia del Mela. He served as Prelate of Santa Lucia del Mela until his death in 1601.

== External links and additional sources ==
- Cheney, David M. "Territorial Prelature of Santa Lucia del Mela". Catholic-Hierarchy.org. (for Chronology of Bishops) ^{[self-published]}
- Chow, Gabriel. "Territorial Prelature of Santa Lucia del Mela (Italy)". GCatholic.org. (for Chronology of Bishops) ^{[self-published]}

Catholic Church titles
| Preceded by Girolamo Riggio | Prelate of Santa Lucia del Mela; 1590–1601 | Succeeded by Simone Rao Grimaldi |
