= Territorial Prelature of Santa Lucia del Mela =

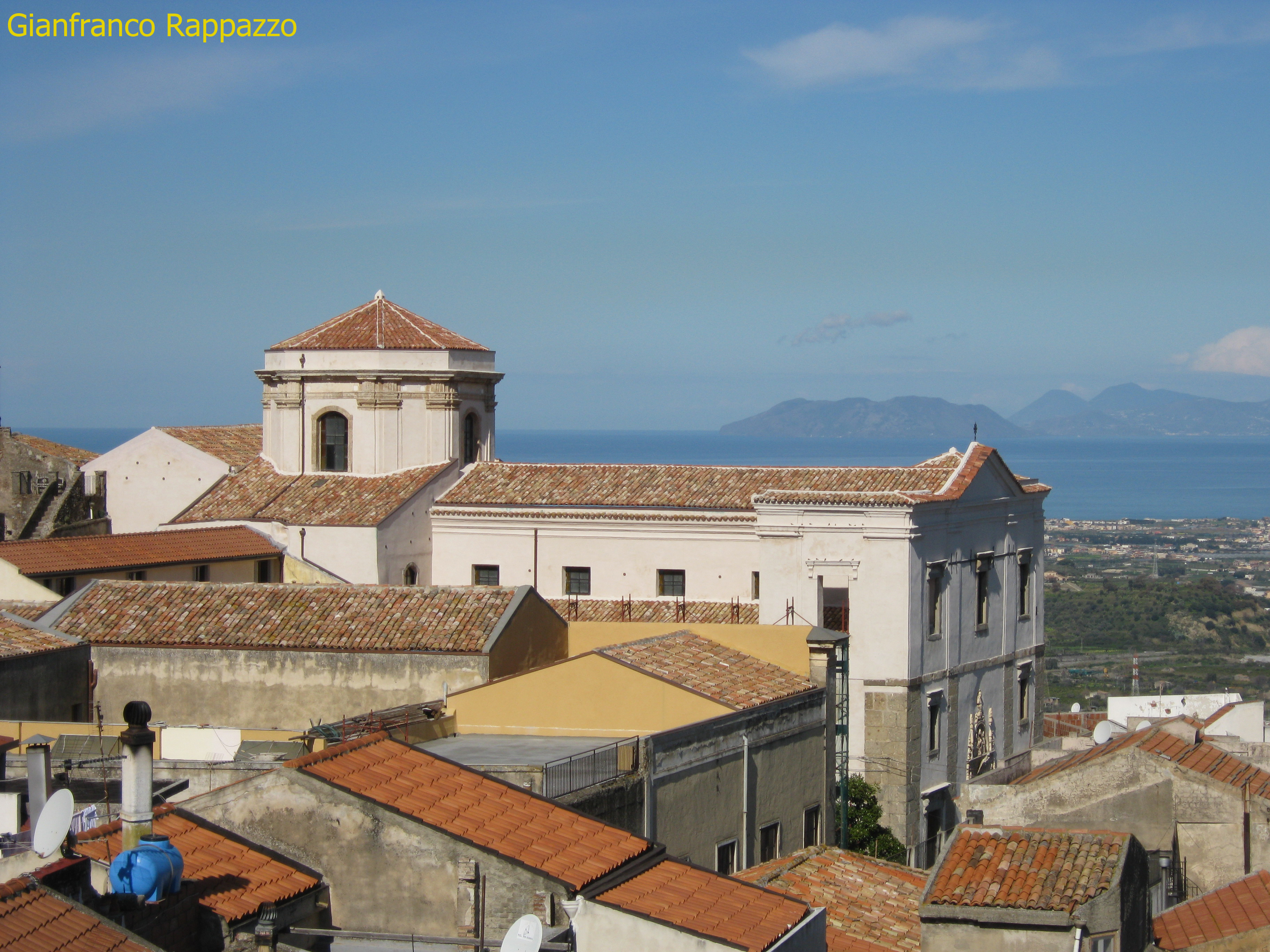
Co-cathedral

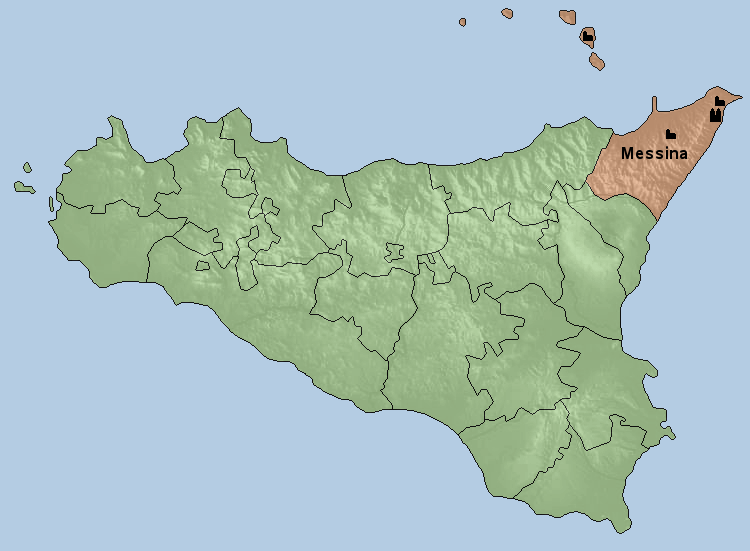
political map

The Territorial Prelature of Santa Lucia del Mela (Latin: Capellania Major Sanctae Luciae de Milatio) was a Roman Catholic territorial prelature in Italy, located in the city of Santa Lucia del Mela, a commune (municipality) in the administrative Province of Messina on the island of Sicily. The incumbent was an abbot, and therefore a prelate; he might or might not also have been a titular bishop of some abandoned diocese. The Prelature of Santa Maria del Mela was not itself a diocese. In 1986, the Prelature was suppressed and merged into the Archdiocese of Messina-Lipari-Santa Lucia del Mela.

== History ==
The territory on which the church of Santa Lucia was founded was originally a part of the diocese of Troina. When that diocese was suppressed it became part of the diocese of Messina (1090), and then part of the diocese of Patti (1131).

The office of capellanus major Regis existed by 1148, when Joannes de Nusco is found in that capacity, though he is not attached to any particular place, but served in the royal court at the head of the royal chapel (the main sicilian Royal chapel was the Cappella Palatina of the Royal Palace of Palermo).

=== Establishment of the Prelacy ===
During the vacancy in the Churches of Patti and Lipari, following the death of Bishop Stephanus (1180 – 1199), the Emperor Frederick II established a royal chapel at Santa Lucia in 1206, using his authority as apostolic legate. He established Gregorius Mastaccio, his capellanus major, with all the quasi-episcopal rights, privileges, and powers as belonged to the diocese of Patti. In Sicilian councils, the abbot (prelate) holds a position after the archbishops and bishops, but before any of the other abbots in the kingdom.

The episcopal palace, situated on the main square and with a garden attached, was a gift from King Philip III to Abbot Simone Rao (1602–1616) by an act of 8 November 1613.

Abbot Girolamo Riggio (1585–1589) presided over a diocesan synod in 1590. Abbot Antonio Franco (1616–1626) held a diocesan synod in 1618. On 1 September 1679, Abbot Simone Impellizzeri (1670–1701) held a synod for the Territorial Prelacy of Santa Lucia del Mela.

=== Churches and clergy ===
The principal prelatial church of Santa Lucia was originally served by simple priests. It was the only parish church in the Prelacy. Bishop Simone Impellizzeri (1670–1701) abolished the existing system and established a collegiate church, with three dignities (the Archdeacon, the Deacon and the Cantor) and eighteen canons, with twelve mansionarii and two chaplains. The total population of the Prelature was 4262, in 1742, at the time of the Visitation. There are now two other parishes in the city, San Michele and Annunciation.

The Prelature was served by 102 priests, and there was a Benedictine monastery in the city. There were also convents of Conventual Franciscans, Capuchins, and Observant Franciscans.

Abbot Simone Impellizzeri (1670–1701) moved to establish a clerical seminary in 1700, in the oratory of Saint Philip Neri on the citadel, and made extensive efforts to find adequate funding. The seminary was in operation for four years, but after the death of the abbot in 1701, it was neglected. Another revival was attempted, with a wider base of students, and with the help of the commune, which was granted the right to name four pupils. During the royal Visitation of 1742, the Visitor ordered the creation of a committee to restore the seminary.

=== Suppression ===
On 30 September 1986, the Congregation for Bishops, in the decree "Instantibus Votis," suppressed the diocese of Lipari and the territorial prelacy of Santa Lucia del Mela, and united their territories to the renamed Archdiocese of Messina-Lipari-Santa Lucia del Mela. The changes were made necessary due to the new concordat of 1984 between the Papacy and the Italian republic, and consequent legislation. The Praelatial Church of Santa Lucia was granted the title and status of a co-cathedral, and its Chapter was to have the title of Chapter of the co-cathedral.

== Territorial Prelates of Santa Lucia del Mela ==
=== 1206 to 1700 ===
- Gregorius Mastaccio (c. 1228)

...

- Bartolommeo (de Antiochia) ( ? –1306)
- Damianus de Palitio (attested 1322)
- Petrus de Pernis ( ? – 1346)
- Orlando Brunello (d. 1355)
- Francesco de Luca, O.S.A.
- Dionisio de Murcia, O.E.S.A. ( ? – 1363)
- Philippus de Castro Johanne, O.Min. (1363 – ? )
- Ubertino da Corleone, O.Min. (attested 1372)
- Philippus Crispus, O.E.S.A. ( ? – 1387?)
- Philippus de Ferrario, O.Carm. ( ? – 1402?)
- Thomas de Chrysafi, O.Min. (attested 1416)
- Joannes de Stefano, O.Cist. (attested 1424)
- Jacobus Portius (c. 1435)
- Jacobus Gallarat
- Alemannus de Sicar
- Puccius de Palitio (1452 – 1456)
- Jacobus de Bonnano (attested 1457)
- Jacobus Gagliardus (attested 1457)
- Gabriel Enguerra (1458 – 1467)
- Angelo Stayri (1479 – 1483)
- Leonardus de Albertis (1483 – 1484)
- Giovanni Martino de Vitali (1484 – 1485)
- Dalmatio de Tolosa (1485 – )
- Alfonso d'Aragona (1497)
- Joannes Michael de Mayo (1500)
- Jaime de Conchillos, O. de M. (1505 – 25 Feb 1509)
- Diego Herrera (1510 ? –
- Giovanni Ricci ( ? – 1530)
- Girolamo Zaffarana (c. 1535 ? – 1576)
- Pietro Butiron de Manriquez (1576 – 1585)
- Girolamo Riggio (1585 – 1589 Died)
- Juan d'Espinar (1590 – 1601 Died)
- Simone Rao Grimaldi (15 Aug 1602 – 12 March 1616 Died)
- Antonio Franco (bishop) (12 Nov 1616 – 2 Sep 1626 Died)
- Vincenzo Fimratura (24 March 1628 – 3 March 1648 Died)
- Martino La Farina (21 Sep 1648 – 17 Sep 1668 Died)
- Simone Impellizzeri (29 July 1670 – Aug 1701 Died)

=== 1700 to 1986 ===
- Carlo Massa (4 Dec 1702 – 26 Dec 1704)
- Pedro Solerá Montoya ( 1709 – 31 March 1711)
- Francesco Barabàra (May 1712 – 15 Jan 1732)
- Antonio Ura (15 Oct 1732 – 28 Oct 1735 Died)
- Marcello Moscella (5 Jan 1736 – 10 April 1760 Died)
- Scipione Ardoino Alcontres, C.R. (19 Dec 1767 – 17 June 1771)
- Emanuello Rao-Torres (18 Dec 1771 – 14 April 1778 Died)
- Carlo Santacolomba (1780 – 13 July 1801 Died)
- Alfonso Airoldi (1803 – 25 March 1817 Died)
- Gabriello Maria Gravina, O.S.B. (Jan 1818 – 18 April 1840 Died)
- Giacomo Coccia (15 Sep 1818 – 4 June 1829 Died)
- Ignazio Avolio (1834 – 22 Feb 1844 Resigned)
- Paolo Maria Mondio (1850 – 4 Sep 1857 Died)
- Ignazio Carlo Vittore Papardo del Parco, C.R. (27 Sep 1858 – 1871)
- Gaetano Blandini (12 Aug 1880 – 1883)
- Stefano Gerbino di Cannitello, O.S.B. (3 June 1890 – 1895)
- Giuseppe Fiorenza (15 Dec 1895 – 1896)
- Vincenzo Di Giovanni (21 Oct 1896 – 1901)
- Salvatore Ballo Guercio (8 March 1920 – 1933)
- Antonio Mantiero (11 June 1935 – 1936)
- Luciano Geraci (6 March 1937 – 20 July 1946 Died)
- Luigi Cammarata (4 Dec 1946 – 24 Feb 1950 Died)
- Guido Tonetti (25 July 1950 – 1957)
- Francesco Ricceri (16 March 1957 – 15 May 1961), next Bishop of Trapani)
- Francesco Tortora, O.M. (19 Mar 1962 – 21 Oct 1972), next Bishop of Gerace-Locri)
- Ignazio Cannavò (20 Dec 1976 – 30 Sep 1986), next Archbishop of Messina-Lipari-Santa Lucia del Mela.

== See also ==
- List of Catholic dioceses in Italy

== Bibliography ==
- Amico, Vito (1855). Dizionario topografico della Sicilia (in Italian), Volume 1 (Palermo: Tip. Pietro Morvillo, 1855.) Pp. 626-628.
- D'Avino, Vincenzio (1848). Cenni storici sulle chiese arcivescovili, vescovili, e prelatizie (nullius) del regno delle due Sicilie (in Italian). Naples: dalle stampe di Ranucci. pp. 612–613.
- De Ciocchis, Giovanni Angelo (1743). Sacrae regiae visitationis per Siciliam a Joanne-Ang. De Ciocchis, Caroli III. regis jussu acta decretaque omnia: Vol II: Vallis Nemorum, (in Latin) Palermo: Ex typographia Diarii literarii, 1836.
- Pirro, Rocco (1733). Antonino Mongitore (ed.). Sicilia sacra disquisitionibus et notitiis illustrata. Vol. Tomus secundus (third ed.). haeredes P. Coppulae. pp. 1334–1345.
- Savagnone, F. Guglielmo (1912). "Concili e sinodi di Sicilia," (in Italian), in: Atti della reale Accademia di scienze, lettere e belle arti di Palermo terza serie, Vol. 9. Palermo: Impresa generale d'Affissione e Publicità, 1912. pp. 3-212 + Appendice.

=== External links ===
- David M. Cheney, Catholic-Hierarchy.org, "Territorial Prelature of Santa Lucia del Mela;" retrieved: 4 November 2025.
- Gabriel Chow, GCatholic.org, "Former Territorial Prelature of Santa Lucia del Mela;" retrieved: 4 November 2025.
