= Antonio Franco (blessed) =

Beatified Roman-Catholic bishop

Blessed Antonio Franco
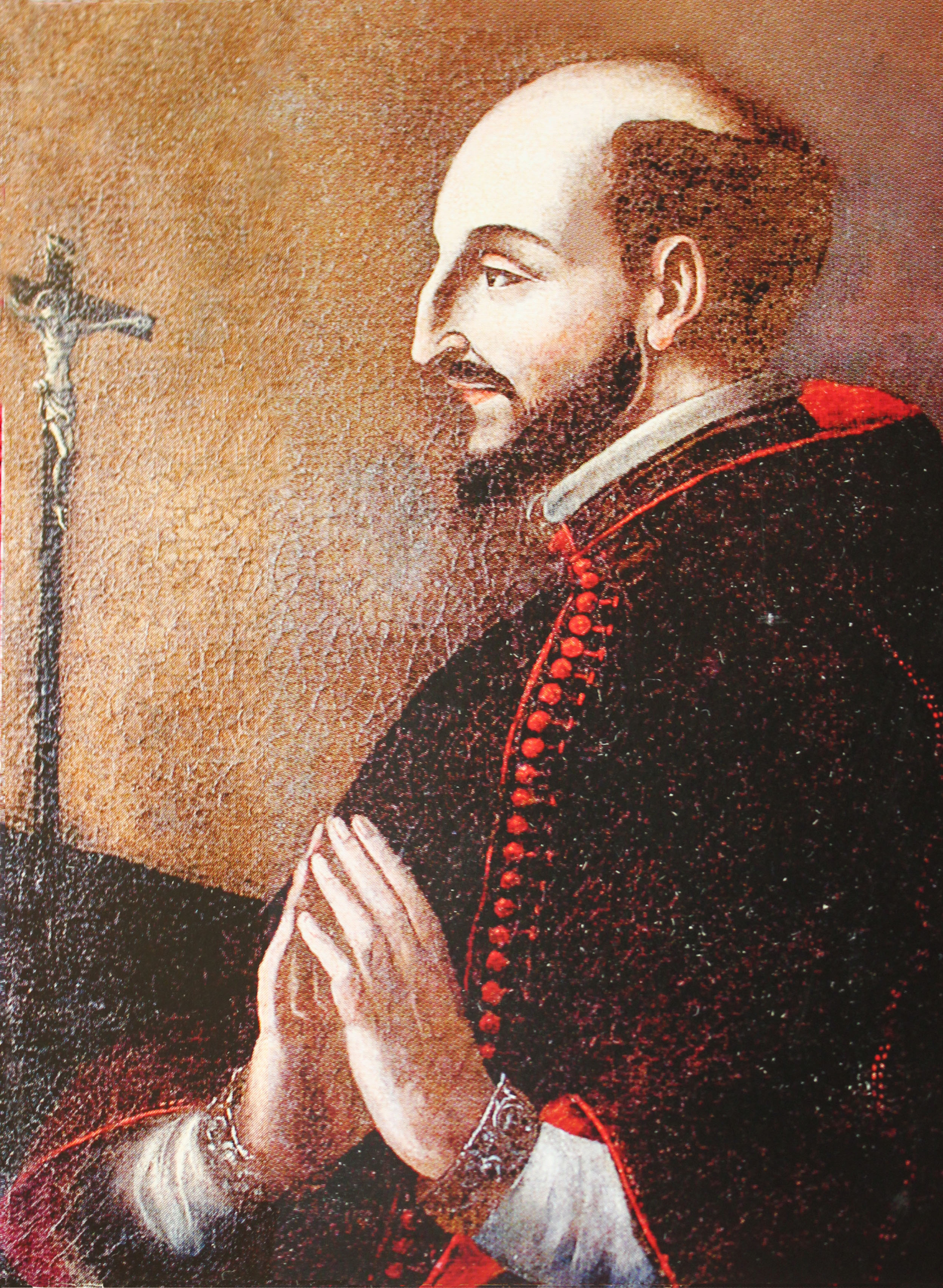
- Born: 26 September 1585; Naples, Campania, Italy
- Died: 2 September 1626 (aged 41); Santa Lucia del Mela, Messina, Italy
- Resting place: Basilica of Santa Lucia del Mela, Messina, Sicily, Italy
- Venerated in: Roman Catholic Church
- Beatified: 2 September 2013, Santa Lucia del Mela, Messina, Italy by Cardinal Angelo Amato
- Feast: 2 September
- Attributes: Episcopal attire Crozier

Antonio Franco (26 September 1585 – 2 September 1626) was an Italian Catholic priest and prelate of Santa Lucia del Mela. Franco was beatified in 2013 when a miracle was discovered to have been performed through his intercession. Cardinal Angelo Amato beatified him on behalf of Pope Francis.

== Biography ==
Franco was born in 1585 in Naples to a noble family of French origins. He was born as the third of six children to Orlando Franco and Francesca Pisana di Antonio. Franco studied theology and obtained a doctorate in civil and canon law on 23 September 1602 and he later pursued further studies at the behest of his father in Rome. But he would move to Madrid to serve at the royal court at the insistence of his parents.

He was ordained to the priesthood in 1610 and he asked King Philip III to be a member of his court. On 14 January 1611 he was named a royal chaplain and Franco was later appointed as major chaplain of the Kingdom of Sicily in 1616. With that appointment came the Prelature of Santa Lucia del Mela. When Franco was in Rome, Pope Paul V confirmed the appointment. He was formally installed in 1617.

Franco was regarded as a man of holiness who lived with deprivations to life. He didn't eat much and he slept on the floor. He wore two chains all the time. He died at the age of 41 due to his deprivations and his remains were deemed to be incorrupt. He is buried in the Basilica of Santa Lucia del Mela.

== Beatification ==
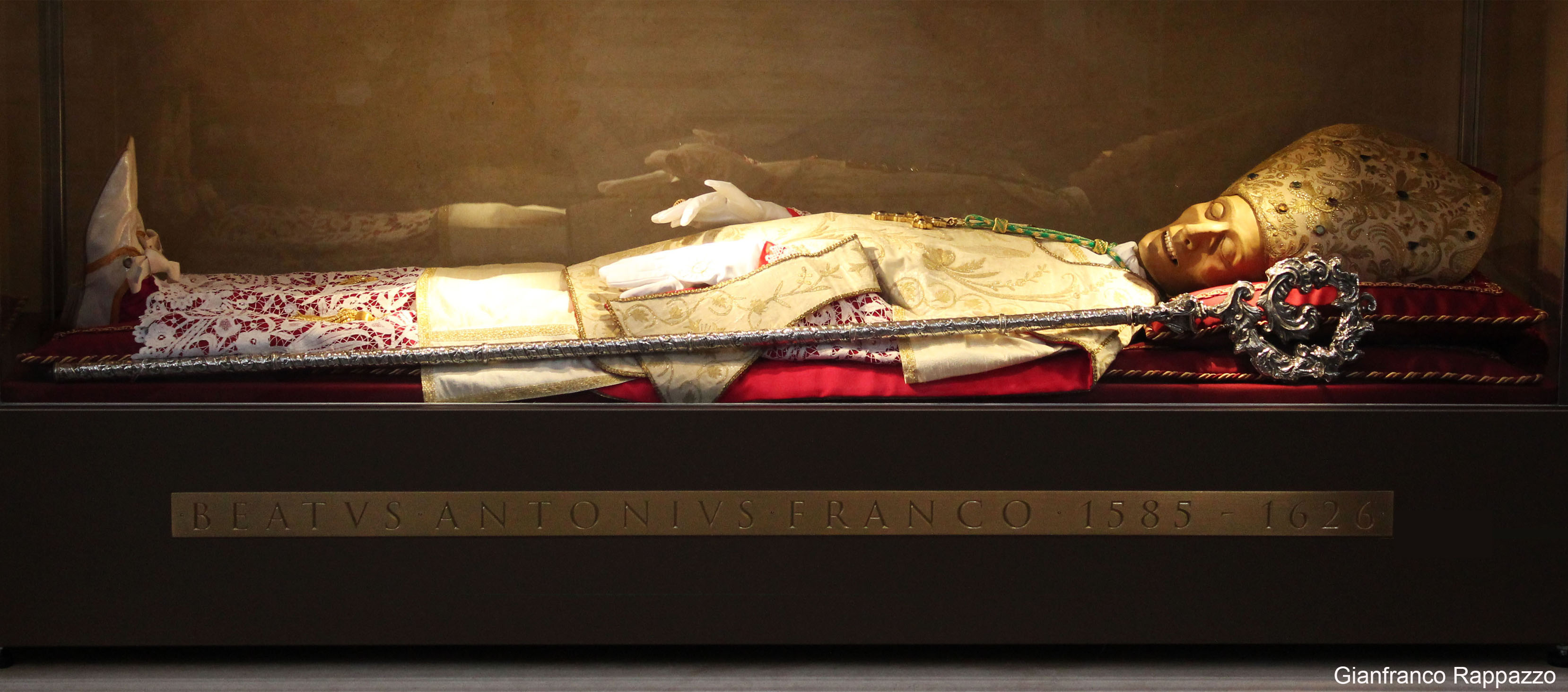
Reliquary containing the incorrupt body of Antonio Franco

The cause of beatification for Franco commenced on 11 April 1984 under Pope John Paul II with the declaration of nihil obstat - this stated there were no objections to the commencement of the cause. That meant he could be made a Servant of God. Pope Benedict XVI declared him to have lived a life of heroic virtue and proclaimed him to be venerable on 14 January 2011. He later approved a decree ratifying the existence of a miracle on 20 December 2012 leading to his beatification.

He was beatified on 2 September 2013 by Cardinal Angelo Amato.

== External links and additional sources ==
- Hagiography Circle
- Saints SQPN
- Cheney, David M. "Territorial Prelature of Santa Lucia del Mela". Catholic-Hierarchy.org. (for Chronology of Bishops) ^{[self-published]}
- Chow, Gabriel. "Territorial Prelature of Santa Lucia del Mela (Italy)". GCatholic.org. (for Chronology of Bishops) ^{[self-published]}

Catholic Church titles
Preceded by Simone Rao Grimaldi	Prelate of Santa Lucia del Mela; 1616-1626	Succeeded by Vincenzo Fimratura
