= Fulci =

Fulci is an Italian surname. Notable people with the surname include:

- Ludovico Fulci (1850–1934), Italian lawyer and professor
- Lucio Fulci (1927–1996), Italian film director
- Francesco Paolo Fulci (1931–2022), Italian diplomat
- Fulci (band), an Italian death metal band
