= Simone Rao Grimaldi =

Most Reverend Simone Rao Grimaldi
- Prelate of Santa Lucia del Mela
- Church: Catholic Church
- Diocese: Territorial Prelature of Santa Lucia del Mela
- In office: 1602–1616
- Predecessor: Juan d'Espinar
- Successor: Antonio Franco (bishop)

Personal details
- Died: 12 March 1616 Santa Lucia del Mela, Italy

Simone Rao Grimaldi (died 12 March 1616) was a Roman Catholic bishop who served as Prelate of Santa Lucia del Mela (1602–1616).

== Biography ==
On 15 Aug 1602, Simone Rao Grimaldi was appointed by Pope Clement VIII as Bishop of the Territorial Prelature of Santa Lucia del Mela. He served as Prelate of Santa Lucia del Mela until his death on 12 Mar 1616.

== External links and additional sources ==
- Cheney, David M. "Territorial Prelature of Santa Lucia del Mela". Catholic-Hierarchy.org. (for Chronology of Bishops) ^{[self-published]}
- Chow, Gabriel. "Territorial Prelature of Santa Lucia del Mela (Italy)". GCatholic.org. (for Chronology of Bishops) ^{[self-published]}

Catholic Church titles
Preceded by Juan d'Espinar	Prelate of Santa Lucia del Mela; 1602–1616	Succeeded by Antonio Franco (blessed)
