= Martino La Farina =

Most Reverend Martino La Farina
- Prelate of Santa Lucia del Mela
- Church: Catholic Church
- Diocese: Territorial Prelature of Santa Lucia del Mela
- In office: 1648–1668
- Predecessor: Vincenzo Fimratura
- Successor: Simone Impellizzeri

Personal details
- Died: 17 September 1668 Santa Lucia del Mela, Italy

Martino La Farina (died 17 September 1668) was a Roman Catholic bishop who served as Prelate of Santa Lucia del Mela (1648–1668).

== Biography ==
On 21 September 1648, Martino La Farina was appointed by Pope Innocent X as Bishop of the Territorial Prelature of Santa Lucia del Mela. He served as Prelate of Santa Lucia del Mela until his death on 17 September 1668.

== External links and additional sources ==
- Cheney, David M. "Territorial Prelature of Santa Lucia del Mela". Catholic-Hierarchy.org. (for Chronology of Bishops) ^{[self-published]}
- Chow, Gabriel. "Territorial Prelature of Santa Lucia del Mela (Italy)". GCatholic.org. (for Chronology of Bishops) ^{[self-published]}

Catholic Church titles
Preceded by Vincenzo Fimratura	Prelate of Santa Lucia del Mela; 1648–1668	Succeeded by Simone Impellizzeri
