= Simone Impellizzeri =

Italian Roman Catholic bishop

Most Reverend Simone Impellizzeri
- Prelate of Santa Lucia del Mela
- Church: Catholic Church
- Diocese: Territorial Prelature of Santa Lucia del Mela
- In office: 1670–1701
- Predecessor: Martino La Farina
- Successor: Carlo Massa

Personal details
- Died: August 1701 Santa Lucia del Mela, Italy

Simone Impellizzeri (died August 1701) was a Roman Catholic bishop who served as Prelate of Santa Lucia del Mela (1670–1701).

== Biography ==
Impellizzeri was a native of Noto (Sicily). On 29 July 1670, Simone Impellizzeri was appointed by Pope Clement X as Bishop of the Territorial Prelature of Santa Lucia del Mela. He served as Prelate of Santa Lucia del Mela until his death in August 1701.

== External links and additional sources ==
- Cheney, David M. "Territorial Prelature of Santa Lucia del Mela". Catholic-Hierarchy.org. (for Chronology of Bishops) ^{[self-published]}
- Chow, Gabriel. "Territorial Prelature of Santa Lucia del Mela (Italy)". GCatholic.org. (for Chronology of Bishops) ^{[self-published]}

Catholic Church titles
Preceded by Martino La Farina	Prelate of Santa Lucia del Mela; 1670–1701	Succeeded by Carlo Massa
