= Girolamo Riggio =

Most Reverend Vincenzo Fimratura
- Prelate of Santa Lucia del Mela
- Church: Catholic Church
- Diocese: Territorial Prelature of Santa Lucia del Mela
- In office: 1585–1589
- Successor: Juan d'Espinar

Personal details
- Died: 1589 Santa Lucia del Mela, Italy

Girolamo Riggio (died 1589) was a Roman Catholic priest who served as Prelate of Santa Lucia del Mela (1585–1589).

In 1585, Girolamo Riggio was appointed by Pope Sixtus V as Prelate of Santa Lucia del Mela. He served as Prelate of Santa Lucia del Mela until his death in 1589.

== External links and additional sources ==
- Cheney, David M. "Territorial Prelature of Santa Lucia del Mela". Catholic-Hierarchy.org. (for Chronology of Bishops) ^{[self-published]}
- Chow, Gabriel. "Territorial Prelature of Santa Lucia del Mela (Italy)". GCatholic.org. (for Chronology of Bishops) ^{[self-published]}

Catholic Church titles
Preceded by	Prelate of Santa Lucia del Mela; 1585–1589	Succeeded by Juan d'Espinar
