= Alì Terme =

Commune in Messina, Italy

- Comune
- Comune di Alì Terme
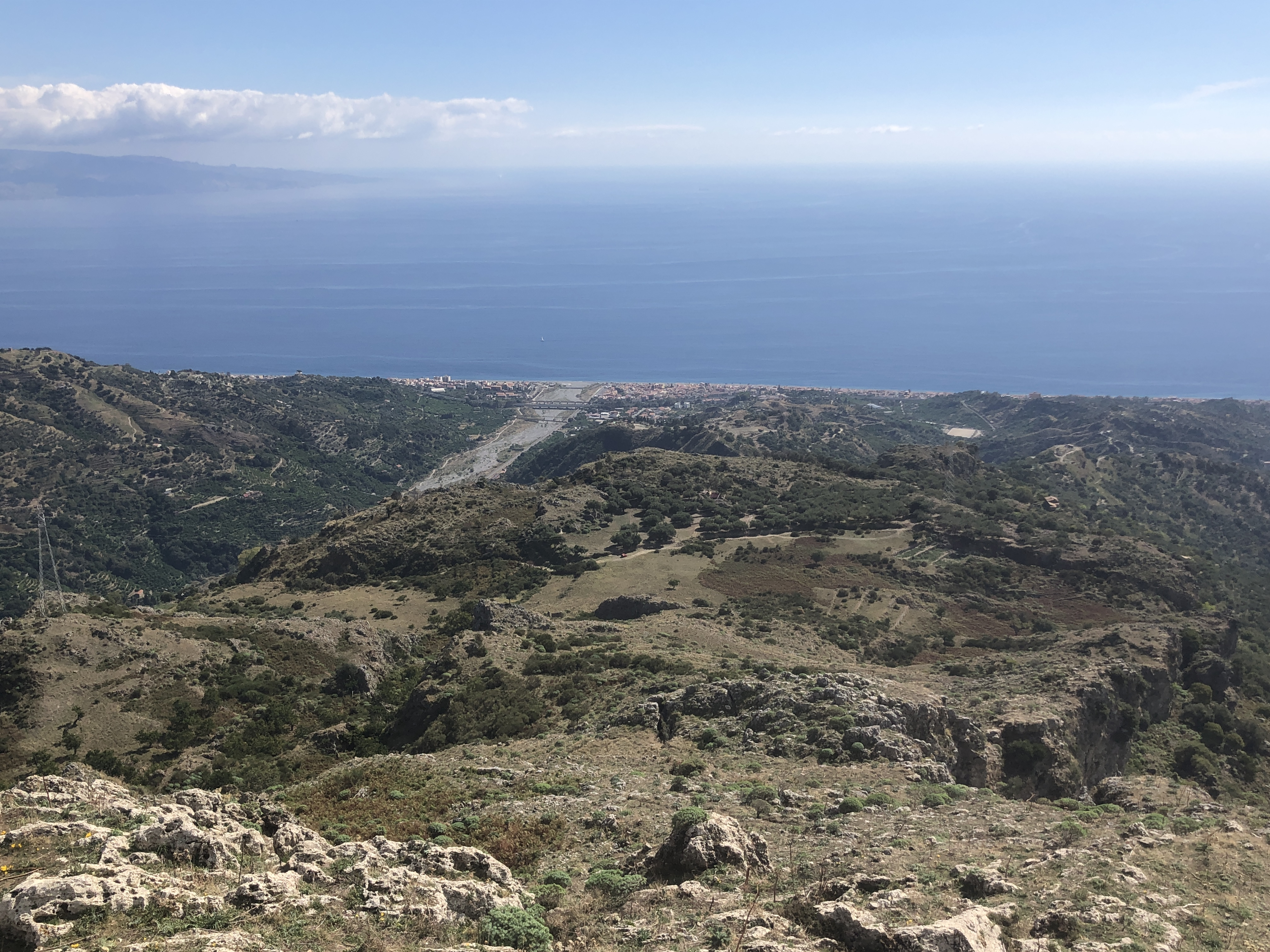
- Panoramic view from Belvedere Castle

- Location of Alì Terme in Italy Alì Terme (Sicily)
- Coordinates: 38°0′N 15°25′E
- Country: Italy
- Region: Sicily
- Metropolitan city: Messina (ME)

Government
  - Mayor: Carlo Giaquinta

Area
  - Total: 6.2 km^{2} (2.4 sq mi)
- Elevation: 9 m (30 ft)

Population (30 June 2025)
  - Total: 2,317
  - Density: 370/km^{2} (970/sq mi)
- Demonym: Aliesi
- Time zone: UTC+1 (CET)
  - Summer (DST): UTC+2 (CEST)
- Postal code: 98021
- Dialing code: 0942
- Website: www.comune.aliterme.me.it

Alì Terme is a comune (municipality) in the Metropolitan City of Messina in the Italian region Sicily, located about 180 kilometres (110 mi) east of Palermo and about 25 kilometres (16 mi) southwest of Messina.

Alì Terme borders the following municipalities: Alì, Fiumedinisi, Itala, Nizza di Sicilia.

== Monuments and places of interest ==
=== Religious architecture ===
- Mother Church of San Rocco: this is the town's main church, dedicated to its patron saint, whose cult originated several centuries ago with the discovery of a statue of him in a box on the beach. The current building, which replaced the much older, still-existing one, was built in the style of Monsignor Paino [unclear] and inaugurated in 1956. The patron saint is solemnly celebrated on 16 August, the day of the procession.
- Sanctuary of "Maria Ausiliatrice": located within the institute of the Daughters of Mary Help of Christians, it houses the mortal remains of Mother Maddalena Morano, proclaimed blessed by Pope John Paul II in 1994, and perpetuates the cult of Our Lady Help of Christians, solemnly celebrated on 24 May, the day of the procession.

== Demographic evolution ==
Historical population

Year	Pop.	±%
1861	777	—
1871	727	−6.4%
1881	869	+19.5%
1901	1,785	+105.4%
1911	1,941	+8.7%
1921	2,266	+16.7%

Year	Pop.	±%
1931	2,204	−2.7%
1936	2,231	+1.2%
1951	2,230	−0.0%
1961	2,309	+3.5%
1971	2,291	−0.8%
1981	2,276	−0.7%

Year	Pop.	±%
1991	2,425	+6.5%
2001	2,569	+5.9%
2011	2,567	−0.1%
2021	2,369	−7.7%

Source: Data from ISTAT

=== Foreign ethnicities and minorities ===
As of 31 December 2024, foreigners residents in the municipality were 51, i.e. 2.1% of the population. The largest foreign community is that from Romania, with 42.9% of all foreigners present in the country

== Economy ==
Alì Terme is a seaside resort and spa. Its main economic activities are based on tourism, agriculture, and crafts, particularly copper and wrought iron. The ancient artisanal production of straw hats is still widespread.

== Infrastructure and transport ==
The municipality is crossed by the A18 Messina-Catania motorway and the 114 state road. It is also served by the Alì Terme station on the Messina-Catania-Syracuse railway.

== Notable people ==
- Stefano D'Arrigo (1919–1992) Italian writer
- Maddalena Caterina Morano (1847–1908) Italian Roman Catholic professed religious
