= Nizza di Sicilia =

- Comune
- Comune di Nizza di Sicilia
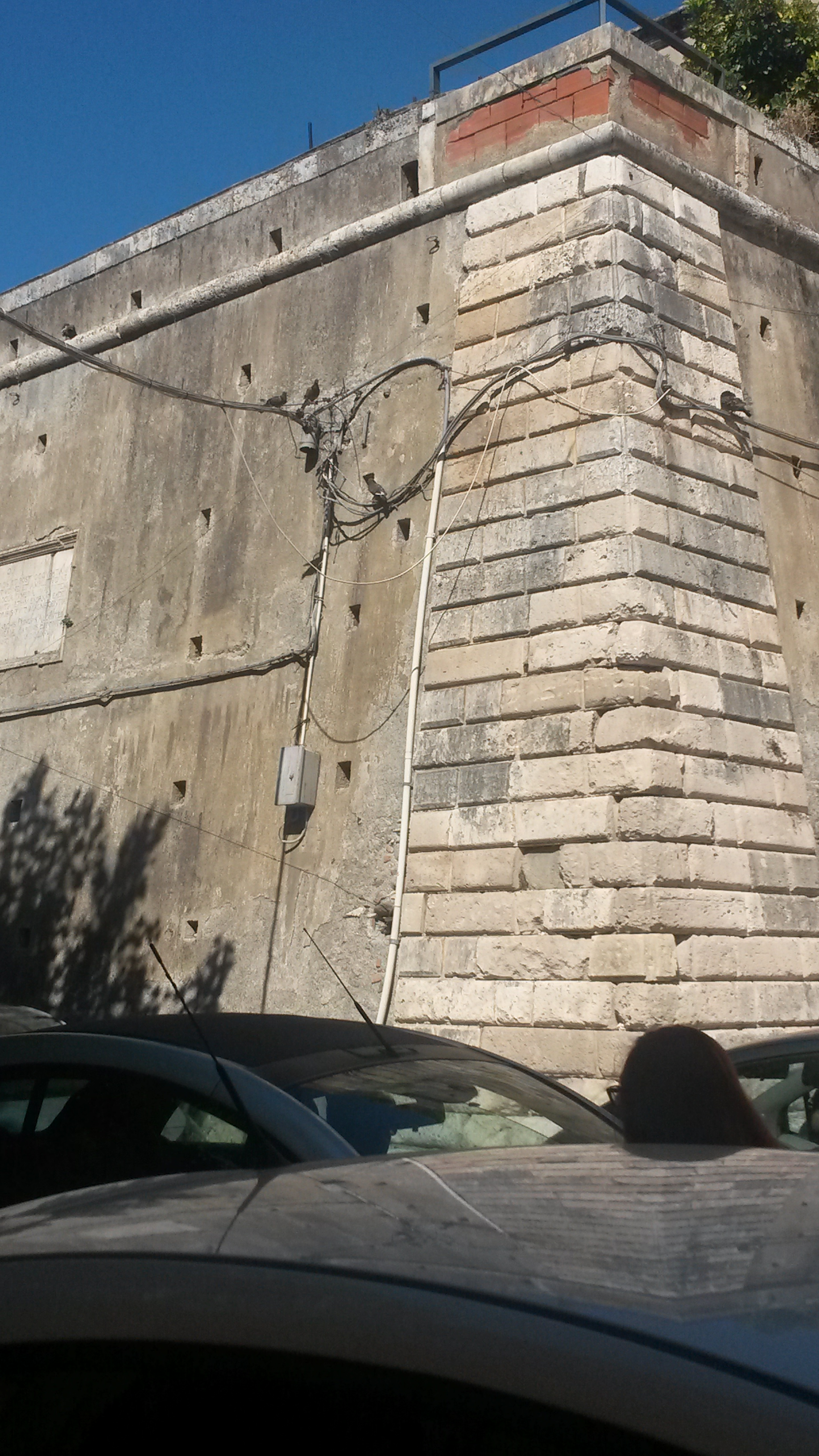
- View of the castle.

- Location within Italy Location within Sicily
- Coordinates: 37°59′N 15°24′E
- Country: Italy
- Region: Sicily
- Metropolitan city: Messina (ME)

Government
  - Mayor: Pietro Briguglio

Area
  - Total: 13.2 km^{2} (5.1 sq mi)
- Elevation: 9 m (30 ft)

Population (30 November 2011)
  - Total: 3,764
  - Density: 285/km^{2} (739/sq mi)
- Demonym: Nizzardi
- Time zone: UTC+1 (CET)
  - Summer (DST): UTC+2 (CEST)
- Postal code: 98026
- Dialing code: 0942
- Website: Official website

Nizza di Sicilia is a comune (municipality) in the Metropolitan City of Messina in the Italian region Sicily, located about 180 kilometres (110 mi) east of Palermo and about 25 kilometres (16 mi) southwest of Messina.

Nizza di Sicilia borders the following municipalities: Alì Terme, Fiumedinisi, Mandanici, Roccalumera.
