= San Pier Niceto =

San Pier Niceto Σαν Πιέρ Νικέτο
- Comune
- Comune di San Pier Niceto
- Location within Italy Location within Sicily
- Coordinates: 38°10′N 15°21′E
- Country: Italy
- Region: Sicily
- Metropolitan city: Messina (ME)
- Frazioni: San Pier Marina, Serro, Zifronte, Pirrera

Area
  - Total: 36.3 km^{2} (14.0 sq mi)
- Elevation: 260 m (850 ft)

Population (Dec. 2004)
  - Total: 3,084
  - Density: 85.0/km^{2} (220/sq mi)
- Demonym: Sanpietresi
- Time zone: UTC+1 (CET)
  - Summer (DST): UTC+2 (CEST)
- Postal code: 98045
- Dialing code: 090
- Patron saint: San Pietro
- Saint day: June 29
- Website: Official website

San Pier Niceto (Sicilian: Sanpèri) is a comune (municipality) in the Province of Messina in the Italian region Sicily, located about 170 kilometres (110 mi) east of Palermo and about 20 kilometres (12 mi) west of Messina. As of 31 December 2004, it had a population of 3,084 and an area of 36.3 square kilometres (14.0 mi^{2}).

The municipality of San Pier Niceto contains the frazioni (subdivisions, mainly villages and hamlets) San Pier Marina, Serro, Zifronte, and Pirrera.

San Pier Niceto borders the following municipalities: Condrò, Fiumedinisi, Gualtieri Sicaminò, Monforte San Giorgio, Pace del Mela, Santa Lucia del Mela.

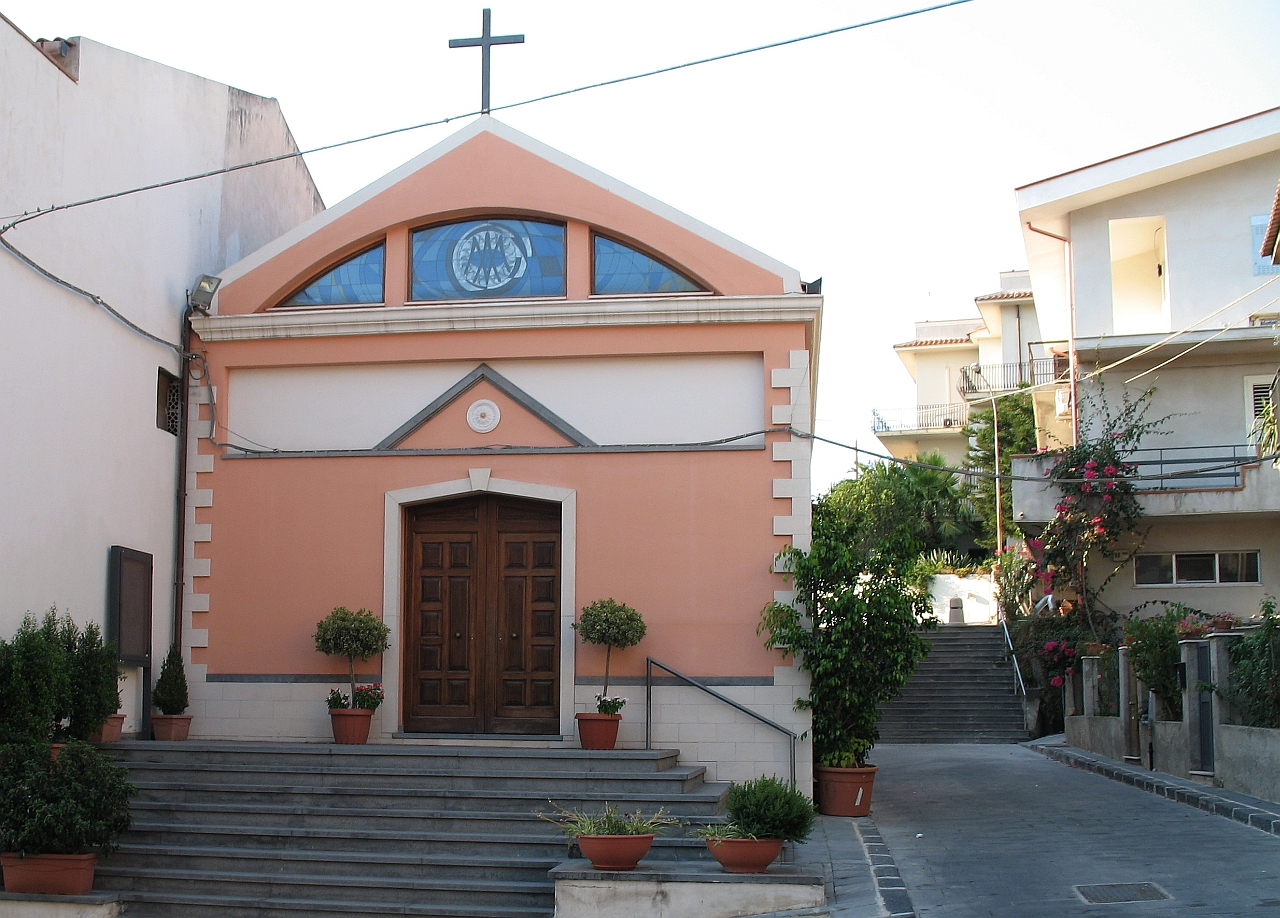
Chiesa Maria Immacolata - San Pier marina

== Demographic evolution ==
Historical population

Year	Pop.	±%
1861	4,683	—
1871	5,049	+7.8%
1881	5,063	+0.3%
1901	5,450	+7.6%
1911	4,616	−15.3%

Year	Pop.	±%
1921	5,148	+11.5%
1931	5,250	+2.0%
1936	5,246	−0.1%
1951	4,733	−9.8%
1961	3,847	−18.7%

Year	Pop.	±%
1971	3,380	−12.1%
1981	3,213	−4.9%
1991	3,122	−2.8%
2001	3,085	−1.2%

Source: Data from ISTAT
