= Condrò =

- Comune
- Comune di Condrò
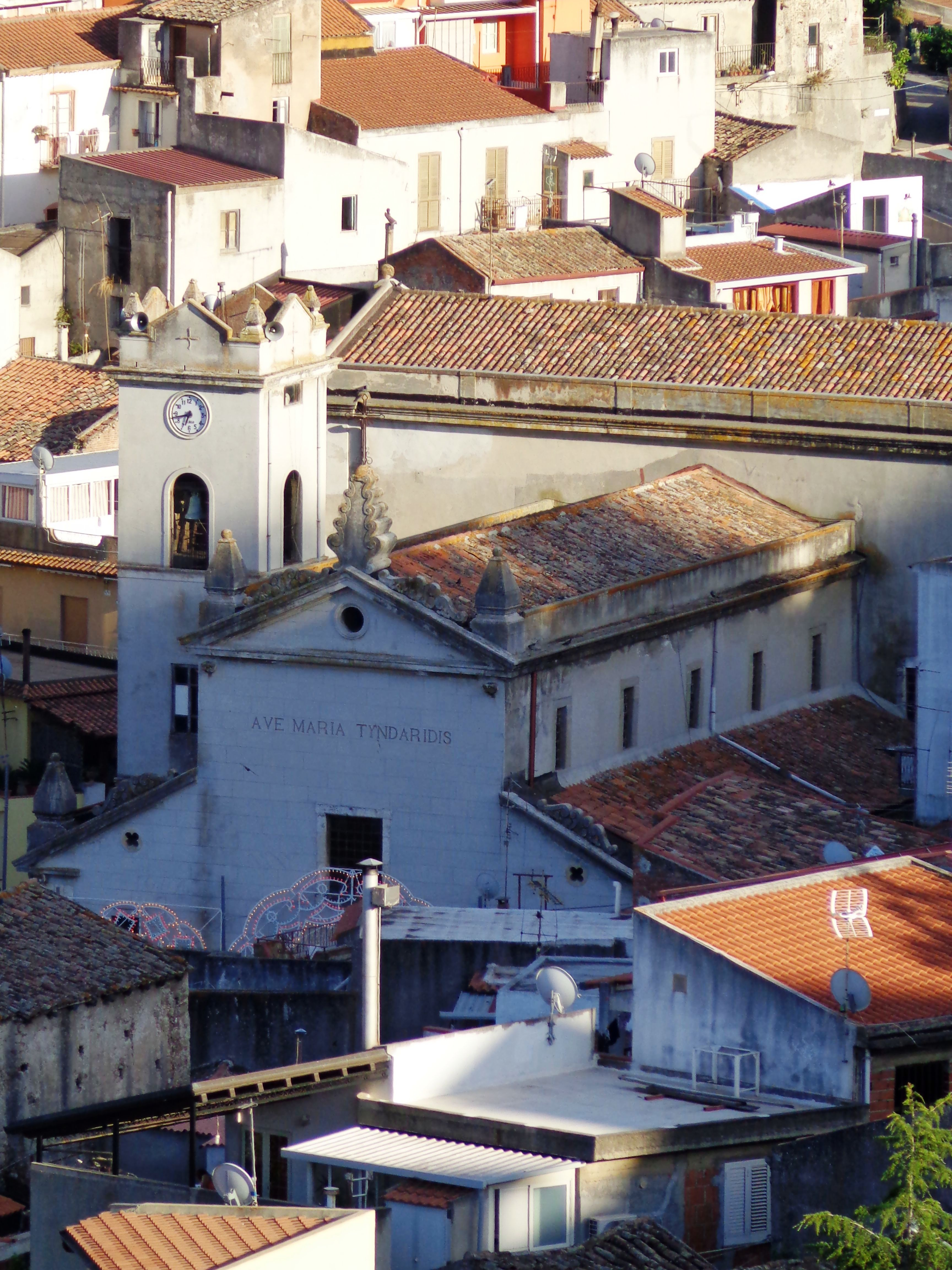

- Coat of arms

- Location within Italy Location within Sicily
- Coordinates: 38°10′N 15°20′E
- Country: Italy
- Region: Sicily
- Metropolitan city: Messina (ME)

Government
  - Mayor: Salvatore Antonio Campagna

Area
  - Total: 5.2 km^{2} (2.0 sq mi)
- Elevation: 58 m (190 ft)

Population (31 December 2011)
  - Total: 488
  - Density: 94/km^{2} (240/sq mi)
- Demonym: Condronesi
- Time zone: UTC+1 (CET)
  - Summer (DST): UTC+2 (CEST)
- Postal code: 98040
- Dialing code: 090
- Website: Official website

Condrò (Sicilian: Cundrò) is a comune (municipality) in the Metropolitan City of Messina in the Italian region Sicily, located about 170 kilometres (110 mi) east of Palermo and about 20 kilometres (12 mi) west of Messina.

Condrò borders the following municipalities: Gualtieri Sicaminò, Pace del Mela, San Pier Niceto.
