= Maddalena Caterina Morano =

Blessed Maddalena Caterina Morano F.M.A.
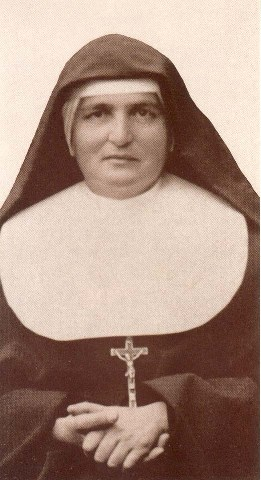
- Prior to 1908.

Religious
- Born: 15 November 1847; Chieri, Turin, Kingdom of Sardinia
- Died: 26 March 1908 (aged 60); Catania, Kingdom of Italy
- Venerated in: Roman Catholic Church
- Beatified: 5 November 1994, Catania, Italy by Pope John Paul II
- Feast: 26 March
- Attributes: Religious habit
- Patronage: Educators; Catechists

Maddalena Caterina Morano (15 November 1847 - 26 March 1908) was an Italian Roman Catholic professed religious who was a member of the Salesian Sisters. Morano served as an educator for her entire life believing it to be her vocation; she served as a catechist in addition to being an educator.

Morano was beatified in Catania on 5 November 1994 during the occasion of the visit of Pope John Paul II to two Sicilian cities.

== Life ==
Maddalena Caterina Morano was born on 15 November 1847 as the sixth of eight children to Francesco Morano. Her father and older sister both died in 1855 after the death of five brothers.

The death of her father and six of her siblings meant that Morano became the sole breadwinner of the household. Her priest uncle guided her studies while she acted as the sole provider for the household. At the age of fourteen, the pastor of Buttigliera d'Asti opened an educational center for children and she was hired as a teacher.

In 1866 she graduated as a teacher and wanted to enter religious life but was denied this due to the dependence her surviving siblings and mother had on her. Despite this she worked for just over a decade until 1878 as a teacher in Montaldo; she also taught catechism in her local parish.

Morano confessed to her mother in 1877 that she wanted to become a nun but her mother could not support herself if Morano left her. At the age of 30, the Vincentians rejected her desire to become a cloistered nun. Morano had enough to insure her mother's future in 1878 and so made it a focus of her aspirations to enter the religious life.

John Bosco accepted her in joining the Salesians and she made her solemn profession on 4 September 1879; the two met as Morano was walking to Buttigliera d'Asti. Bosco dissuaded her from being a cloistered nun and asked Giovanni Cagliero to invite her into Bosco's order. She made her perpetual vows in 1880. In 1881 - at the request of the Archbishop of Catania - tasked her with new work where she would teach as well as wash and cook.

In 1881 she travelled to Trecastagni in Catania and took charge of an existing institute for women; she instilled within it the principles of the Salesians of Don Bosco and the Salesian Sisters. She also opened new homes and set up after-school activities in addition to training new teachers.

Morano died on 26 March 1908 of cancer. At her death there were eighteen Sicilian houses she opened with 142 sisters as well as 20 novices and 9 postulants. Her remains were at Ali Terme in Messina until 12 September 1939 when her remains were transferred to a Messina church the Salesians managed.

== Beatification ==
The beatification process commenced in Catania on 12 July 1935 and spanned until 20 January 1942 in which a collation of documentation was collated in order to attest to Morano's life and her virtues as well as her works in the name of God. A rogatory process was then held in Turin which spanned from 18 February 1936 to 6 July 1936 and another rogatory process in Caracas was held from 14 December 1936 to 28 December 1936. One final process - a supplementary process - was held from 20 November 1947 to 12 July 1952. The apostolic process was dispensed as it was not required.

The decree on all of her writings - vital to investigate her work and spiritual life - was approved and thus signed as being a valid addition to the cause on 29 May 1958.

The Congregation of Rites, under Pope Pius XII, formally opened the cause on 23 April 1942, granting her the posthumous title of Servant of God.

The Congregation of Rites decreed all the processes held were valid and approved them on 19 June 1970. The postulation compiled and submitted the Positio to Rome in 1978 and allowed Pope John Paul II to proclaim her to be Venerable on 1 September 1988 on the account of her life of heroic virtue.

The miracle needed for her beatification was investigated and was decreed to be a valid and thorough investigation on 19 June 1992. The pope approved it in 1994 and allowed for her beatification to be celebrated on 5 November 1994.

The present postulator is Pierluigi Cameroni.
