= Pagliara =

- Comune
- Comune di Pagliara
- Location within Italy Location within Sicily
- Coordinates: 37°59′N 15°22′E
- Country: Italy
- Region: Sicily
- Metropolitan city: Messina (ME)
- Frazioni: Rocchenere, Locadi

Government
  - Mayor: Sebastiano Antonio Gugliotta

Area
  - Total: 14.6 km^{2} (5.6 sq mi)
- Elevation: 200 m (660 ft)

Population (30 November 2011)
  - Total: 1,253
  - Density: 85.8/km^{2} (222/sq mi)
- Demonym: Pagliarini
- Time zone: UTC+1 (CET)
  - Summer (DST): UTC+2 (CEST)
- Postal code: 98020
- Dialing code: 0942
- Patron saint: St. Sebastian
- Saint day: January 20
- Website: Official website

Pagliara (Sicilian: Pagghiara) is a comune (municipality) in the Metropolitan City of Messina in the Italian region Sicily, located about 180 kilometres (110 mi) east of Palermo and about 26 kilometres (16 mi) southwest of Messina.

Pagliara borders the following municipalities: Furci Siculo, Mandanici, Roccalumera, Santa Lucia del Mela.
