= Itala, Sicily =

Comune in Italy

Itala
- Comune
- Comune di Itala
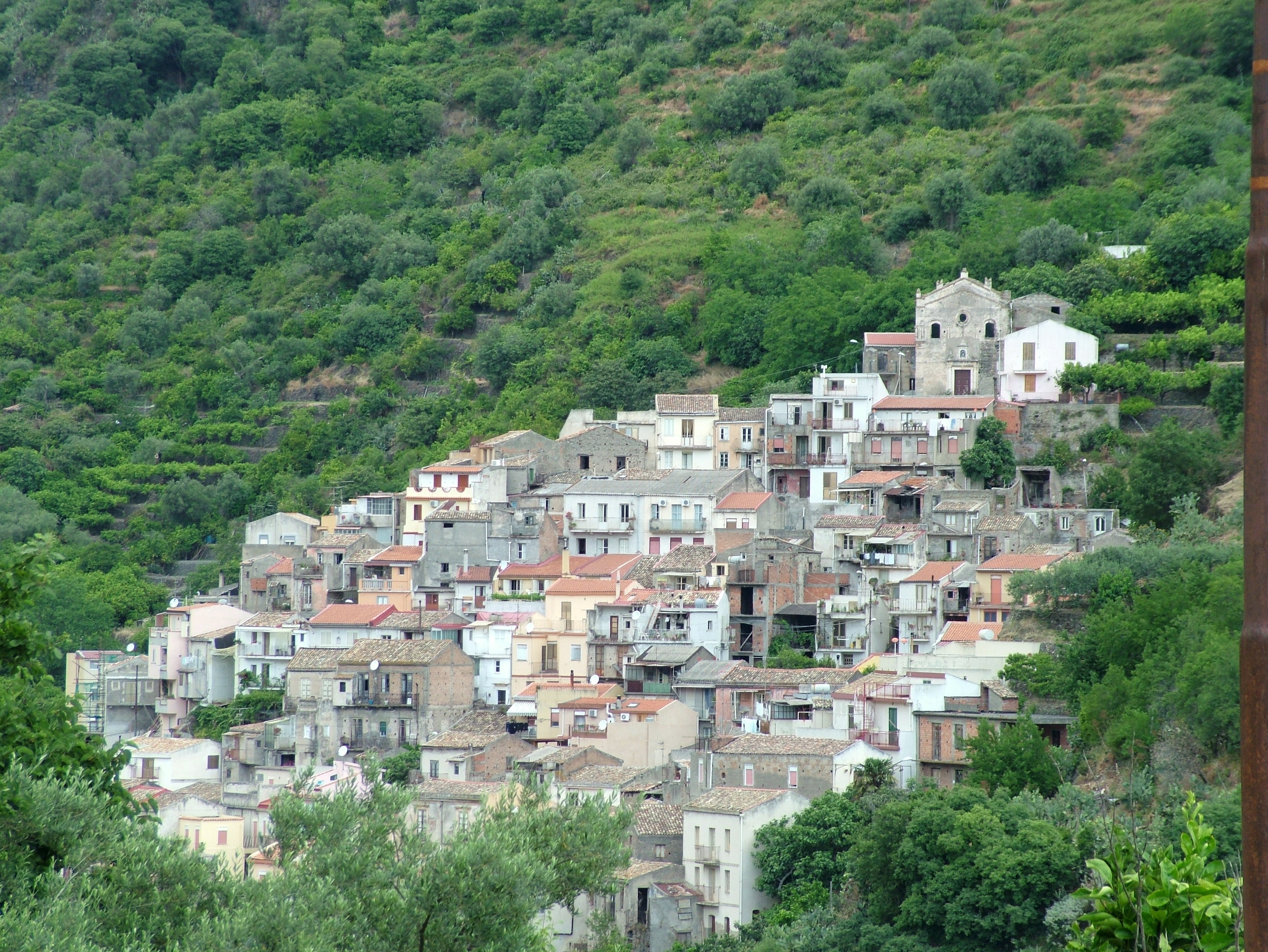
- view

- Location of the municipality of Itala within the metropolitan city of Messina

- Location within Italy Location within Sicily
- Coordinates: 38.05111°N 15.43694°E
- Country: Italy
- Region: Sicily
- Metropolitan city: Messina
- Frazioni: Borgo, Casaleddo, Croce, Mannello, Marina di Itala, Quartiere del Medico (Quartarello)

Government
  - Mayor: Daniele Laudini (lista civica Io amo Itala)
- Elevation: 210 m (690 ft)

Population (31 December 2025)
  - Total: 1,491
- Demonym: italesi
- Time zone: UTC+1 (CET)
  - Summer (DST): UTC+2 (CEST)
- Postal code: 98025
- ISTAT code: 083036
- Patron saint: Madonna della Lettera
- Saint day: June 3
- Website: Official website

Itala is a comune (municipality) of Messina in the Italian region of Sicily and is 22 km from the center of Messina. It was suppressed in 1928 and aggregated into Scaletta Zanclea, from which it regained autonomy in 1947.

Itala borders the following municipalities: Alì, Alì Terme, Fiumedinisi, Messina, Scaletta Zanclea.

== Physical Geography ==
Nestled in the steep hills of the Peloritani mountains, in the shadow of Monte Scuderi, the center of Itala is 2.8 km from the respective hamlets: Marina; Croce; 1.5 km; Borgo; Mannello and Quartarello; 200 m. Marina, which extends for approximately 1.8 km, is connected to Itala Centro by Provincial Road 29 and is crossed by State Road 114 Orientale Sicula.

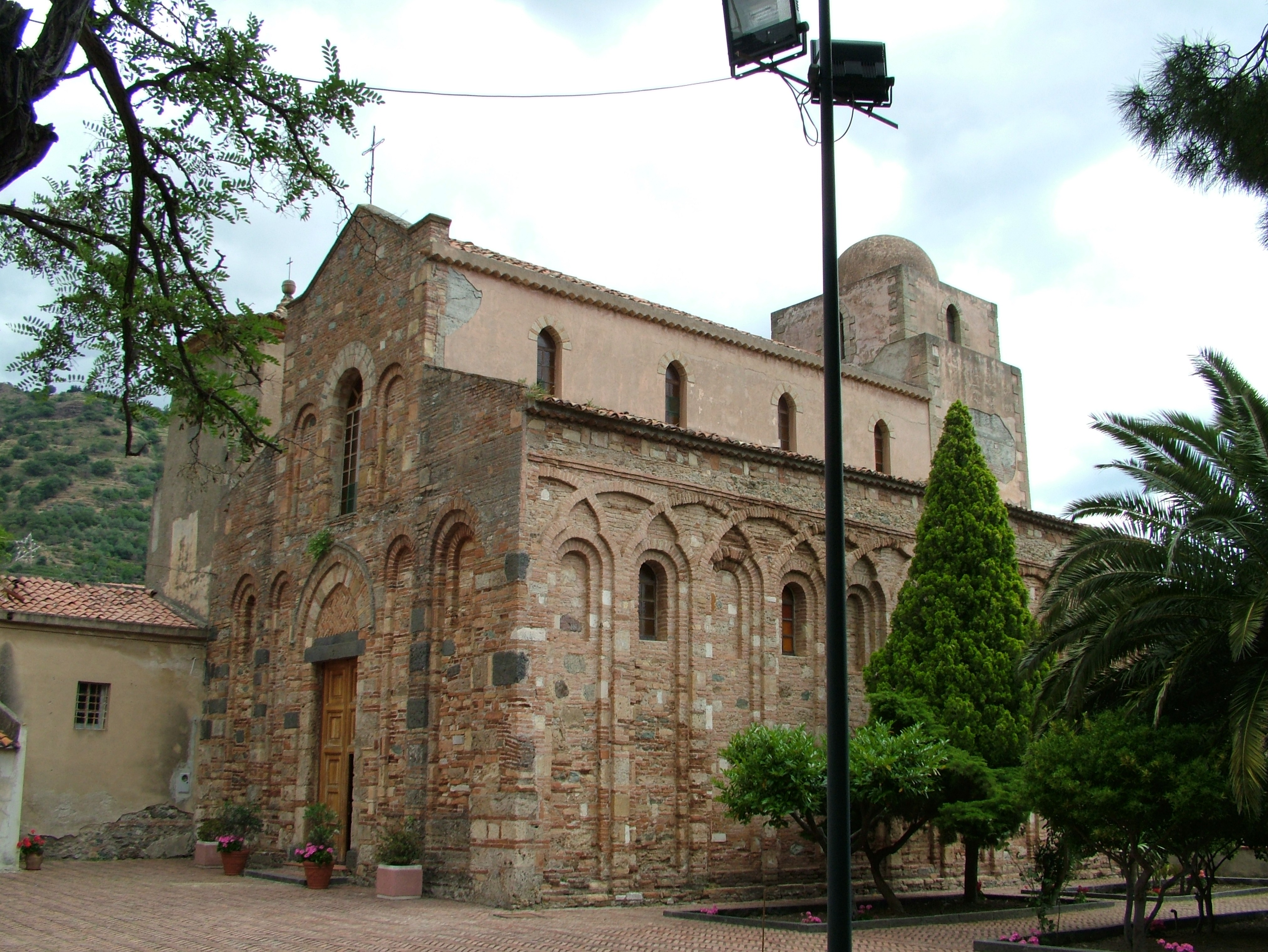
Church of Santi Pietro e Paolo (XI sec.)

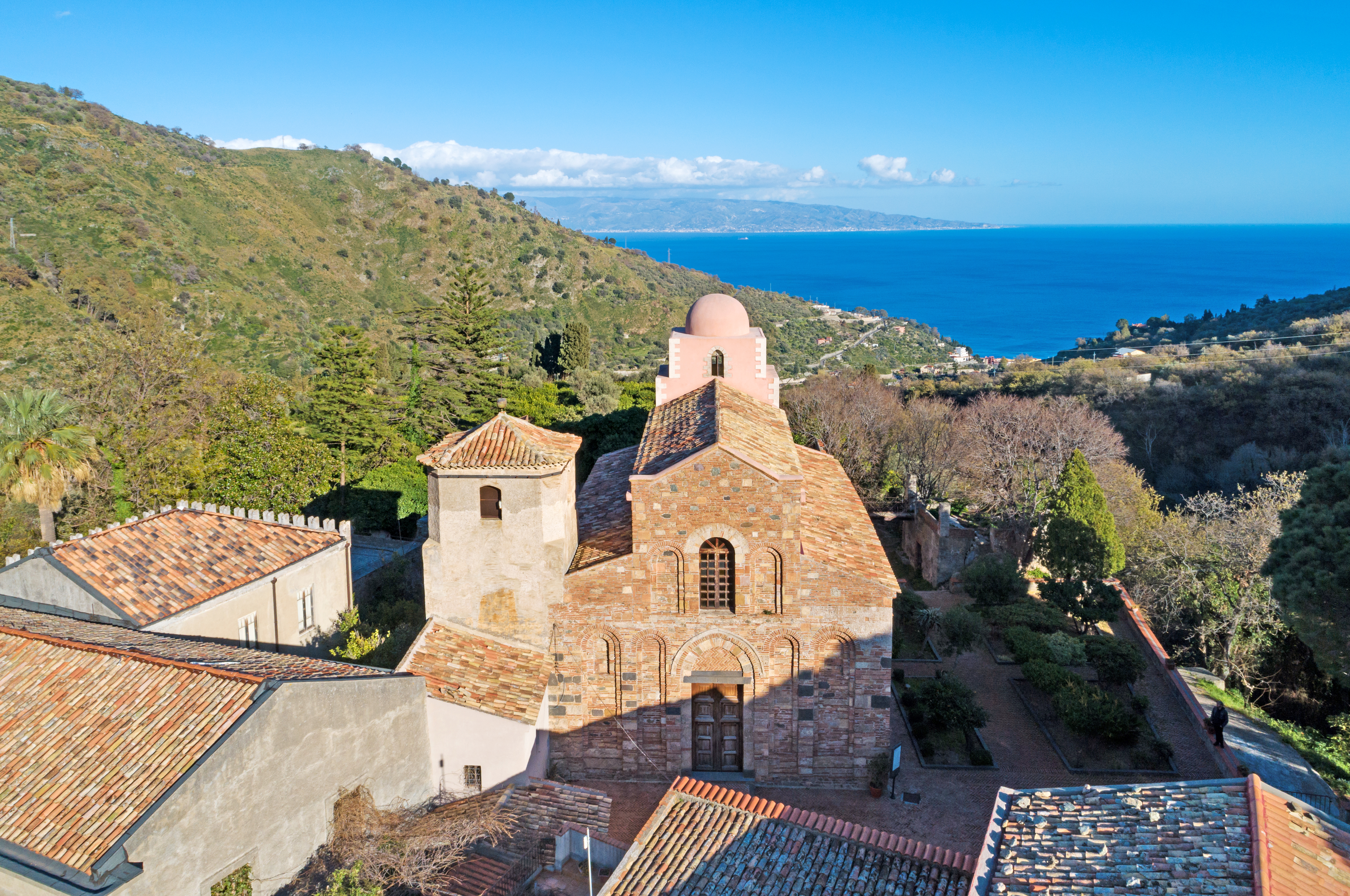
View of the Ionian sea from the church

== Monuments and places of interest ==
=== Religious architecture ===
- Church of Saint Peter and Saint Paul ― Located in the Croce section of Itala and dates from (at least) the 11th century, during the Arab-Norman period.
- Church and Convent of Santa Venera ― Dates back to the seventeenth century.

=== Civil architecture ===
- Town Hall ― The Itala Town Hall is one of the town's most iconic buildings, a symbol of local administration and the bond between the community and its institutions.

=== Nature Reserves ===
Mount Scuderi, part of the Peloritani mountain range, is 1,253 meters high and lies within the municipalities of Fiumedinisi, Itala, and Alì. It is part of the Fiumedinisi and Mount Scuderi Nature Reserve.

== Gallery ==
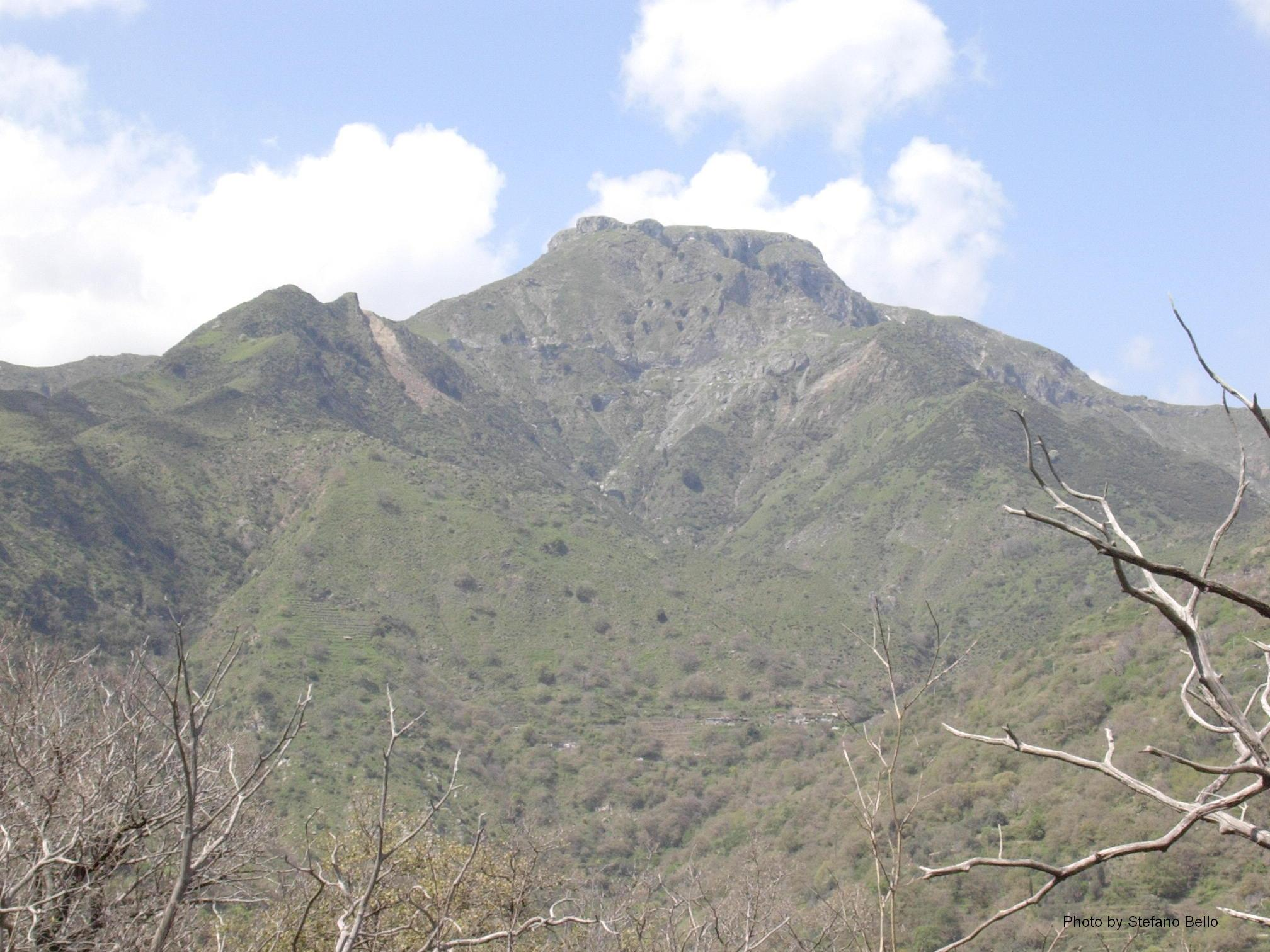
Mount Scuderi seen from Itala

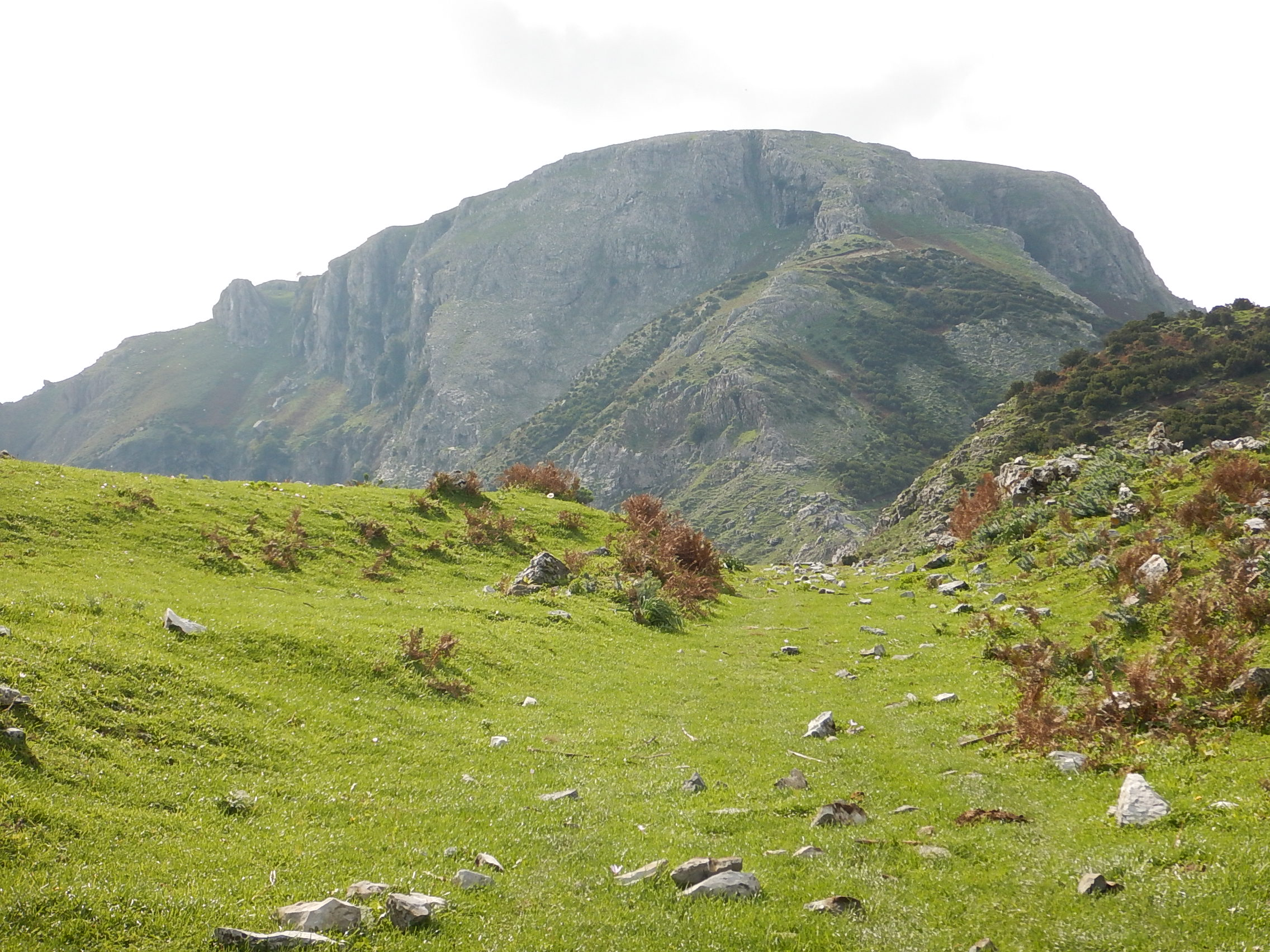
Towards Monte Scuderi

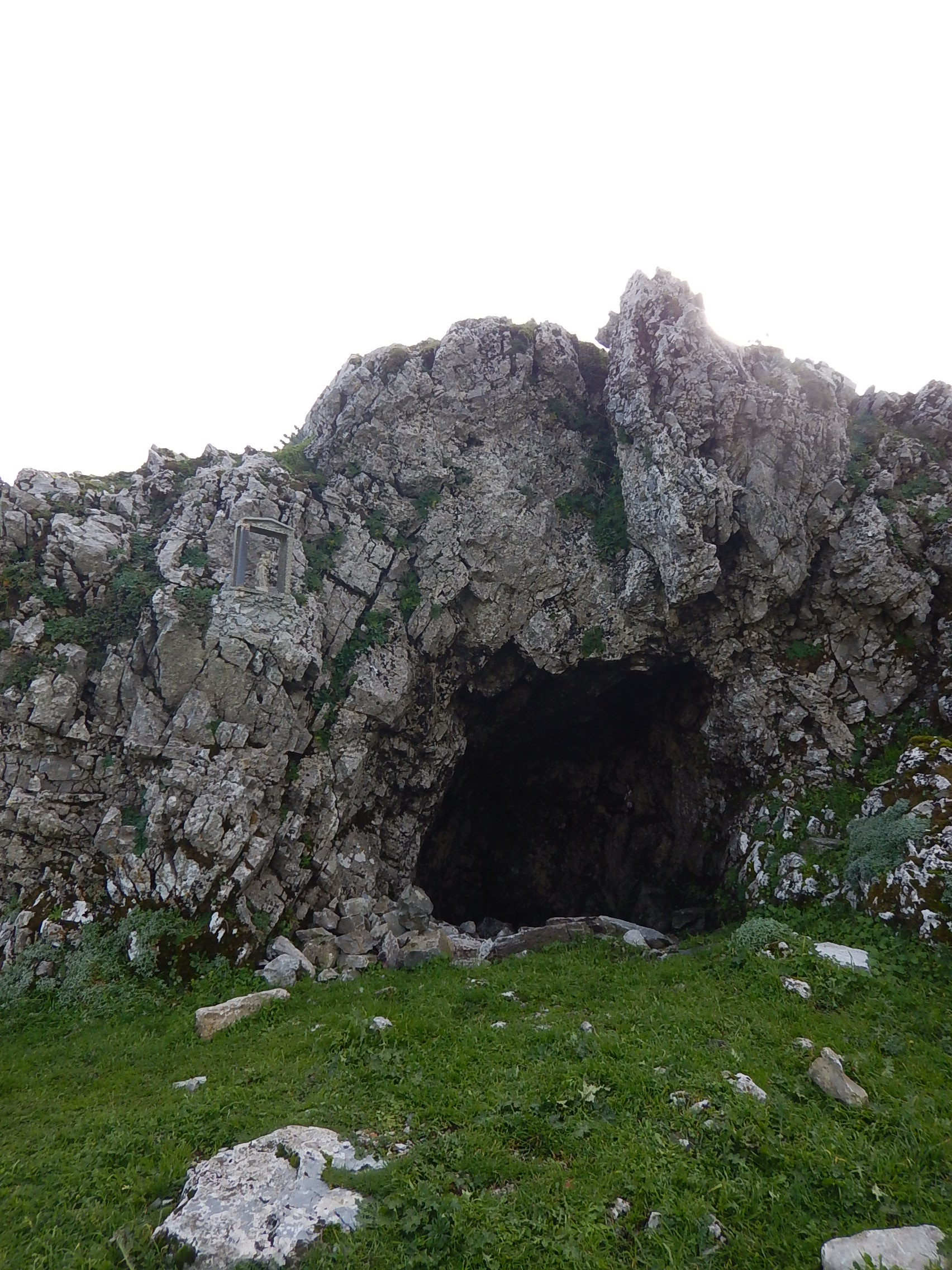
The cave located on the top of Mount Scuderi with the Madonna on the top left

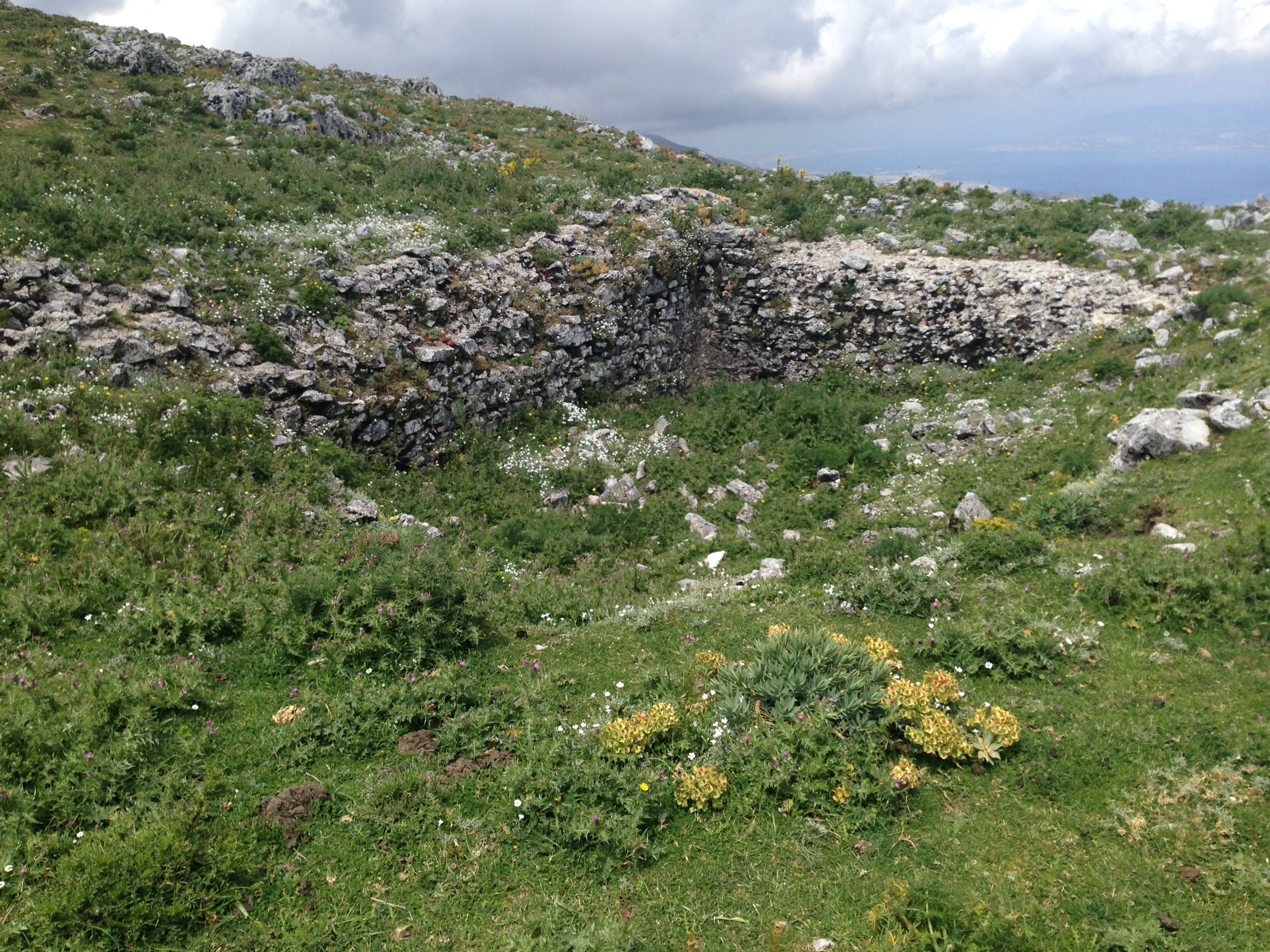
Neviera

== Society ==
=== Demographic evolution ===
Historical population

| Year | Pop. | ±% |
|---|---|---|
| 1861 | 1,836 | — |
| 1871 | 1,945 | +5.9% |
| 1881 | 1,941 | −0.2% |
| 1901 | 2,308 | +18.9% |
| 1911 | 2,437 | +5.6% |
| 1921 | 2,276 | −6.6% |

| Year | Pop. | ±% |
|---|---|---|
| 1931 | 2,368 | +4.0% |
| 1936 | 2,365 | −0.1% |
| 1951 | 2,349 | −0.7% |
| 1961 | 1,976 | −15.9% |
| 1971 | 1,820 | −7.9% |
| 1981 | 1,766 | −3.0% |

| Year | Pop. | ±% |
|---|---|---|
| 1991 | 1,813 | +2.7% |
| 2001 | 1,692 | −6.7% |
| 2011 | 1,663 | −1.7% |
| 2021 | 1,495 | −10.1% |

Source: Data from ISTAT

=== Foreign ethnicities and minorities ===
As of January 1, 2025 foreigners residents in the municipality were 59, i.e. 3.9% of the population. The largest foreign community is that from Brazil, with 32.2% of all foreigners present in the town.

=== Human geography ===
The village is emptying as Sicilians have fewer children and are increasingly emigrating to larger cities or moving abroad.

The municipal administration has joined the "1-euro house" initiative, unanimously embracing the project supported and proposed by a municipal councilor and the Pro Loco Giovannello association, following similar initiatives in other towns in the Metropolitan City of Messina.

== Administration ==
| Period | | Office holder | Party | Title | Notes |
|---|---|---|---|---|---|
| 2012 | 2017 | Antonino Crisafulli | Lista Civica | Mayor | |
| 2017 | 2022 | Antonino Crisafulli | Lista Civica - Per il Futuro di Itala - Crescere e Progredire | Mayor | |
| 2022 | incumbent | Daniele Laudini | Lista Civica - Io Amo Itala Sicilia Vera. | Mayor | |
