= Mandanici =

Mandanici Mannanici
- Comune
- Comune di Mandanici
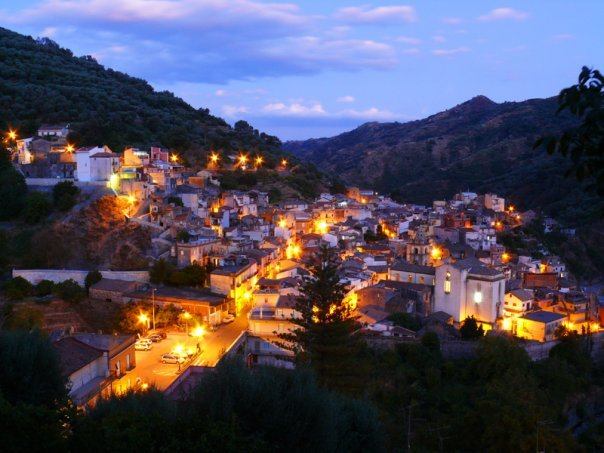
- Mandanici by night

- Map of the comune of Mandanici within the province of Messina

- Location within Italy Location within Sicily
- Coordinates: 38°0′N 15°19′E
- Country: Italy
- Region: Sicily
- Metropolitan city: Messina (ME)

Government
  - Mayor: Armando Carpo

Area
  - Total: 11.7 km^{2} (4.5 sq mi)
- Elevation: 417 m (1,368 ft)

Population (30 November 2011)
  - Total: 635
  - Density: 54.3/km^{2} (141/sq mi)
- Demonym: Mandanicesi
- Time zone: UTC+1 (CET)
  - Summer (DST): UTC+2 (CEST)
- Postal code: 98020
- Dialing code: 0942
- Patron saint: Santa Domenica
- Saint day: Second Sunday of August
- Website: Official website

Mandanici (Sicilian: Mannanici) is a comune (municipality) in the Metropolitan City of Messina in the Italian region Sicily, located about 170 kilometres (110 mi) east of Palermo and about 30 kilometres (19 mi) southwest of Messina.

Mandanici borders the municipalities of Fiumedinisi, Nizza di Sicilia, Pagliara, Roccalumera, and Santa Lucia del Mela.

== History ==
Mandanici, a small centre in the Province of Messina, was founded in a broad valley on the slopes of Pizzo Luci at the foot of the Peloritani. Its origin is uncertain, but it is claimed that it was founded by Greek colonists during the Chalkidean migration. More secure evidence exists from the period of Norman rule, as it was recorded in the royal historian Don Rocco Pirri's Sicilia Sacra. Even today, Mandanici's historical cultural importance is attested by the duomo, with its frescoes and amazing wooden roof and terracotta columns from local sources; by the remains of the abbey of San Basilio, which was erected at the impetus of Roger II (1100) to be a centre of international study, gatherings and religion; and by the works of art like the canvas and plaster crucifix from 1600 in the church of SS. Trinità la Madonna del Cesto, the paintings of Subba, and the Norman churches.

Another monument of historical value is the church of SS. Salvatore from the seventeenth century, which has been restored and designated a Museo Etnocintropologico. The local library is full of books on medicine, history, and theology from the sixteenth century.

== Economy ==
In addition to pastoralism and agriculture in general, the local economy is involved in the production of high quality olive oil. The oil of the Mandanici has achieved recognition as a product of excellence due to its high percentage of oleic acid and low overall acidity. It has been recognised by the University of Bari as among the best in Italy because in addition to its taste, it contains a great deal of monounsaturated fats, antioxidants, and large amounts of vitamins. Solvents are not used during the pressing process, so it is an entirely organic product.

The Mandanicese kitchen offers the typical dishes based on chicken cooked on the grill in a wood-fired oven. Mandanicese macaroni, made by hand and prepared with tomato, eggplant and local antipastos (salami, pecorino cheese, eggplant in oil, olives in brine, and dried tomatoes), is famous and is served to tourists in the local restaurants.

== Geography ==
Mandanici is located ten kilometres from the rail line for Roccalumera and from the SS 114, whence it is accessed by the Roccalumera-Mandanici local trains. It lies on the slopes of the Peloritani at the centre of an arc from Monte Scuderi that includes the summit of Mualio at an altitude of 417 metres.

== Demographic evolution ==
Historical population

| Year | Pop. | ±% |
|---|---|---|
| 1861 | 1,048 | — |
| 1871 | 1,083 | +3.3% |
| 1881 | 1,062 | −1.9% |
| 1901 | 1,258 | +18.5% |
| 1911 | 1,273 | +1.2% |

| Year | Pop. | ±% |
|---|---|---|
| 1921 | 1,439 | +13.0% |
| 1931 | 1,429 | −0.7% |
| 1936 | 1,417 | −0.8% |
| 1951 | 1,339 | −5.5% |
| 1961 | 1,188 | −11.3% |

| Year | Pop. | ±% |
|---|---|---|
| 1971 | 1,040 | −12.5% |
| 1981 | 932 | −10.4% |
| 1991 | 843 | −9.5% |
| 2001 | 761 | −9.7% |

Source: Data from ISTAT

== People ==
- Emilio Argiroffi (1922–1998), doctor, politician, poet, painter
