= Gualtieri Sicaminò =

- Comune
- Comune di Gualtieri Sicaminò
- Location within Italy Location within Sicily
- Coordinates: 38°10′N 15°19′E
- Country: Italy
- Region: Sicily
- Metropolitan city: Messina (ME)

Government
  - Mayor: Santina Bitto

Area
  - Total: 14.4 km^{2} (5.6 sq mi)
- Elevation: 80 m (260 ft)

Population (31 December 2011)
  - Total: 1,848
  - Density: 128/km^{2} (332/sq mi)
- Demonym: Gualtieresi
- Time zone: UTC+1 (CET)
  - Summer (DST): UTC+2 (CEST)
- Postal code: 98040
- Dialing code: 090
- Patron saint: St. Nicholas of Bari
- Website: Official website

Gualtieri Sicaminò is a comune (municipality) in the Metropolitan City of Messina in the Italian region Sicily, located about 170 kilometres (110 mi) east of Palermo and about 20 kilometres (12 mi) west of Messina.

Gualtieri Sicaminò borders the following municipalities: Condrò, Pace del Mela, San Pier Niceto, Santa Lucia del Mela.
