= Roccalumera =

- Comune
- Comune di Roccalumera
- Location within Italy Location within Sicily
- Coordinates: 37°59′N 15°24′E
- Country: Italy
- Region: Sicily
- Metropolitan city: Messina (ME)
- Frazioni: Allume, Sciglio

Government
  - Mayor: Gaetano Argiroffi

Area
  - Total: 8.8 km^{2} (3.4 sq mi)
- Elevation: 7 m (23 ft)

Population (30 November 2011)
  - Total: 4,252
  - Density: 480/km^{2} (1,300/sq mi)
- Demonym: Roccalumeresi
- Time zone: UTC+1 (CET)
  - Summer (DST): UTC+2 (CEST)
- Postal code: 98027
- Dialing code: 0942
- Website: Official website

Roccalumera is a comune (municipality) in the Metropolitan City of Messina in the Italian region Sicily, located about 180 kilometres (110 mi) east of Palermo and about 25 kilometres (16 mi) southwest of Messina.

Roccalumera borders the following municipalities: Fiumedinisi, Furci Siculo, Mandanici, Nizza di Sicilia, Pagliara.

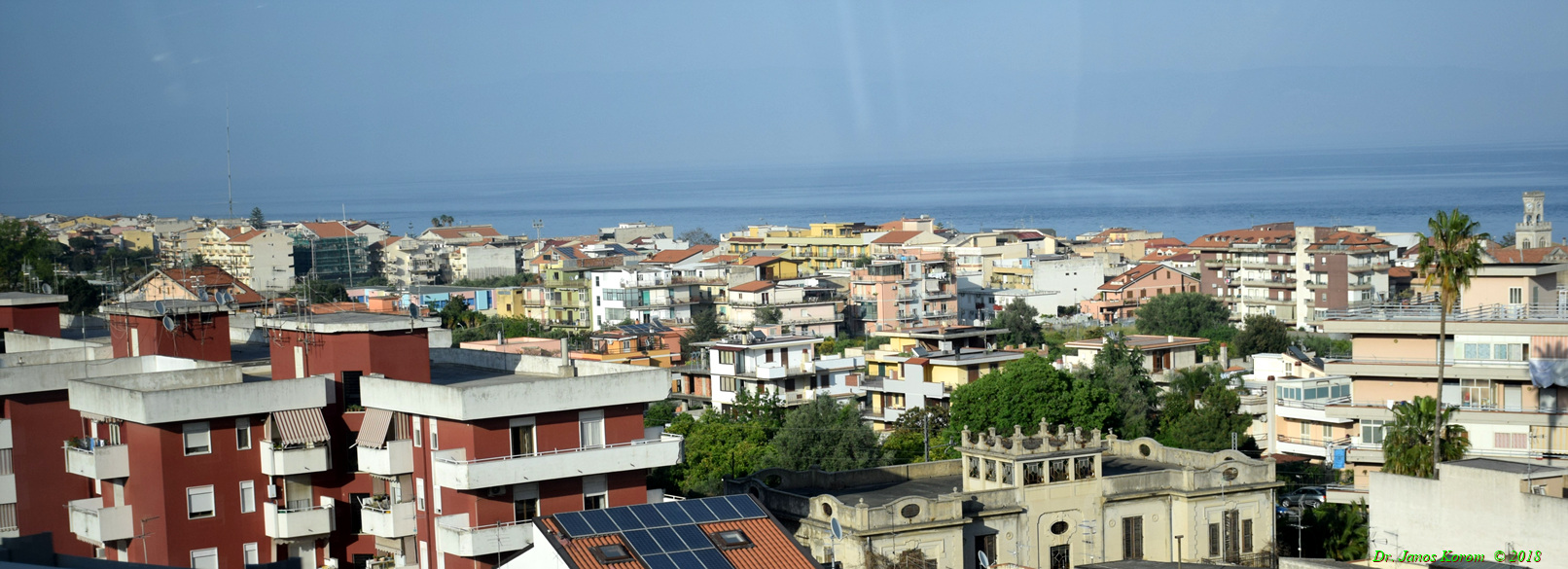
Roccalumera
