= Pace del Mela =

- Comune
- Comune di Pace del Mela
- Location within Italy Location within Sicily
- Coordinates: 38°11′N 15°18′E
- Country: Italy
- Region: Sicily
- Metropolitan city: Messina (ME)

Government
  - Mayor: Mario LaMalfa

Area
  - Total: 12.1 km^{2} (4.7 sq mi)
- Elevation: 114 m (374 ft)

Population (30 June 2012)
  - Total: 6,372
  - Density: 527/km^{2} (1,360/sq mi)
- Demonym: Pacesi
- Time zone: UTC+1 (CET)
  - Summer (DST): UTC+2 (CEST)
- Postal code: 98042
- Dialing code: 090
- Website: Official website

Pace del Mela (Sicilian: Paci) is a comune (municipality) in the Province of Messina in the Italian region Sicily, located about 170 kilometres (110 mi) east of Palermo and about 20 kilometres (12 mi) west of Messina.

Pace del Mela borders the following municipalities: Condrò, Gualtieri Sicaminò, San Filippo del Mela, San Pier Niceto, Santa Lucia del Mela.

== Twin towns ==
- Trikala, Greece
- Limoges, France
- Olbia, Italy

== People ==
- Massimo Mollica (1929–2013)
