= Ludovico Fulci =

Sicilian lawyer and professor

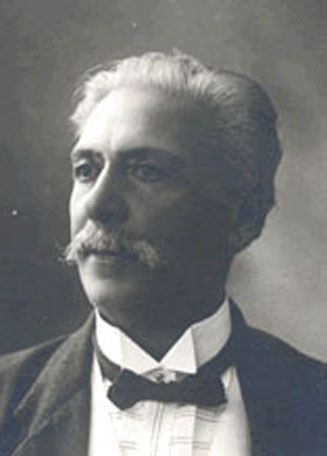
- Born: 1 January 1850; Santa Lucia del Mela, Messina, Sicily, Kingdom of the Two Sicilies
- Died: 28 June 1934 (aged 84); Messina, Sicily, Italy
- Education: Messina
- Occupations: Lawyer; Professor of jurisprudence Politician * deputy (lower house) * senator (upper house)
- Political party: Radical Party ("Partito Radicale storico")
- Spouse: Rosa Guerrera
- Children: Nicola; Alfredo; Francesco
- Parent(s): Antonio Fulci (1810-1882); Nicolina Taccone

Ludovico Fulci (1 January 1850 – 28 June 1934) (Note: Some sources give Ludovico Fulci's date of birth as 31 December 1849. Presumably he was born overnight. 1 January 1850 is preferred here. It is the date of birth given in the biographical essay in the "Dizionario Biografico degli Italiani". It is also the date of birth entered on the 1919 document recording his admission as a senator.) was a lawyer and professor of jurisprudence from Sicily who became a national Italian politician. He can, for most purposes, be considered to have been a member of the Radical Party ("Partito Radicale storico"). During an unusually lengthy parliamentary career, he served as a member of the Chamber of Deputies ("Camera dei deputati"), between 1882 and 1913, and then - some thought in defiance of his own his anti-Monarchist principals - accepted nomination by the king as a senator in 1919, serving in the senate until his death in 1934.

== Biography ==
=== Provenance and early years ===
Ludovico Fulci was born in Santa Lucia del Mela, a small municipality located in the hills to the west of the provincial capital, Messina. He was the son of Antonio Fulci by his marriage to Nicolina Taccone, who was also of aristocratic provenance. The Fulci of Santa Lucia del Mela were a family from the minor nobility, originally from Tropea. They had moved from Calabria to Sicily during the sixteenth century. Ludovico's father, Antonio Fulci, was a lawyer who also held a teaching chair in Civil law at the University of Messina. Ludovico was a family name which he shared both with his uncle and with his grandfather.

=== Young lawyer ===
Ludovico graduated with a degree in law from the University of Messina and in 1873 launched himself as a criminal lawyer. He also sustained an academic interest in the law, evidenced by the publication in 1879 of his brief but challenging volume "Di alcuni problemi giuridici fondamentali" (loosely, "On some fundamental legal problems"). The book is concerned less with his professional speciality - criminal law - and more with the underlying philosophy of civil law. Themes tackled include the nature of the state, the very concept of law and the complex interaction between law and morality. He obtained a professorship in criminal law at the university in 1891.

=== Deputy ===
Meanwhile, on 29 October 1882 the electoral college for Messina elected him to membership of the Chamber of Deputies ("Camera dei deputati"), the elected lower house of the Italian parliament. He was re-elected at no fewer than nine subsequent general elections, the last of them being that of 18 July 1909. Political parties within the parliament during this period were still relatively loose groupings, but Ludovico Fulci is normally classified in sources as a Radical Party member. In 1908 he voted for the contentious Bissolati motion which sought to outlaw religious education in primary schools. Fulci combined his university teaching and his national political duties with membership of the Provincial Council for Messina, of which he became vice-president. and, eventually, president.

One project in which he was closely involved during this period involved a new aqueduct constructed for Messina. A college of arbitration was created to settle some of the disputes arising from the project, in which Fulci appeared as the lawyer representing the municipality. His success in winning a major dispute on behalf of the municipal authorities significantly accelerated the aqueduct's completion.

Fulci's advocacy skills were also on display when he teamed up with fellow-lawyer Francesco Crispi to head up the defence team for the posthumous retrial as to facts held at the assize court in Rome, following the execution in Trieste of Guglielmo Oberdan. Trieste at this time was still an Austrian city subjugated, according to Italian nationalists, to a form of illegitimate military occupation. Oberdan's alleged crime was that he had plotted to assassinate the Austrian emperor. His last words were "viva Italia!" and he accordingly rapidly acquired martyr status among patriotic Italians. Fulci may not have shared Crispi's (late-flowering) monarchist sentiments, but he was just as much of an Italian patriot.

Following the 1887 cholera epidemic, Fulci founded "The Golden Cross" ("La croce d'oro"), a large-scale public assistance organisation. Recognition followed in the form of a Silver Medal of Public Health and Welfare.

He was part of the parliamentary sub-committee that produced the final draft of the new 1887 Criminal Procedure Code. This involved him in heated disagreements of principal over whether the opportunity should be taken to insert in the new code a right for judges to order the hospitalisation of accused parties following a "not guilty" verdict based on mental incapacity. The provision was retained in article 46 of the code, but triggered on-going disputes between those adhering rigidly to a belief that a judge's role in a criminal trial should cease at the point of determinable of guilt or innocence, and others who considered the new provision indispensable, basing their arguments on new positivist theories of a "social defence". Fulci's arguments reveal a delight in the legal and moral complexities involved, but he was not in favour of extending the role of the judge in a criminal trial beyond point at which guilt or innocence are to be determined.

=== Legal scholarship ===
Fulci's monograph "L'evoluzione del diritto penale. La forza irresistibile" (loosely, "The evolution of criminal law. The irresistible force") appeared in 1891 and was still in print 90 years later. It was considered an important contribution to legal doctrine, notably by Cesare Lombroso and by Francesco Carrara who wrote a warmly appreciative critique of it shortly before his death.

=== Rosa Guerrera ===
By the time of the 1913 general election Fulci was 63, which may be one reason why he withdrew from politics, not standing for election. 1913 was also the year in which he married Rosa Guerrera.

=== Senator ===
He nevertheless accepted nomination as a senator on 6 October 1919. The nomination came automatically according to various sets of criteria. In Fulci's case it was because he had retired after serving as an elected member of the Chamber of Deputies during three parliaments, and been a deputy for more than six years. Either criterion would have secured an invitation to join the senate, but it would still have been open to Fulci to reject the offer which, formally, came from the king. His admission to the senate followed on 9 December 1919. He was formally sworn in on 27 December 1919.

=== Death and celebration ===
Ludovico Fulci died at Messina on 28 June 1934. When parliament reconvened towards the end of the year he was one of three recently deceased long-serving former deputies who had subsequently become senators (Note: The other two were Giuseppe D'Andrea from Benevento and Marco Pozzo of Novara.) to be honoured with a (Note: The official transcript of it concludes with a brief intervention from the Head of Government and Prime Minister himself, endorsing the tribute.) tribute delivered by Luigi Federzoni, the President of the Senate, in an address to the chamber following the opening of the session at 16.00 on 3 December 1934. Federzoni recalled in particular the energy and prescience (..."il fervore e chiaroveggenza") which Fulci had displayed in the aftermath of the earthquake which devastated Messina in 1908, along with his unstinting contributions to the arguments and disputes on the legal and financial aspects of the massive reconstruction necessary. There were nevertheless persistent rumours that Senator Fulci died because he was poisoned on account of his known hostility to Fascism. His advocacy of secularism did not sit well with the statism advocated by the Fascists. Ever since the murder in 1924 of Matteotti, it had been clear to everyone that for a politician to voice criticism of the Fascists was, in terms of personal safety, unwise.

== Personal ==
Ludovico Fulci's marriage to Rosa Guerrera, which took place in 1913, was followed by the births of the couple's three sons, Nicola, Alfredo and Francesco.

Ludovico Fulci's younger brother, Nicolò Fulci (1857 - 1908), also achieved distinction as a lawyer and politician. He served as a deputy (elected member of parliament) between 1892 and 1908, and as a junior government minister between 1901 and 1903. Nicolò Fulci died in the earthquake.

Freemasonry provides important context for Ludovico Fulci's life, and for the anti-clerical secularism underpinning his Radical Party politics. In 1880 he joined the Adonhiram Lodge in Messina. He was also a member of Messina's "Mazzini & Garibaldi" Lodge, installed as Grand Master of it between 1884 and 1888. On 9 April 1919 the Messina "Liberty Lodge" accepted him for membership of the Grand Orient of Italy, appointing him an Honorary Grand Master, at a ceremony attended by more than 200.

== Awards and honours ==
- 3 June 1878 Knight of the Crown of Italy (Cavaliere dell'Ordine della Corona d'Italia )
- 10 June 1880 Knight of Saints Maurice and Lazarus (Cavaliere dell'Ordine dei Santi Maurizio e Lazzaro)
- 8 January 1885 Officer of the Crown of Italy (Ufficiale dell'Ordine della Corona d'Italia)
- 22 September 1890 Commander of the Crown of Italy (Commendatore dell'Ordine della Corona d'Italia)
- 24 March 1912 Commander of Saints Maurice and Lazarus (Commendatore dell'Ordine dei Santi Maurizio e Lazzaro)
- 27 April 1913 Grand officer of the Crown of Italy (Grande Ufficiale dell'Ordine della Corona d'Italia)
