= Fiumedinisi =

- Comune
- Comune di Fiumedinisi
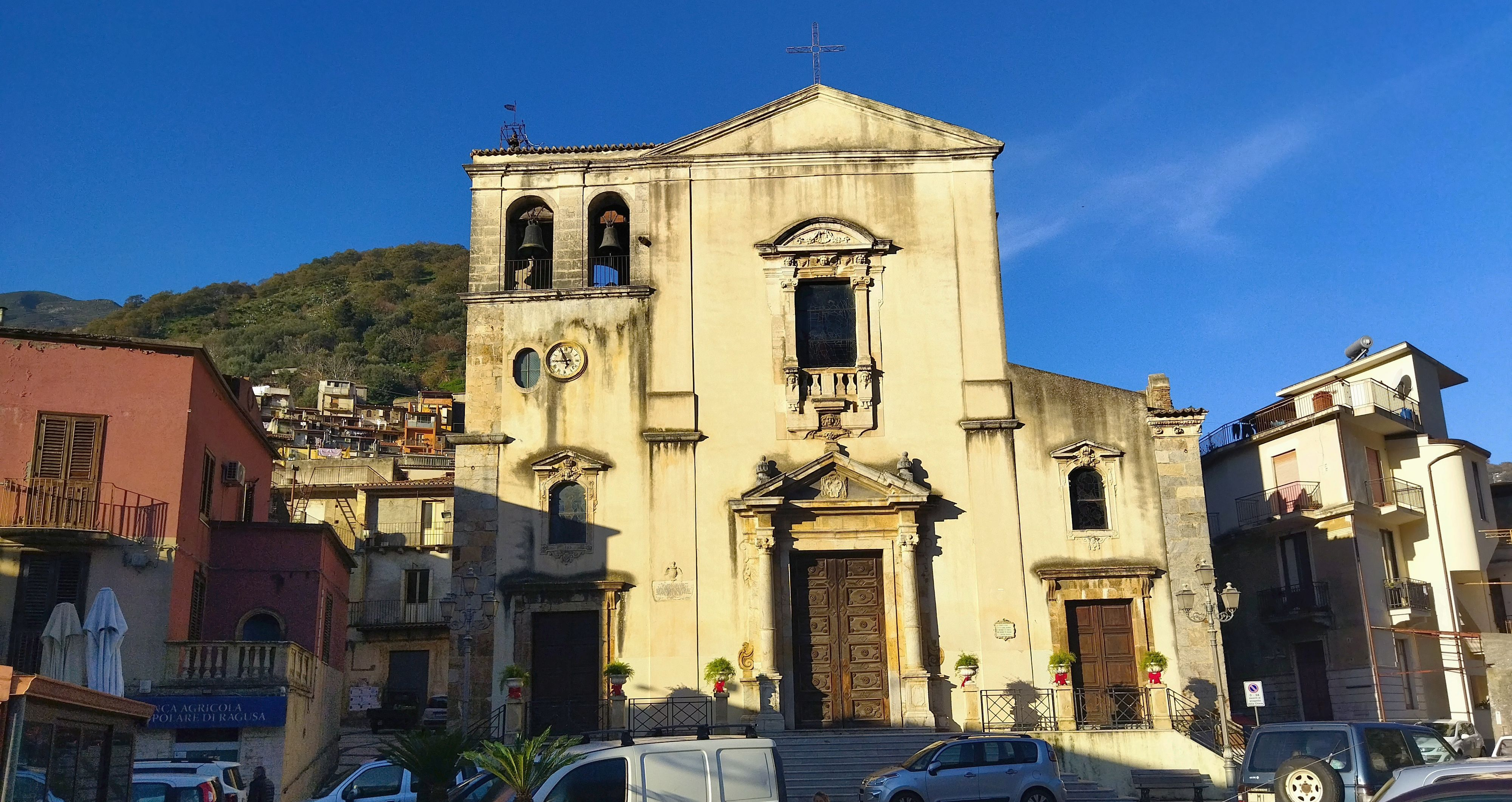

- Coat of arms

- Location within Italy Location within Sicily
- Coordinates: 38°1′N 15°23′E
- Country: Italy
- Region: Sicily
- Metropolitan city: Messina (ME)

Government
  - Mayor: Giovanni Sebastiano De Luca

Area
  - Total: 36.0 km^{2} (13.9 sq mi)
- Elevation: 200 m (660 ft)

Population (31 December 2011)
  - Total: 1,533
  - Density: 42.6/km^{2} (110/sq mi)
- Demonym: Fiumedinisani
- Time zone: UTC+1 (CET)
  - Summer (DST): UTC+2 (CEST)
- Postal code: 98022
- Dialing code: 0942
- Patron saint: Annunciation of Mary
- Saint day: March 25
- Website: www.comune.fiumedinisi.me.it

Fiumedinisi (Sicilian: Ciumidinisi) is a comune (municipality) in the Metropolitan City of Messina in the Italian region Sicily, located about 180 kilometres (110 mi) east of Palermo and about 25 kilometres (16 mi) southwest of Messina.

Fiumedinisi borders the following municipalities: Alì, Alì Terme, Itala, Mandanici, Messina, Monforte San Giorgio, Nizza di Sicilia, Roccalumera, San Pier Niceto, Santa Lucia del Mela.

Fiumedinisi is known for the celebration of The Annunciation of Mary, called the Festa Della Vara(Feast of the Float).

== People ==
- Cateno De Luca (born 1972)
- Clementina Cicala (born 1946)
