= Alì =

Alì Alìs/Elìs (Greek)
- Comune
- Comune di Alì
- Location of Alì in Italy Alì (Sicily)
- Coordinates: 38°2′N 15°25′E
- Country: Italy
- Region: Sicily
- Metropolitan city: Messina (ME)

Government
  - Mayor: Pietro Fiumara

Area
  - Total: 16.7 km^{2} (6.4 sq mi)
- Elevation: 450 m (1,480 ft)

Population (30 November 2013)
  - Total: 795
  - Density: 47.6/km^{2} (123/sq mi)
- Demonym: Aliesi or Alioti
- Time zone: UTC+1 (CET)
  - Summer (DST): UTC+2 (CEST)
- Postal code: 98020
- Dialing code: 0942
- Website: www.comune.ali.me.it

Alì is a comune (municipality) in the Metropolitan City of Messina in the Italian region Sicily, located about 180 kilometres (110 mi) east of Palermo and about 20 kilometres (12 mi) southwest of Messina.

Alì borders the following municipalities: Alì Terme, Fiumedinisi, Itala.
