= Santa Lucia del Mela =

- Comune
- Comune di Santa Lucia del Mela
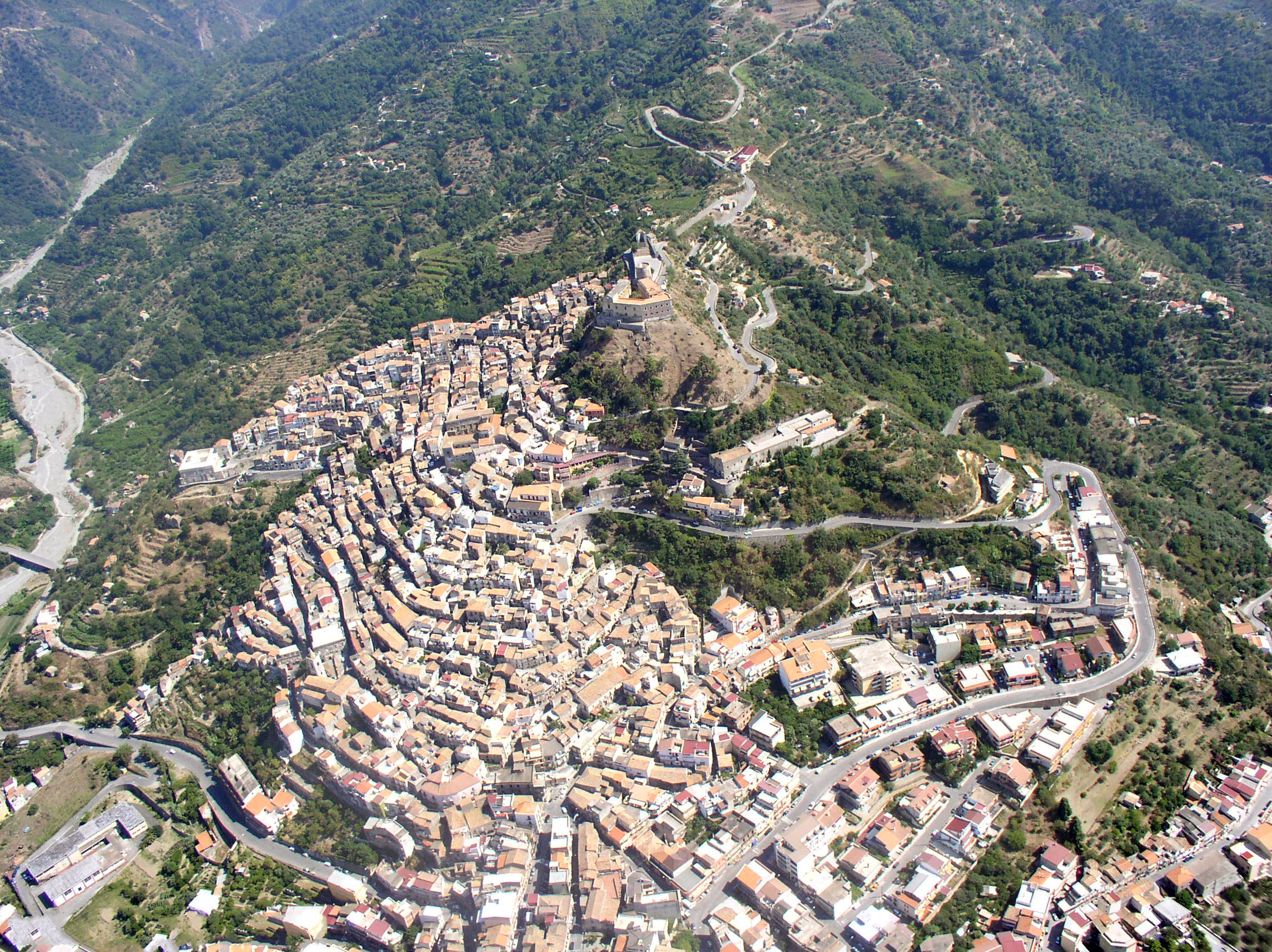

- Coat of arms

- Location within Italy Location within Sicily
- Coordinates: 38°9′N 15°17′E
- Country: Italy
- Region: Sicily
- Metropolitan city: Messina (ME)
- Frazioni: Femminamorta, San Giovanni (Pancaldo)

Government
  - Mayor: Matteo Sciotto

Area
  - Total: 82.9 km^{2} (32.0 sq mi)
- Elevation: 215 m (705 ft)

Population (31 December 2011)
  - Total: 4,755
  - Density: 57.4/km^{2} (149/sq mi)
- Demonym: Luciesi
- Time zone: UTC+1 (CET)
  - Summer (DST): UTC+2 (CEST)
- Postal code: 98046
- Dialing code: 090
- Website: Official website

Santa Lucia del Mela (Sicilian: Santa Lucìa dû Mela) is a comune (municipality) in the Metropolitan City of Messina in the Italian region Sicily, located about 170 kilometres (110 mi) east of Palermo and about 25 kilometres (16 mi) west of Messina. It is one of the largest communes in the province of Messina.

Santa Lucia del Mela borders the following municipalities: Barcellona Pozzo di Gotto, Casalvecchio Siculo, Castroreale, Fiumedinisi, Furci Siculo, Gualtieri Sicaminò, Mandanici, Merì, Pace del Mela, Pagliara, San Filippo del Mela, San Pier Niceto.

== Geography ==
The territory of the municipality of Santa Lucia del Mela, one of the largest in the province (less than 83 km ²), has a variety of landscapes. From the peaks of Peloritani, it offers the vision of the Tyrrhenian and Ionian seas. The variety of flora, ancient oaks, native forests. Climbing up the Mela river and its water perennial, you get to the prehistoric fern, that grows by at least 60 million years. The fauna is diverse: there are dormice, blackbirds, crows, hawks, porcupines, wild cats, hedgehogs, martens, hares. In places: Postoleone (1020 m) where work is underway for years in forests, is found a refuge for forest and a lake, a destination for hikers and campers, with permission, many also from the ion rush. Mountain trails on foot or horseback to the source of Mela river or Timogna Rocca (1180 m) can be organized using the guide prepared by Nicola Friend knowledge of the mountain territory. The town is just 7 kilometres (4 mi) from the motorway Milazzo. It is only 35 kilometres (22 mi) from Messina, and just 12 kilometres (7 mi) from Milazzo and Barcelona P.G.

== History ==
The origins of this town, the ancient Mankarru, are unknown. Greek ruins (on the left bank of the river Floripotamo remains of the temple of Diana Facellina were found) and 2nd century BC Roman tombs attest the presence of Greek-Roman settlements. At its peak, Mankarru or Mankarruna, thanks to its strategic position, was an important military outpost. On the remains of the former city walls the Byzantines built a fort, subsequently rebuilt by the Arabs between 837 and 851. On the slope of the hill, the latter also built a mosque. This was converted subsequently to the church of Saint Nicholas.

After his conquest of Sicily, the Norman Count Roger I, to fulfill a vow, built a church (1094) adjacent to the castle and dedicated to Saint Lucy, to whom he was devoted. Since that date the archaic name of Mankarru was changed under Christian rule to Santa Lucia. In The Gallery of Maps in the Vatican, Father Ignatius Daddi in 1529 called this city Santa Locia. With the establishment of a Prelature Nullius in Santa Lucia del Mela by Frederick II of Hohenstaufen, who chose the site as a place of recreation and rest, the temple was designated (1206) as the Santa Lucia del Mela cathedral. Since then, 67 prelates have overseen the diocese, adding further churches and decoration. In addition, the Prelate of Santa Lucia was awarded the honor of serving as Major chaplain of the kingdom and the town was entitled to 11 seats in Parliament.

Frederick II of Aragon fortified the town with walls and renovated its castle. He emitted a proclamation calling on the population of the plain, which was subject to recurrent raids by pirates, to resettle inside the town walls. In addition, a colony from Lombardy settled in the town. The town once sheltered a major Giudecca, a large Jewish community, in the current area of Candlemas; however, in 1492, Jews in Sicily, then under Aragonese rule were subject to Expulsion. The town had an active silk industry and silver mines. The city, as the state, boasted many noble families.

== Notable residents ==
- Ludovico Fulci (1 Jan 1850 – 28 Jun 1934), lawyer and politician
