= Strait of Messina metropolitan area =

Strait of Messina Metropolitan Area Area Metropolitana dello Stretto di Messina
- Metropolitan Area
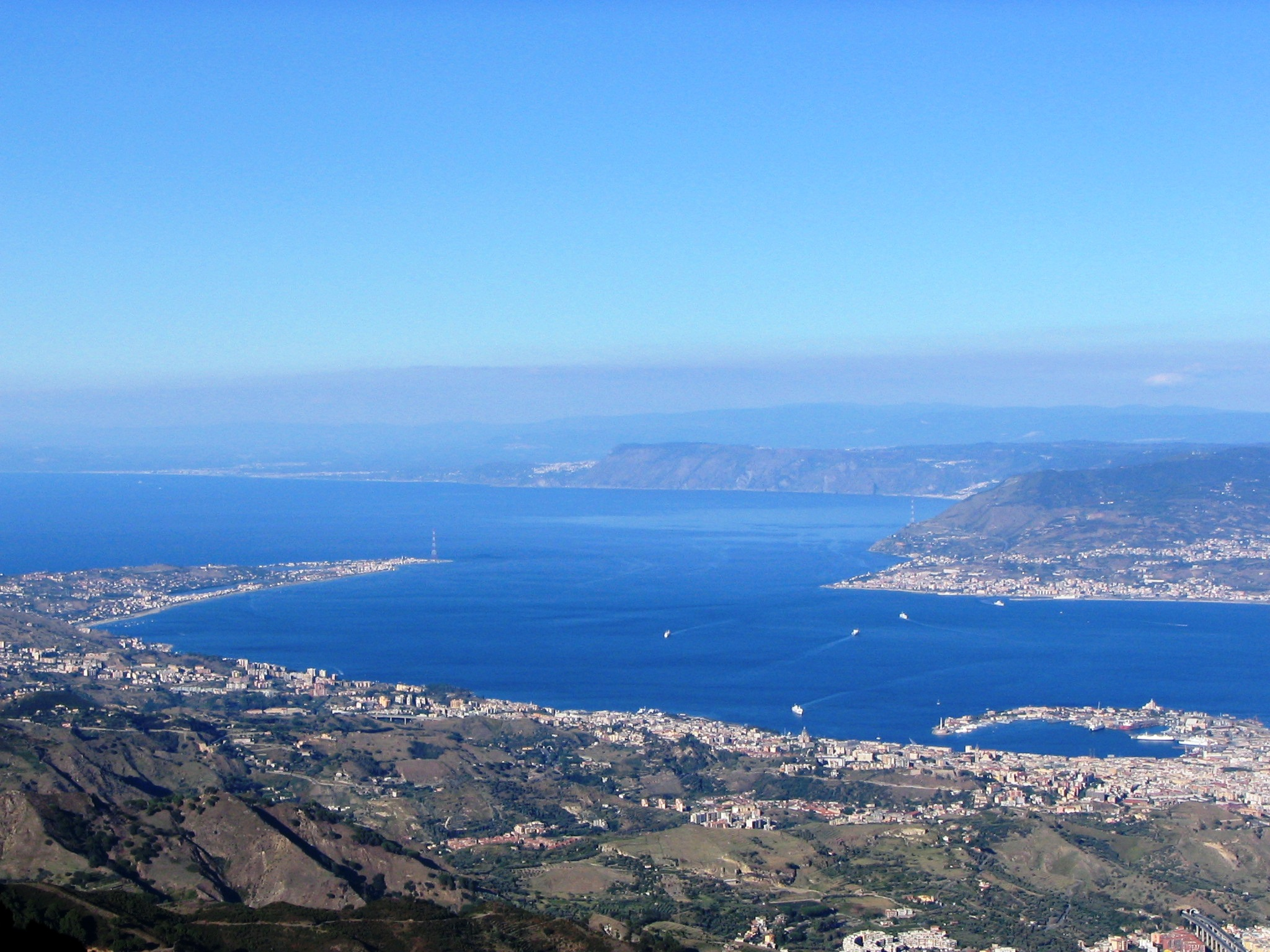
- View of Strait of Messina, from the Sicilian coast

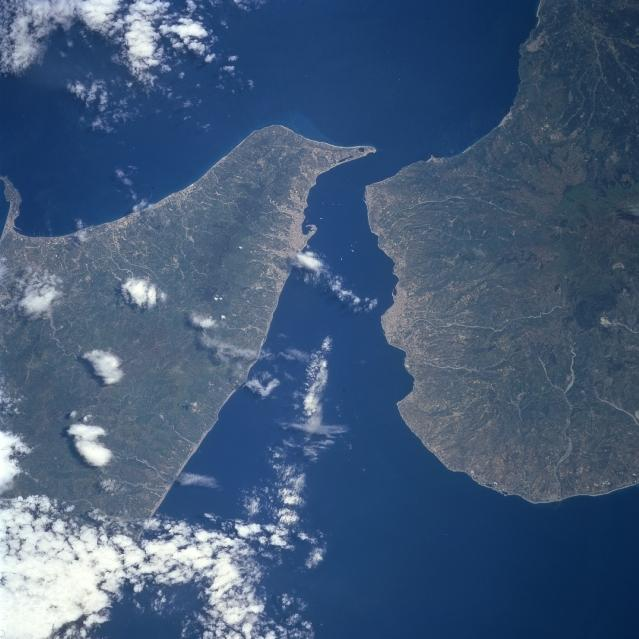
- Strait of Messina from satellite
- Country: Italy
- Regions: Sicily, Calabria
- Largest city: Messina
- Other Major Cities: Reggio Calabria; Barcellona Pozzo di Gotto; Milazzo

Area
  - Total: 1,907.50 km^{2} (736.49 sq mi)

Population (November 2011)
  - Total: 744,646
  - Density: 390.378/km^{2} (1,011.07/sq mi)
- Website: www.provincia.messina.it www.provincia.rc.it

The Metropolitan Area of Strait of Messina (Area Metropolitana dello Stretto di Messina, in Italian), is the urban agglomeration around the Strait of Messina, and is one of the most populated and important areas of Southern Italy. It includes part of the Province of Messina, in Sicily, and part of the Province of Reggio Calabria, in Calabria.

== Geography ==
=== Population ===
Population (Nov 2011)
Region	City	Area (km^{2})	Population
Strait of Messina Metropolitan Area
Calabria	Bagnara Calabra	24.68	10,660
Calabria	Bagaladi	30	1,113
Calabria	Bova Marina	29	3,883
Calabria	Calanna	10	1,004
Calabria	Campo Calabro	7.46	4,445
Calabria	Cardeto	36	1,832
Calabria	Condofuri	58	4,941
Calabria	Fiumara	6	1,053
Calabria	Laganadi	8	425
Calabria	Melito di Porto Salvo	35	11,696
Calabria	Montebello Ionico	55	6,380
Calabria	Motta San Giovanni	45	6,329
Calabria	Reggio Calabria	236.02	186,417
Calabria	Roccaforte del Greco	54	568
Calabria	Roghudi	36	1,202
Calabria	San Lorenzo	64	2,825
Calabria	San Roberto	34	1,181
Calabria	Sant'Alessio in Aspromonte	4	347
Calabria	Santo Stefano in Aspromonte	17	1,310
Calabria	Scilla	43	5,125
Calabria	Villa San Giovanni	12.22	13,847
Total Calabria		845.06	266,203
Sicily	Alì	16	838
Sicily	Alì Terme	6	2,600
Sicily	Antillo	43	984
Sicily	Barcellona Pozzo di Gotto	59.89	41,891
Sicily	Casalvecchio Siculo	33	907
Sicily	Castelmola	16	1,087
Sicily	Castroreale	54	2,645
Sicily	Condrò	5	492
Sicily	Fiumedinisi	35	1,537
Sicily	Forza d'Agrò	11	914
Sicily	Furci Siculo	17.85	3,382
Sicily	Furnari	13.48	3,663
Sicily	Gaggi	7	3,153
Sicily	Gallodoro	6	387
Sicily	Giardini Naxos	5	9,687
Sicily	Gualtieri Sicaminò	14	1,847
Sicily	Itala	10	1,672
Sicily	Leni	8.56	708
Sicily	Letojanni	6	2,795
Sicily	Limina	9	916
Sicily	Lipari	88.61	11,531
Sicily	Malfa	8	1,001
Sicily	Mandanici	11	635
Sicily	Merì	1.87	2,407
Sicily	Messina	211.23	241,505
Sicily	Milazzo	24.23	32,501
Sicily	Monforte San Giorgio	32.33	2,889
Sicily	Nizza di Sicilia	13	3,764
Sicily	Pace del Mela	12	6,409
Sicily	Pagliara	14	1,253
Sicily	Roccafiorita	1.14	229
Sicily	Roccalumera	8.77	4,252
Sicily	Roccavaldina	6	1,153
Sicily	Rometta	32.50	6,680
Sicily	San Filippo del Mela	9.81	7,300
Sicily	San Pier Niceto	36	2,981
Sicily	Sant'Alessio Siculo	6	1,536
Sicily	Santa Lucia del Mela	82.89	4,758
Sicily	Santa Marina Salina	8	894
Sicily	Santa Teresa di Riva	8.13	9,354
Sicily	Saponara	26	4,115
Sicily	Savoca	8	1,821
Sicily	Scaletta Zanclea	5	2,272
Sicily	Spadafora	10.30	5,181
Sicily	Taormina	13.16	11,108
Sicily	Terme Vigliatore	13	7,295
Sicily	Torregrotta	4.22	7,491
Sicily	Valdina	2.75	1,283
Sicily	Venetico	4.38	3,886
Sicily	Villafranca Tirrena	14.34	8,854
Total Sicily		1062.44	478,443
Total Metropolitan Area		1907.50	744,646

=== Major cities ===
Messina, is a city situated in the extreme north-eastern tip of Sicily, also called "gate of Sicily", in ancient times was called "Zancle" and "Messana". Ancient city, has reached the pinnacle of his greatness, in the Late Middle Ages and in the mid-seventeenth century, when contending with Palermo, the Sicilian capital role. In 1678, after a historic anti-Spanish revolt, which resulted in the annihilation of its ruling class, a first devastating earthquake has partially destroyed the city in 1783, while in 1908 a devastating earthquake, followed by a tsunami, has razed to the ground the city, and have been generated about 80,000 victims. Rebuilt since 1912, the modern city presents a neat and regular mesh with wide straight streets. In recent years, there are ongoing projects aimed at regeneration of the city through works such as the waterfront, a new headquarters for the railway station, the bridge over the Strait. Messina is a city with an economy based on services, trade, tourism and a significant industrial activity in the shipbuilding craft. Its port is the first in Italy for the number of transit passengers and sixth for cruise traffic.

Reggio Calabria is the first municipality in the Calabria region for residents. Major functional pole in its region, has strong historical, cultural and economic ties with the city of Messina. First city in the region for its age, despite its ancient foundation - Ρηγιον was an important and flourishing colony of Magna Graecia - shows a modern urban system, because of the catastrophic earthquake that December 28, 1908, who destroyed most of the settlement. Its urban system, represents a major economic centers and regional service and transport, in the southern shores of the Mediterranean. Reggio Calabria, with Naples and Taranto, is home to one of the most important archaeological museums dedicated to Ancient Greece (which houses the famous Bronzes of Riace, rare example of Greek bronze sculpture, which became one of the symbols of the city), of two young universities and the Regional Council of Calabria. The center, consisting primarily of Liberty buildings, has a linear development along the coast, and with parallel streets with the promenade dotted with rares magnolias and exotic palms.

Barcellona Pozzo di Gotto, populous city close to Milazzo, it is characterized by an intense activity in: agriculture, trade and industry.

Milazzo is a peninsula, situated the Tyrrhenian Sea, in a strategic place. Located 43 km from Messina, is the benchmark for other little cities: job, trade, services. Originally a Greek city, and from 36 BC recognized as a Roman civitas, Milazzo is now a tourist destination and a great starting point for the Aeolian Islands, the Nebrodi Park, Tindari. There are numerous examples, symbols of the ancient history of the city. Plans are in progress aimed to enter the Castle, the fortified town and the ancient village in the UNESCO sites and to form the Marine Reserve of Capo Milazzo.

== Economy ==
The economy of the area is one of the largest economies of the metropolitan areas of Southern Italy. The container port of Gioia Tauro in Calabria is the largest port in Italy for container throughput, the 9th in Europe and 6th in the Mediterranean. The facilities in Milazzo, the Eolian islands and the port of Messina make for important transport hubs. The latter is constantly ranked in the top 3 busiest passenger ports in all of Europe and thanks to its depth, it is able to host cruise ships bringing tourism to Messina and the nearby areas.

== Agriculture ==
Agriculture in the area has always prospered with the flatlands near Barcellona Pozzo di Gotto acting as a breadbasket for the area. The Val di Niceto also provides space for vineyards while the Peloritani Mountains and the Aspromonte act as important physical features which help to shape the landscape and provide unique foods.

== Industry ==
Industry has developed in the area especially after the Italian economic miracle following the end of the Second World War. Important to note, is the Raffineria di Milazzo which is one of the biggest refineries in Italy.

== Tourism ==
Tourism forms an important part of the economy with the province of Messina alone being the second most visited province in all of southern Italy. This is mostly because of the cruise ships that dock on its port but also because of Tourist attractions in Taormina on the Ionian coast and the Aeolian islands on the Tyrrhenian coast. The Aeolian are a UNESCO World Heritage Site while Taormina has been proposed to be one. Other important Tourist attractions include: Capo Peloro, the Peloritani, Milazzo, Barcellona, Tindari and villages in the mountains such as Novara di Sicilia, Castroreale and Montalbano Elicona on the Sicilian side and Reggio Calabria, Villa San Giovanni, Scilla and the Aspromonte on the Calabrian side.

=== Infrastructure and transport ===
==== Highways ====
The Metropolitan Area of Strait of Messina is connected to the Autostrada A2 (Salerno-Reggio Calabria), A18 (Messina-Catania) and A20 (Messina-Palermo).

==== Airport ====
The Strait of Messina Metropolitan Area is served by air links with the Reggio Calabria Airport (IATA: REG, ICAO: LICR). Also known as Aeroporto dello Stretto or Tito Minniti Airport, is located at south of Reggio Calabria. The first track of the airport was built in 1939 with military purposes. On 11 July 1943 a USA air raid razed the structure, and later was rebuilt for civil aviation. The first flight took place on April 10, 1947, with a twin-engine propeller-driven "Douglas DC-3" on the Turin - Bologna - Florence - Naples - Reggio Calabria - Palermo. The design of the first paved runway began in October 1960. By decision of the Ministry of Defense-Air Force, on 10 December 1975 the airport was named Tito Minniti, first pilot crashed in East Africa December 26, 1935 during the Ethiopian war. It is a structure in increasing improvement; the recent phase of modernization has allowed the increase in the number of available flights to Rome, Milan, Venice, Turin, Pisa, Bologna and other cities in Europe.

Plans for an airport in the province of Messina in the flatlands near Barcellona Pozzo di Gotto or in the Peloritani have been suggested before but no airport of such a kind existed at the moment.

=== Strait of Messina Bridge ===
Since Roman times, a bridge has been proposed to link the Calabrian and Sicilian regions. These projects have been close to being approved many times, and Italy's Giorgia Meloni government, seems to carry the projects forward.

The Highway system would be linked to the A2 in Calabria at Villa San Giovanni and at the A20 on the Sicilian side near Giostra.

There is also planned rail connection which would involve tunnels in the Peloritani mountains of Messina.

Year	Traffic Data
2000	538,048
2001	481,857
2002	463,662
2003	441,795
2004	272,859
2005	398,089
2006	607,727
2007	583,596
2008	536,032
2009	509,058
2010	548,648
2011	561,107

== Culture ==
=== Education ===
The University of Messina (Università degli Studi di Messina, in Italian, or UNIME), is an ancient university, and was founded in 1548 by Ignatio of Loyola such as the first ever College of Jesus's Company. Is formed by ten faculties (Arts and Humanities; Economics; Education; Engineering; Law; Mathematics, Physics and Natural Sciences; Medicine; Pharmacy; Political Science; Veterinary Medicine), distributed in various part of the city of Messina.

The University of Reggio Calabria, or Mediterranean University of Reggio Calabria (Università Mediterranea di Reggio Calabria, in Italian, or UNIRC), was founded in 1968, and is one of the youngest universities in Italy. UNIRC combines its commitment in research and teaching: three faculties (Architecture, Engineering, Agricultural Science), are dedicated to the territory, creating an "Environment Polytechnic" with a strong propensity to the themes of architecture, landscape, urbanism, infrastructure associated at the green economy. The faculty of Law, study from the economic issues to those related to archeology and artistic heritage.

In addition, there are: "Dante Alighieri University" (for foreign student) situated in Reggio Calabria; and two "Academies of Fine Arts" (Decoration, Graphics, Painting, Sculpture and Scenography), situated in Messina and Reggio Calabria.
