= Santo Sfameni =

Member of the Sicilian Mafia (1928–2012)

- Born: 1 August 1928; Saponara, Sicily, Kingdom of Italy
- Died: 22 January 2012 (aged 83); Villafranca, Sicily, Italy
- Other name: Il patriarca (The Patriarch)
- Occupation: Crime boss
- Allegiance: Cosa Nostra

Santo Sfameni (Saponara, 1 August 1928 – Villafranca, 22 January 2012) was an Italian businessman and mafioso, considered one of the principal representatives of Cosa Nostra in the areas of Messina, Villafranca Tirrena, and the surrounding regions.

== History ==
Santo Sfameni worked as a nurse until the late 1970s at the Regina Margherita Hospital in Messina. The Antimafia Commission later revealed in a report that during the period in which he was employed there, numerous prominent members of the Sicilian Mafia and of the 'Ndrangheta were treated at the hospital. Among them were Francesco Paolo Bontade, historial capo of the Santa Maria di Gesù Mafia family in Palermo, who died at that hospital, and Girolamo Piromalli, one of the founders of the Piromalli 'ndrina of Gioia Tauro. However, no direct link was established between his role as a nurse and the privileged treatment received by these individuals.

Around the 1980s, Sfameni turned to entrepreneurship, particularly in the construction sector, through the establishment of the company “Le.Ni”, which would carry out much of the urban expansion in the areas between Villafranca and Torregrotta. Several cooperating witnesses commented on him, describing him as an “intermediary or link between Cosa Nostra and certain members of the judiciary”.

It is alleged that he mafia meetings at his rural estate, bringing together members of Cosa Nostra, particularly from Palermo and Catania, as well as figures linked to politics and the judiciary. The informant Angelo Siino reported having met Sfameni to discuss public procurement contracts in the Villafranca Tirrena area, while another cooperating witness, Antonio Cariolo, testified that Sfameni provided shelter to the fugitive boss Carlo Greco, a close associate of Pietro Aglieri. According to Salvatore Giorgianni, Nitto Santapaola had also visited the estate. Several pentiti described Sfameni's residence as a meeting point for prominent figures of the Messina criminal underworld, who reportedly visited either for strategic discussions or to pay their respects.

In 1985, Santo Sfameni was implicated as an accomplice in the murder of Graziella Campagna, having provided protection to the Palermo-based mafiosi Gerlando Alberti Jr., nephew of the Gerlando Alberti, and Giovanni Sutera, who carried out the killing in the San Rizzo hills after the young woman had discovered compromising documents. Among the cooperating witnesses who spoke about him was Luigi Ilardo, who provided law enforcement with information on where to locate Sfameni during his period in hiding in the Messina district of San Saba. Sfameni was subsequently arrested in 1994 after eight months as a fugitive.

In the mid-1990s, Sfameni became involved in the “Witness” investigation, together with Michelangelo Alfano from Bagheria and the Messina criminal Luigi Sparacio. In 1999, he was arrested in connection with this investigation, and assets worth a total of €15 million were seized from him.

Santo Sfameni died on 22 January 2012, at the age of 83. He remained an influential and respected figure even in his later years, despite having delegated the management of criminal activities to younger associates. His death was marked by funeral notices posted throughout the town of Villafranca Tirrena, with services held at the Church of Our Lady of Lourdes.
