= Rumia (disambiguation) =

Rumia is a town in the Pomeranian Voivodeship of Poland. Other meanings include:

== Places ==
- Rumia (SKM stop)
- Rumia Janowo (SKM stop)
- Rumia (PKP station)
- Laghetto Rumia, a lake in San Roberto, Italy

== Botany ==
- Rumia (plant), a genus of plants in the family Apiaceae

== Other ==
- Rumia, a character in Embodiment of Scarlet Devil from the Touhou Project video game series
- Rumina, ancient Roman goddess who protected breastfeeding mothers
