= Rumia Lake =

Artificial lake in Calabria, Italy

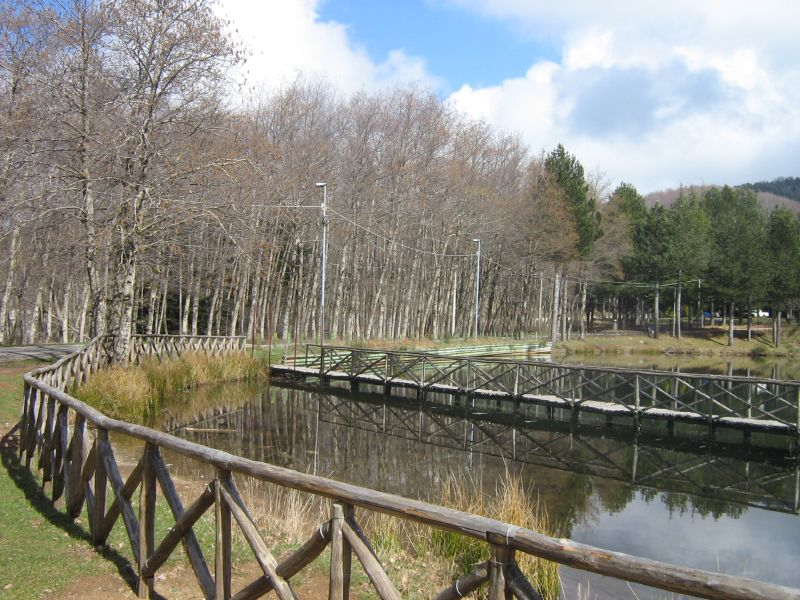

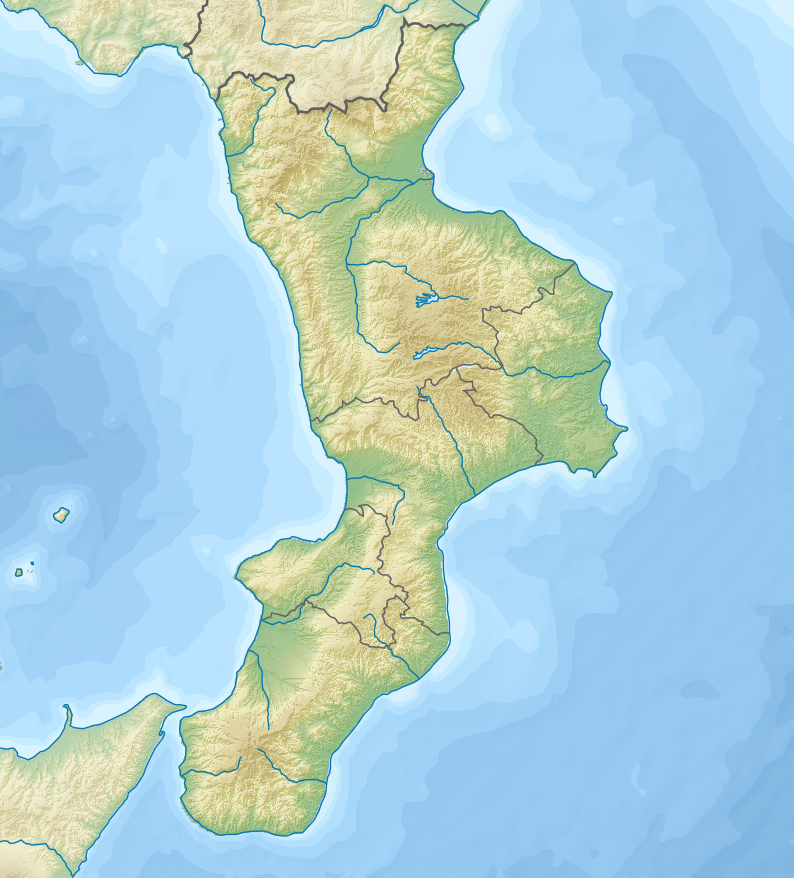
- Location in Calabria Location in Italy
- Location: San Roberto, Metropolitan City of Reggio Calabria, Calabria
- Coordinates: 38.180749°N 15.84721°E
- Basin countries: Italy
- Surface elevation: 1,300 m (4,300 ft)

Rumia Lake (Italian: Laghetto Rumia) is a small artificial lake within the Metropolitan City of Reggio Calabria. The lake is located on Aspromonte, in San Roberto, with an altitude of about 1,300 m (4,300 ft) and roughly 25 km (16 mi) from the coastline.
