= Campo Calabro =

Campo Calabro Greek: Campos
- Comune
- Comune di Campo Calabro
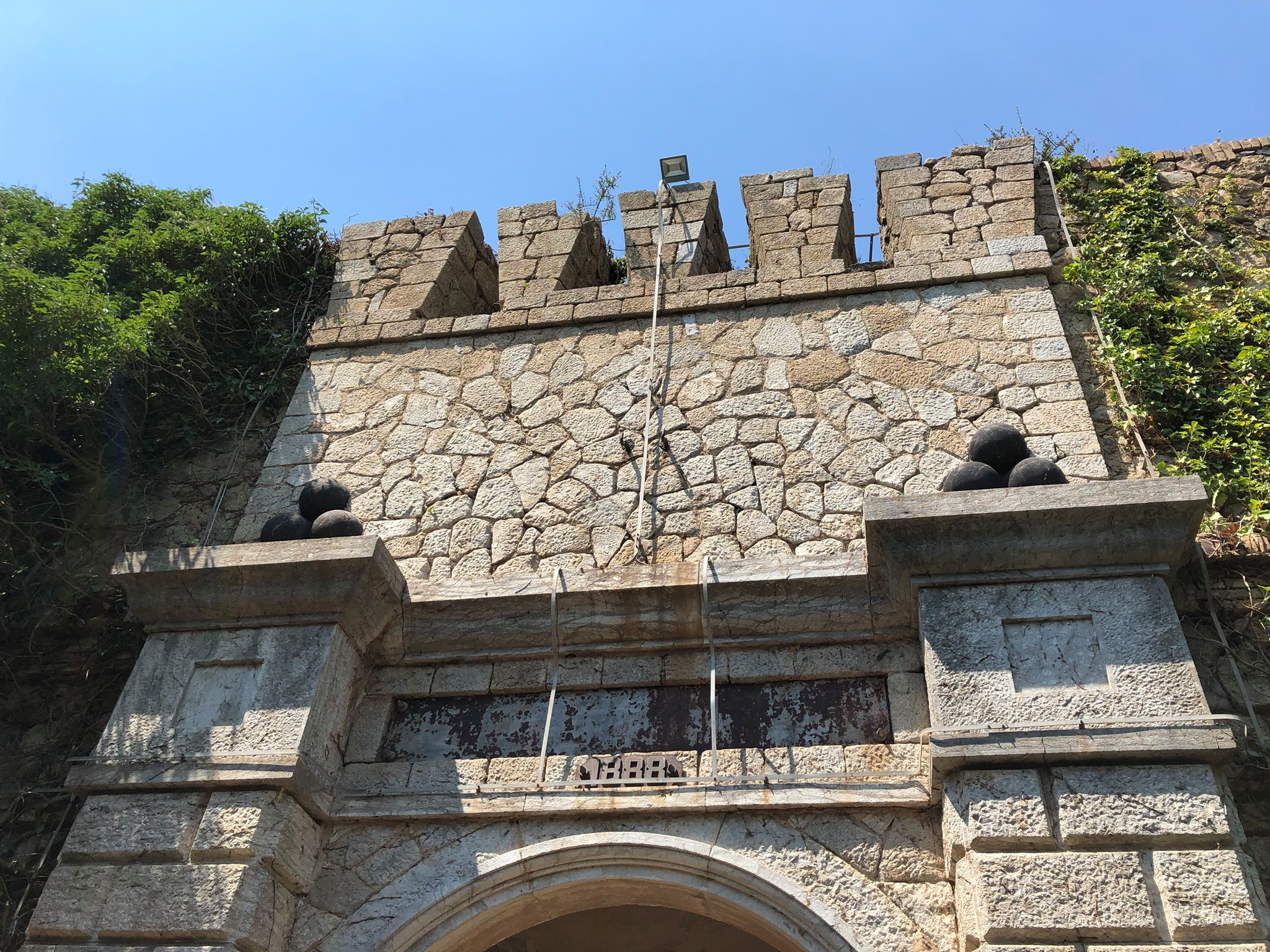

- Location within Italy Location within Calabria
- Coordinates: 38°13′N 15°40′E
- Country: Italy
- Region: Calabria
- Metropolitan city: Reggio Calabria (RC)

Area
  - Total: 8.01 km^{2} (3.09 sq mi)

Population (2025)
  - Total: 4,462
  - Density: 557/km^{2} (1,440/sq mi)
- Time zone: UTC+1 (CET)
  - Summer (DST): UTC+2 (CEST)
- Postal code: 89052
- Dialing code: 0965
- Website: Official website

Campo Calabro is a municipality in the Province of Reggio Calabria in the region of Calabria in Italy, located about 110 kilometres (68 mi) southwest of Catanzaro and about 12 kilometres (7 mi) north of Reggio Calabria. It has 4,462 inhabitants.

Campo Calabro borders the following municipalities: Fiumara, Reggio Calabria, Villa San Giovanni.

== Demographics ==
As of 2025, there are 4,462 people residing in Campo Calabro, of whom 49.3% were male and 50.7% were female. Minors total 17.4% of the population compared to pensioners who number 22.4%. This compares with the Italian average of 14.9% minors and 24.7 percent pensioners.

Historical population

Year	Pop.	±%
1861	1,998	—
1871	2,248	+12.5%
1881	2,336	+3.9%
1901	2,739	+17.3%
1911	2,603	−5.0%
1921	2,718	+4.4%
1931	2,862	+5.3%
1936	2,958	+3.4%

Year	Pop.	±%
1951	3,142	+6.2%
1961	3,084	−1.8%
1971	3,084	+0.0%
1981	3,459	+12.2%
1991	3,801	+9.9%
2001	4,074	+7.2%
2011	4,410	+8.2%
2021	4,449	+0.9%

Source: ISTAT
