= Sant'Alessio in Aspromonte =

- Comune
- Comune di Sant'Alessio in Aspromonte
- Location within Italy Location within Calabria
- Coordinates: 38°10′N 15°45′E
- Country: Italy
- Region: Calabria
- Metropolitan city: Reggio Calabria (RC)

Government
  - Mayor: Stefano Ioli Calabrò

Area
  - Total: 3.99 km^{2} (1.54 sq mi)
- Elevation: 550 m (1,800 ft)

Population (31 August 2012)
  - Total: 317
  - Density: 79.4/km^{2} (206/sq mi)
- Demonym: Santalessini or Santalessoti
- Time zone: UTC+1 (CET)
  - Summer (DST): UTC+2 (CEST)
- Postal code: 89050
- Dialing code: 0965
- Patron saint: St. Alexius of Rome
- Saint day: 2nd Sunday of August
- Website: Official website

Sant'Alessio in Aspromonte is a comune (municipality) in the Metropolitan City of Reggio Calabria in the Italian region Calabria, located about 110 kilometres (68 mi) southwest of Catanzaro and about 10 kilometres (6 mi) northeast of Reggio Calabria.

Sant'Alessio in Aspromonte borders the following municipalities: Laganadi, Reggio Calabria, Santo Stefano in Aspromonte.
