= Santo Stefano in Aspromonte =

Santo Stefano in Aspromonte Griko: Stèphanos
- Comune
- Comune di Santo Stefano in Aspromonte
- Location within Italy Location within Calabria
- Coordinates: 38°10′N 15°47′E
- Country: Italy
- Region: Calabria
- Metropolitan city: Reggio Calabria (RC)
- Frazioni: Gambarie, Mannoli

Government
  - Mayor: Francesco Malara (Civic list)

Area
  - Total: 17.7 km^{2} (6.8 sq mi)
- Elevation: 715 m (2,346 ft)

Population (Dec. 2025)
  - Total: 1,001
  - Density: 56.6/km^{2} (146/sq mi)
- Demonym: Stefaniti
- Time zone: UTC+1 (CET)
  - Summer (DST): UTC+2 (CEST)
- Postal code: 89057
- Dialing code: 0965
- Website: Official website

Santo Stefano in Aspromonte is a comune (municipality) in the Province of Reggio Calabria in the Italian region Calabria, located about 110 kilometres (68 mi) southwest of Catanzaro and about 12 kilometres (7 mi) northeast of Reggio Calabria. As of 31 December 2025, it had a population of 1,001 and an area of 17.7 square kilometres (6.8 mi^{2}).

The municipality of Santo Stefano in Aspromonte contains the frazioni (subdivisions, mainly villages and hamlets) Gambarie and Mannoli.

Santo Stefano in Aspromonte borders the following municipalities: Laganadi, Reggio Calabria, Roccaforte del Greco, San Roberto, Sant'Alessio in Aspromonte, Scilla.

== Geography ==
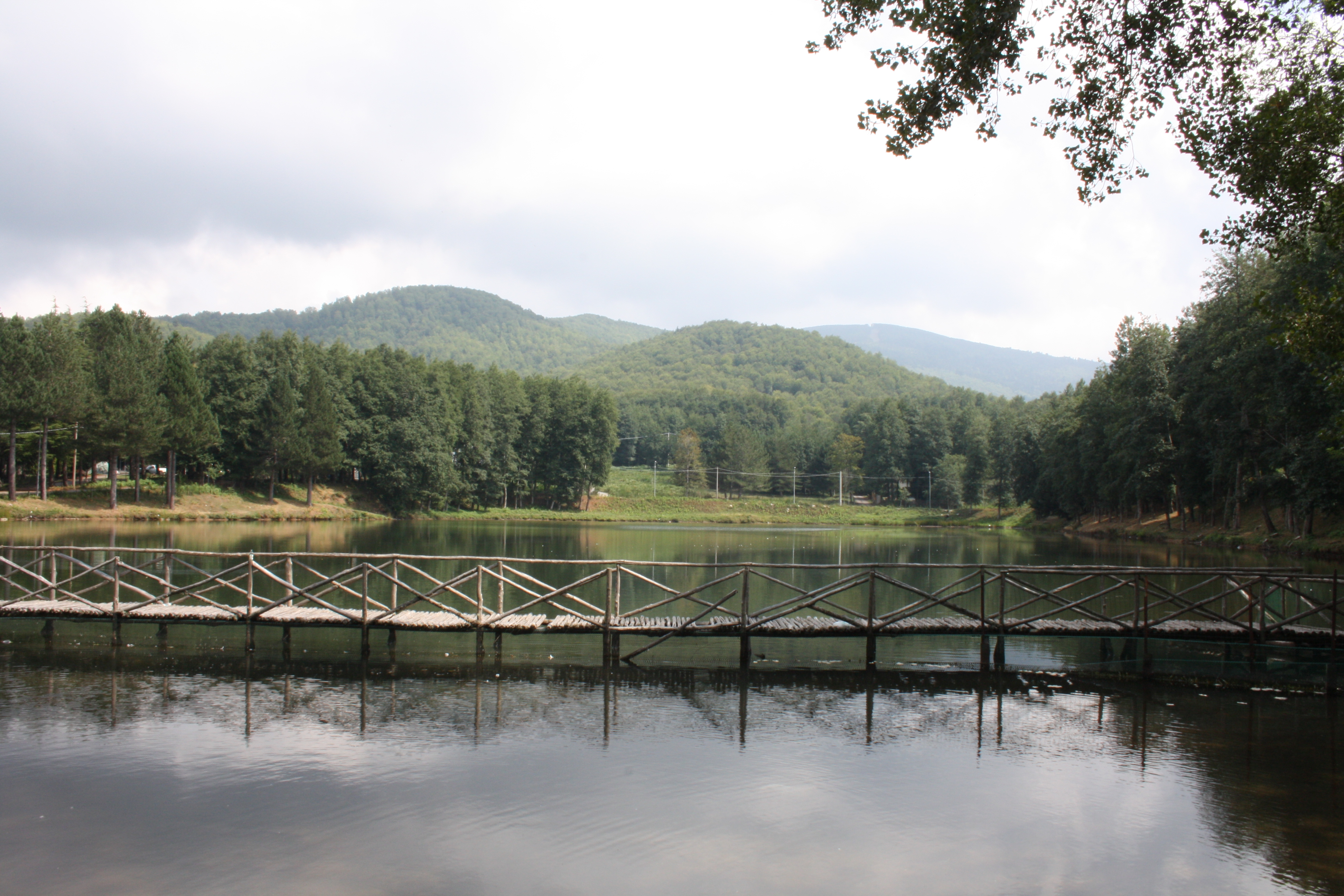
Rumia lake

Santo Stefano in Aspromonte is situated on the Tyrrhenian side of the Aspromonte range in the province of Reggio Calabria. The municipal area, which is distinctly geared towards tourism, is particularly interesting from a landscape and environmental perspective, both at lower altitudes – which are predominantly rural – and at higher altitudes, which are more developed and particularly well-suited to summer and winter holidays. Up to an altitude of 1,000 metres, the vegetation consists mainly of olive and chestnut trees; above 1,000 metres, beech, pine and fir trees predominate. At an altitude of 1,310 metres lies the winter and summer tourist resort of Gambarie, a hamlet of the municipality of Santo Stefano. From Monte Scirocco, one can enjoy unique panoramic views, overlooking the Strait of Messina, the Aeolian Islands and Mount Etna, whilst numerous picturesque streams make the land fertile. The municipal area lies at altitudes ranging from 498 to 1,795 metres above sea level.

== Monuments and places of interest ==
=== Civil architectures ===
- Monument to the flag: in the town’s main square, named after Domenico Romeo, a monument depicting the Italian flag was erected in 2004. On 29 August 1847, in this very square, Domenico Romeo raised the Italian tricolour for the first time in southern Italy, as a symbol of national unity and the cause of the Risorgimento struggles.

In the hamlet of Gambarie there are facilities for repeating RAI radio and TV signals.

== Demographics ==
Historical population

Year	Pop.	±%
1861	2,481	—
1871	2,365	−4.7%
1881	2,471	+4.5%
1901	2,580	+4.4%
1911	2,444	−5.3%
1921	2,581	+5.6%
1931	2,552	−1.1%
1936	2,555	+0.1%

Year	Pop.	±%
1951	2,586	+1.2%
1961	2,397	−7.3%
1971	2,020	−15.7%
1981	1,878	−7.0%
1991	1,472	−21.6%
2001	1,470	−0.1%
2011	1,247	−15.2%
2021	1,091	−12.5%

Source: Data from ISTAT

== Economy ==
=== Tourism ===
There are a number of accommodation and catering establishments within the municipal area, particularly near Gambarie. The ski resort offers five slopes served by ski lifts, with a maximum vertical drop of 400 metres.

== Gallery ==
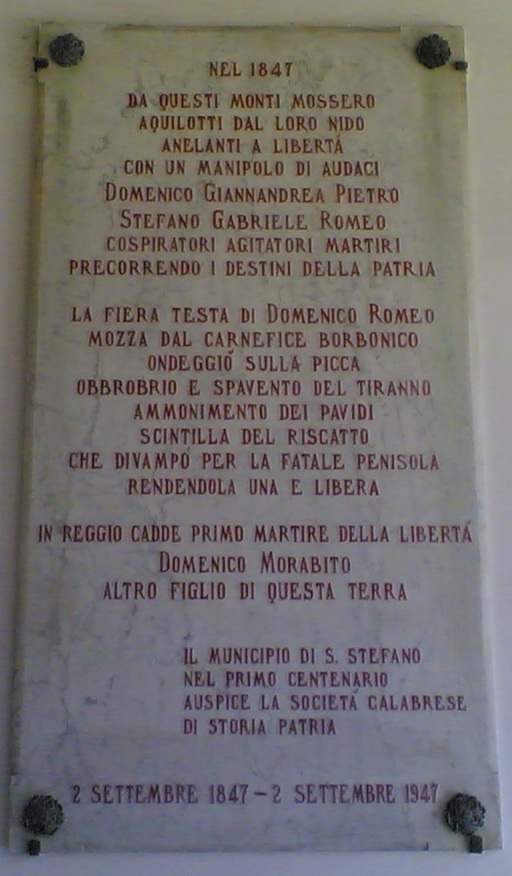
Commemorative inscription marking the centenary of the 1847 uprisings.

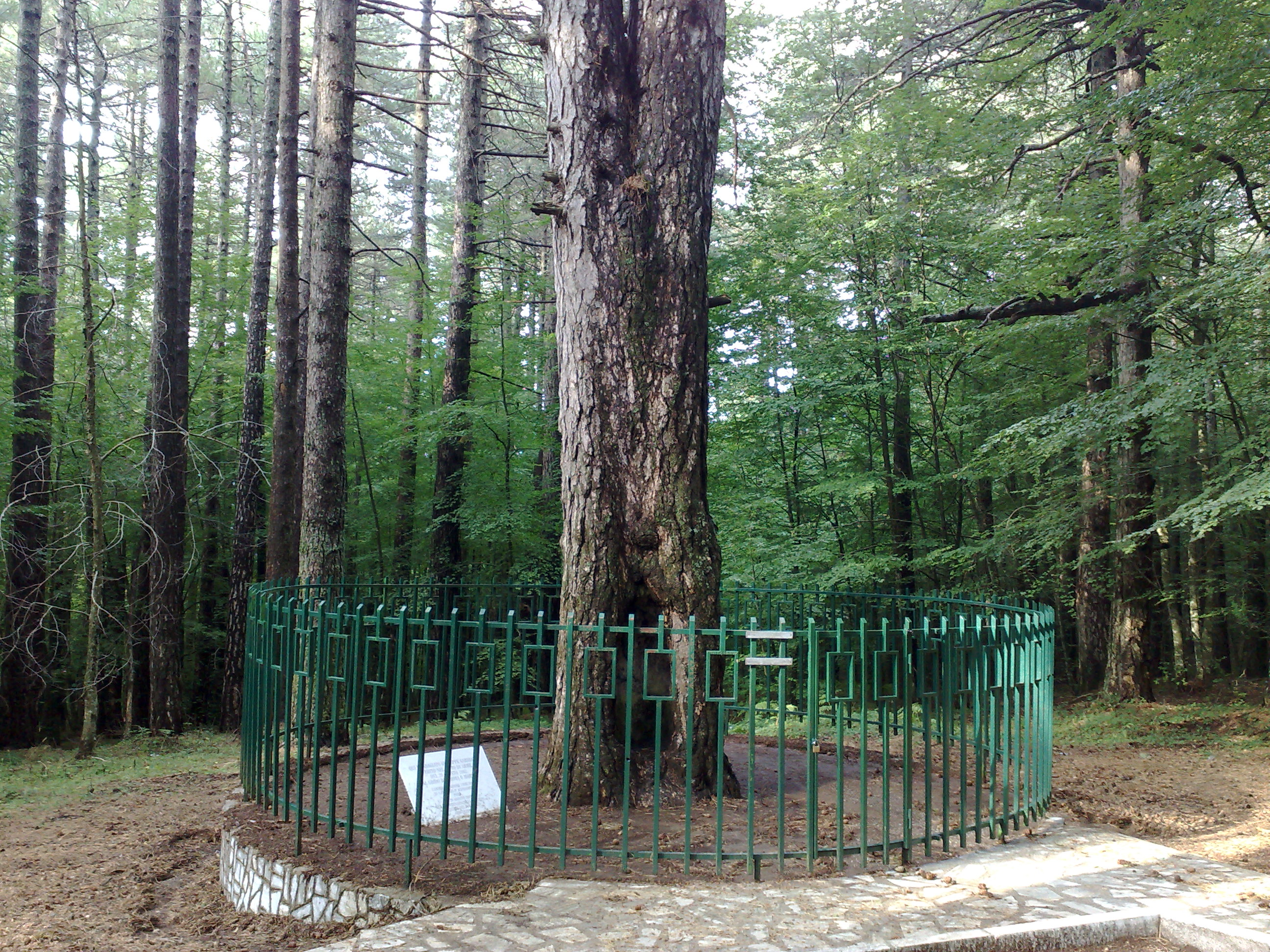
The Garibaldi memorial stone.

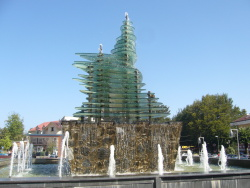
Fountain in Mangeruca Square.

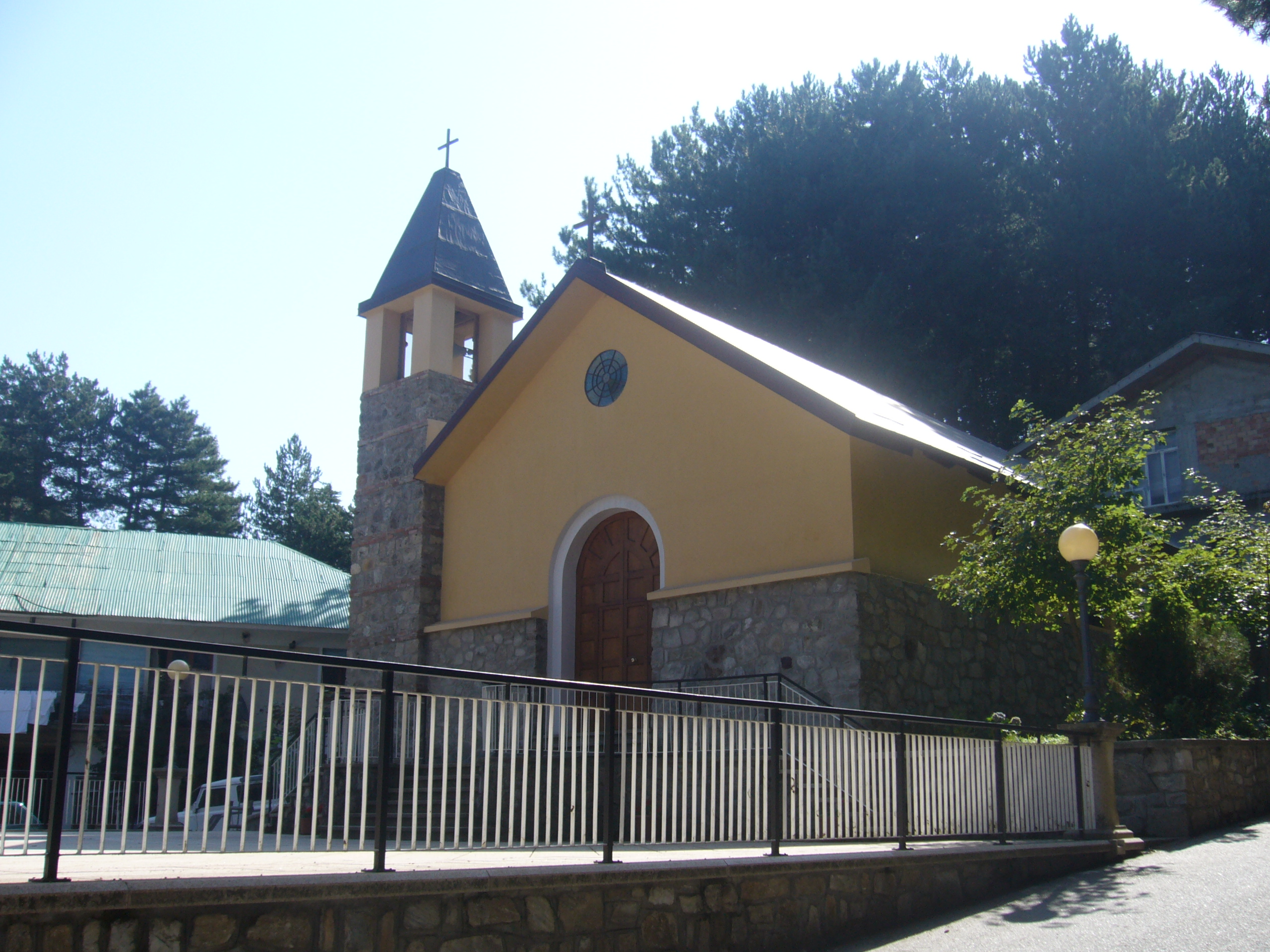
Little Church of the Sacred Heart.

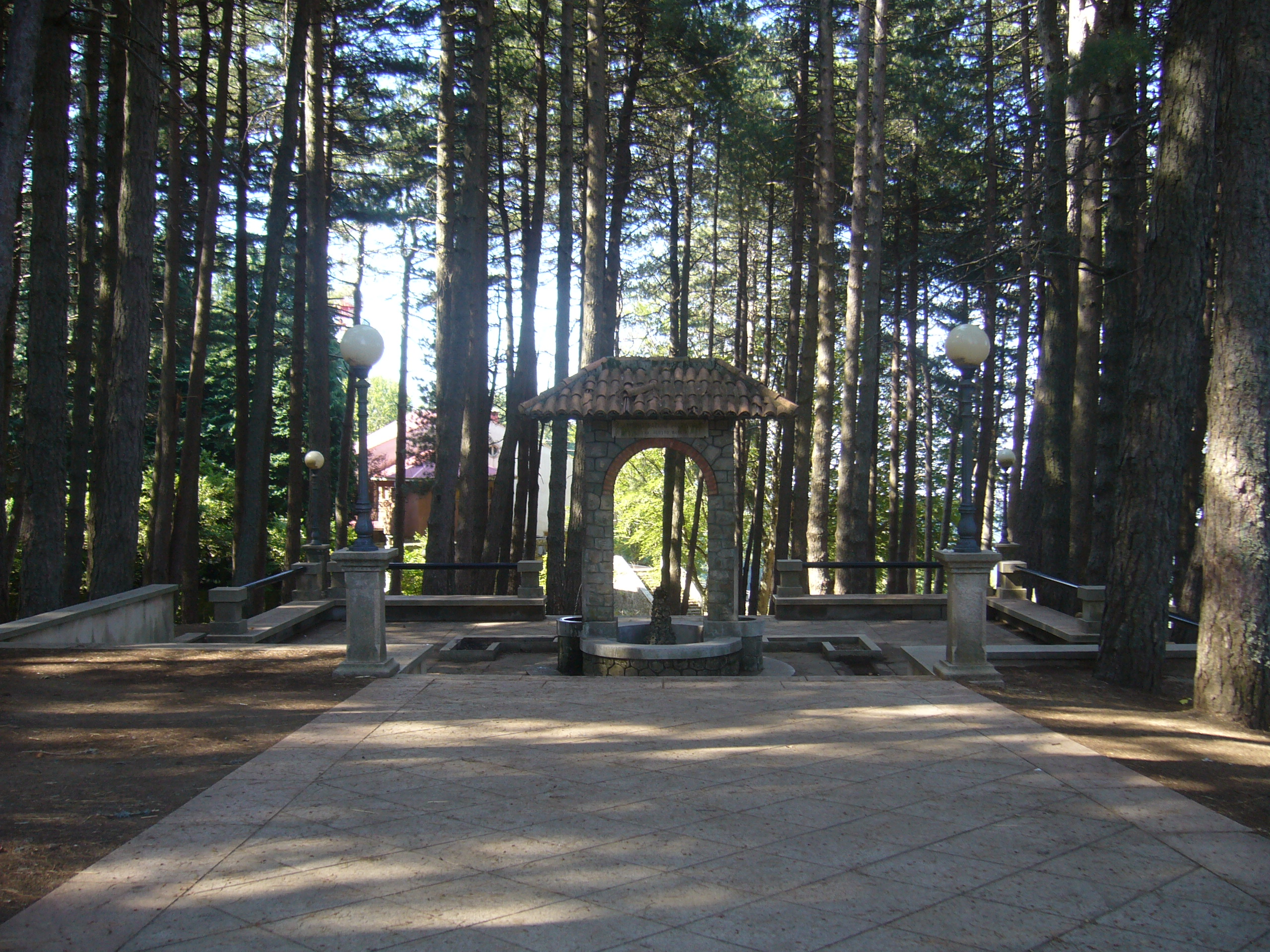
Pine grove and fountain

== Infrastructure and transport ==
- Provincial Road 7 Gallico – Gambarie
- Provincial Road 7var Gallico – Gambarie. Provincial Road 7var is a bypass of Provincial Road 7 that will provide a much smoother route between Gallico and Gambarie. The section between Gallico and Mulini di Calanna is already open to traffic.
- Provincial Road Reggio – Terreti – Gambarie

== Sports ==
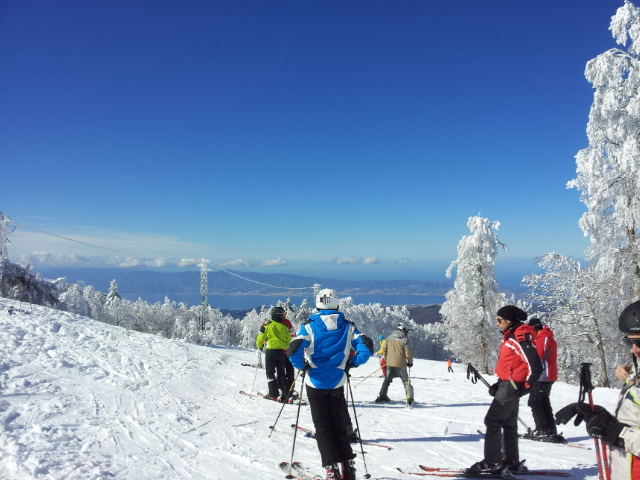
Ski trails near Gambarie overlooking the Strait of Messina

Gambarie's ski resort is one of the closest to the sea in the world, as it is situated just over the Strait of Messina. Gambarie is one of the southernmost ski resorts in Europe, being situated on the 38th parallel, while Sierra Nevada in Spain is on the 37th.

== See also ==
- Giuseppe Musolino
