= Fiumara =

Municipality in Calabria, Italy

Fiumara Greek: Kenision
- Comune
- Comune di Fiumara
- Location within Italy Location within Calabria
- Coordinates: 38°13′N 15°42′E
- Country: Italy
- Region: Calabria
- Metropolitan city: Reggio Calabria (RC)

Government
  - Mayor: Vincenzo Pensabene

Area
  - Total: 6.59 km^{2} (2.54 sq mi)
- Elevation: 192 m (630 ft)

Population (2025)
  - Total: 829
  - Density: 126/km^{2} (326/sq mi)
- Demonym: Fiumaresi
- Time zone: UTC+1 (CET)
  - Summer (DST): UTC+2 (CEST)
- Postal code: 89050
- Dialing code: 0965
- Website: Official website

Fiumara (Reggino: Sciumara 'i Muru) is a comune (municipality) in the Metropolitan City of Reggio Calabria in the region of Calabria in Italy, located about 110 kilometres (68 mi) southwest of Catanzaro and about 12 kilometres (7 mi) northeast of Reggio Calabria. It has 829 inhabitants.

Fiumara borders the following municipalities: Calanna, Campo Calabro, Reggio Calabria, San Roberto, Scilla, Villa San Giovanni.

== Demographics ==
As of 2025, there are 829 people residing in Fiumara, of whom 47.6% are male and 52.4% are female. Minors make up 10.3% of the population, and pensioners make up 29.6%. This compares with the Italian average of 14.9% minors and 24.7% pensioners.

Historical population

Year	Pop.	±%
1861	1,809	—
1871	2,007	+10.9%
1881	1,997	−0.5%
1901	2,126	+6.5%
1911	2,024	−4.8%
1921	1,989	−1.7%
1931	2,100	+5.6%
1936	2,241	+6.7%

Year	Pop.	±%
1951	2,293	+2.3%
1961	2,165	−5.6%
1971	1,822	−15.8%
1981	1,524	−16.4%
1991	1,402	−8.0%
2001	1,201	−14.3%
2011	1,021	−15.0%
2021	849	−16.8%

Source: ISTAT
