= Laganadi =

Laganadi Lacanàdi (Sicilian) Lachanádes (Greek)
- Comune
- Comune di Laganadi
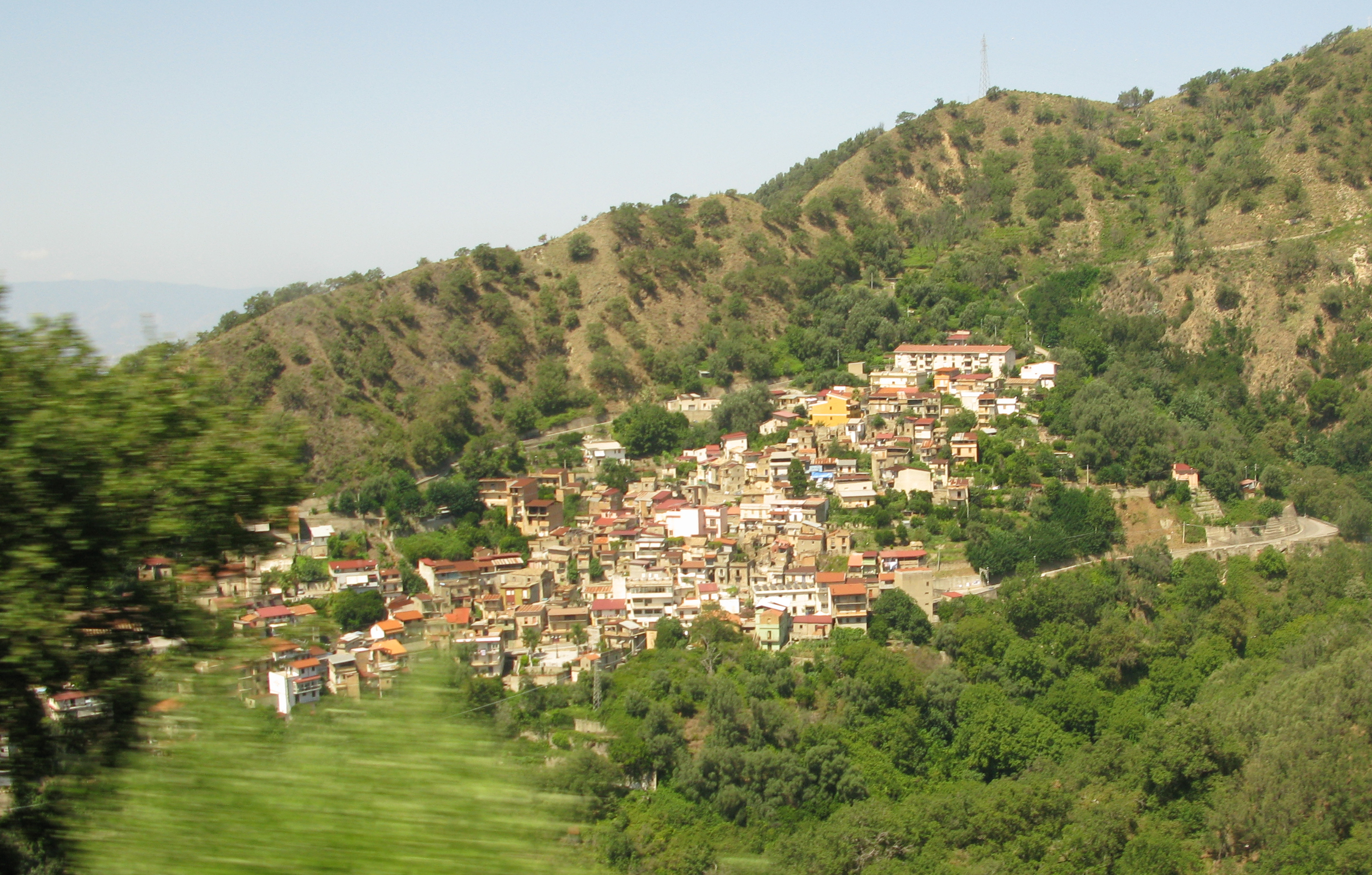

- Location within Italy Location within Calabria
- Coordinates: 38°10′N 15°45′E
- Country: Italy
- Region: Calabria
- Metropolitan city: Reggio Calabria (RC)

Area
  - Total: 8.3 km^{2} (3.2 sq mi)
- Elevation: 499 m (1,637 ft)

Population (31 May 2025)
  - Total: 323
  - Density: 39/km^{2} (100/sq mi)
- Demonym: Laganioti
- Time zone: UTC+1 (CET)
  - Summer (DST): UTC+2 (CEST)
- Postal code: 89050
- Dialing code: 0965
- Website: Official website

Laganadi (Calabrian: Lacanàdi; Calabrian Greek: Λαχανάδες, romanized: Lachanádes) is a comune (municipality) in the Metropolitan City of Reggio Calabria in the Italian region Calabria, located about 110 kilometres (68 mi) southwest of Catanzaro and about 10 kilometres (6 mi) northeast of Reggio Calabria.

Laganadi borders the following municipalities: Calanna, Reggio Calabria, San Roberto, Sant'Alessio in Aspromonte, Santo Stefano in Aspromonte.
