= Calanna =

Calanna Greek: Kalanne
- Comune
- Comune di Calanna
- Location within Italy Location within Calabria
- Coordinates: 38°11′N 15°43′E
- Country: Italy
- Region: Calabria
- Metropolitan city: Reggio Calabria (RC)

Government
  - Mayor: Domenico Romeo

Area
  - Total: 10.97 km^{2} (4.24 sq mi)
- Elevation: 511 m (1,677 ft)

Population (2025)
  - Total: 738
  - Density: 67.3/km^{2} (174/sq mi)
- Demonym: Calannesi
- Time zone: UTC+1 (CET)
  - Summer (DST): UTC+2 (CEST)
- Postal code: 89050
- Dialing code: 0965
- Website: Official website

Calanna (Calabrian Greek: Kalanè) is a municipality in the Metropolitan City of Reggio Calabria in the region of Calabria in Italy, located about 110 kilometres (68 mi) southwest of Catanzaro and about 9 kilometres (6 mi) northeast of Reggio Calabria. It has 738 inhabitants.

Calanna borders the following municipalities: Fiumara, Laganadi, Reggio Calabria, San Roberto.

== Demographics ==
Historical population

Year	Pop.	±%
1861	2,013	—
1871	2,206	+9.6%
1881	2,250	+2.0%
1901	2,332	+3.6%
1911	2,013	−13.7%
1921	2,392	+18.8%
1931	2,439	+2.0%
1936	2,520	+3.3%

Year	Pop.	±%
1951	2,377	−5.7%
1961	2,278	−4.2%
1971	1,998	−12.3%
1981	1,770	−11.4%
1991	1,446	−18.3%
2001	1,183	−18.2%
2011	979	−17.2%
2021	782	−20.1%

Source: ISTAT
