= Villafranca Tirrena =

- Comune
- Comune di Villafranca Tirrena
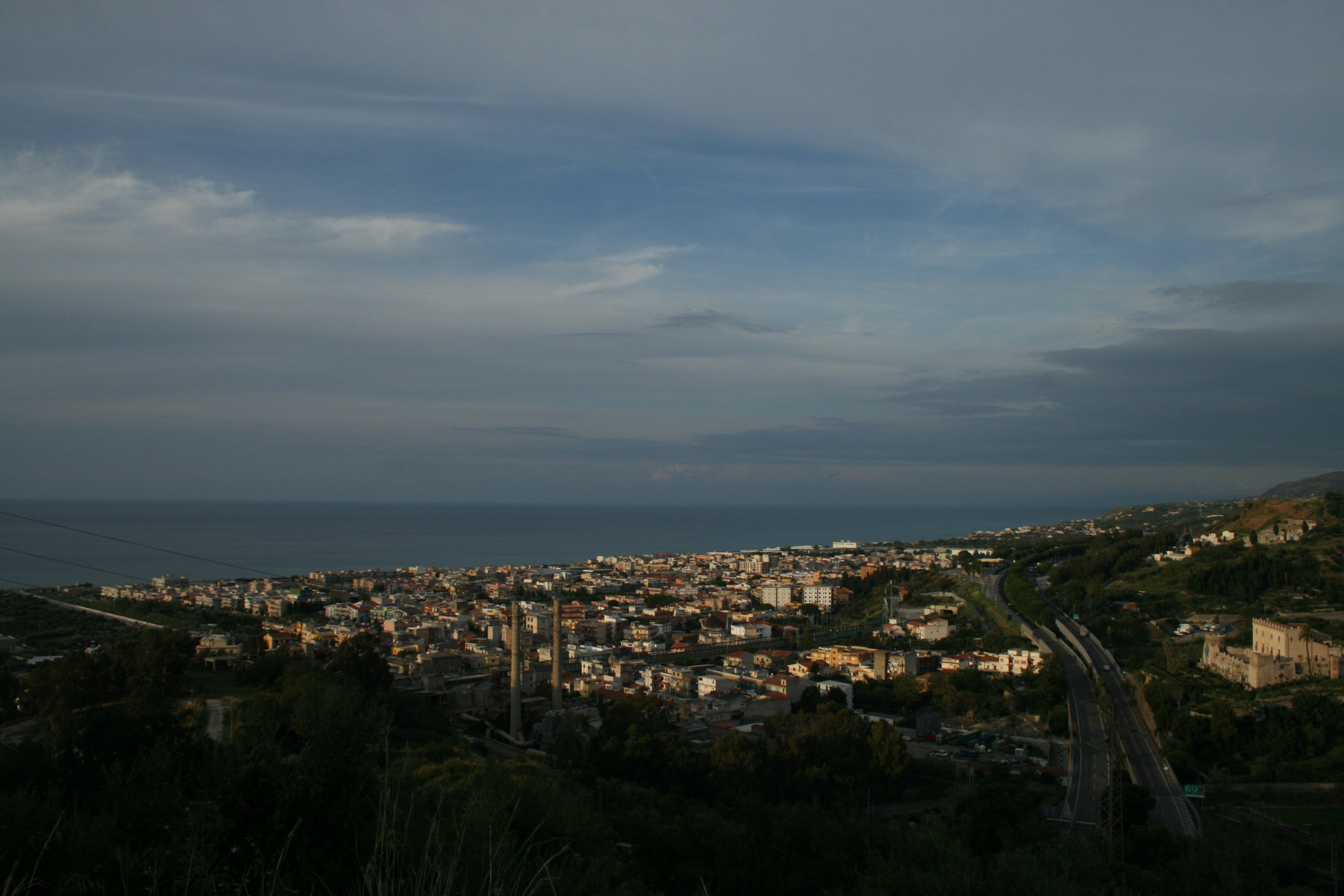
- View from the hill above the town centre

- Location of the municipality of Villafranca Tirrena within the metropolitan city of Messina

- Location within Italy Location within Sicily
- Coordinates: 38°14′N 15°26′E
- Country: Italy
- Region: Sicily
- Metropolitan city: Messina (ME)
- Frazioni: Calvaruso, Castello, Castelluccio, Divieto, Serro

Government
  - Mayor: Giuseppe Cavallaro (Civic list)

Area
  - Total: 14.3 km^{2} (5.5 sq mi)
- Elevation: 22 m (72 ft)

Population (30 November 2025)
  - Total: 7,740
  - Density: 541/km^{2} (1,400/sq mi)
- Demonym: Villafranchesi (formerly Bausoti)
- Time zone: UTC+1 (CET)
  - Summer (DST): UTC+2 (CEST)
- Postal code: 98049
- Dialing code: 090
- Website: Official website

Villafranca Tirrena is a comune (municipality) in the Metropolitan City of Messina in the Italian region Sicily, located about 180 kilometres (110 mi) east of Palermo and about 12 kilometres (7 mi) northwest of Messina.

Villafranca Tirrena borders the following municipalities: Messina, Saponara.

== Geography ==
=== Territory ===
Villafranca Tirrena borders to the north with the Tyrrhenian Sea, to the south-east with the municipality of Messina and to the north-west with the municipal territory of Saponara. Altimetrically, the territory extends between 0 and 828 m above sea level, mainly made up of hilly areas which leave space near the coast to a flat area on which a large part of the urban center stands. Most of the municipal territory is used for specialized crops (citrus groves, vineyards, olive groves).

What separates it from the municipality of Messina is the eastern border of the Gallo stream. In the western part of the territory there are the Calvaruso and Santa Caterina streams: the first starts from the hills above Calvaruso and descends to the Tyrrhenian Sea, the second has its sources in the hills of Saponara and Calvaruso and under the Bauso block of flats near the SS113 it flows into the first giving rise to a single delta.

== History ==
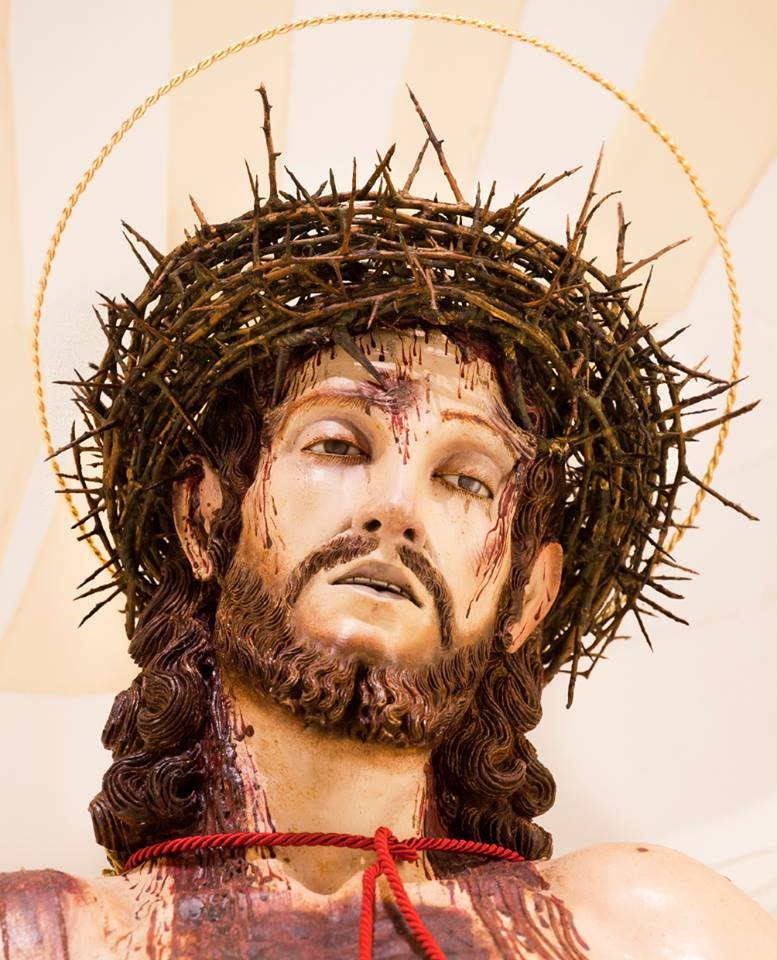
Ecce Homo, sanctuary of Calvaruso

Formerly called Bauso, Villafranca Tirrena became an independent municipality in 1825 maintaining the name of Bauso until 1929, when it changed its name to the current Villafranca Tirrena by associating the two towns of Calvaruso and Saponara (the latter became independent in 1952).

The first documented news dates back to 1271 when King Charles of Anjou assigned the Bàusus fief to Pierre Gruyer, which had previously belonged to Enrico de Dissinto. In the Aragonese era, the Bauso fiefdom together with the nearby Calvaruso belonged to various noble families (Manna, Gioeni, Giovanni da Taranto) until reaching the treasurer of the Kingdom Nicolò Castagna in 1399, upon whose death the fiefdoms went as dowry to his niece Pina and through women they passed first to the Bonifacios and then to the Ventimiglias, La Grua, Pollicino, Merulla and Spadafora. In 1548, the barony of Bauso was purchased by Giovanni Nicola Cottone. In 1590 Stefano Cottone had the castle rebuilt there, in 1591, Emperor Philip II elevated the fiefdom of Bauso to a county and in 1623 Philip IV of Spain invested Giuseppe Cottone with the title of Prince of Castelnuovo (another name for the Bauso county). In the eighteenth century, Abbot Vito Amico informs us that the territory of Bauso was cultivated with orchards and mulberry trees. and that the air was unhealthy. From other documents we know that the town, with its warehouse located in the current Piazza Dante, at the time Piazza del Fondaco, already active in the century. XVI, it was a stopping point along the Palermo-Messina road. In 1819, the land of Bauso and the castle with the attached title of prince of Castelnuovo, were sold by Carlo Cottone Cedronio to Domenico Marcello Pettini, former judge of the Grand Civil Court of Palermo, who purchased it for 9,000 onze.

== Symbols ==
The coat of arms consists of a Samnite shield in which, on a blue background, a lion crowned with gold is depicted, holding a twig of silver-flowered cotton between its paws. Motto: Potentior. The banner is a blue cloth

== Monuments and places of interest ==
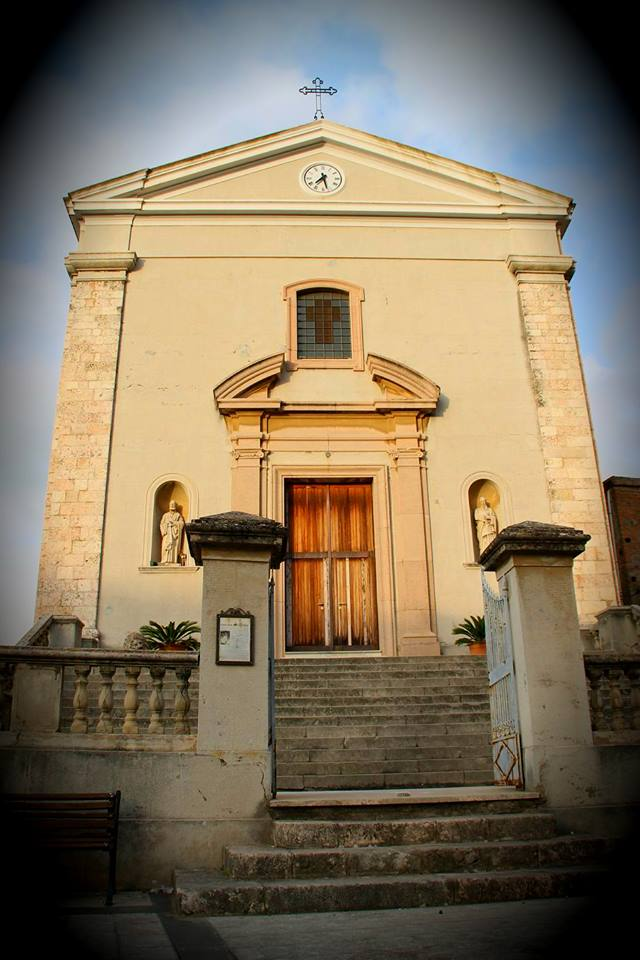
Mother Church of San Nicolò di Bari

=== Religious architecture ===
- Church of Our Lady of Lourdes: it was finished in 1976 and consecrated on 26 June of the same year.
- Church of San Gregorio Magno: building specifically dedicated to Christian religious worship.
- Mother Church of San Nicolò di Bari (Castle). The mother church dedicated to San Nicolò of Bari, patron saint of Villafranca Tirrena, was built in the 19th century, probably on the remains of an ecclesiastical building from a previous era.
- Church of the Madonna dei Cerei: on the hill, in the Serro village, there is the parish church dedicated to the Madonna dei Cerei (Candelora).
- Church of the Madonna delle Grazie: a church located near the mother church, very ancient, owned by a local family.
- Mother church of Calvaruso: it is divided into three naves according to the late Renaissance style. The origins of the church can be traced back to 1607, as can be seen on the portal on the left side, by the Moncada Princes who had built it in honor of the virgin and martyr Saint Margaret of Antioch, patron saint of Calvaruso.
- Sanctuary of Ecce Homo (Calvaruso): most notable is the marvelous image of the Ecce Homo, sculpted in cypress wood in 1634 by the artist friar Giovan Francesco Pitorno of the Observant Fathers known as Friar Umile da Petralia.

=== Military architecture ===
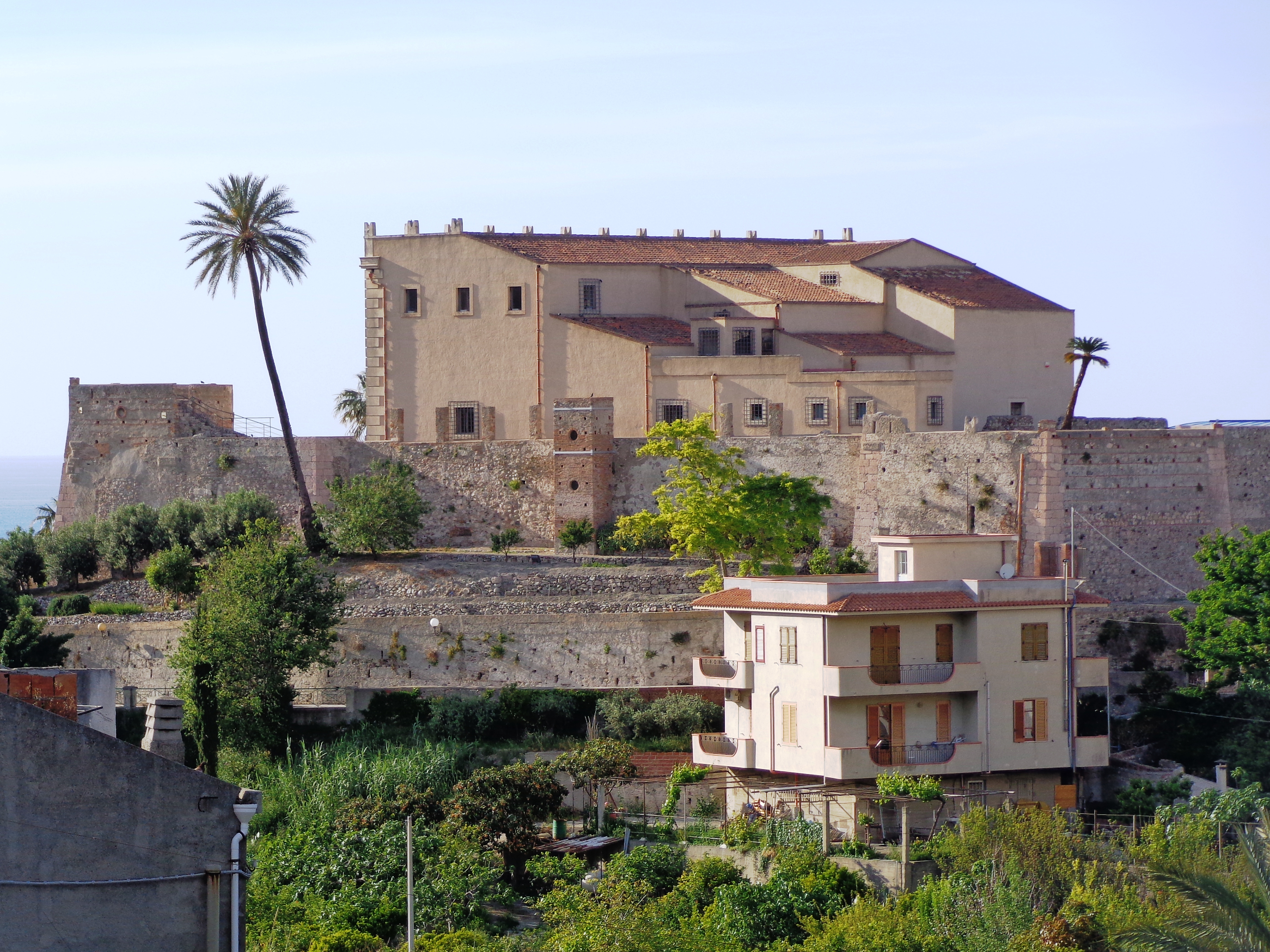
Bauso Castle in 2014

- Bauso Castle: is called Castelnuovo and from it, which dominates the town, the principality took its title, which occupied the XXXI place in the general parliament of Sicily. Starting from 1819, the Pettini family enriched the building with marble reliefs and busts with portraits of ancestors. They are also responsible for the creation of a splendid "Italian garden" around the castle.

After a period of abandonment, the castle was reopened to the public in 2003 and today the restoration work is being completed which will bring the ancient noble residence, with its sumptuous garden, back to its original splendor.

== Society ==
=== Demographic evolution ===
Historical population

Year	Pop.	±%
1861	2,787	—
1871	2,917	+4.7%
1881	3,396	+16.4%
1901	3,779	+11.3%
1911	3,280	−13.2%
1921	3,429	+4.5%

Year	Pop.	±%
1931	3,924	+14.4%
1936	4,336	+10.5%
1951	4,652	+7.3%
1961	4,859	+4.4%
1971	5,790	+19.2%
1981	6,737	+16.4%

Year	Pop.	±%
1991	7,372	+9.4%
2001	8,517	+15.5%
2011	8,748	+2.7%
2021	8,148	−6.9%

Source: Data from ISTAT

== Culture ==
=== Instruction ===
In the Municipality there is a Comprehensive Institute that groups together nursery schools, primary schools and lower secondary schools.

=== Museums ===
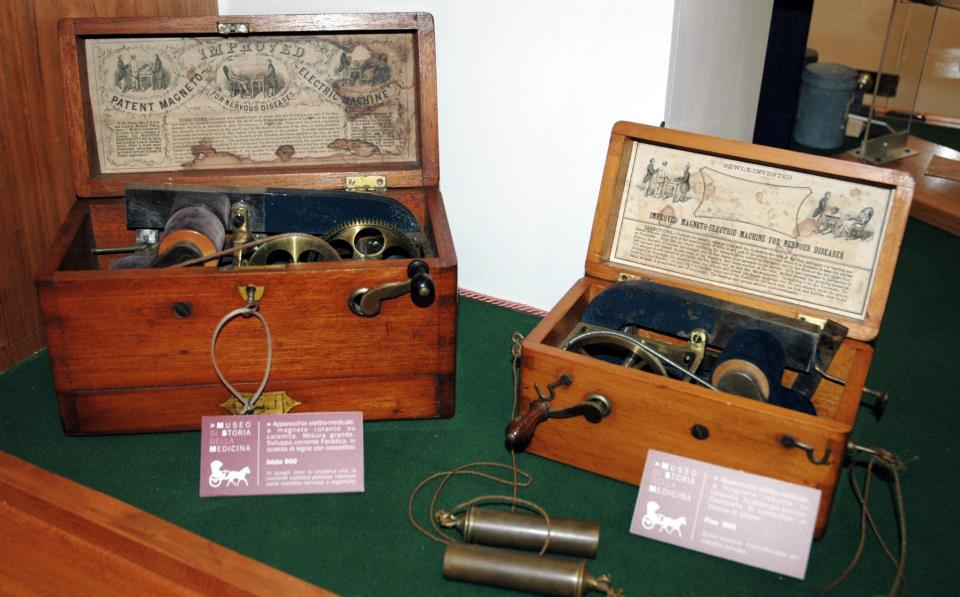
History of Medicine Museum "Ottavio Badessa", detail of electromedical equipment

- Museum of the History of Medicine: is dedicated to the memory of Doctor Ottavio Badessa. Born in 1898 in Bauso and inaugurated in 2004 after an agreement stipulated between the municipal administration and the doctor Paolo Badessa, it is located in an Art Nouveau building in Via Rovere.

=== Events ===
- Historical procession of St. Nicholas Day: ancient Villafranche tradition of «Bamparizzu» is repeated on December 5th on the eve of the patron Saint San Nicola.

== Infrastructure and transport ==
=== Roads ===
- State road 113 Northern Sicilian Messina - Palermo
- Villafranca Tirrena is crossed by the A20 motorway Messina-Palermo.

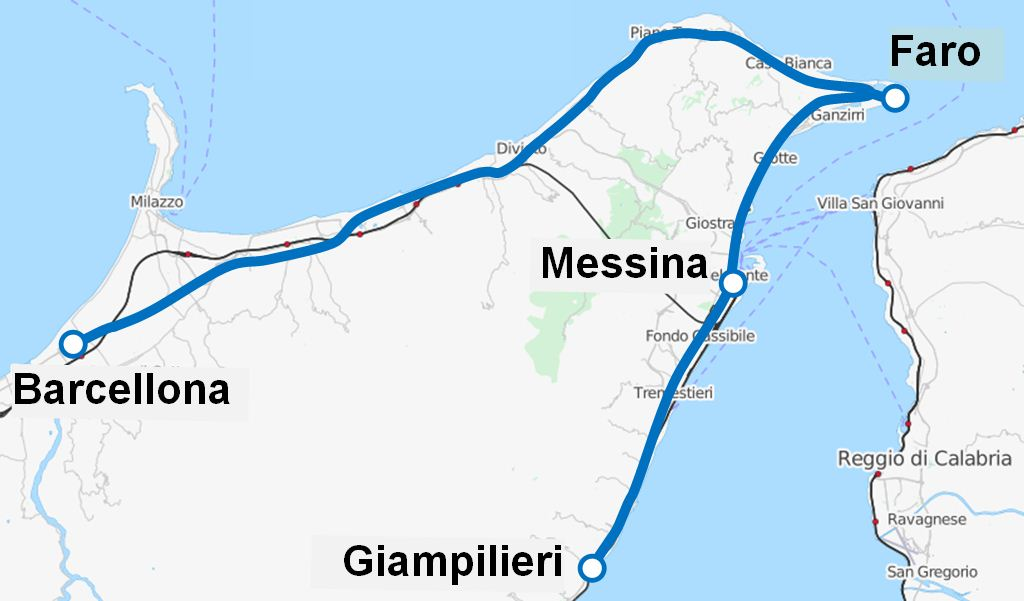
Extra-urban tramways of Messina

=== Railways ===
The municipality is served by the Villafranca Tirrena-Saponara station located on the Messina-Palermo railway. Located along the state road 113, between 1890 and 1932 the town was served by the "Bauso" station of the Messina-Barcelona tramway, managed by SATS.

=== Bus Service ===
The municipality is served both by AST the public company controlled by the Sicilian Region that manages interurban public transport on the island, private extra-urban transport companies.

Since March 2025 the Municipality has served by some urban and extra-urban bus service of ATM Messina with lines 32, 33, 33bis and two months later also lines 25 and 26.
