= Saponara =

Saponara Σαπονάρα (Greek)
- Comune
- Comune di Saponara
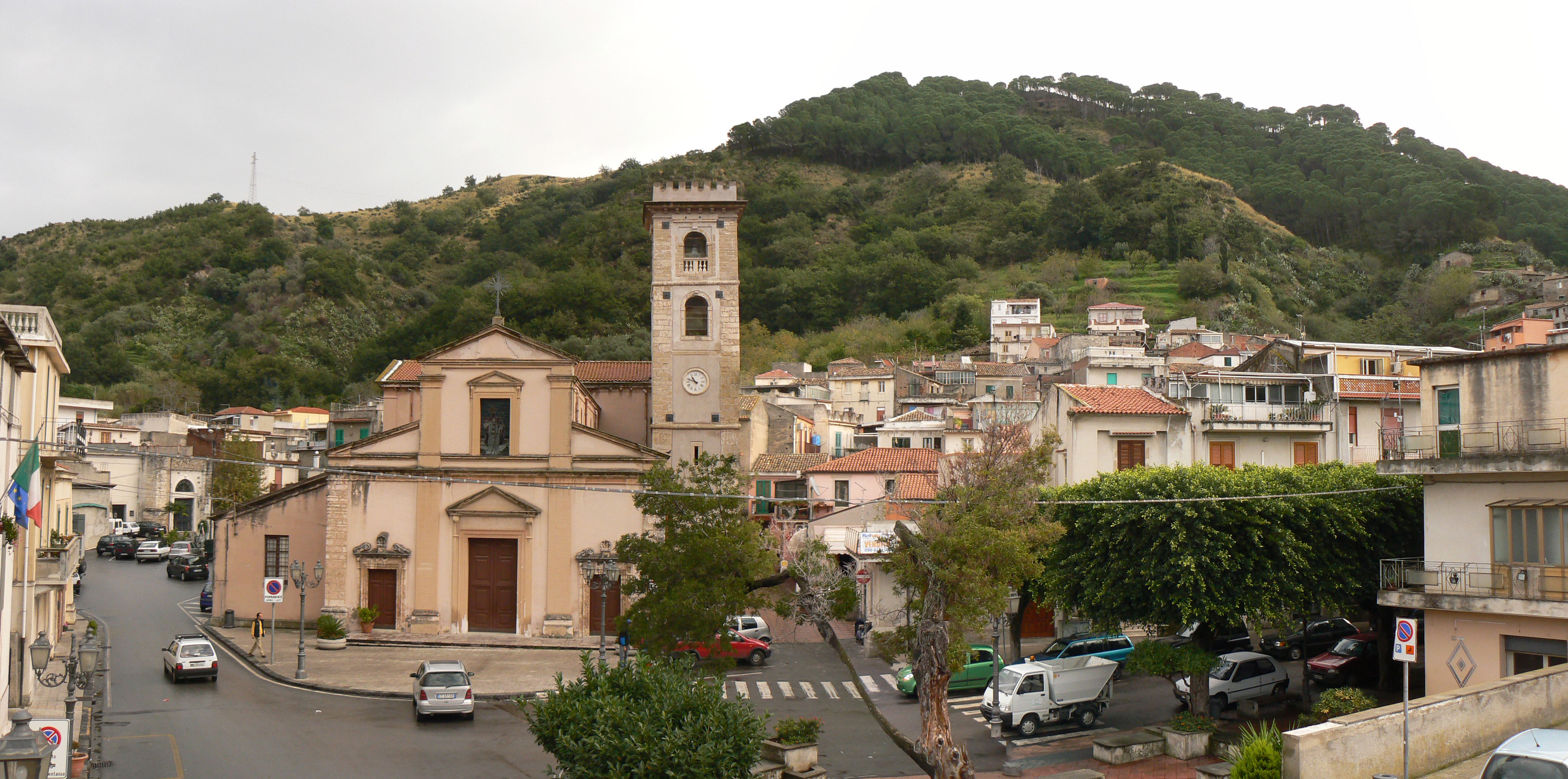
- Saponara

- Location within Italy Location within Sicily
- Coordinates: 38°12′N 15°26′E
- Country: Italy
- Region: Sicily
- Metropolitan city: Messina (ME)

Government
  - Mayor: Fabio Vinci

Area
  - Total: 26.0 km^{2} (10.0 sq mi)
- Elevation: 160 m (520 ft)

Population (31 March 2012)
  - Total: 4,116
  - Density: 158/km^{2} (410/sq mi)
- Demonym: Saponaresi
- Time zone: UTC+1 (CET)
  - Summer (DST): UTC+2 (CEST)
- Postal code: 98047
- Dialing code: 090
- Patron saint: St. Nicholas of Bari
- Saint day: 6 December
- Website: Official website

Saponara (Sicilian: Sapunara) is a comune (municipality) in the Metropolitan City of Messina in the Italian region Sicily, located about 180 kilometres (110 mi) east of Palermo and about 10 kilometres (6 mi) west of Messina.

Saponara borders the following municipalities: Messina, Rometta, Villafranca Tirrena.
