= San Roberto =

- Comune
- Comune di San Roberto
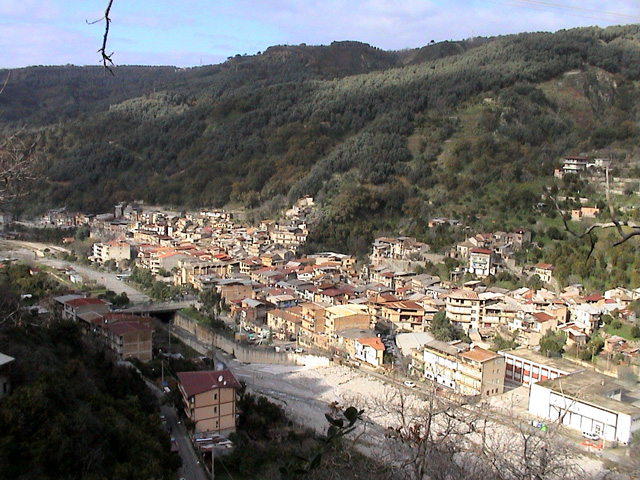

- Location within Italy Location within Calabria
- Coordinates: 38°12′N 15°44′E
- Country: Italy
- Region: Calabria
- Metropolitan city: Reggio Calabria (RC)

Government
  - Mayor: Giuseppe Roberto Vizzari

Area
  - Total: 34.3 km^{2} (13.2 sq mi)
- Elevation: 300 m (980 ft)

Population (Dec. 2004)
  - Total: 2,034
  - Density: 59.3/km^{2} (154/sq mi)
- Time zone: UTC+1 (CET)
  - Summer (DST): UTC+2 (CEST)
- Postal code: 89050
- Dialing code: 0965

San Roberto is a comune (municipality) in the Province of Reggio Calabria in the Italian region Calabria, located about 110 kilometres (68 mi) southwest of Catanzaro and about 12 kilometres (7 mi) northeast of Reggio Calabria. As of 31 December 2004, it had a population of 2,034 and an area of 34.3 square kilometres (13.2 mi^{2}).

San Roberto borders the following municipalities: Calanna, Fiumara, Laganadi, Santo Stefano in Aspromonte, Scilla.

== Demographic evolution ==
Historical population

Year	Pop.	±%
1861	1,789	—
1871	1,833	+2.5%
1881	1,853	+1.1%
1901	2,385	+28.7%
1911	2,130	−10.7%

Year	Pop.	±%
1921	2,273	+6.7%
1931	2,372	+4.4%
1936	2,503	+5.5%
1951	3,156	+26.1%
1961	3,003	−4.8%

Year	Pop.	±%
1971	2,476	−17.5%
1981	2,654	+7.2%
1991	2,668	+0.5%
2001	1,985	−25.6%

Source: Data from ISTAT
