= List of municipalities of the Metropolitan City of Palermo =

This is a list of the 82 municipalities (comuni) of the Metropolitan City of Palermo in the autonomous region of Sicily in Italy.

== List ==
Municipality	Population (2026)	Area (km²)	Density
Alia	3,138	45.98	68.2
Alimena	1,822	59.70	30.5
Aliminusa	1,005	13.68	73.5
Altavilla Milicia	9,055	23.78	380.8
Altofonte	9,742	35.44	274.9
Bagheria	53,152	29.84	1,781.2
Balestrate	6,379	6.43	992.1
Baucina	1,838	24.47	75.1
Belmonte Mezzagno	10,678	29.29	364.6
Bisacquino	3,938	64.97	60.6
Blufi	822	21.98	37.4
Bolognetta	4,074	27.63	147.4
Bompietro	1,140	42.41	26.9
Borgetto	7,167	26.02	275.4
Caccamo	7,529	188.23	40.0
Caltavuturo	3,323	97.95	33.9
Campofelice di Fitalia	411	35.46	11.6
Campofelice di Roccella	7,870	14.51	542.4
Campofiorito	1,113	21.70	51.3
Camporeale	2,842	38.72	73.4
Capaci	11,482	6.12	1,876.1
Carini	41,134	76.60	537.0
Castelbuono	7,871	60.79	129.5
Casteldaccia	11,778	33.92	347.2
Castellana Sicula	2,885	73.20	39.4
Castronovo di Sicilia	2,729	201.04	13.6
Cefalà Diana	962	9.06	106.2
Cefalù	13,846	66.24	209.0
Cerda	4,771	43.83	108.9
Chiusa Sclafani	2,378	57.55	41.3
Ciminna	3,319	56.42	58.8
Cinisi	12,201	33.16	367.9
Collesano	3,609	108.17	33.4
Contessa Entellina	1,437	136.48	10.5
Corleone	10,162	229.46	44.3
Ficarazzi	12,913	3.53	3,658.1
Gangi	5,918	127.47	46.4
Geraci Siculo	1,636	113.35	14.4
Giardinello	2,229	12.88	173.1
Giuliana	1,626	24.14	67.4
Godrano	981	38.99	25.2
Gratteri	853	38.17	22.3
Isnello	1,393	51.00	27.3
Isola delle Femmine	6,963	3.57	1,950.4
Lascari	3,769	10.33	364.9
Lercara Friddi	6,042	37.43	161.4
Marineo	5,944	33.43	177.8
Mezzojuso	2,499	49.27	50.7
Misilmeri	29,197	69.49	420.2
Monreale	38,844	530.18	73.3
Montelepre	5,653	9.89	571.6
Montemaggiore Belsito	2,745	32.08	85.6
Palazzo Adriano	1,694	130.10	13.0
Palermo	626,273	160.59	3,899.8
Partinico	30,929	108.06	286.2
Petralia Soprana	2,807	56.10	50.0
Petralia Sottana	2,349	178.35	13.2
Piana degli Albanesi	5,171	64.92	79.7
Polizzi Generosa	2,745	134.66	20.4
Pollina	2,807	49.93	56.2
Prizzi	3,999	95.04	42.1
Roccamena	1,283	33.72	38.0
Roccapalumba	2,119	31.57	67.1
San Cipirello	4,787	20.85	229.6
San Giuseppe Jato	7,886	29.78	264.8
San Mauro Castelverde	1,279	114.37	11.2
Santa Cristina Gela	1,006	38.74	26.0
Santa Flavia	10,983	14.60	752.3
Sciara	2,424	31.19	77.7
Scillato	564	31.70	17.8
Sclafani Bagni	344	134.90	2.6
Termini Imerese	24,625	78.19	314.9
Terrasini	13,126	19.85	661.3
Torretta	4,440	25.54	173.8
Trabia	10,844	20.57	527.2
Trappeto	3,143	4.19	750.1
Ustica	1,323	8.24	160.6
Valledolmo	3,051	25.78	118.3
Ventimiglia di Sicilia	1,708	26.90	63.5
Vicari	2,347	86.01	27.3
Villabate	19,380	3.80	5,100.0
Villafrati	3,064	25.64	119.5

== See also ==
- List of municipalities of Sicily
- List of municipalities of Italy
