= Province of Palermo =

Former province of Sicily, Italy

Coordinates: 38°06′56″N 13°21′41″E

- Province (1860–2015)
- Flag Coat of arms

- Map highlighting the location of the province of Palermo in Italy
- Country: Italy
- Region: Sicilia
- Capital(s): Palermo
- Comuni: 82

Area
  - Total: 4,992 km^{2} (1,927 sq mi)

Population (2012)
  - Total: 1,249,533
  - Density: 250.3/km^{2} (648.3/sq mi)
- Time zone: UTC+1 (CET)
  - Summer (DST): UTC+2 (CEST)
- Postal code: 90010, 90010-90035, 90037-90049, 90100
- Telephone prefix: 091, 0921, 0924
- Vehicle registration: PA
- ISTAT: 082
- Website: www.provincia.palermo.it

The province of Palermo (Italian: provincia di Palermo; Sicilian: pruvincia di Palermu) was a province in the autonomous region of Sicily, a major island in Southern Italy. Its capital was the city of Palermo. On 4 August 2015, it was replaced by the Metropolitan City of Palermo.

== History and location ==
Its name is derived from the Latin word Panormus. From 1072 to 1194 Palermo was the capital of the Kingdom of Sicily before Naples became the new capital under the rule of the French Angevin dynasty. It has also been ruled by the Romans, Byzantines, Normans, Arabs, Spanish Empire and Americans (during part of the Second World War). Historical accounts recording the existence of the province date back to the 8th and 6th century BC. The province is surrounded by Tyrrhenian Sea in the north, province of Trapani in the west, the provinces of Agrigento and Caltanissetta in the south, Enna in the southeast and Messina in the east. It is popular for its beaches, namely Mondello. The land is mountainous and includes Pollina and Imera Valleys. Madonie Range is located in the province.

== Administration and demographics ==
The province of Palermo had 82 comuni (sing.: comune), 1,249,533 inhabitants, (24.9% of the Sicilian population) and is 4,992 square kilometres (1,927 mi^{2}) (19.4% of the Sicilian territory). Some major towns of the province are Palermo, Alia, Alimena, Sclafani Bagni and Petralia Soprana. In 1840, for the purpose of administration the province was divided into four districts – Palermo, Corleone, Termini and Cefalu.

== Economy and tourism ==
Service is the most important economic sector for the province, accounting for three-quarters of the total employment opportunities, while the industry and agriculture employ 18% and 6% of the population respectively. The unemployment rate is high. Tourism is also an important industry. A few major tourist destinations include Arab-Norman Palatine Chapel, Church of St. John of the Hermits, Palazzo Abatellis, Gothic Palazzo Chiaramonte and National Gallery of Sicily. The seat of the Sicilian parliament is located in the province. A cathedral containing the tombs of Frederick II and other rulers is also a well known tourist attraction. The Madonie Regional Park is also located in the province. It has an airport called Falcone-Borsellino Airport, which serves about a million passengers every year, while the local port serves about half a million passengers every year. From July to September the province is a tourist mecca.

== See also ==
Media related to Metropolitan city of Palermo at Wikimedia Commons

- Metropolitan City of Palermo
