= Apollonia (Sicily) =

Ancient Sicilian city

Coordinates: 38°00′N 14°09′E

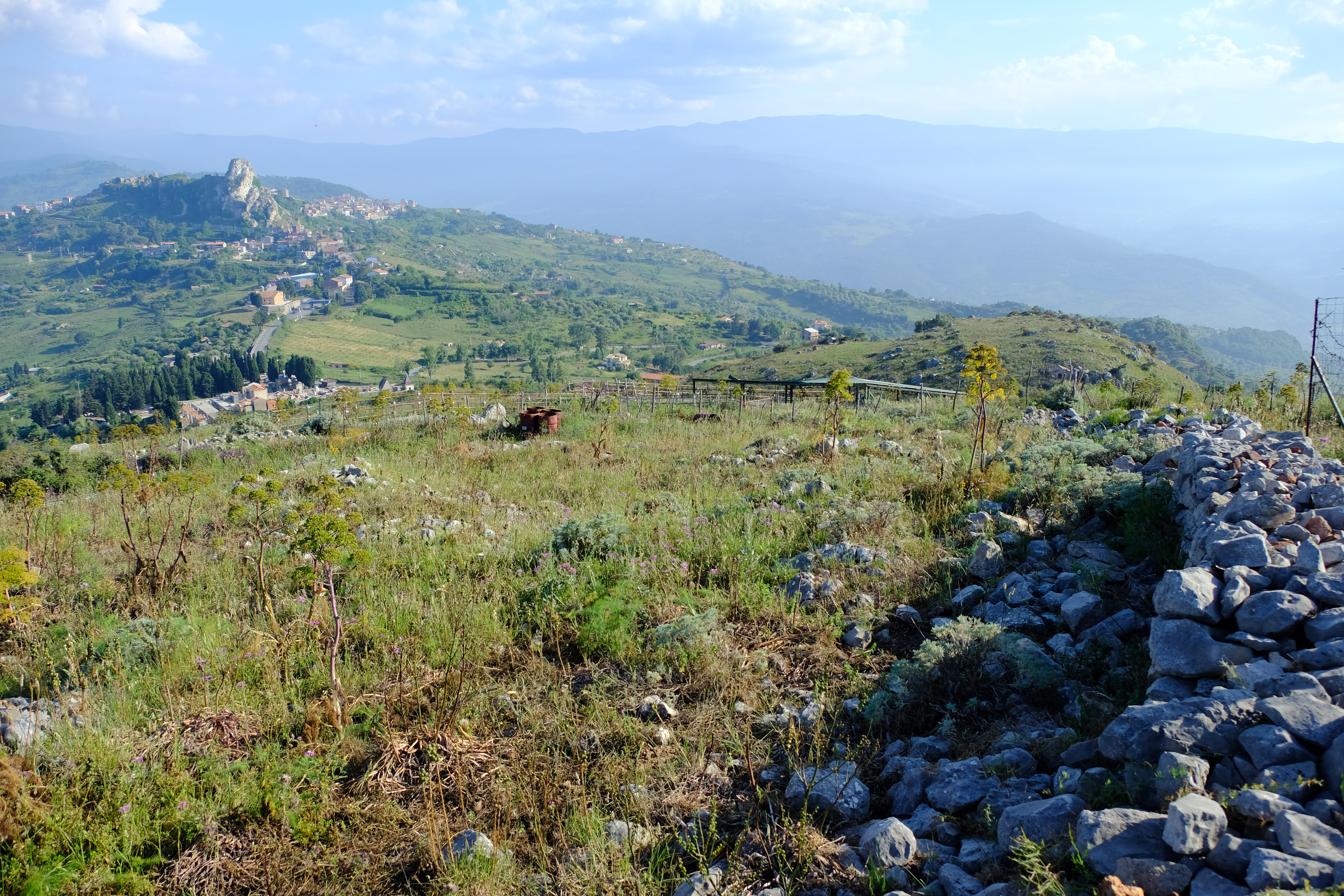
Remains of Apollonia

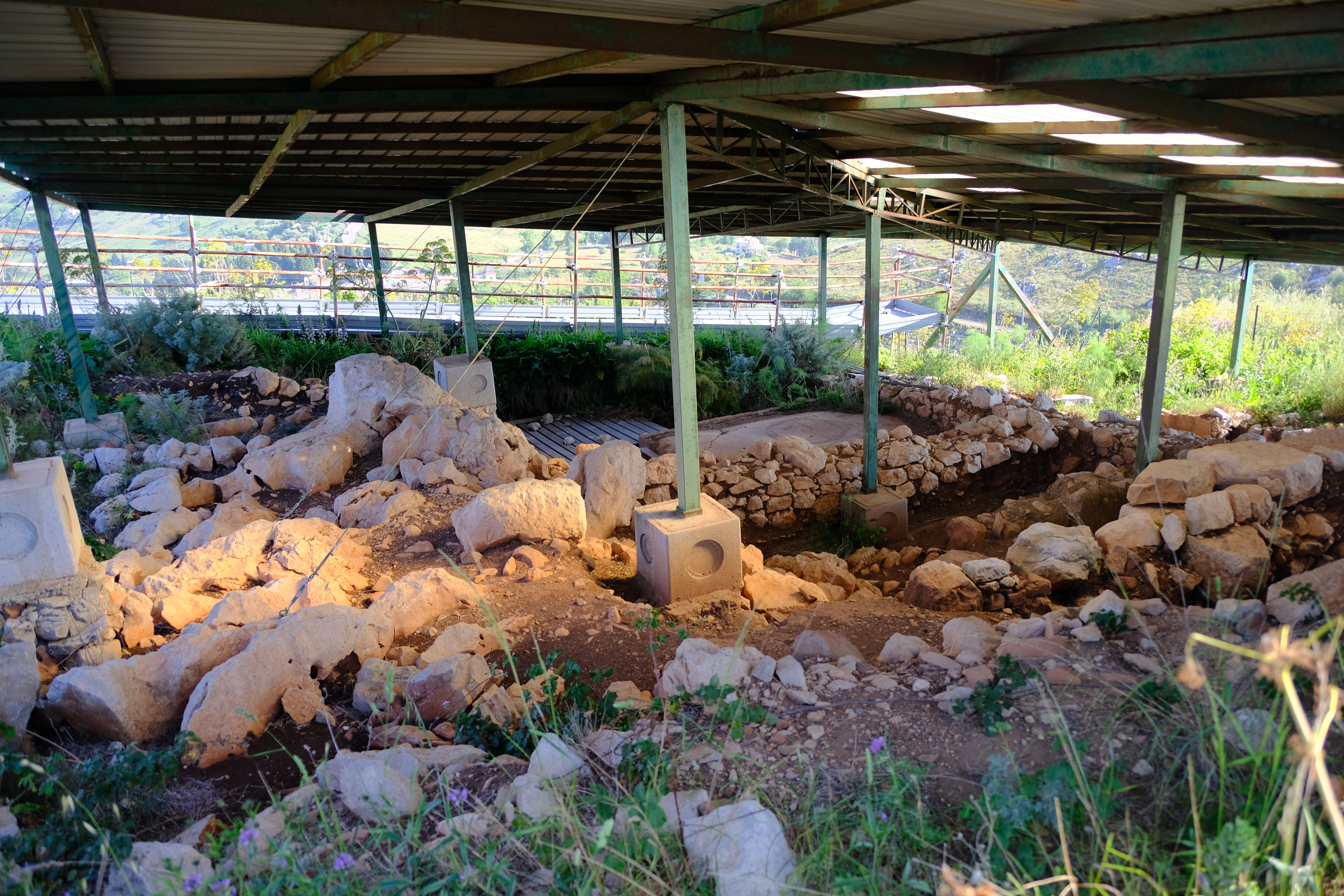
Excavations at Apollonia

Apollonia (Greek: Ἀπολλωνία) was an ancient city of Magna Graecia in Sicily, which, according to Stephanus of Byzantium, was situated in the neighbourhood of Aluntium and Calacte.

The city was founded by Dionysius I of Syracuse as an outpost against the Carthaginians.

Cicero also mentions it in conjunction with Haluntium, Capitium, and Enguium, in a manner that seems to imply that it was situated in the same part of Sicily with these cities, and Diodorus states that it was at one time subject to Leptines the tyrant of Enguium from whose hands it was wrested by Timoleon in 342 BC and restored to independency.

A little later we find it again mentioned among the cities reduced by Agathocles after his return from Africa in 307 BC. But it evidently regained its liberty after the fall of the tyrant, and in the days of Cicero was still a municipal town of some importance. In the 1st c. BC it was civitas decumana subject to sending a tenth of its agricultural income to Rome, and it sent one ship to the fleet to counter pirates. At this time it also suffered from the predatory actions of Verres.

The city was later abandoned.

Its site had been much disputed but the passages above cited a point in the north-eastern part of Sicily and the remains have been located through excavations in 2003-5 on Monte Vecchio near San Fratello, rather than at the modern Pollina which was postulated.

The city walls of isodomic limestone masonry still exist on the south and west sides. Remains of at least two buildings also in isodomic, lie on the E side of the plateau. On the top of the hill is a large rock-cut cistern.

== See also ==
- List of ancient Greek cities
