= Resuttano =

- Comune
- Comune di Resuttano
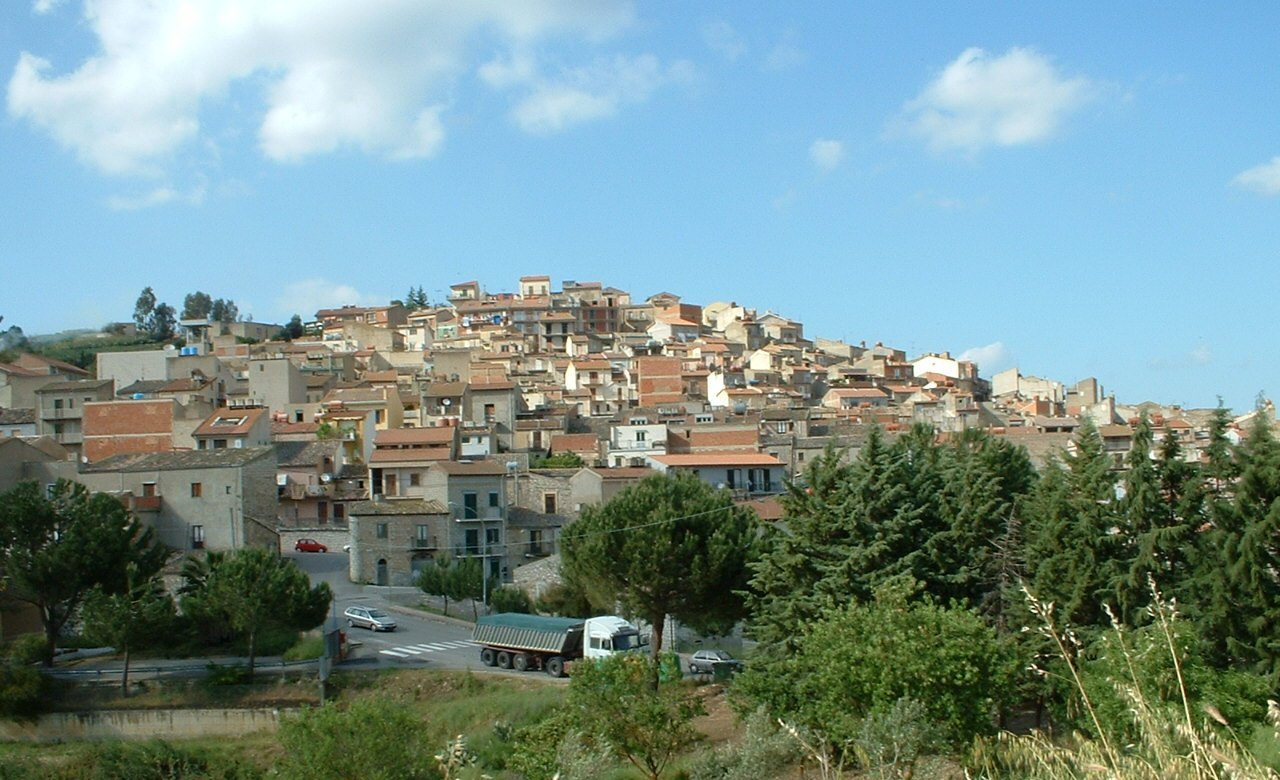

- Location within Italy Location within Sicily
- Coordinates: 37°41′N 14°2′E
- Country: Italy
- Region: Sicily
- Province: Province of Caltanissetta (CL)
- Frazioni: Ciolino, Largo Don Luigi Sturzo

Government
  - Mayor: Rosario Carapezza

Area
  - Total: 38.27 km^{2} (14.78 sq mi)
- Elevation: 600 m (2,000 ft)

Population (1-1-2021)
  - Total: 1,823
  - Density: 47.64/km^{2} (123.4/sq mi)
- Demonym: Resuttanese(i)
- Time zone: UTC+1 (CET)
  - Summer (DST): UTC+2 (CEST)
- Postal code: 93010
- Dialing code: 0934
- Website: Official website

Resuttano (Sicilian: Rastanu) is a comune (municipality) in the Province of Caltanissetta in the Italian region of Sicily, located about 80 kilometres (50 mi) southeast of Palermo and about 20 kilometres (12 mi) north of Caltanissetta. As of 1 January 2021, it had a population of 1,823 and an area of 38.27 square kilometres (14.78 mi^{2}).

Resuttano borders the following municipalities: Alimena, Blufi, Bompietro, Petralia Sottana, Santa Caterina Villarmosa.

== History ==
In 1337 Federico II d'Aragona (1272–1337), king of Sicily, stopped at Resuttano Castle to dictate his will there and caused the War of the Four Vicars between the Chiaramonte faction and the Ventimiglia faction.

== Demographic evolution ==
Historical population

Year	Pop.	±%
1861	4,097	—
1871	4,215	+2.9%
1881	4,576	+8.6%
1901	5,069	+10.8%
1911	4,138	−18.4%

Year	Pop.	±%
1921	4,128	−0.2%
1931	4,633	+12.2%
1936	4,914	+6.1%
1951	5,245	+6.7%
1961	4,892	−6.7%

Year	Pop.	±%
1971	4,151	−15.1%
1981	3,219	−22.5%
1991	2,752	−14.5%
2001	2,467	−10.4%

Source: Data from ISTAT
