= Petralia Sottana =

- Comune
- Comune di Petralia Sottana
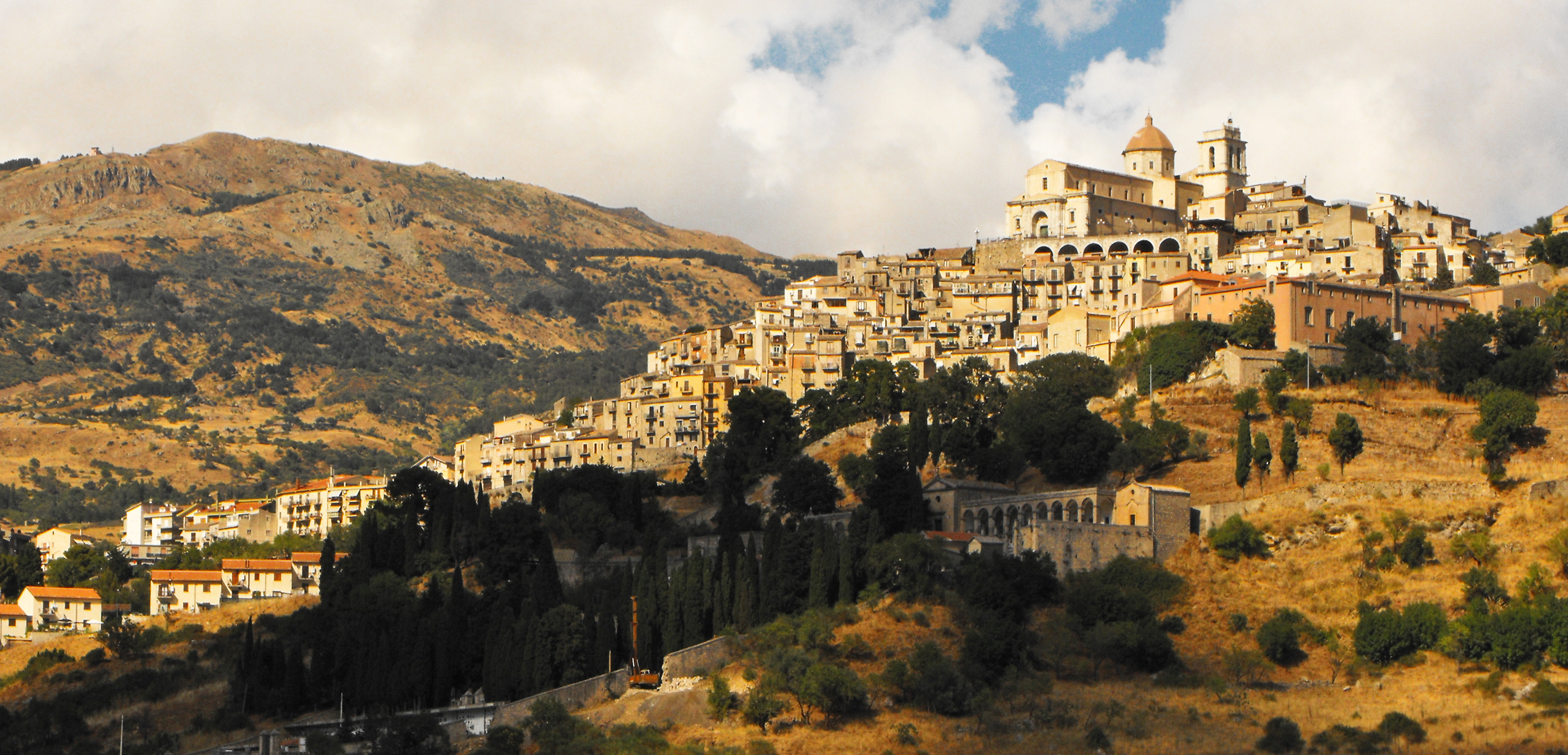

- Location within Italy Location within Sicily
- Coordinates: 37°48′N 14°5′E
- Country: Italy
- Region: Sicily
- Metropolitan city: Palermo (PA)
- Frazioni: Piano Battaglia, Landro, Tudia, Recattivo

Government
  - Mayor: Leonardo Iuri Neglia

Area
  - Total: 178.35 km^{2} (68.86 sq mi)
- Elevation: 1,039 m (3,409 ft)

Population (30 November 2016)
  - Total: 2,770
  - Density: 15.5/km^{2} (40.2/sq mi)
- Demonym: Petralesi
- Time zone: UTC+1 (CET)
  - Summer (DST): UTC+2 (CEST)
- Postal code: 90027
- Dialing code: 0921
- Patron saint: St. Calogerus
- Saint day: June 18
- Website: Official website

Petralia Sottana (Sicilian: Pitralìa Suttana) is a town and comune in the Metropolitan City of Palermo, in the island of Sicily, Southern Italy. The main characters in Emanuele Crialese's 2006 film of Sicilian immigration to America, Nuovomondo, come from the town of Petralia.

== History ==
The first traces of human settlement date back to the 4th/3rd millennium BC (Neolithic and Eneolithic periods) as evidenced by the archaeological finds in the nearby Grotta del Vecchiuzzo. In much closer times there must have been an indigenous settlement, strongly influenced by the nearby Greek colony of Imera, in whose excavations a bronze coin was found, the Petrinon which bears the name of the city of Petra. That Petra corresponds to modern Petralia is suggested by the name and proximity to Imera.

During the First Punic War the town expelled their Carthaginian garrison and surrendered to the Romans after the fall of Panormus to the Romans after which 10,000 inhabitants of Panormus were sold into slavery. In the 3rd century BC, with the Roman conquest, Petra became a "decumanus" city and a center of some importance as a military garrison and agricultural market, as evidenced by several writings of the time (among others Cicero in the "Verrine" and Diodorus Siculus) and by a few archaeological finds. The town then suffered the fate of the rest of the island, suffering the barbarian invasions first and the subsequent Byzantine reconquest.

== Geography ==
The Madonie Mountains cover the commune. Petralia Sottana hosts the headquarters of the Madonie Regional Natural Park, in which is included a significant amount of its municipal territory.

The commune is on the border between the Metropolitan City of Palermo and the Province of Caltanissetta. It is bounded by the communes of Alimena, Blufi, Caltanissetta, Castelbuono, Castellana Sicula, Geraci Siculo, Isnello, Marianopoli, Petralia Soprana, Polizzi Generosa, Resuttano, Santa Caterina Villarmosa, Villalba.

== Coat of arms ==
The coat of arms shows three lilies, referring to Lilium Petrae (Stone lily), a possible etymology of the town name.

== Main sights ==
- Maria Santissima Assunta (Chiesa Madre or Mother Church), known from the 9th century. Of the original building, only a portal in Gothic-Catalan style has survived. The current structure, with a nave and two aisles on the basilica plan, was built in 1633–1680. The sacristy houses a rare bronze lampstand dating back to the Arab conquest of Sicily, with an inscription in Kufic characters
- San Francesco d'Assisi: 17th century church
- Santissima Trinità: (1531) church formerly attached to abbey
- Palazzo del Giglio: current town hall
- Santa Maria alla Fontana
- Museo Civico Antonio Collisani: Civic museum with archeological and geological-paleontological collections
- Grotta del Vecchiuzzo, a prehistoric cave where archeological finds dating back to the Late Neolithic were discovered
- Sanctuary of the Madonna dell'Alto

== People ==
- Luciano Chiara, mathematician
- Giuseppe Colosi, zoologist
- Antonio Pucci, racing driver
- Cesare Terranova, judge and politician killed by the Mafia
