= Fanaco Lake =

Artificial lake in Sicily, Italy

Lago Fanaco
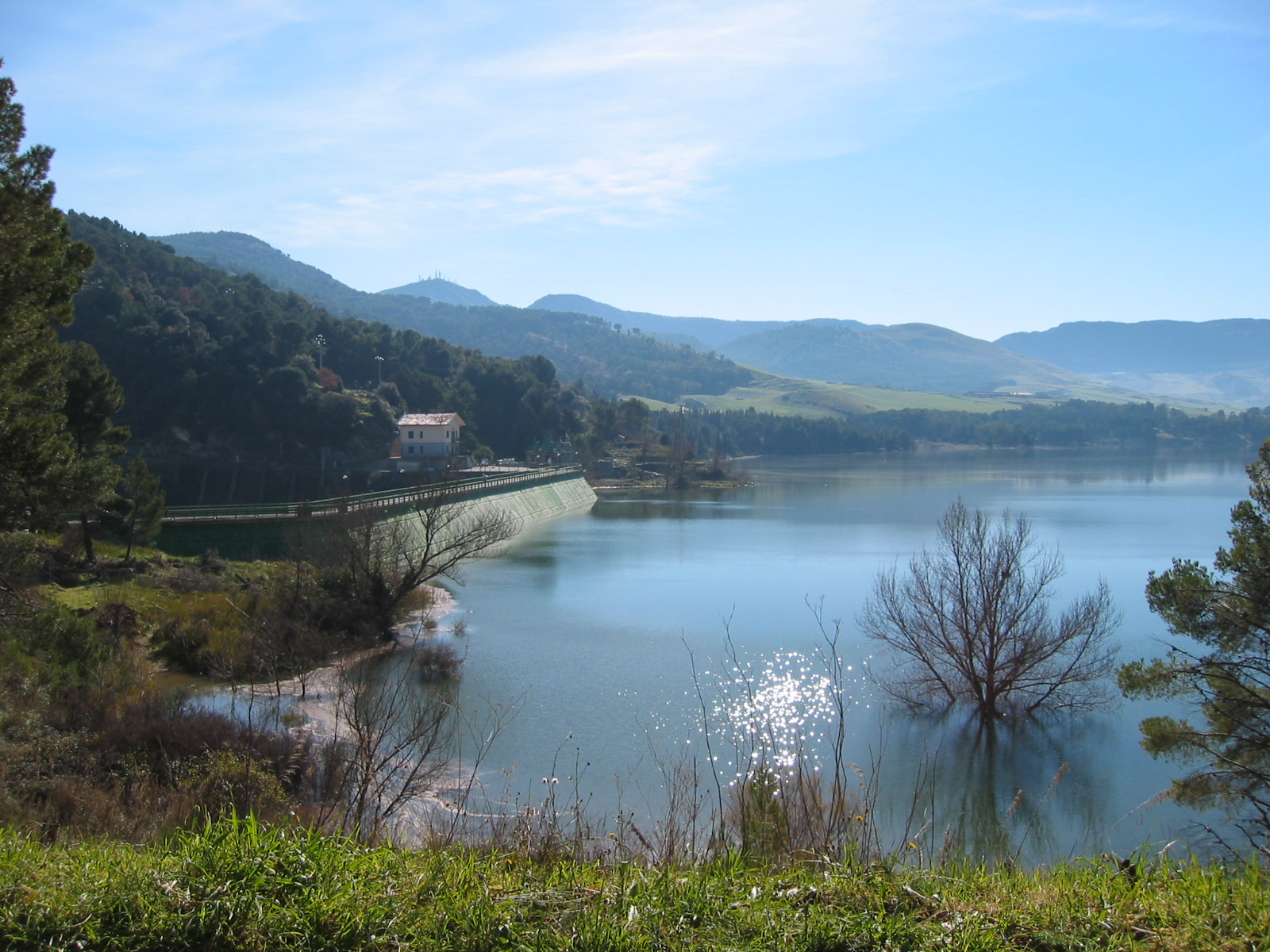

- Location within Sicily
- Location: Province of Palermo, Sicily
- Coordinates: 37.664663°N 13.551722°E
- Basin countries: Italy
- Surface area: 1.38 km^{2} (0.53 sq mi)
- Surface elevation: 680 m (2,230 ft)

Lago Fanaco is an artificial lake and reservoir in the Province of Palermo, Sicily, Italy, near the municipality of Castronovo di Sicilia. At an elevation of 680 m, its surface area is 1.38 km^{2}. The lake is 3.5 km long and 1 km wide at its widest point and can accommodate 20.7 million cubic meters at the maximum flooded height.

As a result of a severe drought in Sicily, Lake Fanaco dried up completely on 15 July 2024.

== Wildlife ==
Today Fanaco is a destination for many species of migratory birds, especially lapwings, royal seagulls, ducks, herons and little grebes. In the hills above the lake flourish thick vegetation of holm oaks, poplars, pines, cypresses and ash trees, gorse and euphorbia.
