= Marianopoli =

Marianopoli Marianúpolis (Greek)
- Comune
- Comune di Marianopoli
- Location within Italy Location within Sicily
- Coordinates: 37°36′N 13°55′E
- Country: Italy
- Region: Sicily
- Province: Caltanissetta (CL)

Government
  - Mayor: Salvatore Noto

Area
  - Total: 13.0 km^{2} (5.0 sq mi)
- Elevation: 720 m (2,360 ft)

Population (30 November 2011)
  - Total: 1,990
  - Density: 153/km^{2} (396/sq mi)
- Demonym: Marianopolesi or Manchesi
- Time zone: UTC+1 (CET)
  - Summer (DST): UTC+2 (CEST)
- Postal code: 93010
- Dialing code: 0934
- Patron saint: St. Prosperus
- Saint day: First Sunday in August
- Website: Official website

Marianopoli (Sicilian: Manchi) is a comune (municipality) in the Province of Caltanissetta in the Italian region Sicily, located about 80 kilometres (50 miles) southeast of Palermo and about 20 kilometres (12 miles) northwest of Caltanissetta.

Marianopoli borders the following municipalities: Caltanissetta, Mussomeli, Petralia Sottana, Villalba.

== Twin towns ==
- Catenanuova, Italy
