= Roccapalumba =

- Comune
- Comune di Roccapalumba
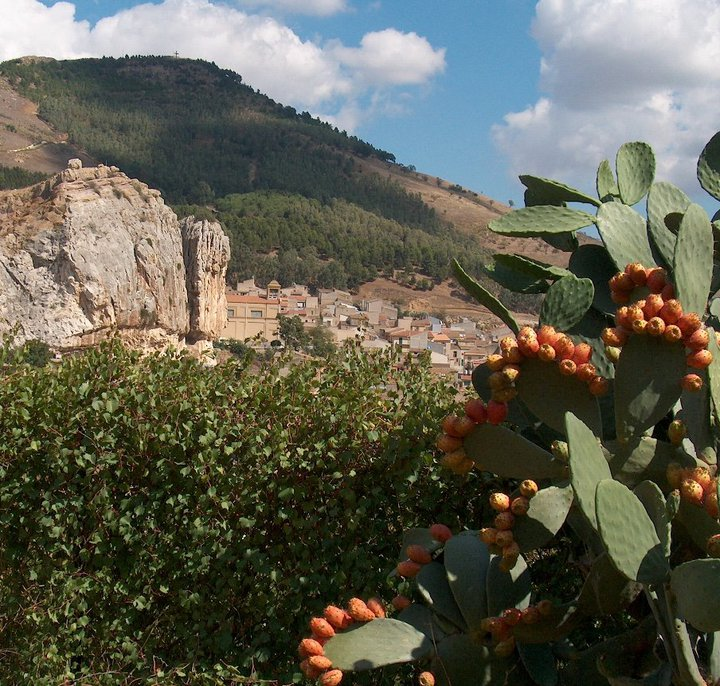

- Coat of arms

- Location within Italy Location within Sicily
- Coordinates: 37°48′N 13°38′E
- Country: Italy
- Region: Sicily
- Metropolitan city: Palermo (PA)
- Frazioni: Regalgioffoli

Government
  - Mayor: Giovanni Giordano

Area
  - Total: 31.4 km^{2} (12.1 sq mi)
- Elevation: 540 m (1,770 ft)

Population (31 December 2010)
  - Total: 2,680
  - Density: 85.4/km^{2} (221/sq mi)
- Demonym: Roccapalumbesi
- Time zone: UTC+1 (CET)
  - Summer (DST): UTC+2 (CEST)
- Postal code: 90020
- Dialing code: 091
- Website: Official website

Roccapalumba (Sicilian: Roccapalumma) is a comune (municipality) in the Metropolitan City of Palermo in the Italian region Sicily, located about 60 kilometres (37 mi) southeast of Palermo.

Roccapalumba is located 64 km (40 mi) southeast of Palermo and borders the following municipalities: Alia, Caccamo, Castronovo di Sicilia, Lercara Friddi, and Vicari.

== History ==
The name of Roccapalumba means "Cliff of doves", perhaps for the height of the place where the small town rises. The original agricultural colony was founded about the year 1640 on the feud of Palumba by the princes Ansalone. The Parish Church was built in the 17th century and completely rebuilt after an earthquake in 1823.

In 1714, the Prince of Larderia, Don Francesco Moncada, acquired and held the feud until the territory was made official as an inhabited centre (town). During the 18th century the feudal village under the Larderia family had a period of particular growth, both agricultural and territorial.

Among its monuments there are the Cathedral Church of the XVIII in late baroque style and the Santuario della Madonna della Luce (Sanctuary of Our Lady of Light).
