= Pollina =

- Comune
- Comune di Pollina
- Location within Italy Location within Sicily
- Coordinates: 38°0′N 14°9′E
- Country: Italy
- Region: Sicily
- Metropolitan city: Palermo (PA)
- Frazioni: Finale

Area
  - Total: 49.9 km^{2} (19.3 sq mi)

Population (Dec. 2004)
  - Total: 3,102
  - Density: 62.2/km^{2} (161/sq mi)
- Demonym: Pollinesi
- Time zone: UTC+1 (CET)
  - Summer (DST): UTC+2 (CEST)
- Postal code: 90010
- Dialing code: 0921

Pollina (Sicilian: Puòddina) is a comune (municipality) in the Metropolitan City of Palermo in the Italian region Sicily, located about 70 kilometres (43 mi) east of Palermo. As of 31 December 2004, it had a population of 3,102 and an area of 49.9 square kilometres (19.3 mi^{2}). Pollina probably occupies the site of the ancient city of Apollonia.

The municipality of Pollina contains the frazione (subdivision) Finale .

Pollina borders the following municipalities: Castelbuono, Cefalù, San Mauro Castelverde.

== Demographic evolution ==
Historical population

Year	Pop.	±%
1861	1,434	—
1871	1,980	+38.1%
1881	2,204	+11.3%
1901	2,779	+26.1%
1911	2,893	+4.1%

Year	Pop.	±%
1921	2,956	+2.2%
1931	2,953	−0.1%
1936	3,030	+2.6%
1951	3,163	+4.4%
1961	3,148	−0.5%

Year	Pop.	±%
1971	3,134	−0.4%
1981	3,216	+2.6%
1991	3,157	−1.8%
2001	3,120	−1.2%

Source: Data from ISTAT
