= Geraci Siculo =

Geraci Siculo Geráki (Greek)
- Comune
- Comune di Geraci Siculo
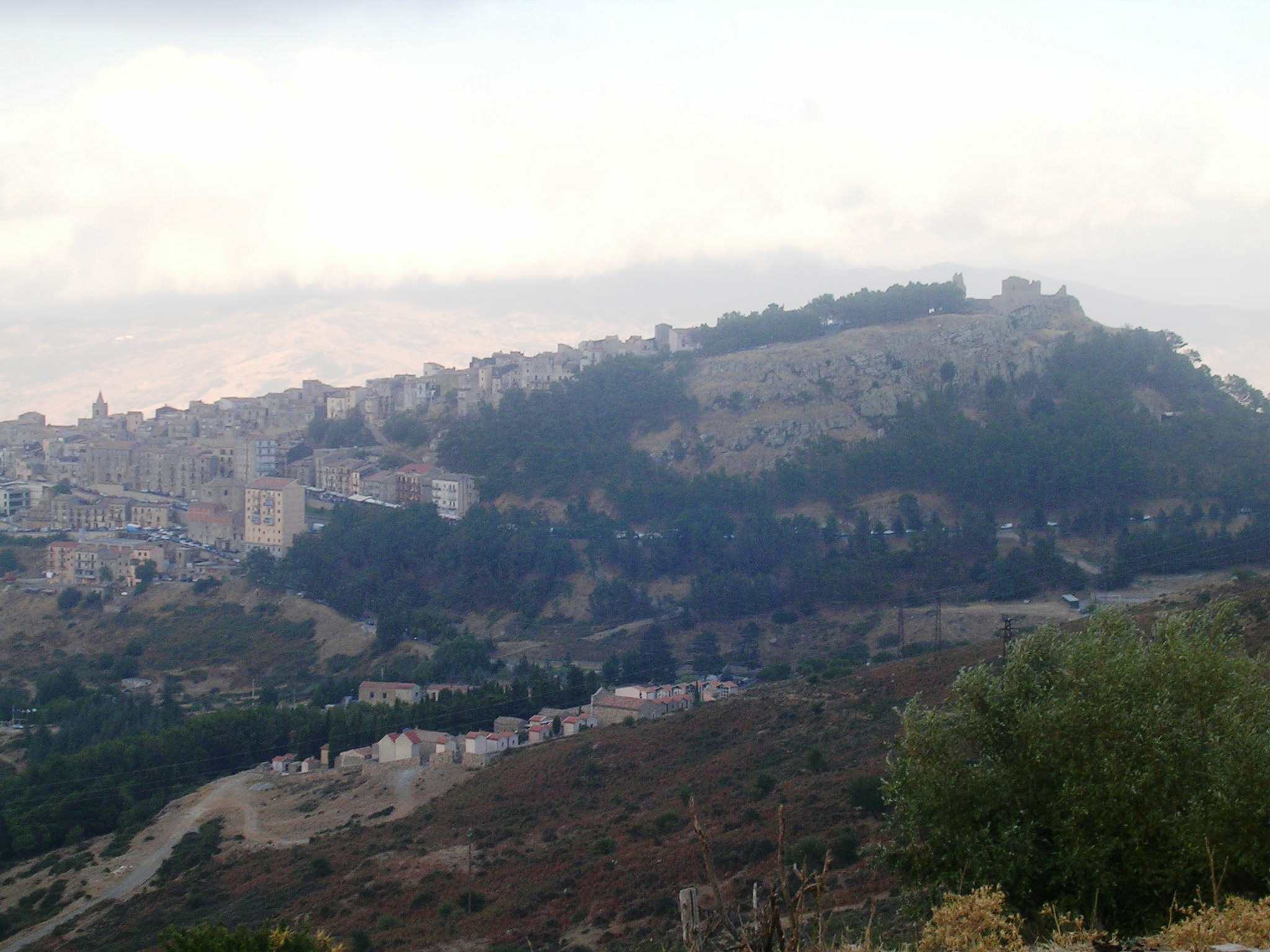

- Location within Italy Location within Sicily
- Coordinates: 37°52′N 14°9′E
- Country: Italy
- Region: Sicily
- Metropolitan city: Palermo (PA)

Government
  - Mayor: Bartolo Vienna

Area
  - Total: 113.2 km^{2} (43.7 sq mi)
- Elevation: 1,072 m (3,517 ft)

Population (30 November 2016)
  - Total: 1,873
  - Density: 16.55/km^{2} (42.85/sq mi)
- Demonym: Geracesi
- Time zone: UTC+1 (CET)
  - Summer (DST): UTC+2 (CEST)
- Postal code: 90010
- Dialing code: 0921
- Patron saint: St. Bartholomew
- Website: Official website

Geraci Siculo (Sicilian: Jiraci) is a comune (municipality) in the Metropolitan City of Palermo in the Italian region Sicily, located about 70 kilometres (43 mi) southeast of Palermo. It is one of I Borghi più belli d'Italia ("The most beautiful villages of Italy").

Geraci Siculo borders the following municipalities: Castel di Lucio, Castelbuono, Gangi, Nicosia, Petralia Soprana, Petralia Sottana, San Mauro Castelverde.
