= Godrano =

- Comune
- Comune di Godrano
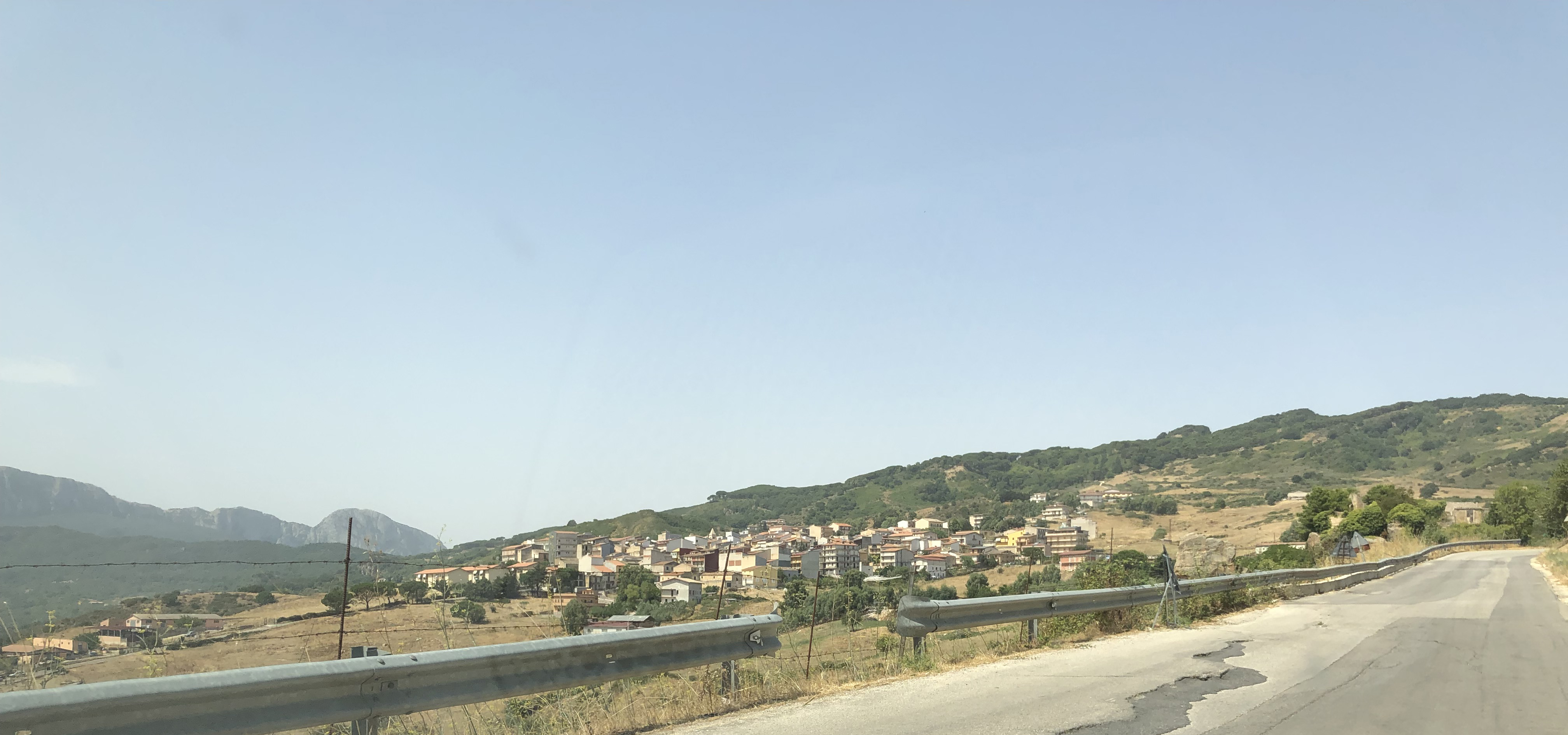

- Coat of arms

- Location within Italy Location within Sicily
- Coordinates: 37°54′N 13°26′E
- Country: Italy
- Region: Sicily
- Metropolitan city: Palermo (PA)

Government
  - Mayor: Matteo Cannella

Area
  - Total: 38.9 km^{2} (15.0 sq mi)
- Elevation: 693 m (2,274 ft)

Population (31 December 2010)
  - Total: 1,175
  - Density: 30.2/km^{2} (78.2/sq mi)
- Demonym: Godranesi
- Time zone: UTC+1 (CET)
  - Summer (DST): UTC+2 (CEST)
- Postal code: 90030
- Dialing code: 091

Godrano (Sicilian: Cutranu) is a comune (municipality) in the Metropolitan City of Palermo in the Italian region Sicily, located about 25 kilometres (16 mi) south of Palermo.

Godrano borders the following municipalities: Corleone, Marineo, Mezzojuso, Monreale. The Rocca Busambra, elevation 1,613 metres (5,292 ft), is within the communal territory.
