= Bompietro =

Bompietro Bompietru (Sicilian)
- Comune
- Comune di Bompietro
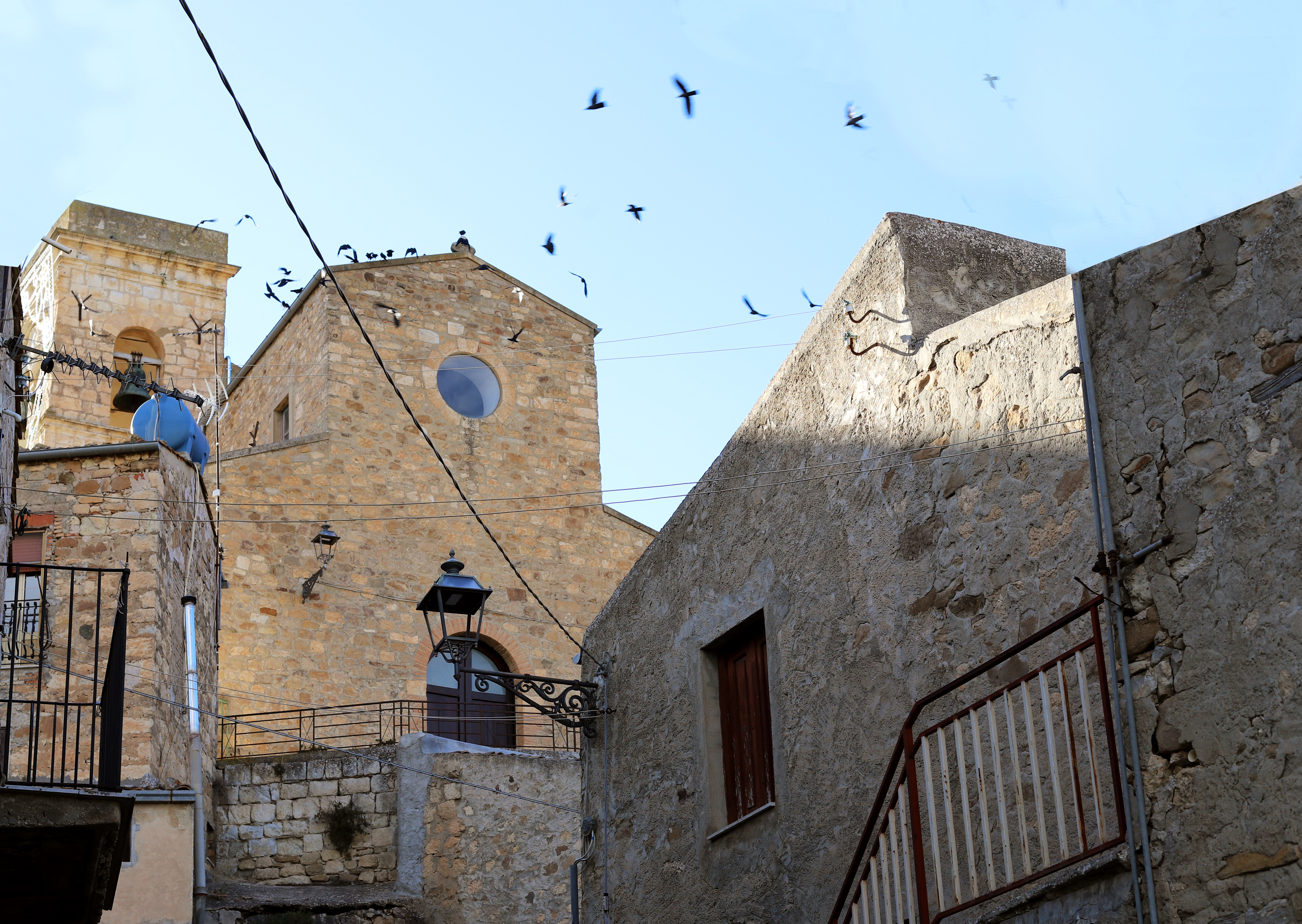
- "Chiesa Madre" church, Bompietro

- Location within Italy Location within Sicily
- Coordinates: 37°45′N 14°6′E
- Country: Italy
- Region: Sicily
- Metropolitan city: Palermo (PA)
- Frazioni: Locati, Chiarisi - Cicchettoni, Guarraia, Salerna

Government
  - Mayor: Lucio Di Gangi

Area
  - Total: 42.4 km^{2} (16.4 sq mi)
- Elevation: 685 m (2,247 ft)

Population (30 April 2017)
  - Total: 1,353
  - Density: 31.9/km^{2} (82.6/sq mi)
- Demonym: Bompietrini
- Time zone: UTC+1 (CET)
  - Summer (DST): UTC+2 (CEST)
- Postal code: 90020
- Dialing code: 0921
- Website: Official website

Bompietro (Sicilian: Bompietru) is a comune (municipality) in the Metropolitan City of Palermo in the Italian region Sicily, located about 80 kilometres (50 mi) southeast of Palermo.

Bompietro borders the following municipalities: Alimena, Blufi, Calascibetta, Gangi, Petralia Soprana, Resuttano, Villarosa.
