= Torretta =

- Comune
- Comune di Torretta
- Location within Italy Location within Sicily
- Coordinates: 38°8′N 13°14′E
- Country: Italy
- Region: Sicily
- Metropolitan city: Palermo (PA)

Area
  - Total: 25 km^{2} (9.7 sq mi)
- Elevation: 325 m (1,066 ft)

Population (2018-01-01)
  - Total: 3,881
  - Density: 160/km^{2} (400/sq mi)
- Demonym: Torrittesi
- Time zone: UTC+1 (CET)
  - Summer (DST): UTC+2 (CEST)
- Postal code: 90040
- Dialing code: 091
- Website: Official website

Torretta (Sicilian: Turretta) is a comune in the Metropolitan City of Palermo located on the Mediterranean island of Sicily.

This town is situated in a mountainous area overlooking Palermo.

Olive production is Torretta's primary agricultural product, and other industries include aluminum and marble. Monuments include the Santuario della Madonna delle Grazie of the XVII. Churches include the Chiesa del Sacramento, the Chiesa, and the Monastero del Collegio di Maria.

The town is named Torretta, probably due to the presence of a small tower around the latter half of the 17th century. The first inhabited center dates back to 1599 by Baron Arrigo Traina. Later, it came under the dominion of Giulio Tommaso Caro, prince of Pelagie (Lampedusa and Linosa). It was later ruled by the DiBenedetto family, who are renowned for the risings of 1860 for the Unity of Italy.

The population as of 2004 consists of 3,881 people.

Popular surnames in this town include: Candela, Caruso, Carollo, Gambino, DiMaggio, Intravaia, Mannino, Parlanti, Scalici, and Badalamenti.
