= Gangi, Sicily =

Gangi
- Comune
- Comune di Gangi
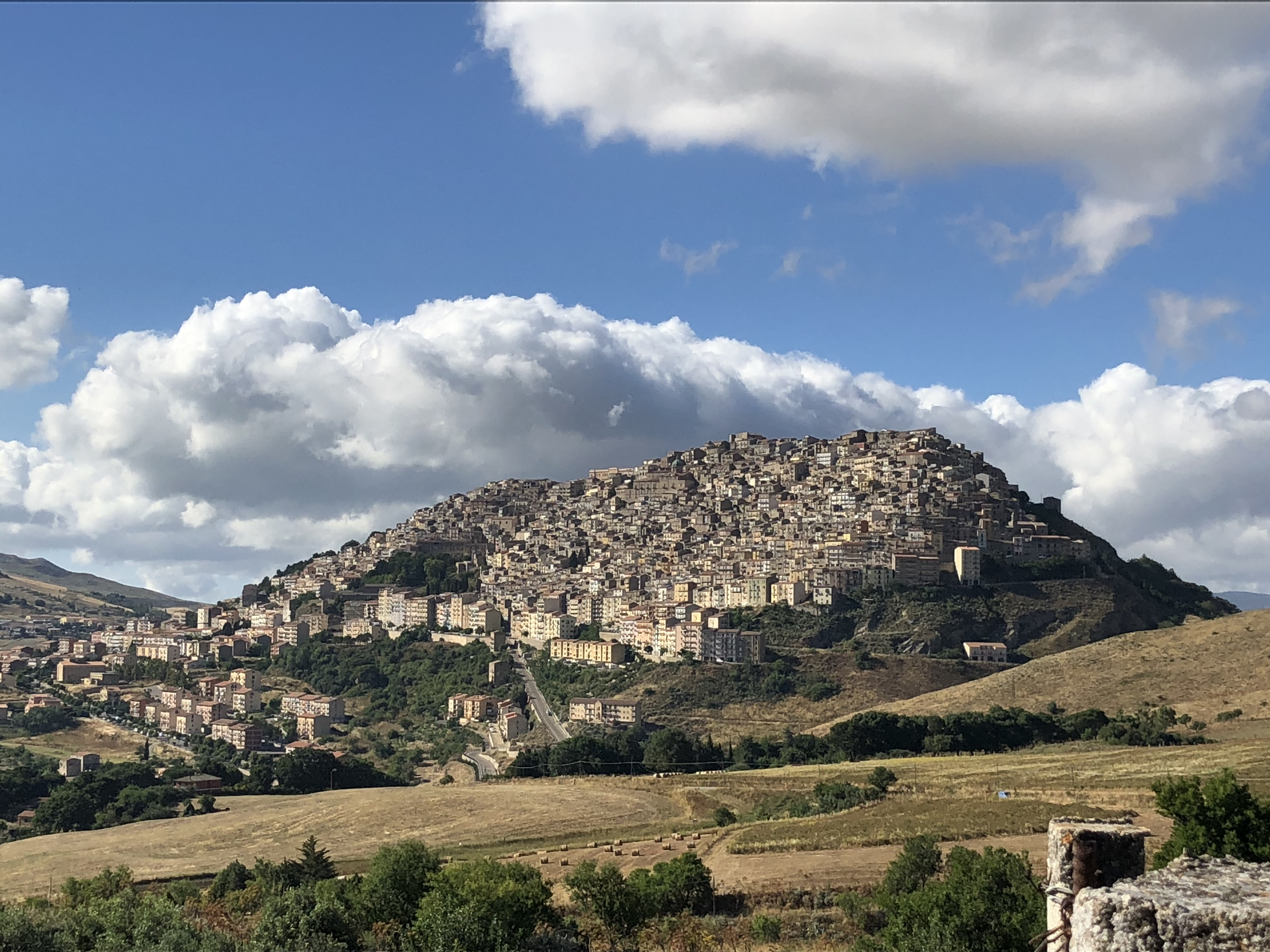

- Location within Italy Location within Sicily
- Coordinates: 37°47′50″N 14°12′21″E
- Country: Italy
- Region: Sicily
- Metropolitan city: Palermo (PA)

Government
  - Mayor: Gangi Valerio

Area
  - Total: 127.47 km^{2} (49.22 sq mi)
- Elevation: 1,011 m (3,317 ft)

Population (2026)
  - Total: 5,918
  - Density: 46.43/km^{2} (120.2/sq mi)
- Demonym: Gangitani
- Time zone: UTC+1 (CET)
  - Summer (DST): UTC+2 (CEST)
- Postal code: 90024
- Dialing code: 0921
- Patron saint: St. Catald Bishop
- Saint day: May 10
- Website: Official website

Gangi is a town and municipality (comune) in the Metropolitan City of Palermo in autonomous island region of Sicily in Italy, located about 80 kilometres (50 mi) southeast of Palermo. It is one of I Borghi più belli d'Italia ("The most beautiful villages of Italy"). It has 5,918 inhabitants.

Straddling the Madonie mountains of central Sicily, Gangi borders the municipalities of Alimena, Blufi, Bompietro, Calascibetta, Enna, Geraci Siculo, Nicosia, Petralia Soprana, and Sperlinga.

== History ==
Gangi's origins have been connected to the ancient Greek city of Engyon, or Herbita, but this theory remains unconfirmed. Traces of Roman presence are instead testified by archaeological excavations under the Abbey of Gangivecchio ("Old Gangi"). (But according to Glenn Storey, Francesca Spatafora and other archeologists and a consolidated historiography, Engio was near Gangi (today c. da Alburchia or c. da Gangivecchio, in Gangi's territory).

The current settlement dates to 1300, when it was rebuilt on the Monte Marone after its destruction in the course of the Sicilian Vespers war, as part of the county of Geraci. In 1625 it was acquired by the Graffeo family who, four years later, were made Princes of Gangi; in 1677 the title went to the Valguarnera. In the 18th century Gangi was a flourishing cultural centre, with several literary clubs and the construction of notable noble residences.

Later, after the unification of Italy, Gangi was the centre of fierce suppression of brigands who lived in the area. In 1926 it was the location of one of the hardest repression of the Mafia in Italy, carried out by the local prefect Cesare Mori.

In 2014, the local administration under a dynamic mayor began disposing of abandoned houses with some being given away and others being sold for a nominal price. The recipients had to agree to spend at least 35,000 euros on restoration within five years. The giveaway is a means to stimulate tourism-related activities and diversify the local economy, which was primarily dependent on agriculture and animal husbandry. The scheme has proved a great success.

Gangi and Di Gangi are also common Sicilian surnames.

== Demographics ==
As of 2026, the population is 5,918, of which 48% are male, and 52% are female. Minors make up 12.2% of the population, and seniors make up 31.1%.

Historical population

| Year | Pop. | ±% |
|---|---|---|
| 1861 | 10,695 | — |
| 1871 | 13,126 | +22.7% |
| 1881 | 12,058 | −8.1% |
| 1901 | 11,551 | −4.2% |
| 1911 | 10,835 | −6.2% |
| 1921 | 15,753 | +45.4% |
| 1931 | 10,323 | −34.5% |
| 1936 | 11,022 | +6.8% |

| Year | Pop. | ±% |
|---|---|---|
| 1951 | 11,015 | −0.1% |
| 1961 | 11,051 | +0.3% |
| 1971 | 10,072 | −8.9% |
| 1981 | 8,555 | −15.1% |
| 1991 | 8,176 | −4.4% |
| 2001 | 7,614 | −6.9% |
| 2011 | 7,063 | −7.2% |
| 2021 | 6,179 | −12.5% |

Source: ISTAT

=== Immigration ===
Foreign population by country of birth (2025)
| Country of birth | Population |
|---|---|
| Argentina | 90 |
| Germany | 56 |
| Romania | 32 |
| Morocco | 11 |
| Poland | 10 |
| Switzerland | 8 |
| Tunisia | 8 |
| Colombia | 6 |
| France | 5 |
| United States | 5 |
| Bangladesh | 4 |
| The Gambia | 4 |
| United Kingdom | 3 |
| Algeria | 2 |
| Belarus | 2 |

As of 2025, of the known countries of birth of 5,983 residents, the most numerous are: Italy (5,742 – 96%), Argentina (90 – 1.5%), Germany (56 – 0.9%).

== Main sights ==
- The castle, on the highest part of Mount Marone, built probably in the 14th century. It was the seat of the county lords.
- Palazzo Sgadari and Palazzo Bongiorno, two notable noble residences
- Mother church of San Nicolò di Bari (14th century). Today it is connected to the large Ventimiglia tower, which has been turned into a campanile. It houses a Final Judgement by Giuseppe Salerno, several statues by the local sculptor Filippo Quattrocchi, 18th-century frescoes in the SS. Sacrament oratory and a crypt with mummies of priests.
- Sanctuary of the Spirito Santo
- Abbey of Gangivecchio (1366)
- The notable Romanesque church of San Giuseppe dei Ricchi (also known as San Paolo)
- Late Baroque Chiesa della Badia
- Parish church of Santa Maria del Gesù, with a Romanesque campanile. It houses the precious sculptures of Madonna with Child and Annunciation by Quattrocchi.
- The Museum of Death, the Crypt of the Mummies of Gangi. The Museum features the Crypt of the Priests ("A Fossa di Parrini"), located in the basement of the San Nicolo church, where on display are one hundred standing mummified bodies of clergymen with their death masks in individual niches. The Dutch artist, M.C. Escher, who lived for many years in Italy, after visiting the crypts in 1932, drew an artwork depicting these mummies entitled "Mummified Priests in Gangi, Sicily"; lithographs of this work exist today.

== Gallery ==
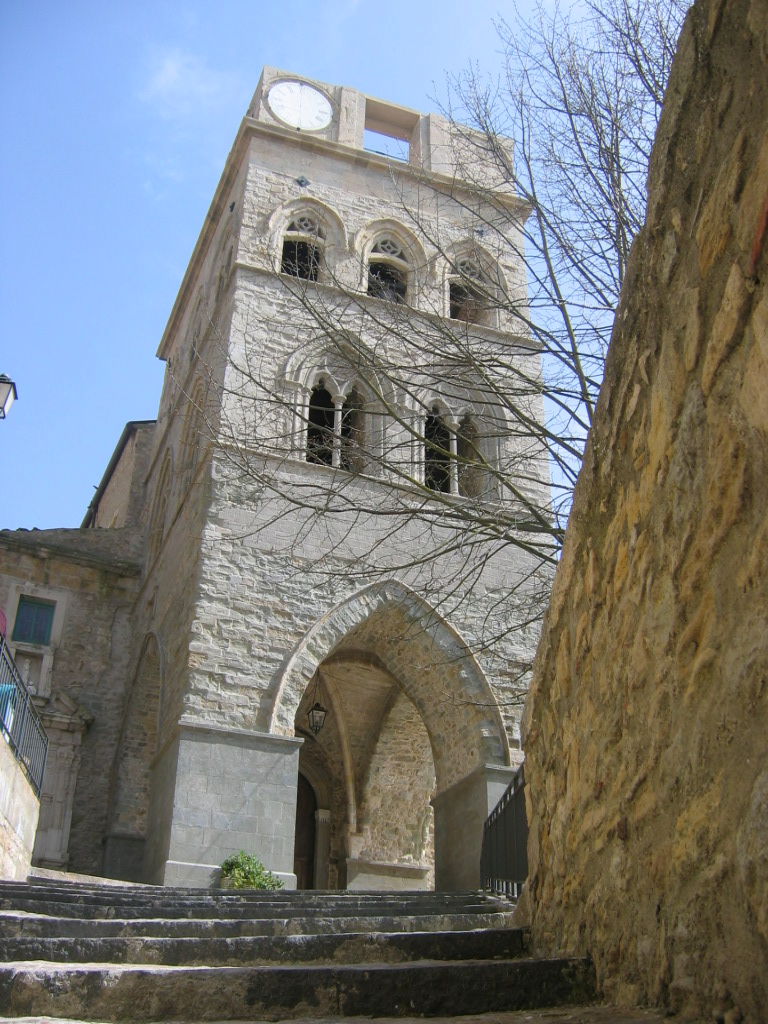
Civic Tower of Ventimiglia Tower

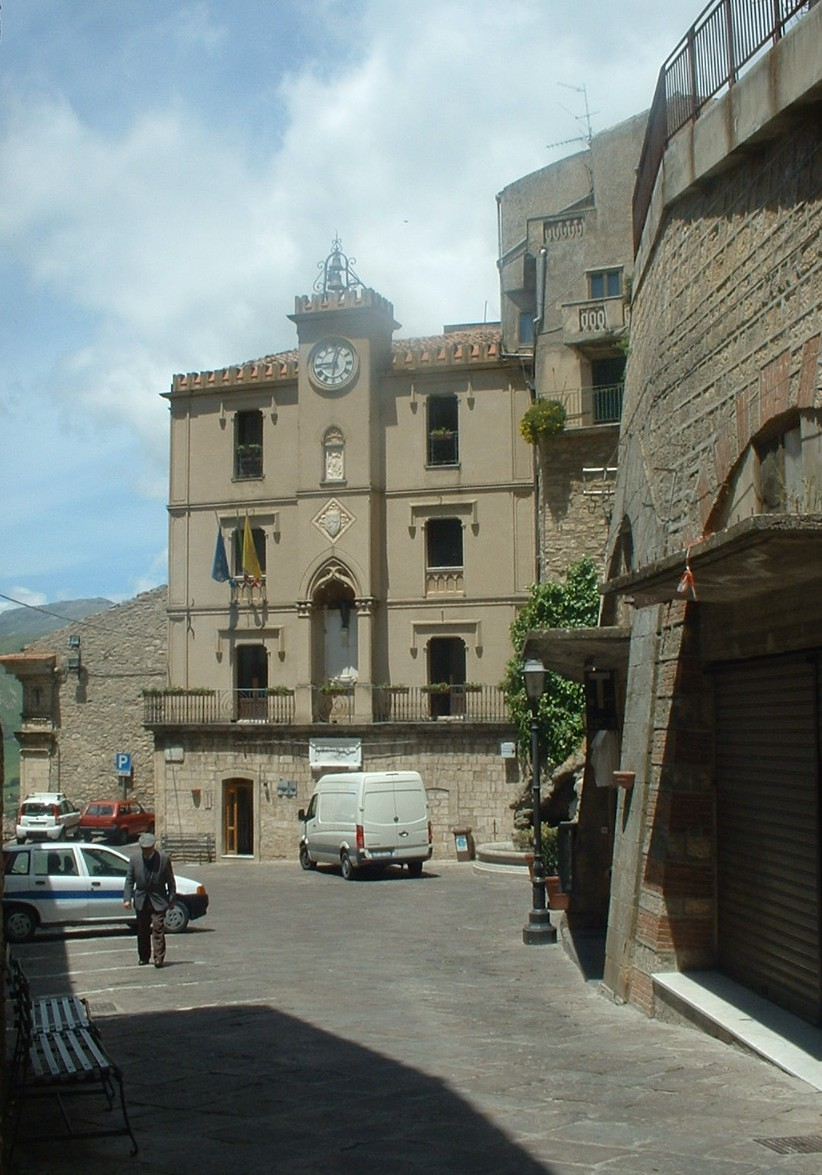
Piazza del Popolo and Town Hall

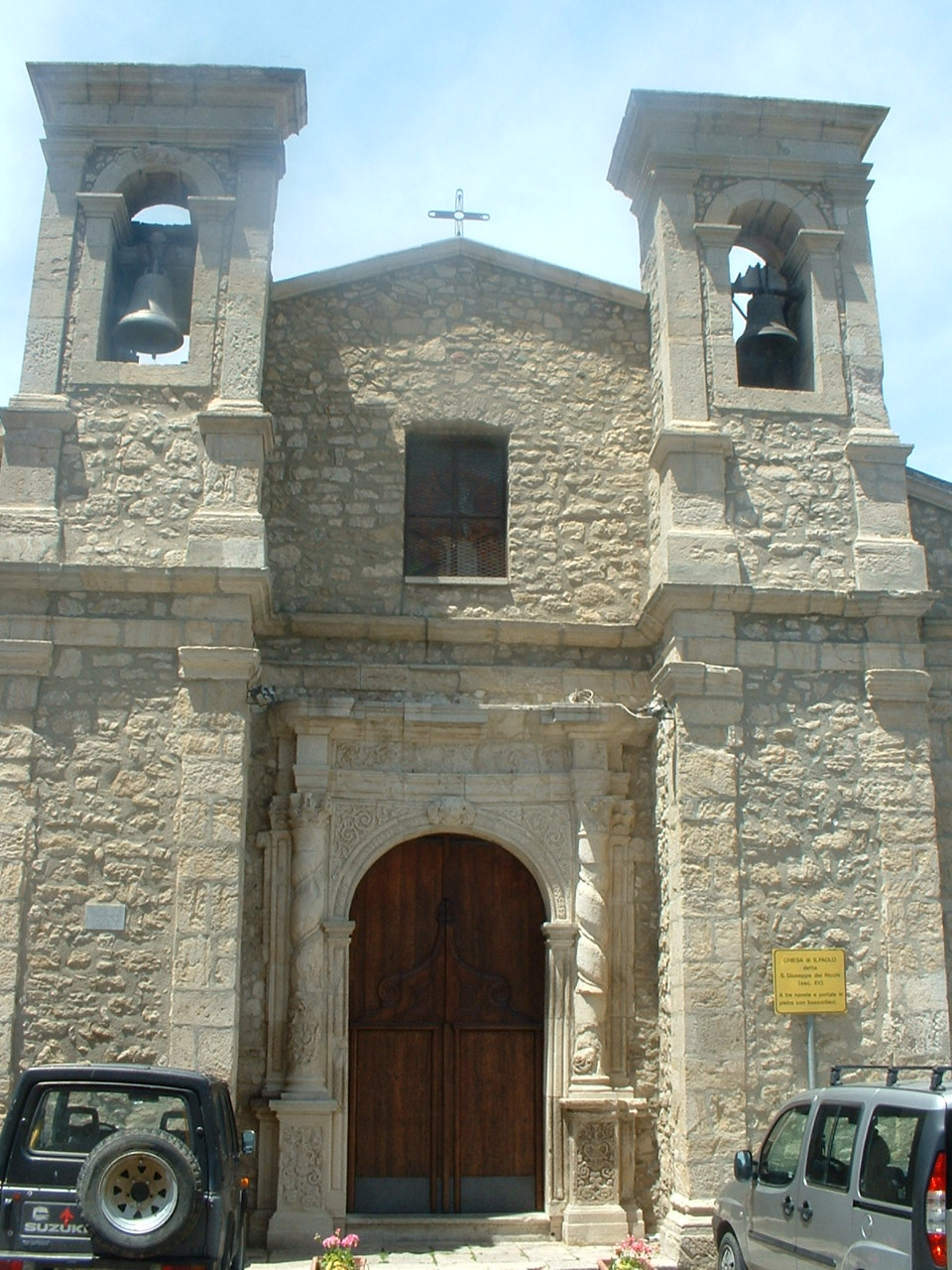
Church of San Paolo

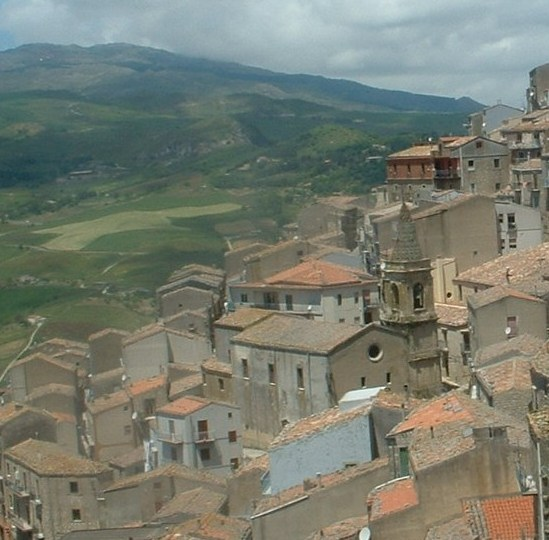
The lower town, with the church of SS. Salvatore
