= Metropolitan City of Palermo =

Metropolitan City of Palermo Città metropolitana di Palermo (Italian) città metropolitana I paliammu (Sicilian)
- Metropolitan City
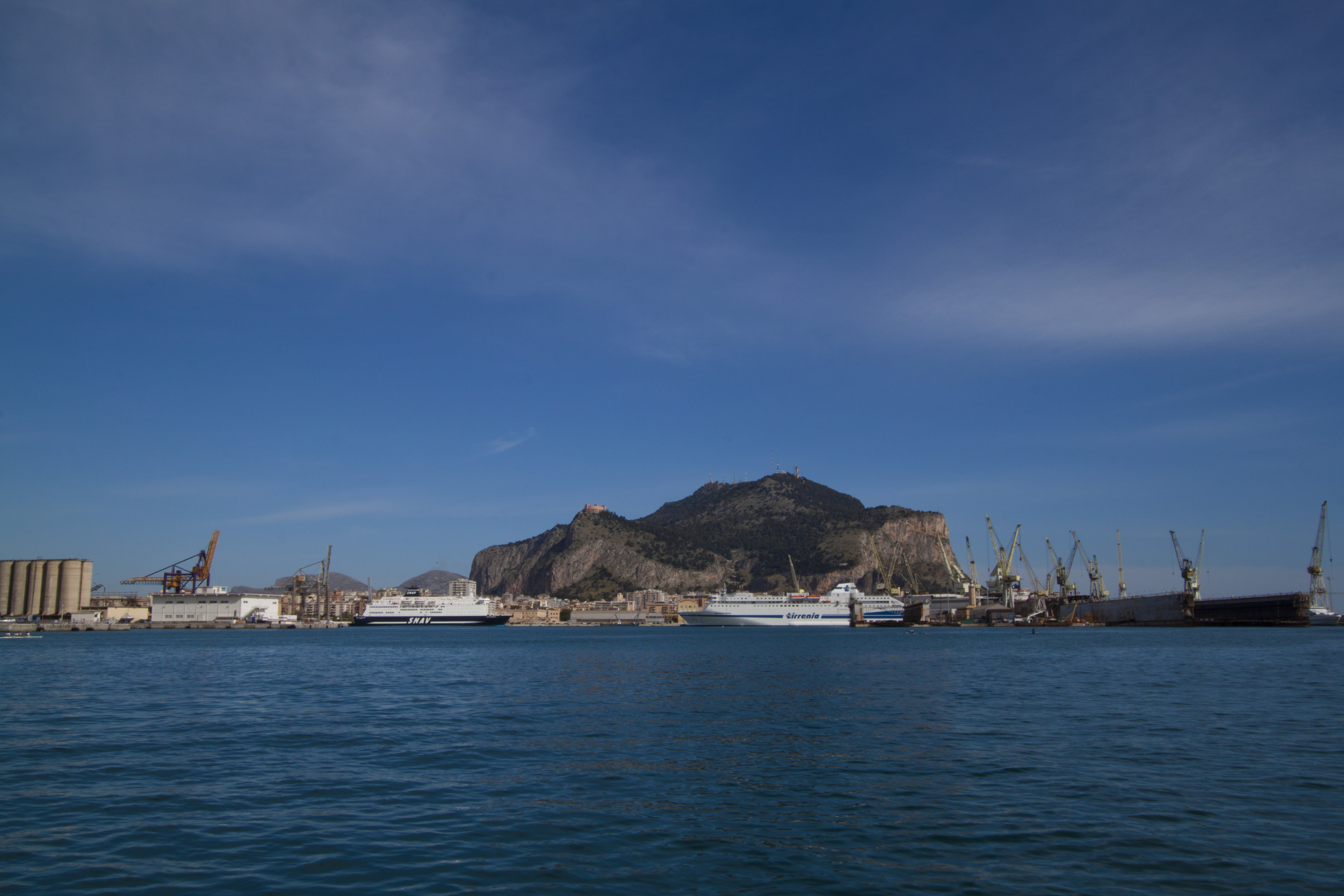

- Flag Coat of arms

- Location of the Metropolitan City of Palermo in Italy
- Country: Italy
- Region: Sicily
- Established: 4 August 2015
- Capital: Palermo
- Municipalities: 82

Government
  - Metropolitan mayor: Roberto Lagalla

Area
  - Total: 5,009.28 km^{2} (1,934.09 sq mi)

Population (2026)
  - Total: 1,195,307
  - Density: 238.619/km^{2} (618.019/sq mi)

GDP
  - Metro: €23.223 billion (2015)
  - Per capita: €18,229 (2015)
- Time zone: UTC+1 (CET)
  - Summer (DST): UTC+2 (CEST)
- Postal code: 90121-90151 (Palermo); 90010-90051 (other municipalities)
- Telephone prefix: 091, 0921, 0924
- ISO 3166 code: IT-PA
- Vehicle registration: PA
- ISTAT code: 282
- Website: Official website

The Metropolitan City of Palermo (Italian: città metropolitana di Palermo; Sicilian: citati metrupulitana di Palermu) is a metropolitan city in the autonomous island region of Sicily in Italy. Its capital is the city of Palermo.

It replaced the province of Palermo and comprises the city of Palermo and 82 other municipalities.

With a population of 1,195,307, it is the 6th-largest metropolitan city in Italy.

== History ==
It was first created by the reform of local authorities (Law 142/1990) and then established by regional law on 15 August 2015.

== Geography ==
The Metropolitan City faces the Tyrrhenian Sea on the north, while on the west it is bordered by the province of Trapani, on the south by the province of Agrigento and by that of Caltanissetta, to the east by the Metropolitan City of Messina and the province of Enna.

The island of Ustica is also included in the metropolitan territory.

== Government ==
=== List of metropolitan mayors ===
	Metropolitan Mayor	Term start	Term end	Party
1	Leoluca Orlando	7 June 2016	20 June 2022	PD
2	Roberto Lagalla	20 June 2022	incumbent	UDC

=== Municipalities ===
The Metropolitan City includes 82 municipalities:

- Alia
- Alimena
- Aliminusa
- Altavilla Milicia
- Altofonte
- Bagheria
- Balestrate
- Baucina
- Belmonte Mezzagno
- Blufi
- Bisacquino
- Bolognetta
- Bompietro
- Borgetto
- Caccamo
- Caltavuturo
- Campofelice Di Fitalia
- Campofelice Di Roccella
- Campofiorito
- Camporeale
- Capaci
- Carini
- Castelbuono
- Casteldaccia
- Castellana Sicula
- Castronovo di Sicilia
- Cefalà Diana
- Cefalù
- Cerda
- Chiusa Sclafani
- Ciminna
- Cinisi
- Collesano
- Contessa Entellina
- Corleone
- Ficarazzi
- Gangi
- Geraci Siculo
- Giardinello
- Giuliana
- Godrano
- Gratteri
- Isnello
- Isola delle Femmine
- Lascari
- Lercara Friddi
- Marineo
- Mezzojuso
- Misilmeri
- Monreale
- Montelepre
- Montemaggiore Belsito
- Palazzo Adriano
- Palermo
- Partinico
- Petralia Soprana
- Petralia Sottana
- Piana degli Albanesi
- Polizzi Generosa
- Pollina
- Prizzi
- Roccamena
- Roccapalumba
- San Cipirello
- San Giuseppe Jato
- San Mauro Castelverde
- Santa Cristina Gela
- Santa Flavia
- Sciara
- Scillato
- Sclafani Bagni
- Termini Imerese
- Terrasini
- Torretta
- Trabia
- Trappeto
- Ustica
- Valledolmo
- Ventimiglia di Sicilia
- Vicari
- Villabate
- Villafrati

== Demographics ==
As of 2026, the population is 1,195,307, of which 48.5% are male, and 51.5% are female. Minors make up 16.3% of the population, and seniors make up 23.8%.

Historical population

Year	Pop.	±%
1861	591,990	—
1871	624,628	+5.5%
1881	703,460	+12.6%
1901	801,746	+14.0%
1911	825,140	+2.9%
1921	904,171	+9.6%
1931	843,549	−6.7%
1936	896,848	+6.3%

Year	Pop.	±%
1951	1,028,431	+14.7%
1961	1,111,397	+8.1%
1971	1,124,015	+1.1%
1981	1,198,575	+6.6%
1991	1,224,778	+2.2%
2001	1,235,923	+0.9%
2011	1,243,585	+0.6%
2021	1,208,991	−2.8%

Source: ISTAT

=== Immigration ===
As of 2025, immigrants make up 4.6% of the population. The 5 largest foreign countries of birth are Bangladesh, Germany, Romania, the United States, and Tunisia.

== Transport ==
The Metropolitan City is served by three motorways, two of which start in Palermo: A19 to Catania and Termini Imerese; A20, departing from the former and leading to Messina; and A29, to Mazara del Vallo and Trapani.

Railroads include the Palermo-Messina and the Palermo-Catania.

There are two airports: Palermo–Boccadifalco and Palermo Punta Raisi.
