= Alimena =

- Comune
- Comune di Alimena
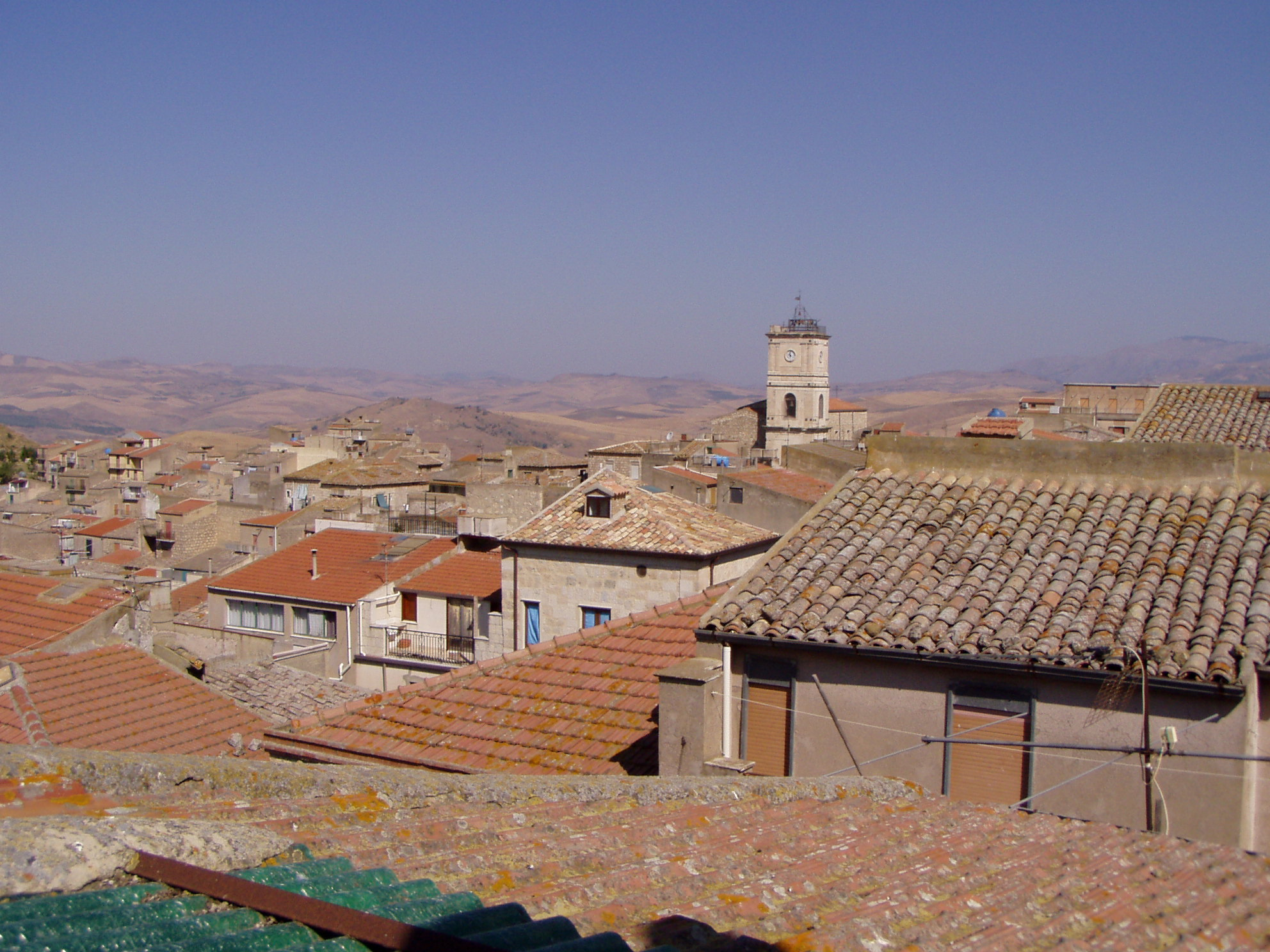

- Location of Alimena in Italy Alimena (Sicily)
- Coordinates: 37°42′N 14°7′E
- Country: Italy
- Region: Sicily
- Metropolitan city: Palermo (PA)

Government
  - Mayor: Giuseppe Scrivano

Area
  - Total: 59.7 km^{2} (23.1 sq mi)
- Elevation: 750 m (2,460 ft)

Population (30 April 2017)
  - Total: 1,968
  - Density: 33.0/km^{2} (85.4/sq mi)
- Demonym: Alimenesi
- Time zone: UTC+1 (CET)
  - Summer (DST): UTC+2 (CEST)
- Postal code: 90020
- Dialing code: 0921
- Patron saint: St. Mary Magdalene
- Saint day: 1 September
- Website: Official website

Alimena is a comune (municipality) in the Metropolitan City of Palermo in the Italian region of Sicily, located about 80 kilometres (50 mi) southeast of Palermo.

Alimena borders the following municipalities: Blufi, Bompietro, Gangi, Petralia Soprana, Petralia Sottana, Resuttano, Santa Caterina Villarmosa, Villarosa.
