= Vicari =

- Comune
- Comune di Vicari
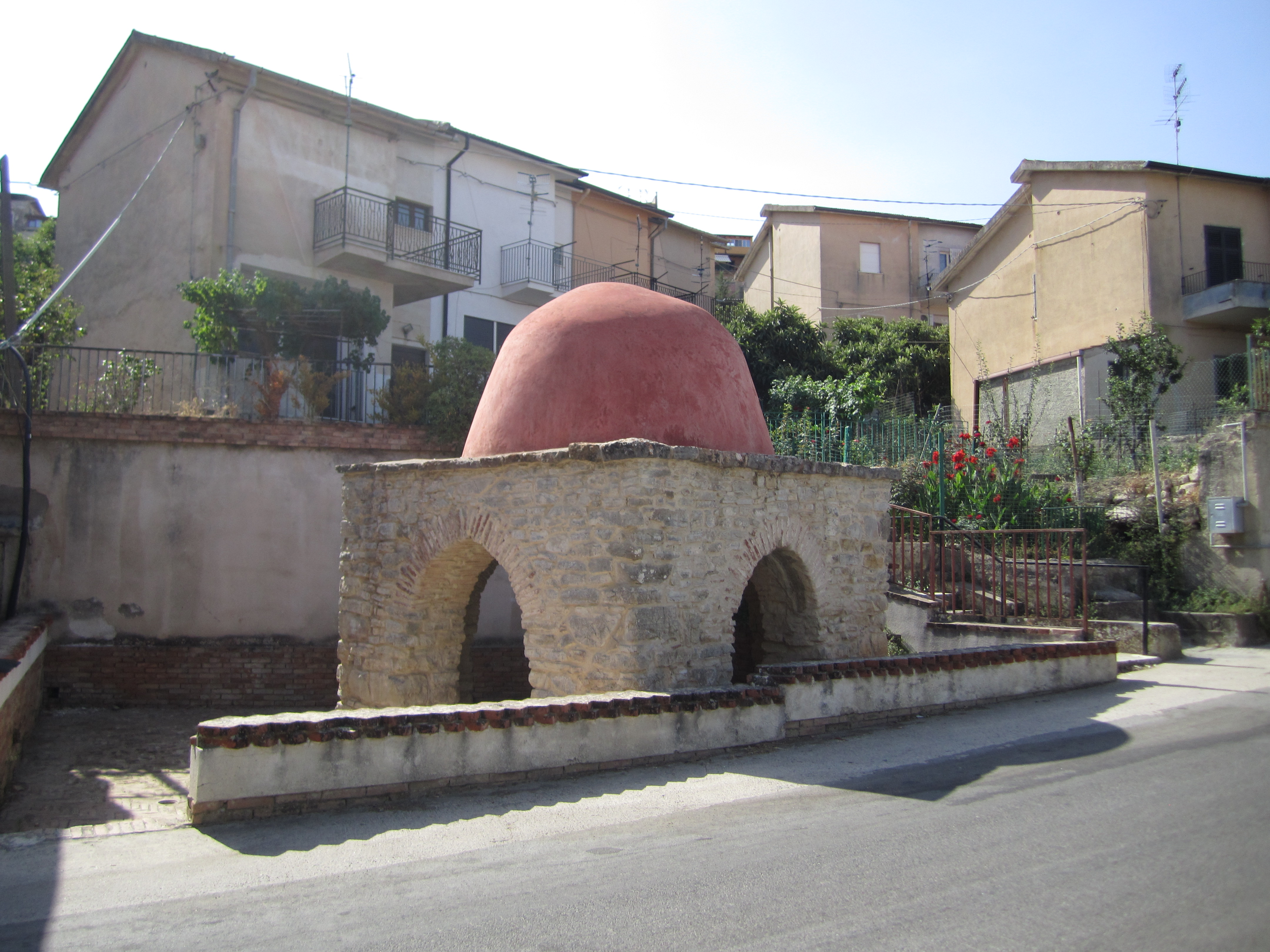
- The Arabic 'Cuba' in Vicari

- Location within Italy Location within Sicily
- Coordinates: 37°50′N 13°34′E
- Country: Italy
- Region: Sicily
- Metropolitan city: Palermo (PA)

Area
  - Total: 85.7 km^{2} (33.1 sq mi)

Population (Dec. 2004)
  - Total: 2,997
  - Density: 35.0/km^{2} (90.6/sq mi)
- Time zone: UTC+1 (CET)
  - Summer (DST): UTC+2 (CEST)
- Postal code: 90020
- Dialing code: 091

Vicari is a comune (municipality) in the Metropolitan City of Palermo in the Italian region Sicily, located about 35 kilometres (22 mi) southeast of Palermo. As of 31 December 2004, it had a population of 2,997 and an area of 85.7 square kilometres (33.1 mi^{2}).

Vicari borders the following municipalities: Caccamo, Campofelice di Fitalia, Ciminna, Lercara Friddi, Prizzi, Roccapalumba.

== Demographic evolution ==
Historical population

Year	Pop.	±%
1861	3,807	—
1871	4,463	+17.2%
1881	5,096	+14.2%
1901	4,628	−9.2%
1911	4,198	−9.3%

Year	Pop.	±%
1921	3,776	−10.1%
1931	4,145	+9.8%
1936	4,645	+12.1%
1951	5,400	+16.3%
1961	4,655	−13.8%

Year	Pop.	±%
1971	3,585	−23.0%
1981	3,377	−5.8%
1991	3,400	+0.7%
2001	3,077	−9.5%

Source: Data from ISTAT

== Notable people ==
- Giuseppe Attardi (1923–2008), molecular biologist, was born in Vicari
