= Camporeale =

- Comune
- Comune di Camporeale
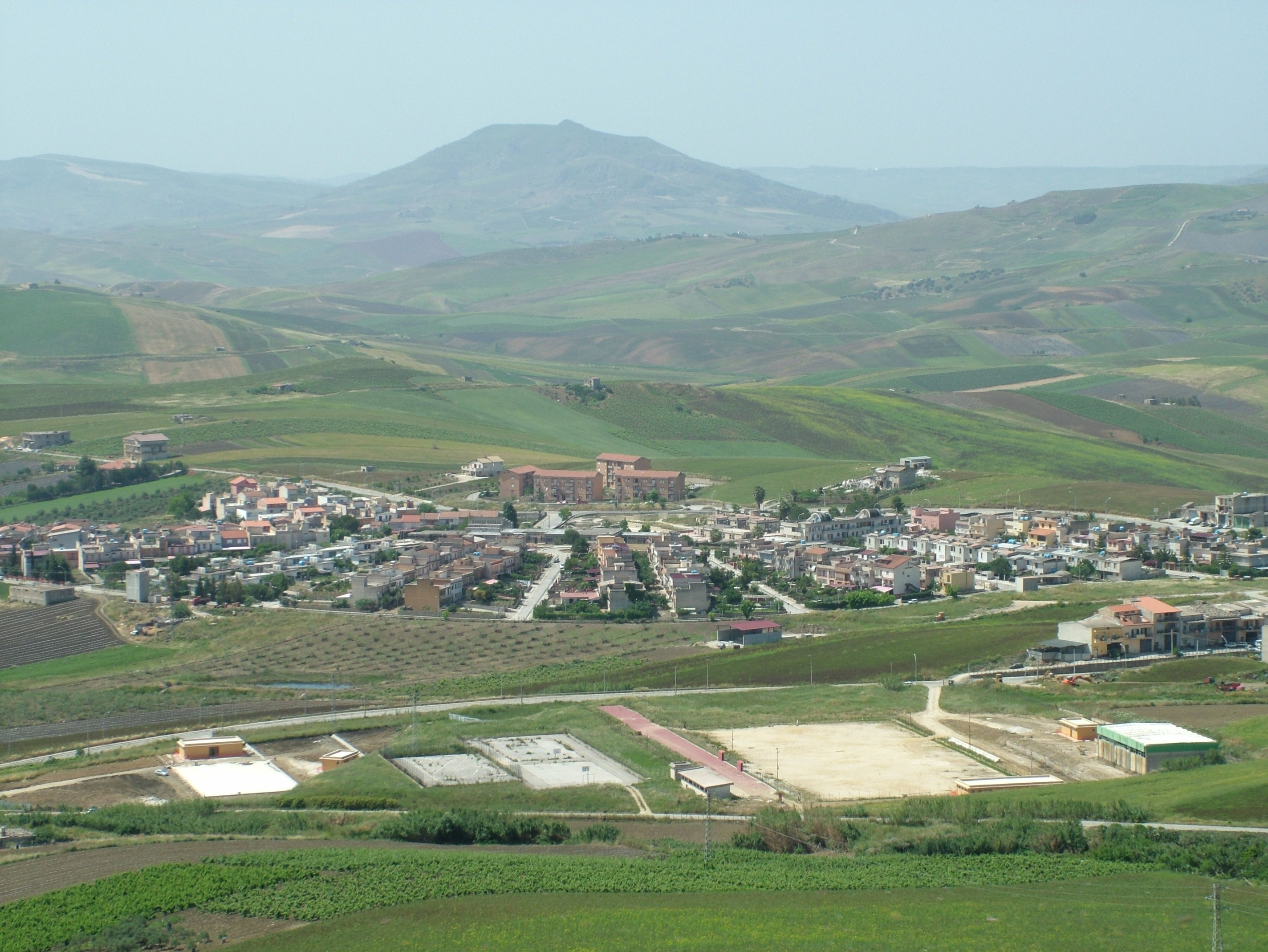

- Location within Italy Location within Sicily
- Coordinates: 37°54′N 13°6′E
- Country: Italy
- Region: Sicily
- Metropolitan city: Palermo (PA)

Area
  - Total: 38.6 km^{2} (14.9 sq mi)

Population (2023)
  - Total: 2,500
  - Density: 65/km^{2} (170/sq mi)
- Demonym: Camporealesi
- Time zone: UTC+1 (CET)
  - Summer (DST): UTC+2 (CEST)
- Postal code: 90043
- Dialing code: 0924
- Website: Official website

Camporeale (Sicilian: Campuriali) is a comune (municipality) in the Metropolitan City of Palermo in the Italian region Sicily, located about 35 kilometres (22 mi) southwest of Palermo. As of 2023, it has a population of 2.500 people and an area of 38.6 square kilometres (14.9 mi^{2}).

Camporeale borders the following municipalities: Alcamo, Monreale.

== Demographic evolution ==
Historical population

Year	Pop.	±%
1861	3,169	—
1871	3,907	+23.3%
1881	4,838	+23.8%
1901	5,595	+15.6%
1911	5,749	+2.8%

Year	Pop.	±%
1921	5,959	+3.7%
1931	6,130	+2.9%
1936	6,096	−0.6%
1951	6,730	+10.4%
1961	6,093	−9.5%

Year	Pop.	±%
1971	5,266	−13.6%
1981	5,126	−2.7%
1991	4,371	−14.7%
2001	3,716	−15.0%

Source: Data from ISTAT
