= Castellana Sicula =

- Comune
- Comune di Castellana Sicula
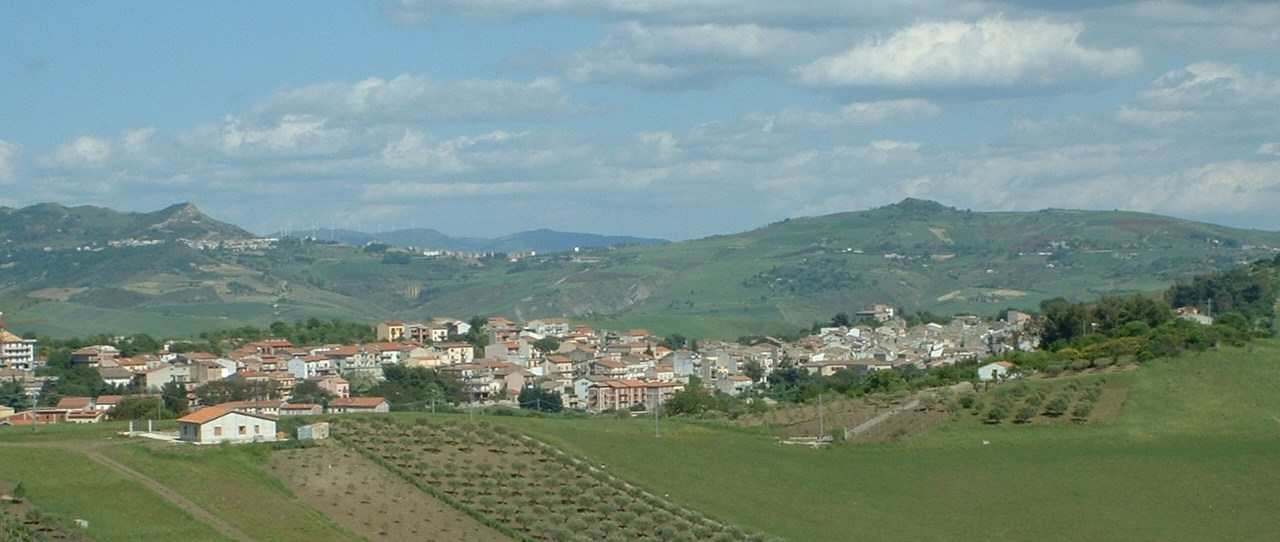

- Location within Italy Location within Sicily
- Coordinates: 37°47′N 14°3′E
- Country: Italy
- Region: Sicily
- Metropolitan city: Palermo (PA)
- Frazioni: Nociazzi, Calcarelli, Catalani

Government
  - Mayor: Francesco Calderaro

Area
  - Total: 72.6 km^{2} (28.0 sq mi)
- Elevation: 765 m (2,510 ft)

Population (30 November 2016)
  - Total: 3,343
  - Density: 46.0/km^{2} (119/sq mi)
- Demonym: Castellanesi
- Time zone: UTC+1 (CET)
  - Summer (DST): UTC+2 (CEST)
- Postal code: 90020
- Dialing code: 0921
- Patron saint: St. Francis of Paola
- Website: Official website

Castellana Sicula (Sicilian: Castiddana) is a comune (municipality) in the Metropolitan City of Palermo in the Italian region Sicily, located about 70 kilometres (43 mi) southeast of Palermo.

Castellana Sicula borders the following municipalities: Petralia Sottana, Polizzi Generosa, Villalba.
