= Blufi =

- Comune
- Comune di Blufi
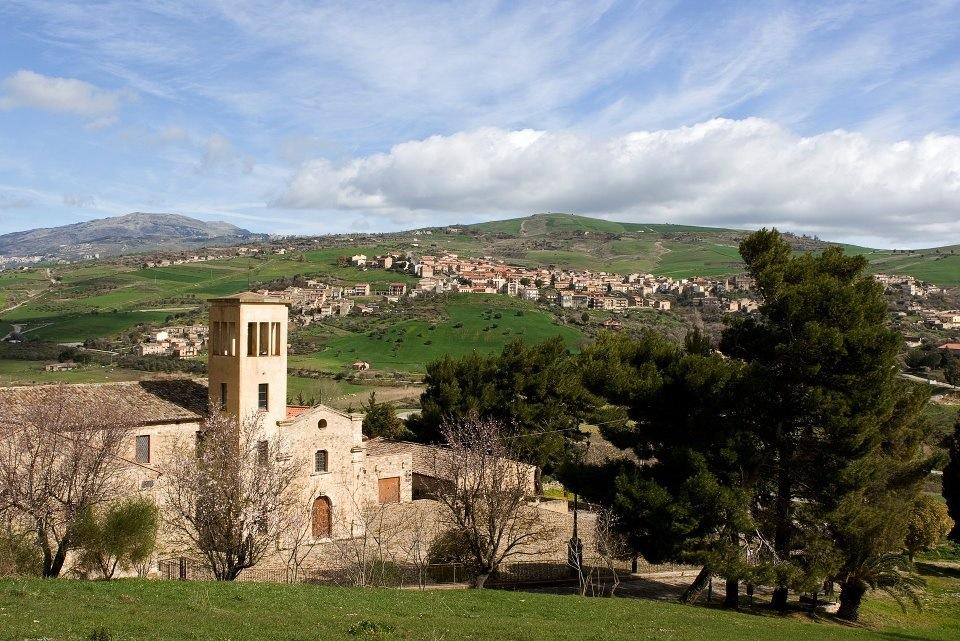

- Location within Italy Location within Sicily
- Coordinates: 37°45′N 14°4′E
- Country: Italy
- Region: Sicily
- Metropolitan city: Palermo (PA)

Government
  - Mayor: Vittorio Castrianni

Area
  - Total: 20.5 km^{2} (7.9 sq mi)
- Elevation: 726 m (2,382 ft)

Population (30 November 2016)
  - Total: 1,012
  - Density: 49.4/km^{2} (128/sq mi)
- Demonym: Blufesi
- Time zone: UTC+1 (CET)
  - Summer (DST): UTC+2 (CEST)
- Postal code: 90020
- Dialing code: 0921
- Patron saint: Madonna dell'Olio
- Saint day: 17/19 August
- Website: Official website

Blufi is a comune (municipality) in the Metropolitan City of Palermo in the Italian region Sicily, located about 70 kilometres (43 mi) southeast of Palermo.

Blufi borders the following municipalities: Alimena, Bompietro, Gangi, Petralia Soprana, Petralia Sottana, Resuttano.

== Geography ==
The village is situated on a hill on the southern slope of the Madonie mountain range, with an altitude between 850 and 500 meters above sea level.

The municipal area extends for 20 km^{2} around the capital center and includes the administrative zone of Casalgiordano, between the municipalities of Gangi and Alimena.

The other hamlets, on the other hand, are located near the capital center: Alleri, Lupi and Ferrarello are separated from it by the Nocilla stream while Calabrò, Nero and Giaia Inferiore almost form a continuation along the road that goes up to the Petralia municipalities.

The territory is crossed by the Southern Imera river and the Nocilla and Oliva streams and is mostly used for agricultural and artisan activities.

== History ==
=== Name ===
The name Blufi appears for the first time in 1211, in a document in which the Palermitan church grants Frederick II, among other concessions, the "Proedia Buluph apud Petraliam", or the possessions called Buluf near Petralia. In a testament of 1482, the name Morata Bufali appears, in other documents the toponyms Belufi, Balufi, Bolufi, are present. In a document relating to the Sanctuary of the Madonna dell'Olio, the current name Blufi is mentioned.

== Landmarks ==
- Romanesque three-arch bridge over the southern Imera river, between the Blufi and Petralia Sottana areas.
- Mother Church of Christ the King (20th century): It is the parish church of the town built in the early years of the last century. The interior with three naves is bare and simple, but enriched by some statues. The church, recently restored, was returned to the faithful during the summer of 2001.
- Sanctuary of the Madonna dell'Olio (8th century): it is located 3 km from the town, at 660 meters above sea level. The name "Madonna dell'Olio" could derive from the presence of olive groves in the area - which would also have given its name to the Oliva stream, which laps the hill of the Sanctuary and which flows into the Southern Imera river, in an area called "Olive Gardens." It could also be from the presence of a mineral oil source a few meters from the Sanctuary.
- Rocca di Marabuto: allegedly, it is a tomb dating back to the Arab domination, being made up of stacked boulders. A legend tells of the presence of a ghost who would inhabit these stones.
