= Engyon =

Ancient Greek town in Sicily

Engyon (Ancient Greek: Ἒγγυον; Latin: Engium; Greek: Ἐγγύον in some Byzantine texts of Ptolemy and Plutarch) is an ancient town of the interior of Magna Graecia in Sicily, a Cretan colony, according to Diodorus Siculus and famous for an ancient temple of the Magna Mater (Mother Rhea) imported from Crete, which aroused the greed of Verres. It took its name from a spring that arose in the land chosen by the colonists, as explained in the following excerpt from Diodorus:

οὐ μὴν ἀλλ᾽ οἱ κατὰ τὴν Σικελίαν Κρῆτες μετὰ τὴν Μίνωος τελευτὴν ἐστασίασαν διὰ τὴν ἀναρχίαν, τῶν δὲ νεῶν ὑπὸ τῶν περὶ τὸν Κώκαλον Σικανῶν ἐμπυρισθεισῶν τὴν μὲν εἰς τὰς πατρίδας ἐπάνοδον ἀπέγνωσαν, κρίναντες δ᾽ ἐν τῇ Σικελίᾳ κατοικεῖν, οἱ μὲν ἐνταῦθα πόλιν ᾤκισαν ἣν ἀπὸ τοῦ βασιλέως αὐτῶν Μινῴαν ὠνόμασαν, οἱ δὲ διὰ τῆς μεσογείου πλανηθέντες καὶ καταλαβόμενοι χωρίον ὀχυρὸν ἔκτισαν πόλιν ἣν ἀπὸ τῆς ἐν τῇ πόλει ῥεούσης πηγῆς ὠνόμασαν Ἔγγυον. However, the Cretans of Sicily, after the death of Minos, fell into factious strife, since they had no ruler, and, since their ships had been burned by the Sicani serving under Cocalus, they gave up any hope they had of returning to their native land; and deciding to make their home in Sicily, a part of them established on that island a city to which they gave the name Minoa after their king, and others, after wandering about through the interior of the island, seized a place which was naturally strong and founded a city to which they gave the name Engyum, after the spring which flowed forth within the city.

Timoleon attacked the city, while the tyrant Leptines (Ancient Greek: Λεπτίνης) was the ruler. After he defeated the Leptines, he restored its autonomy.

Its site is uncertain; some topographers have identified it with Gangi, a town 30 km SSE of Cefalù, but only on the ground of the similarity of the two names. Others identify it with Troina.
