= Ficarazzi =

- Comune
- Comune di Ficarazzi
- Location within Italy Location within Sicily
- Coordinates: 38°5′N 13°28′E
- Country: Italy
- Region: Sicily
- Metropolitan city: Palermo (PA)

Government
  - Mayor: Paolo Francesco Martorana

Area
  - Total: 3.53 km^{2} (1.36 sq mi)
- Elevation: 23 m (75 ft)

Population (31 July 2017)
  - Total: 13,039
  - Density: 3,690/km^{2} (9,570/sq mi)
- Demonym: Ficarazzesi
- Time zone: UTC+1 (CET)
  - Summer (DST): UTC+2 (CEST)
- Postal code: 90010
- Dialing code: 091
- Website: Official website

Ficarazzi is a comune (municipality) in the Metropolitan City of Palermo in the Italian region of Sicily, located about 10 kilometres (6 mi) southeast of Palermo.

Ficarazzi borders the following municipalities: Bagheria, Misilmeri, Palermo, Villabate.
