= Giuliana, Sicily =

Giuliana
- Comune
- Comune di Giuliana
- Location within Italy Location within Sicily
- Coordinates: 37°40′N 13°14′E
- Country: Italy
- Region: Sicily
- Metropolitan city: Palermo (PA)

Area
  - Total: 24.2 km^{2} (9.3 sq mi)

Population (Dec. 2004)
  - Total: 2,234
  - Density: 92.3/km^{2} (239/sq mi)
- Time zone: UTC+1 (CET)
  - Summer (DST): UTC+2 (CEST)
- Postal code: 90030
- Dialing code: 091
- Website: Official website

Giuliana (Italian: [dʒuˈljaːna]) is a comune (municipality) in the Metropolitan City of Palermo in Sicily, located about 50 kilometres (31 mi) south of Palermo. As of 31 December 2004, it had a population of 2,234 and an area of 24.2 square kilometres (9.3 mi^{2}).

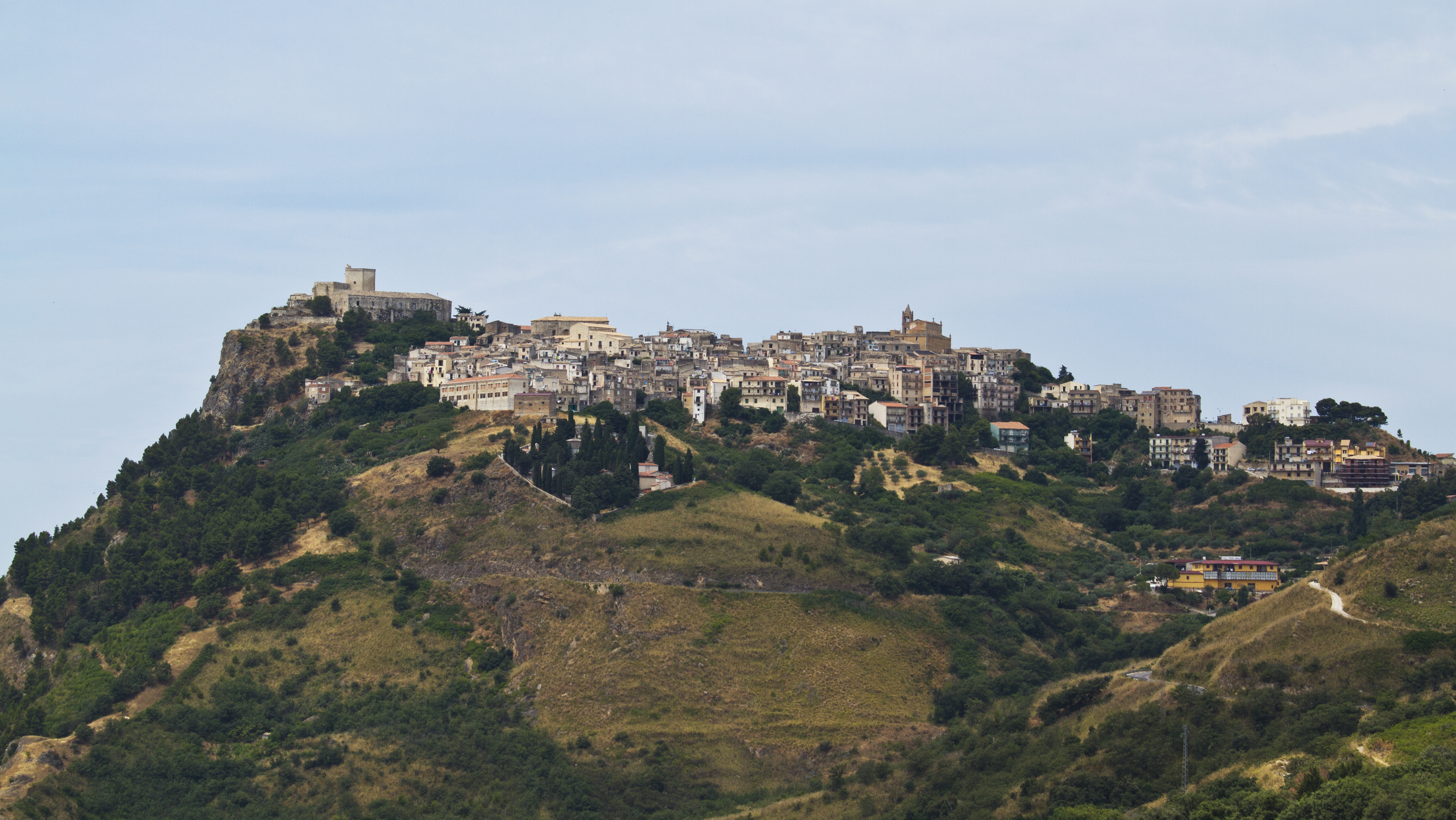
Panorama of Giuliana

Giuliana borders the following municipalities: Bisacquino, Caltabellotta, Chiusa Sclafani, Contessa Entellina, Sambuca di Sicilia.

== Demographic evolution ==
Historical population

Year	Pop.	±%
1861	3,454	—
1871	3,635	+5.2%
1881	3,599	−1.0%
1901	3,347	−7.0%
1911	3,379	+1.0%

Year	Pop.	±%
1921	3,229	−4.4%
1931	3,142	−2.7%
1936	3,219	+2.5%
1951	3,333	+3.5%
1961	3,148	−5.6%

Year	Pop.	±%
1971	2,619	−16.8%
1981	2,512	−4.1%
1991	2,478	−1.4%
2001	2,305	−7.0%

Source: Data from ISTAT
