= San Cipirello =

- Comune
- Comune di San Cipirello
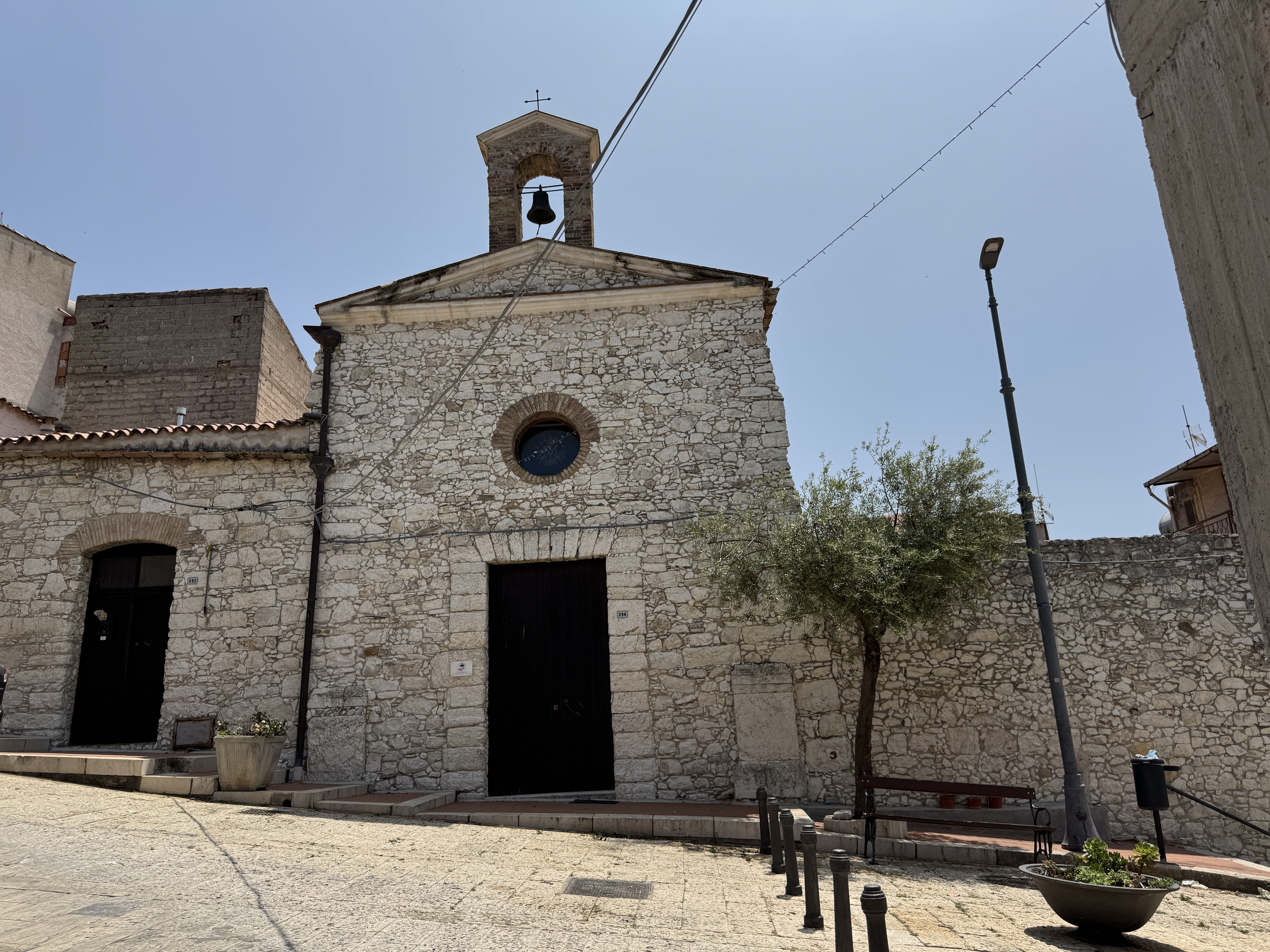

- Location within Italy Location within Sicily
- Coordinates: 37°58′N 13°11′E
- Country: Italy
- Region: Sicily
- Metropolitan city: Palermo (PA)

Area
  - Total: 20.9 km^{2} (8.1 sq mi)
- Elevation: 394 m (1,293 ft)

Population (Dec. 2004)
  - Total: 5,201
  - Density: 249/km^{2} (645/sq mi)
- Demonym: Sancipirellesi
- Time zone: UTC+1 (CET)
  - Summer (DST): UTC+2 (CEST)
- Postal code: 90040
- Dialing code: 091

San Cipirello (Sicilian: San Cipirreḍḍu) is a comune (municipality) in the Metropolitan City of Palermo in the Italian region Sicily, located about 25 kilometres (16 mi) southwest of Palermo. As of 31 December 2004, it had a population of 5,201 and an area of 20.9 square kilometres (8.1 mi^{2}).

San Cipirello borders the following municipalities: Monreale, San Giuseppe Jato.

== International relations ==
=== Twin towns – Sister cities ===
San Cipirello is twinned with:

- Lucera, Italy (since 1989)

== Demographic evolution ==
Historical population

Year	Pop.	±%
1861	2,081	—
1871	2,411	+15.9%
1881	3,573	+48.2%
1901	4,185	+17.1%
1911	3,768	−10.0%

Year	Pop.	±%
1921	5,204	+38.1%
1931	4,497	−13.6%
1936	4,524	+0.6%
1951	5,025	+11.1%
1961	4,709	−6.3%

Year	Pop.	±%
1971	4,634	−1.6%
1981	5,048	+8.9%
1991	5,048	+0.0%
2001	5,016	−0.6%

Source: Data from ISTAT
