= Chiusa Sclafani =

- Comune
- Comune di Chiusa Sclafani
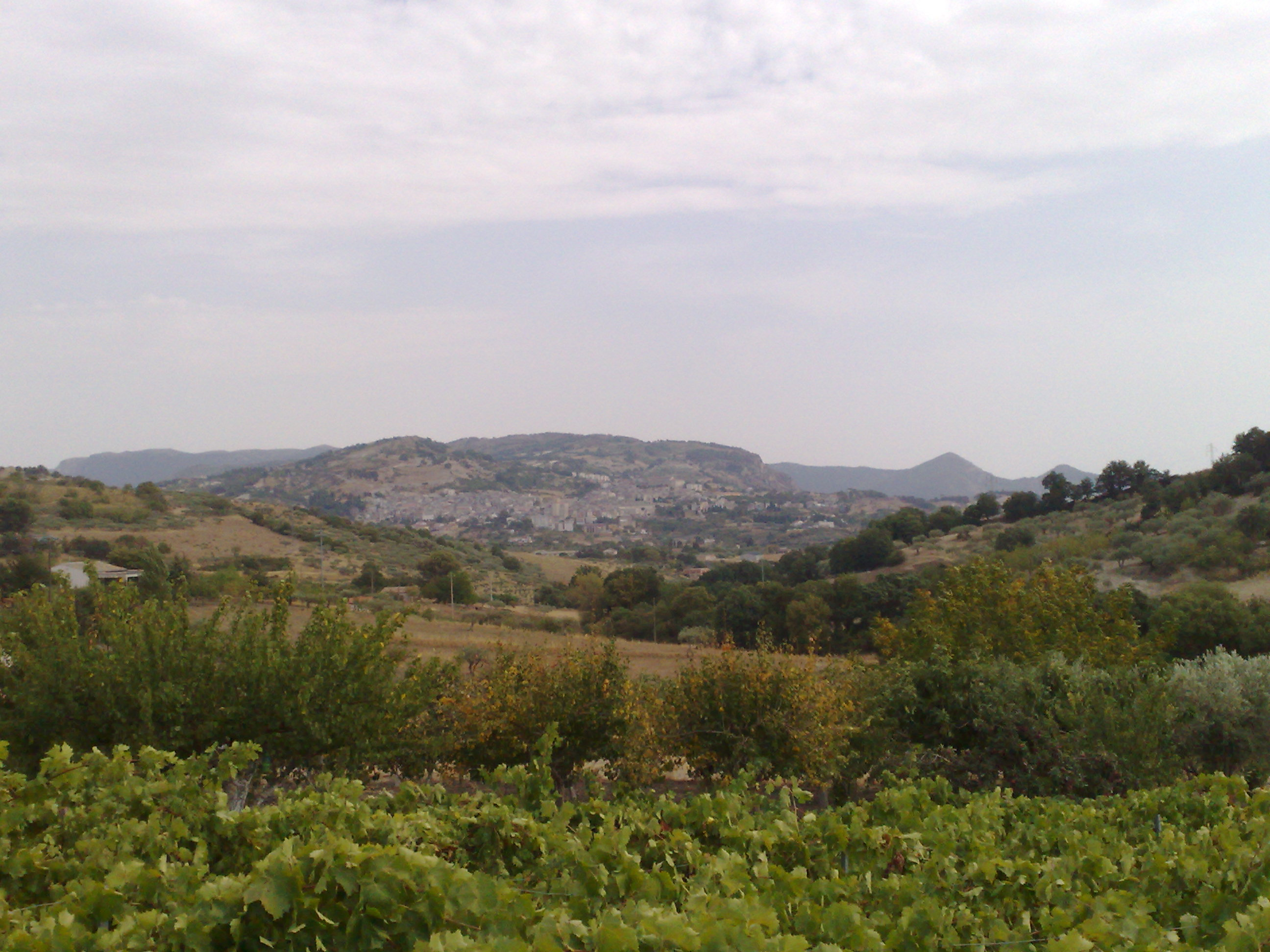

- Location within Italy Location within Sicily
- Coordinates: 37°41′N 13°16′E
- Country: Italy
- Region: Sicily
- Metropolitan city: Palermo (PA)
- Frazioni: San Carlo

Government
  - Mayor: Francesco Di Giorgio

Area
  - Total: 57.4 km^{2} (22.2 sq mi)
- Elevation: 658 m (2,159 ft)

Population (30 June 2017)
  - Total: 2,766
  - Density: 48.2/km^{2} (125/sq mi)
- Demonym: Chiusesi or Chiusalini
- Time zone: UTC+1 (CET)
  - Summer (DST): UTC+2 (CEST)
- Postal code: 90033
- Dialing code: 091
- Website: Official website

Chiusa Sclafani is a comune (municipality) in the Metropolitan City of Palermo in the Italian region Sicily, located about 50 kilometres (31 mi) south of Palermo.

Chiusa Sclafani borders the following municipalities: Bisacquino, Burgio, Caltabellotta, Corleone, Giuliana, Palazzo Adriano.

== Twin cities ==
- Chiclana de Segura, Spain
- Montanaro, Italy
