= Province of Caltanissetta =

Coordinates: 37.49°N 14.05°E

Province of Caltanissetta Provincia di Caltanissetta (Italian) Pruvincia di Cartanissetta (Sicilian)
- Province
- Free Municipal Consortium of Caltanissetta; Libero consorzio comunale di Caltanissetta (Italian)
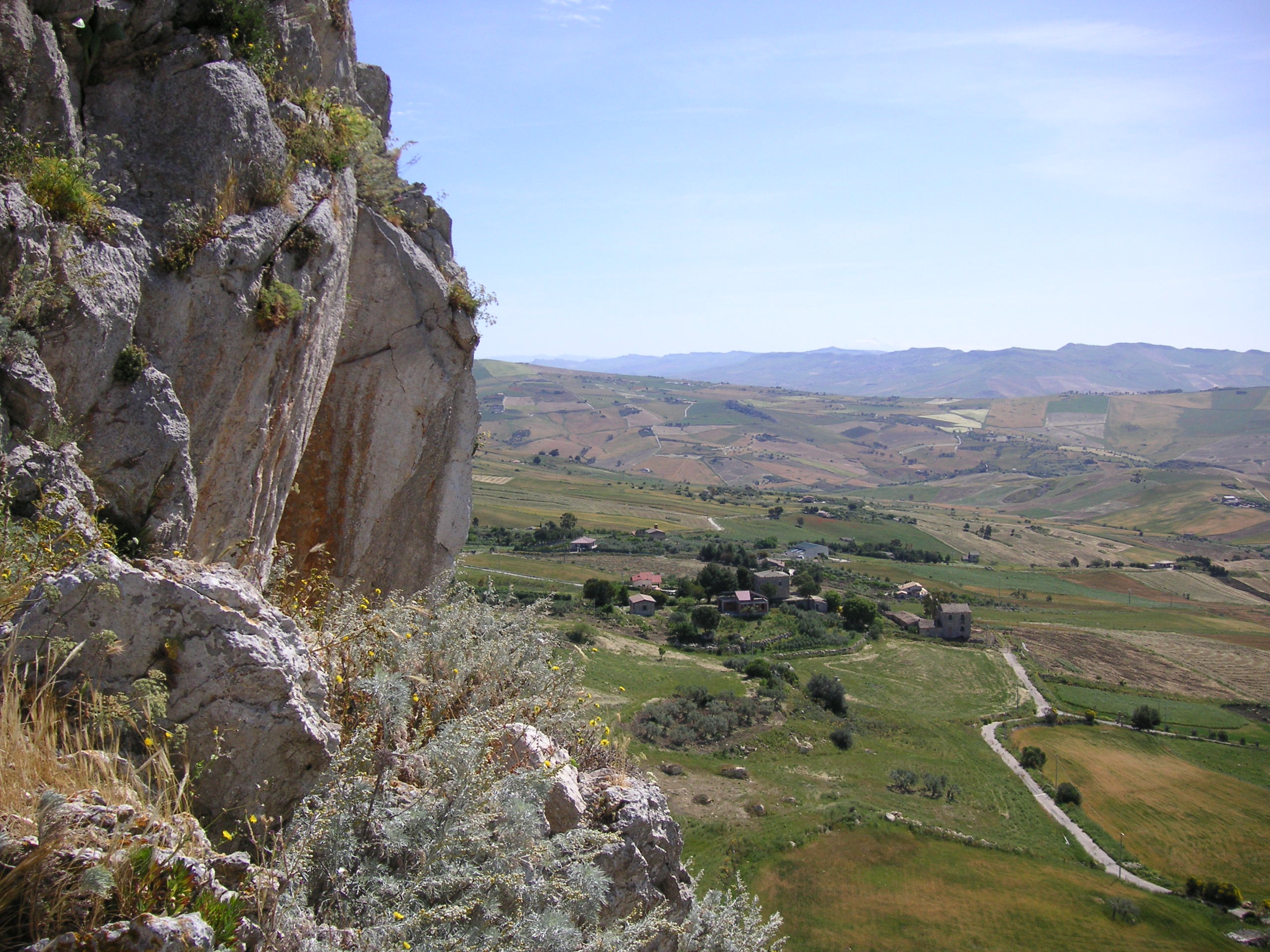
- Landscape at Mussomeli

- Coat of arms

- Location of the province of Caltanissetta in Italy
- Country: Italy
- Region: Sicily
- Capital(s): Caltanissetta
- Municipalities: 22

Government
  - President: Walter Tesauro (FI)

Area
  - Total: 2,138.37 km^{2} (825.63 sq mi)

Population (2026)
  - Total: 243,501
  - Density: 113.872/km^{2} (294.928/sq mi)

GDP
  - Total: €4.163 billion (2015)
  - Per capita: €15,255 (2015)
- Time zone: UTC+1 (CET)
  - Summer (DST): UTC+2 (CEST)
- Postal code: 93100, 93010-93020
- Telephone prefix: 0934, 0933, 0922
- Vehicle registration: CL
- ISTAT code: 085

The province of Caltanissetta (Italian: provincia di Caltanissetta; Sicilian: pruvincia di Nissa or pruvincia di Cartanissetta; officially libero consorzio comunale di Caltanissetta) is a province in the southern part of the autonomous island region of Sicily in Italy. Following the suppression of the Sicilian provinces, it was replaced in 2015 by the free municipal consortium of Caltanissetta (Italian: libero consorzio comunale di Caltanissetta).

It has a population of 243,501 in an area 2,138.37 square kilometres (825.63 sq mi) of across its 22 municipalities.

Its coat of arms is a red crest and two green leaf stems on top with a laurel leaf on the right and a crown in the middle. The River Salso is the main river of the province; it is 122 kilometres (76 mi) long and originates in the province of Palermo, and it flows into the Mediterranean in this province at the end of the Gulf of Gela.

== Geography ==
The province extends to the central part of Sicily in the northwestern direction where the capital is located. The commune of Resuttano is found in an enclave of the province of Palermo near Caltanissetta between Monte Stretto and Portella del Vento. Another example in the same province is that of the two small localities of Cannetti and Corfidato, two hamlets (Frazioni) of the municipality of Enna, 15 km (9.3 mi) away, within the territory of the municipality of Caltanissetta. The land extends to the Gela Plain and into the Gulf of Gela, where the main river of the province, the Salso, meets the Mediterranean.

The province borders the province of Agrigento to the west, the Metropolitan City of Palermo to the north-west, the province of Enna to the north, the Metropolitan City of Catania to the north-east, and the province of Ragusa to the east.

== Municipalities ==
The province has 22 municipalities:

- Acquaviva Platani
- Bompensiere
- Butera
- Caltanissetta
- Campofranco
- Delia
- Marianopoli
- Gela
- Mazzarino
- Milena
- Montedoro
- Mussomeli
- Niscemi
- Resuttano
- Riesi
- San Cataldo
- Santa Caterina Villarmosa
- Serradifalco
- Sommatino
- Sutera
- Vallelunga Pratameno
- Villalba

== Demographics ==
As of 2026, the population is 243,501, of which 48.5% are male, and 51.5% are female. Minors make up 15.2% of the population, and seniors make up 24.6%.

Historical population

| Year | Pop. | ±% |
|---|---|---|
| 1861 | 139,352 | — |
| 1871 | 149,232 | +7.1% |
| 1881 | 170,122 | +14.0% |
| 1901 | 211,038 | +24.1% |
| 1911 | 223,539 | +5.9% |
| 1921 | 253,128 | +13.2% |
| 1931 | 246,032 | −2.8% |
| 1936 | 256,687 | +4.3% |

| Year | Pop. | ±% |
|---|---|---|
| 1951 | 298,496 | +16.3% |
| 1961 | 302,513 | +1.3% |
| 1971 | 282,069 | −6.8% |
| 1981 | 285,829 | +1.3% |
| 1991 | 278,275 | −2.6% |
| 2001 | 274,035 | −1.5% |
| 2011 | 273,099 | −0.3% |
| 2021 | 251,715 | −7.8% |

Source: ISTAT

=== Immigration ===
As of 2025, immigrants make up 5.5% of the population. The 5 largest foreign countries of birth are Romania, Germany, Morocco, Pakistan, and France.

== See also ==
- Sulfur mining in Sicily
