= Petralia Soprana =

- Comune
- Comune di Petralia Soprana
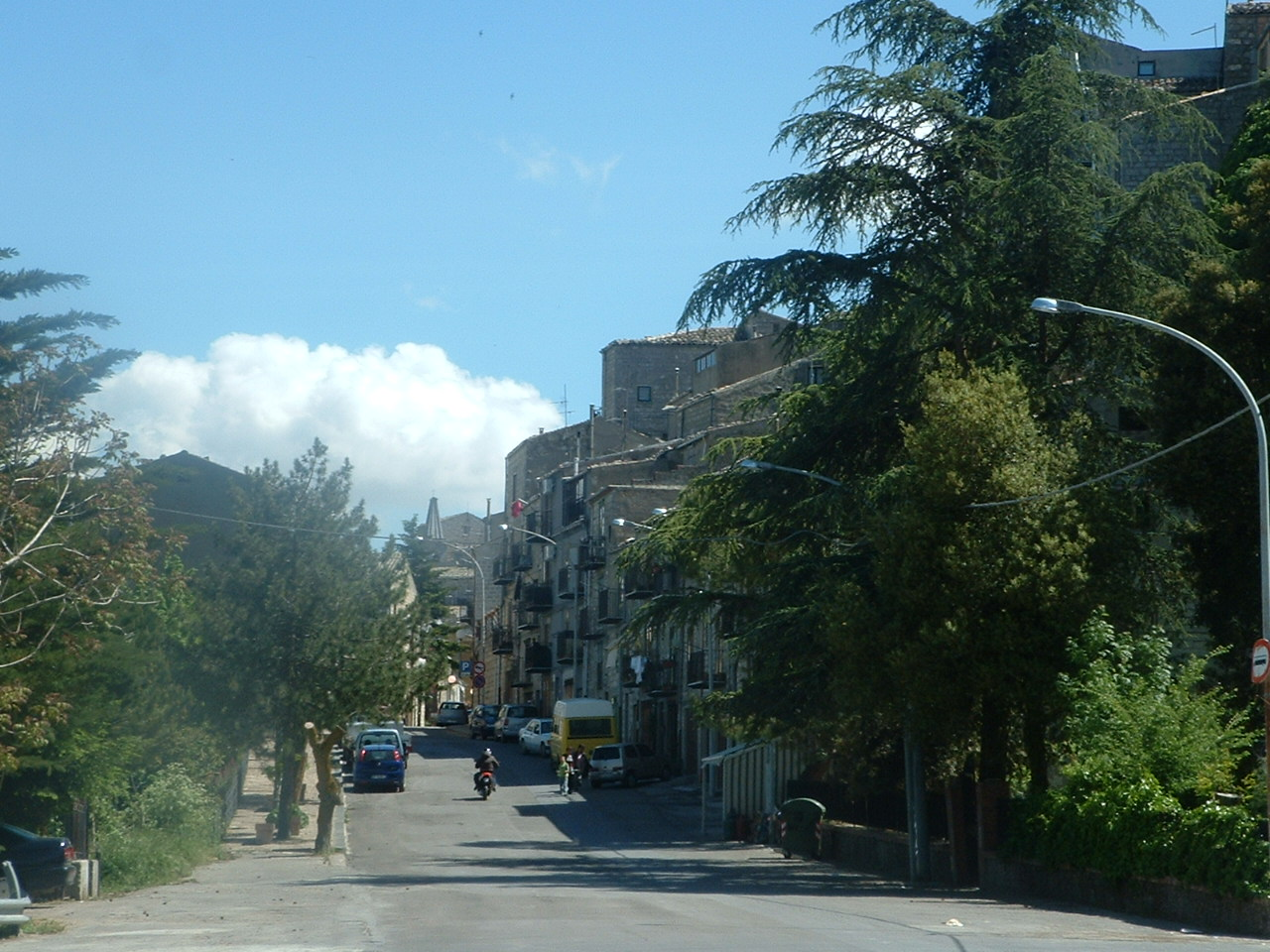

- Location within Italy Location within Sicily
- Coordinates: 37°48′N 14°6′E
- Country: Italy
- Region: Sicily
- Metropolitan city: Palermo (PA)
- Frazioni: Acquamara, Borgo Aiello, Borgo Pala, Cipampini, Cozzo Bianco, Fasanò, Gioiotti, Gulini, Lodico, Lucia, Madonnuzza, Miranti, Pellizzara, Pianello, Pira, Raffo, San Giovanni, SS. Trinità, Sabatini, Saccù, Salaci, Salinella, Scarcini, Scarpella, Serra di Lio, Stretti, Verdi I e Verdi II, Villa Letizia

Area
  - Total: 56.8 km^{2} (21.9 sq mi)

Population (Dec. 2004)
  - Total: 3,630
  - Density: 63.9/km^{2} (166/sq mi)
- Demonym: Petralesi
- Time zone: UTC+1 (CET)
  - Summer (DST): UTC+2 (CEST)
- Postal code: 90026
- Dialing code: 0921

Petralia Soprana (Sicilian: Pitralìa Suprana) is a comune (municipality) in the Metropolitan City of Palermo in the Italian region Sicily, located about 70 kilometres (43 mi) southeast of Palermo. As of 31 December 2004, it had a population of 3,630 and an area of 56.8 square kilometres (21.9 mi^{2}).

The municipality of Petralia Soprana contains the frazioni (subdivisions, mainly villages and hamlets) Acquamara, Borgo Aiello, Borgo Pala, Cipampini, Cozzo Bianco, Fasanò, Gioiotti, Gulini, LoDico, Lucia, Madonnuzza, Miranti, Pellizzara, Pianello, Pira, Raffo, San Giovanni, SS. Trinità, Sabatini, Saccù, Salaci, Salinella, Scarcini, Scarpella, Serra di Lio, Stretti, Verdi I e Verdi II, and Villa Letizia.

Petralia Soprana borders the following municipalities: Alimena, Blufi, Bompietro, Gangi, Geraci Siculo, Petralia Sottana. It is one of I Borghi più belli d'Italia ("The most beautiful villages of Italy").

== Demographic evolution ==
Historical population

Year	Pop.	±%
1861	4,700	—
1871	5,285	+12.4%
1881	6,138	+16.1%
1901	6,438	+4.9%
1911	7,104	+10.3%

Year	Pop.	±%
1921	6,605	−7.0%
1931	5,370	−18.7%
1936	5,549	+3.3%
1951	5,649	+1.8%
1961	5,233	−7.4%

Year	Pop.	±%
1971	4,399	−15.9%
1981	4,109	−6.6%
1991	3,903	−5.0%
2001	3,688	−5.5%

Source: Data from ISTAT
