= Alia, Sicily =

Alia Àlia (Sicilian)
- Comune
- Comune di Alia
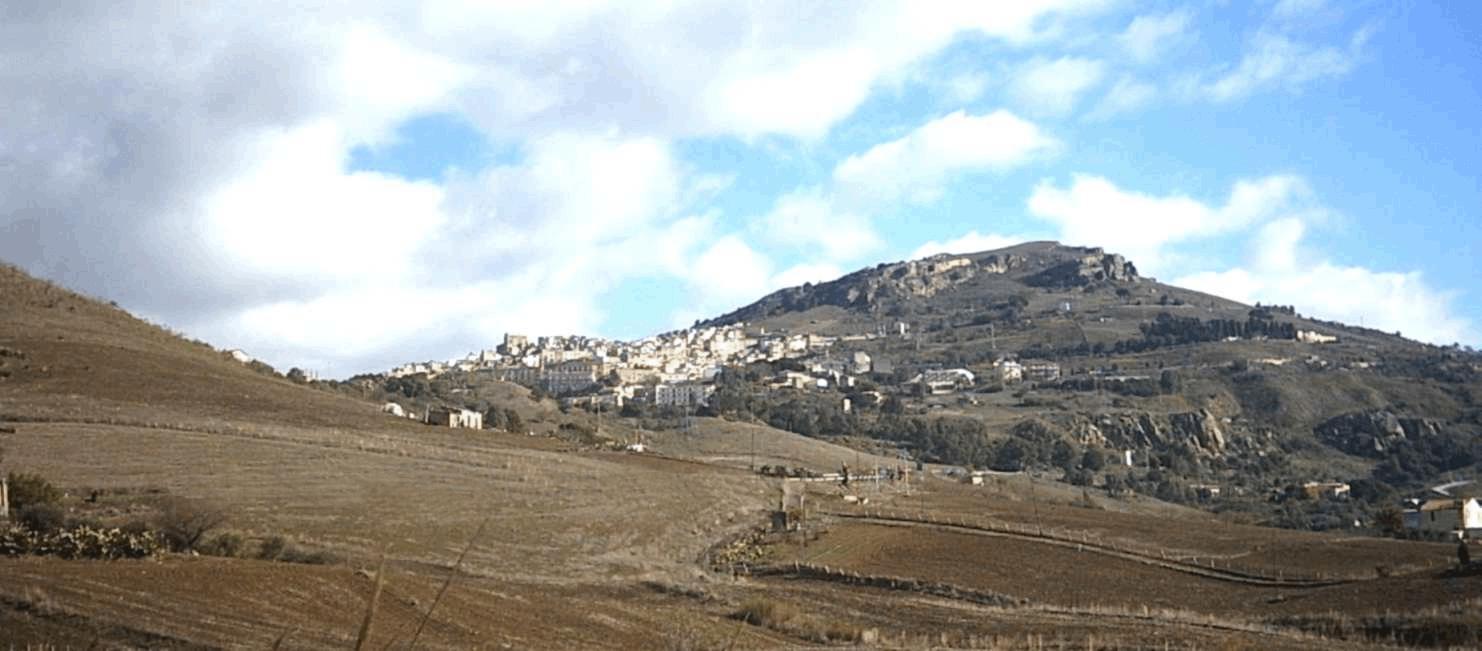

- Location within Italy Location within Sicily
- Coordinates: 37°47′N 13°43′E
- Country: Italy
- Region: Sicily
- Metropolitan city: Palermo (PA)

Government
  - Mayor: Felice Guglielmo

Area
  - Total: 45 km^{2} (17 sq mi)
- Elevation: 700 m (2,300 ft)

Population (30 November 2016)
  - Total: 3,588
  - Density: 80/km^{2} (210/sq mi)
- Demonym: Aliesi
- Time zone: UTC+1 (CET)
  - Summer (DST): UTC+2 (CEST)
- Postal code: 90021
- Dialing code: 091
- Patron saint: Our Lady of Grace
- Saint day: 2 July
- Website: Official website

Alia (Sicilian: Àlia) is a comune in the Metropolitan City of Palermo, on the Italian island of Sicily. It is known for the Grotte Della Gurfa, or Gurfa Caves Urban Reserve.
