= San Mauro Castelverde =

- Comune
- Comune di San Mauro Castelverde
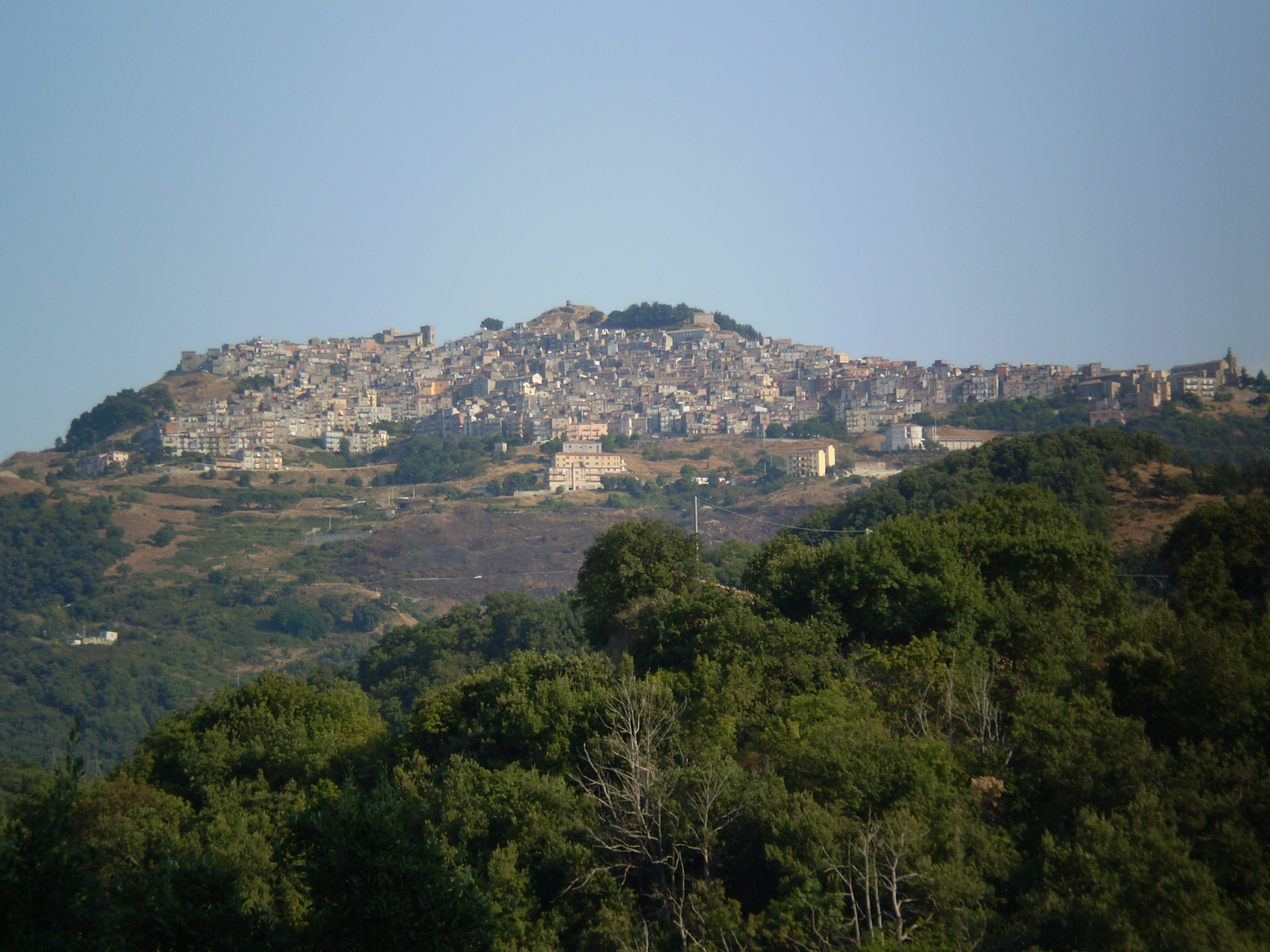

- Location within Italy Location within Sicily
- Coordinates: 37°54′52″N 14°11′26″E
- Country: Italy
- Region: Sicily
- Metropolitan city: Palermo (PA)

Government
  - Mayor: Giuseppe Minutilla

Area
  - Total: 114.37 km^{2} (44.16 sq mi)
- Elevation: 1,050 m (3,440 ft)

Population (2026)
  - Total: 1,279
  - Density: 11.18/km^{2} (28.96/sq mi)
- Demonym: Maurini
- Time zone: UTC+1 (CET)
  - Summer (DST): UTC+2 (CEST)
- Postal code: 90010
- Dialing code: 0921
- Patron saint: Saint Maurus Abbot
- Saint day: 15 January
- Website: Official website

San Mauro Castelverde (Sicilian: Santu Màuru) is a town and comune (municipality) in the Metropolitan City of Palermo in the autonomous island region of Sicily in Italy. It has 1,279 inhabitants.

== Demographics ==
As of 2026, the population is 1,279, of which 49.9% are male, and 50.1% are female. Minors make up 12% of the population, and seniors make up 34.3%.

Historical population

Year	Pop.	±%
1861	4,634	—
1871	5,012	+8.2%
1881	5,608	+11.9%
1901	5,891	+5.0%
1911	6,329	+7.4%
1921	5,428	−14.2%
1931	5,120	−5.7%
1936	5,121	+0.0%

Year	Pop.	±%
1951	4,875	−4.8%
1961	4,698	−3.6%
1971	3,434	−26.9%
1981	3,151	−8.2%
1991	2,565	−18.6%
2001	2,166	−15.6%
2011	1,847	−14.7%
2021	1,384	−25.1%

Source: ISTAT

=== Immigration ===
As of 2025, of the known countries of birth of 1,293 residents, the most numerous are: Italy (1,273 – 98.5%).

== Notable people ==
Notable persons from San Mauro Castelverde include Santa Biondo, who immigrated to the United States as a child and became famous as an opera singer during the 1930s.

== International relations ==
San Mauro Castelverde is twinned with:

- Quilmes, Argentina
- (Republic of Ireland) Rush, Ireland
