= Santa Caterina Villarmosa =

- Comune
- Comune di Santa Caterina Villarmosa
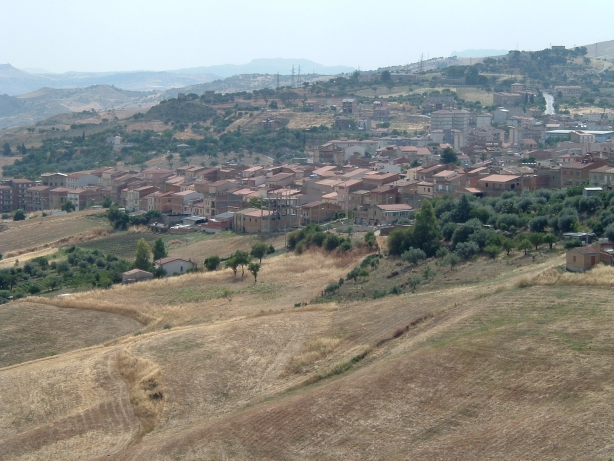

- Coat of arms

- Location within Italy Location within Sicily
- Coordinates: 37°36′N 14°2′E
- Country: Italy
- Region: Sicily
- Province: Caltanissetta (CL)
- Frazioni: San Nicola, Turolifi

Government
  - Mayor: Giuseppe Ippolito

Area
  - Total: 75.1 km^{2} (29.0 sq mi)
- Elevation: 650 m (2,130 ft)

Population (2007)
  - Total: 5,814
  - Density: 77.4/km^{2} (201/sq mi)
- Demonym: Caterinesi
- Time zone: UTC+1 (CET)
  - Summer (DST): UTC+2 (CEST)
- Postal code: 93018
- Dialing code: 0934

Santa Caterina Villarmosa (Sicilian: Santa Catarina) is a comune (municipality) in the Province of Caltanissetta in the Italian region of Sicily. It is located about 80 kilometres (50 mi) southeast of Palermo and about 13 kilometres (8 mi) north of Caltanissetta.

The local economy is mostly based on agriculture (grain, olives, almonds).
