= Sicilian Mafia during the Fascist regime =

The Sicilian Mafia was less active during the era of Fascist Italy and it was fought by Benito Mussolini's government. In June 1924, Mussolini instructed Cesare Mori to eradicate the Mafia from Sicily and on October 25, 1925, appointed Mori prefect of the Sicilian capital, Palermo.

== History ==
In 1924, Mussolini initiated a campaign to destroy the Sicilian Mafia, which undermined Fascist control of Sicily. A successful campaign would legitimize his rule and strengthen his leadership. Not only would a campaign against the Mafia be a propaganda opportunity for Mussolini and the National Fascist Party, but it would also allow him to suppress his political opponents in Sicily, since many Sicilian politicians had Mafia links. According to a popular account that arose after the end of World War II, as prime minister of the Kingdom of Italy, Mussolini had visited Sicily in May 1924 and passed through Piana dei Greci, where he was received by the mayor and Mafia boss Francesco Cuccia. At some point, Cuccia expressed surprise at Mussolini’s police escort and is said to have whispered in his ear: "You are with me, you are under my protection. What do you need all these cops for?" Mussolini was outraged. According to scholar Christopher Duggan, the reason was more political rather than personal: the Mafia threatened and undermined his power in Sicily, and a successful campaign would strengthen him as the new leader, legitimising and empowering his rule.

The Mafia undermined Mussolini through their involvement in the Sicilian government post Italian unification. The Italian state had difficulty administering protection and enforcing the law which created a power vacuum that was gradually filled by the Mafia. Politicians' systemic use of the organization gradually integrated them into the political and social system on the island, and their involvement in construction projects, agriculture and private protection allowed them into each of these economic sectors. In the 1890s, the Mafia began to deviate from the urban areas they had frequently been present in and expanded towards the more rural areas to employ their coercive powers at the request of landlords to overthrow the socialist peasant fasci.

Although the Sicilian community considered the Mafia to be a "social plague", mainly due to their control in the agricultural sector, they were hard to compete with politically. They had an intrinsic relationship with local political and law enforcement structures. They often funded politicians who were under their protection in exchange for political favors. Mafia bosses were able to manipulate elections to their advantage and violently overthrew any opposition. The Mafia also practiced voter intimidation through the use of verbal menacing or physical attacks. Additionally, the Mafia had a negative effect on the Sicilian economy; in response Mussolini enacted Mezzogiorno policies in an effort to counteract their impact. Considering the Mafia’s integration with the government and economy, their corruption was hard to contain. As the Mafia threatened Mussolini's control and legitimacy, the campaign to exterminate them would benefit him and his regime. Mussolini's Minister of the Interior, Luigi Federzoni, recalled Mori to active service and appointed him prefect of Trapani. Mori arrived in Trapani in June 1924 and stayed until October 20, 1925, when Mussolini appointed him prefect of Palermo. Mussolini granted Mori special powers to eradicate the Mafia by any means possible. In a telegram, Mussolini wrote to Mori: "Your Excellency has carte bianche, the authority of the State must absolutely, I repeat absolutely, be re-established in Sicily. If the laws still in force hinder you, this will be no problem, as we will draw up new laws."

Mori formed a small army of policemen, carabinieri and militiamen, which went from town to town, rounding up suspects. To force suspects to surrender, they would take their families hostage, confiscate their property, and publicly slaughter their livestock. Confessions were sometimes extracted through beatings and torture. Some Mafia members who had been on the losing end of Mafia feuds voluntarily cooperated with prosecutors to secure protection and exact revenge. Charges of Mafia association were typically leveled at poor peasants and gabellotti (tenant farmers), but generally not leveled at wealthy landowners. By 1928, over 11,000 suspects were arrested. Many were tried en masse. More than 1,200 were convicted and imprisoned, and many others were internally exiled without trial. In order to destroy the Mafia, Mori felt it necessary to "forge a direct bond between the population and the state, to annul the system of intermediation under which citizens could not approach the authorities except through middlemen..., receiving as a favour that which is due them as their right." Mori’s methods were sometimes similar to those of the Mafia: He did not just arrest the bandits, but sought to humiliate them as well. Mori aimed to convince Sicilians that the Fascist government was powerful enough to rival the Mafia and that the Mafia could no longer protect them.

Mori's inquiries brought evidence of collusion between the Mafia and influential members of the Italian government and the Fascist Party. His position became more precarious. Some 11,000 arrests were attributed to Mori’s rule in Palermo, creating massive amounts of paperwork which may have been partially responsible for his dismissal in 1929. Mori's campaign ended in June 1929 when Mussolini recalled him to Rome. Although Mori did not permanently crush the Mafia, his campaign was successful at suppressing it. The Mafia informant Antonino Calderone reminisced: "The music changed. Mafiosi had a hard life. ... After the war the mafia hardly existed anymore. The Sicilian Families had all been broken up." Sicily's murder rate sharply declined. Landowners were able to raise the legal rents on their lands; sometimes as much as ten-thousandfold. The Fascist Party propaganda machine proudly announced that the Mafia had been defeated. Many Mafia members fled to the United States. Among these were Carlo Gambino and Joseph Bonanno, who became powerful Mafia bosses in New York City.

A second government campaign against the Mafia occurred from 1933 to 1939; however, since the regime had already declared that the Mafia phenomenon had been completely eliminated (Mussolini had ordered that the word mafia no longer be used in public discourse), the second campaign was not publicised like the first one. The second campaign was carried out through the Police Inspectorate for Sicily (Ispettorato generale di pubblica sicurezza per la Sicilia), headed by Giuseppe Gueli, who had served under Mori. Gueli reported to Mussolini's chief of police Arturo Bocchini that Mafia groups had not been eliminated and had actually rapidly reorganised after the first anti-Mafia campaign. The second campaign made use of a large network of informers and, most likely, torture. It also produced extensive documentation of the Mafia's internal organisation.

In 1943, nearly half a million Allied troops invaded Sicily during Operation Husky. Crime soared in the upheaval and chaos. Many inmates escaped from their prisons, banditry returned and the black market thrived. During the first six months of Allied occupation, party politics in Sicily were banned. Most institutions, with the exception of the police and carabinieri were destroyed, and the Allied occupiers had to build a new order from scratch. As Fascist mayors were deposed, the Allied Military Government of Occupied Territories (AMGOT) simply appointed replacements. Many turned out to be former Mafia members, such as Calogero Vizzini and Giuseppe Genco Russo. They easily presented themselves as fascist dissidents and their anti-communist positions strengthened their bids for political offices. Mafia bosses reformed their clans, absorbing some of the marauding bandits into their ranks.

== Legal basis ==
In 1926, the Fascist government of Italy passed a law which allowed anyone to denounce someone as being a member of a criminal organization, and the accused could then be imprisoned or forcibly resettled elsewhere in the country without trial. This law was very useful to Mori in persecuting the Mafia, although it was inevitably used to persecute their political figures and settle personal scores.

== Sources ==
- Acemoglu, Daron; De Feo, Giuseppe; De Luca, Giacomo (December 2017). Weak States: Causes and Consequences of the Sicilian Mafia (PDF) (Report). NBER Working Paper 24115. Cambridge, MA: National Bureau of Economic Research. doi:10.3386/w24115.
- Coco, Vittorio (November 2017). "Christopher Duggan, the mafia and Fascism". Modern Italy. 22 (4): 371–380. doi:10.1017/mit.2017.58. ISSN 1353-2944.
- Costanzo, Ezio (2007). The Mafia and the Allies: Sicily 1943 and the Return of the Mafia. New York: Enigma Books. ISBN 978-1-929631-68-1.
- Dickie, John (2007). Cosa Nostra: A History of the Sicilian Mafia. Hodder. ISBN 978-0-340-93526-2.
- Duggan, Christopher (1989). Fascism and the Mafia. New Haven: Yale University Press. ISBN 0-300-04372-4.
- —— (2008). The Force of Destiny: A History of Italy Since 1796. Houghton Mifflin Harcourt. ISBN 0-618-35367-4.
- Finkelstein, Monte S. (1998). Separatism, the Allies and the Mafia: The Struggle for Sicilian Independence 1943-1948. Bethlehem, PA: Lehigh University Press. ISBN 9780934223515.
- Lupo, Salvatore (2009). The History of the Mafia. New York: Columbia University Press. ISBN 978-0-231-13134-6.
- Mori, Cesare (1933). The Last Struggle With the Mafia. London: Putnam. OCLC 00770286.
- Newark, Tim (May 2007). "Fighting the Mafia in World War Two". AmericanMafia.com. Archived from the original on 8 July 2007.
- —— (2007). Mafia Allies: The True Story of America's Secret Alliance with the Mob in World War II. Saint Paul, MN: Zenith Press. ISBN 0-7603-2457-3. (Review)
- Petacco, Arrigo. L'uomo della provvidenza: Mussolini, ascesa e caduta di un mito (in Italian). Milan: Mondadori. ISBN 9788804534662.
- Pickering-Iazzi, Robin, ed. (2007). Mafia and Outlaw Stories from Italian Life and Literature. Toronto Italian Studies. University of Toronto Press. ISBN 978-0-8020-9834-4.
- Raab, Selwyn (2005). Five Families: The Rise, Decline, and Resurgence of America's Most Powerful Mafia Empires. New York: Thomas Dunne Books. ISBN 978-0-312-30094-4.
- Servadio, Gaia (1976). Mafioso: A History of the Mafia from Its Origins to the Present Day. London: Secker & Warburg. ISBN 0-436-44700-2.
