= Cesare Mori =

Italian prefect (1871-1942)

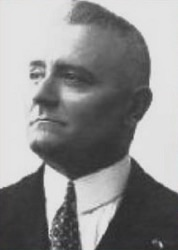

Member of the Senate of the Kingdom
- In office 10 January 1928 – 5 July 1942
- Appointed by: Victor Emmanuel III

Prefect of Palermo
- In office 1 November 1925 – 1 June 1929
- Preceded by: Angelo Barbieri
- Succeeded by: Umberto Albini

Prefect of Trapani
- In office 2 June 1924 – 12 October 1925
- Preceded by: Giovanni Antonio Merizzi
- Succeeded by: Francesco Venuto

Police commissioner of Castelvetrano
- In office 1909–1915

Personal details
- Born: 22 December 1871 Pavia, Kingdom of Italy
- Died: 5 July 1942 (aged 70) Udine, Friuli, Kingdom of Italy
- Party: National Fascist Party
- Spouse(s): Angelina Salvi (m. 1897–1942); her death
- Education: University of Palermo (Hd)
- Profession: Soldier, police officer, politician
- Nickname: "The Iron Prefect"

Military service
- Allegiance: Kingdom of Italy
- Branch/service: Royal Italian Army
- Years of service: 1895–1898

Cesare Mori (Italian pronunciation: [ˈtʃeːzare ˈmɔri, ˈtʃɛː-]; 22 December 1871 – 5 July 1942) was a prefect (prefetto) before and during the Italian Fascism period. He is known in Italy as the "Iron Prefect" (Prefetto di Ferro) because of his iron-fisted campaigns against the Sicilian Mafia in the second half of the 1920s. The 1977 film I Am the Law, directed by Pasquale Squitieri, is about his fight against the Mafia when he was prefect in Sicily. Mori is also known for being the first to ever destroy the influence of the Mafia within Italy.

Mori described himself as a Fascist, and wrote strongly of his admiration of the effectiveness of both the National Fascist Party and Benito Mussolini several times in his self authored accounts in Sicily. He said, "What caused the undoubted efforts made in the past to peter out was a feeling of listlessness, in the minds of the people which seemed refractory even to unusual stimulants. It was not a reality, it was not a fact, but a feeling; yet the past was infected and dominated by it until the day when, on the coming of Fascism, the Duce in person broke the evil spell."

== Early years ==
Mori was born in Pavia in Lombardy and grew up in an orphanage and was only recognised by his natural parents in October 1879 at the age of seven. He studied at the Turin Military Academy; however, he married a girl, Angelina Salvi, who did not have the dowry stipulated by military regulations of the time, and had to resign. He joined the police, serving first in Ravenna, then Castelvetrano in the province of Trapani (Sicily) – where he made his name capturing the bandit Paolo Grisalfi – before moving to Florence in 1915 as vice-quaestor.

At the end of the First World War, the situation of Sicilian criminality got worse when war veterans joined gangs of bandits. In 1919 Mori was sent back to Sicily as the head of special forces against brigandage. In his roundups, Mori distinguished himself for his energetic and radical methods. At Caltabellotta he arrested more than 300 people in one night. The press wrote of a "lethal blow to the Mafia", but Mori said to a member of his staff :

These people haven't understood yet that brigands and the Mafia are two different things. We have hit the first, who are undoubtedly the most visible aspect of Sicilian criminality, but not the most dangerous one. The true lethal blow to the Mafia will be delivered when we are able to make roundups not only among Prickly Pears, but in prefectures, police headquarters, employers' mansions, and why not, some ministries.

In 1920, he returned to the mainland and served in Turin as quaestor, followed by Rome and Bologna. In 1921 he was prefect of Bologna, and was one of the few members of the forces of law and order to oppose the organised thuggery (squadrismo) of the Fascist movement. Mori was removed and sent to Bari. He retired with his wife to Florence in 1922, when the Fascist leader Benito Mussolini took over the government after the March on Rome.

== Appointed in Sicily ==
His reputation as a man of action caused his recall to active service in 1924 by the Minister of the Interior, Luigi Federzoni. In the same year, Mori joined the Fascist Party. He was next appointed prefect of Trapani. Arriving in June 1924, he stayed there until 20 October 1925, when Mussolini appointed him prefect of Palermo, with special powers over the entire island of Sicily and the mission of eradicating the Mafia by any means possible. In a telegram Mussolini wrote to Mori:

Your Excellency has carte blanche, the authority of the State must absolutely, I repeat absolutely, be re-established in Sicily. Should the laws currently in effect hinder you, that will be no problem, we shall make new laws.

Mussolini's drive against the Mafia, the story goes, followed an official visit to Sicily in May 1924 during which he felt insulted by the Mafioso Francesco Cuccia, who publicly proclaimed that Mussolini did not need a police escort because the mere presence of Cuccia would protect him. Mussolini felt humiliated and outraged. However, according to scholar Christopher Duggan, the reason was more political rather than personal. The Mafia threatened and undermined his power in Sicily, and a successful campaign would strengthen him as the new leader, thus legitimising and strengthening his rule.

== Fight against the Mafia ==
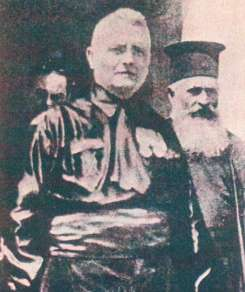
Mori in black shirt

Mori took up his post in Palermo in November 1925 and remained in office until 1929. Within the first two months he arrested over five hundred men, a number that would only grow in the following years. In January 1926, he undertook what was probably his most famous action, the occupation of the village of Gangi, a stronghold of various criminal gangs. Using carabinieri and police forces he ordered house-to-house searches, picking up bandits, small-time Mafia members and various suspects who were on the run. Due to the necessity of the nature of the mafia, he was forced to discreetly collect large amounts of evidence and subsequently make arrests en masse to avoid large numbers of mafiosi going into hiding. As he poetically states, "These operations were carried out in considerable numbers and on a large scale: and the rapidity with which they succeeded one another and the exactness of evidence on which they were based completely strangled the criminal associations which for so many years had flourished with impunity. And the whole island chanted a hymn of liberation." These sweeping mass arrests, earned him the nickname of "Iron Prefect".

Mori understood the basis of Mafia power. In order to defeat the phenomenon, he felt it necessary to "forge a direct bond between the population and the state, to annul the system of mediation under which citizens could not approach the authorities except through middlemen..., receiving as a favour that which is due them as their right." Mori's methods were sometimes similar to those of the Mafia. He did not just arrest the bandits, but sought to humiliate them as well. If he could display a strong central authority to rival the Mafia, people would see that the Mafia was not their only option for protection. He often found evidence of how the Mafia operated, and seized their property and cattle. Mori's inquiries brought evidence of collusion between the Mafia and influential members of the State apparatus and the Fascist party. His position, however, became more precarious. Some 11,000 arrests are attributed to Mori's rule in Palermo. That led to massive amounts of paperwork in order to prepare for the trials, which may have been partially responsible for his dismissal. Mussolini had already nominated Mori as a senator in 1928, and in June 1929 he was relieved of his duties. The Fascist propaganda proudly announced that the Mafia had been defeated.

== Final years ==
As a senator, Mori continued to follow Sicilian affairs closely, and made sure he was always well informed; but he no longer had much political influence. He wrote his memoirs in 1932. Five years later he openly expressed concerns about Mussolini's new alliance with Adolf Hitler, and was isolated inside the Fascist Party from that time on. He retired to Udine in 1941 (though he never formally left the senate), and he died in Udine one year later. By this stage he was a largely forgotten figure in a country preoccupied with the Second World War.

== Impact ==
At the time and since, the general perception was that Mori had smashed the Mafia. Sicily's murder rate sharply declined in the early 1930s. The Mafia pentito Antonio Calderone said that Mori's crackdown had hit the Mafia hard. Some Mafiosi escaped and moved abroad (especially to the United States), such as Joseph Bonanno. Other Mafiosi remained in Sicily and either turned over their fellow Mafiosi (or low-level bandits) to the police or simply went quiet and sought accommodation with the Fascist authorities until the end of the regime in Italy.

With the invasion of Sicily in 1943 and the collapse of the Fascist regime, the Mafia re-established itself, sometimes with the help or ignorance of the Allied Military Government of Occupied Territories (AMGOT). AMGOT needed the support of local elites in order to govern. Because of their local authority, their record of persecution under the Fascist regime, and their willingness to cooperate with the Allies, noted Mafiosi, such as Calogero Vizzini and Giuseppe Genco Russo, were appointed to head local administrations in many of the towns in western Sicily. According to the journalist Michele Pantaleone:

By the beginning of the Second World War, the Mafia had dwindled to a few isolated and scattered groups and could have been completely wiped out if the social problems of the island had been dealt with... the Allied occupation and the subsequent slow restoration of democracy reinstated the Mafia with its full powers, put it once more on the way to becoming a political force, and returned to the Onorata Società the weapons which Fascism had snatched from it.

The neo-fascist politician Giorgio Almirante wrote in Il Borghese in the 1970s that Sicilian society was really transformed by the full destruction of the Mafia in the 1930s, but the destruction of World War II and the imposition of "antifascism", which criticised everything achieved by Fascism, even against mafiosi, together with the return of the (Allies-sponsored) Mafia bosses, who had taken refuge in the United States, was responsible for the Mafia's resurgence in postwar Sicily.

Some 21st-century writers questioned the effectiveness and value of the methods used by Mori against the Mafia. While his methods were certainly effective, at least in the short term, Timothy Newark has written that they mainly targeted the small-time criminals of Sicily and left the big-timers, the real Mafia bosses, relatively unscathed, which drove the Mafia underground but failed to stamp it out. Judith Chubb says, "Fascism succeeded in stamping out the Mafia as a criminal organization by providing a more efficient substitute. It succeeded in monopolizing political power and the use of violence without, however, transforming the social and economic conditions in which the Mafia had flourished. It was thus no surprise that the Mafia re-emerged as soon as Fascism fell."

== In popular culture ==
In Leonardo Sciascia's 1961 novel The Day of the Owl (Il giorno della civetta), the main character, a captain of the Carabinieri, recalls the great popularity of Mori's results among the Sicilian common people, and the widespread nostalgia for Fascism among them at the time. Mori's campaign against the Mafia was the subject of a 1977 film, Il prefetto di ferro, directed by Pasquale Squitieri, starring Giuliano Gemma and Claudia Cardinale, with music by Ennio Morricone. In 2012, the Italian public broadcaster RAI produced Cesare Mori - Il prefetto di ferro.

== Autobiography ==
- Mori, Cesare (1933), The last struggle with the Mafia, London/New York: Putnam

== See also ==
- Sicilian mafia during the Mussolini regime

== Sources ==
- Mori, Cesare (1933) The last struggle with the Mafia, London & New York; Putnam;
- Mori, Cesare (1923) Tra le zagare oltre la foschia, Firenze
- Dickie, John (2004). Cosa Nostra. A history of the Sicilian Mafia, London: Coronet, ISBN 0-340-82435-2
- Duggan, Christopher (1989). Fascism and the Mafia, New Haven: Yale University Press ISBN 0-300-04372-4
- Newark, Tim (2007). Mafia Allies. The True Story of America's Secret Alliance with the Mob in World War II, Saint Paul (MN): Zenith Press ISBN 0-7603-2457-3 (Review)
- Petacco Arrigo (2004). L'uomo della provvidenza: Mussolini, ascesa e caduta di un mito, Milan: Mondadori.
- Petacco, Arrigo (1975/2004). Il prefetto di ferro. L'uomo di Mussolini che mise in ginocchio la mafia, Milan: Mondadori ISBN 88-04-53275-0
- Sciascia, Leonardo (1963). The Day of the Owl (originally published as: Il giorno della civetta, Turin: Einaudi, 1961)
