= Vallelunga Pratameno =

- Comune
- Comune di Vallelunga Pratameno
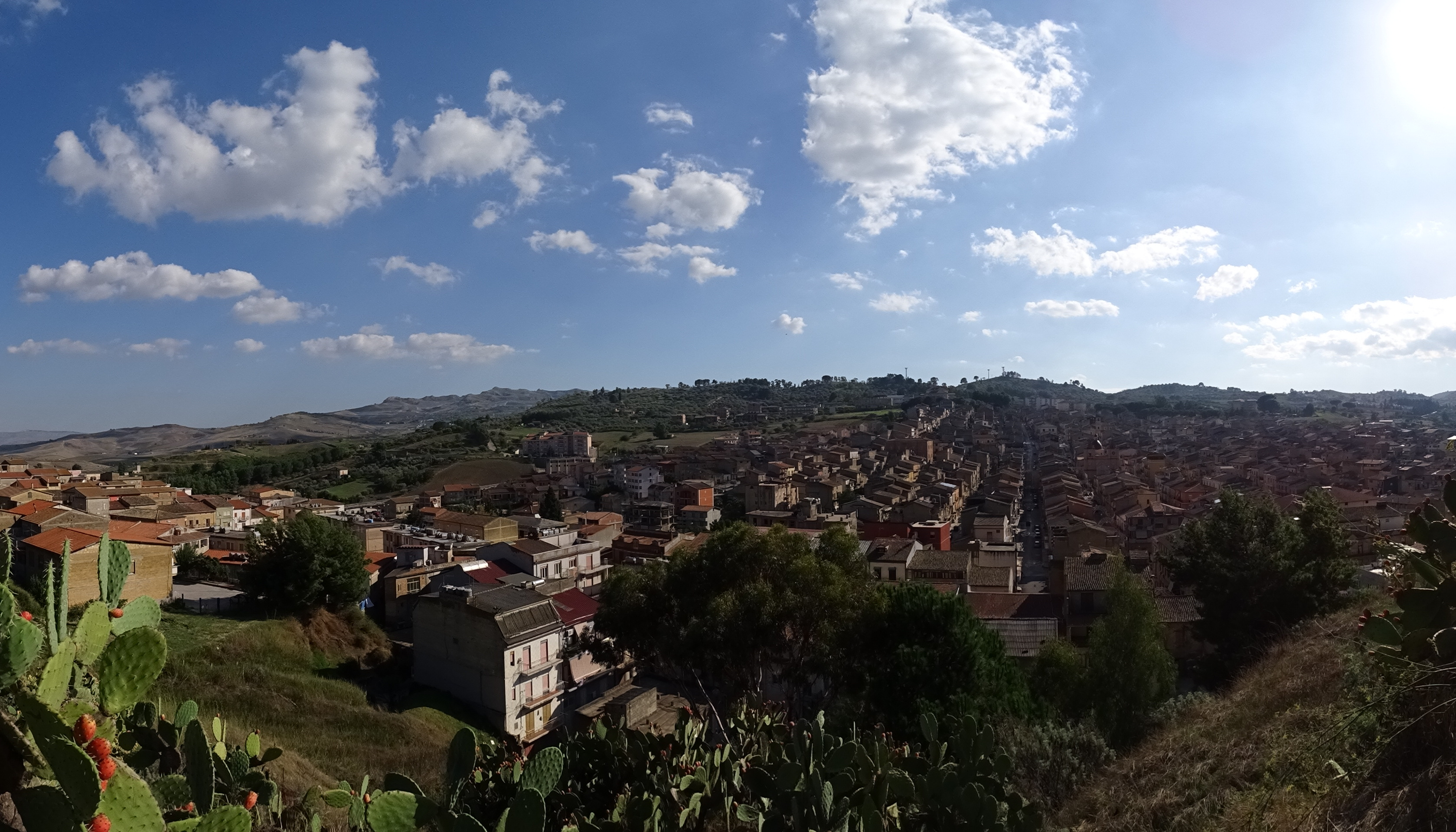

- Location within Italy Location within Sicily
- Coordinates: 37°41′N 13°49′E
- Country: Italy
- Region: Sicily
- Province: Caltanissetta (CL)

Government
  - Mayor: Concettina Nicosia (Special Commissioner)

Area
  - Total: 39.37 km^{2} (15.20 sq mi)
- Elevation: 472 m (1,549 ft)

Population (1-1-2021)
  - Total: 3,238
  - Density: 82.25/km^{2} (213.0/sq mi)
- Demonym: Vallelunghese(i)
- Time zone: UTC+1 (CET)
  - Summer (DST): UTC+2 (CEST)
- Postal code: 93010
- Dialing code: 0934
- Patron saint: St. Mary of Loreto
- Saint day: Fourth Sunday in September
- Website: Official website

Vallelunga Pratameno (Sicilian: Vaddilonga) is a comune (municipality) in the Province of Caltanissetta in the Italian region Sicily, located about 60 kilometres (37 mi) southeast of Palermo and about 30 kilometres (19 mi) northwest of Caltanissetta. Vallelunga Pratameno borders the following municipalities: Cammarata, Castronovo di Sicilia, Polizzi Generosa, Sclafani Bagni, Valledolmo, Villalba.

== Physical Geography ==
Vallelunga Pratameno is the northernmost municipality of the free municipal consortium, situated in a flat valley east of the Platani River. It lies 74 km from Agrigento, 50 km from Caltanissetta, 69 km from Enna, and 98 km from Palermo.

== History ==
Origins

The territory of Vallelunga is assumed to have been inhabited since the Bronze Age. Evidence of this includes the site discovered in the Tanarizzi district, which consists of a tomb containing human remains dating back to the Bronze Age and vessels that are now preserved in the Paolo Orsi Regional Archaeological Museum. In the Casabella area, between the territories of Vallelunga and Villalba, the remains of an ancient urban settlement can be visited. Recently, during modernization works on the Palermo-Catania railway, a Roman villa was discovered in the Manca district. Excavations are still ongoing.

Norman Period

The feudal origin of Vallelunga dates back to the Norman conquest of Sicily led by the Hauteville family. In the second half of the 12th century, Roger II, upon establishing the County of Cammarata for his relative Lucia, incorporated the fief of Vallislonge into it.

From the Sicilian Vespers to the 16th Century

Following the Sicilian Vespers of 1282 and the subsequent redistribution of feudal properties across the island, the fief was assigned to the Valguarnera family. In 1349, the Crown granted the fief to Giovanni Caltagirone, nephew of one of the key figures of the Vespers conspiracy. Upon his death, the territory passed to his cousin Puccio Omodei (or de Homodei), who already owned a seventh part of the fief received as a dowry from his wife. The Omodei family held the barony for four generations until Vincenzo I.

From the Notarbartolos to the Marinos: The Birth of the Village

Following the marriage between Vincenzo I Omodei and a member of the Notarbartolo family of Polizzi (princes of Villanova), the fief remained with the latter house from 1570 to 1621. In that year, Ninfa Notarbartolo (daughter of Vincenzo II) married the nobleman Pietro Marino. The latter paid the 400 ounces required by the Treasury to obtain the licentia populandi, granted on September 3, 1633. The granting of this document initiated the first stable resettlement of the fief and marks the conventional founding date of the inhabited center.

The Era of the Papè Family and the Abolition of Feudalism

The Marino family, who held the barony for three generations, was succeeded by the Palermitan house of Papè, Dukes of Prato Ameno. The Papè family held the barony for seven generations until 1812, the year the Sicilian Constitution was promulgated, marking the formal abolition of feudal rights on the island.

== Monuments and Places of Interest ==
- Mother Church (Chiesa Madre): Dedicated to Saint Mary of Loreto and built in 1634, it houses the statue of the Blessed Virgin Mary, patron saint of the town. Built on a Latin cross plan with three naves, its facade features two bell towers. The present facade exhibits an elegant Neo-Gothic style, the result of a major restoration between 1840 and 1850. Its central nave is surmounted by an octagonal dome and decorated with refined rose windows and gold stucco work dating back to 1838.
- Fountain of Triton (Fontana del Tritone): Located in Piazza Umberto I, its decorative perimeter is surrounded by sculptures depicting sea monsters with wide-open jaws from which jets of water gush. The sculptural work of the cherub (putto) was created by local master sculptor Giovanni Vara.
- Oratory of the Most Divine Sacrament (Oratorio del Divinissimo Sacramento): Erected in 1798, the structure is inextricably linked to the homonymous Confraternity, which holds the distinction of being the oldest in Vallelunga, having been officially established in 1687.
- Church of Our Lady of the Rosary (Chiesa della Madonna del Rosario): Built in 1770.
- "Tomb of Vallelunga": A tomb containing a set of grave goods dating back to the Bronze Age (Castelluccio and Rodì-Tindari-Vallelunga styles), discovered by chance in the municipal territory. Among the main artifacts—now preserved at the Paolo Orsi Regional Archaeological Museum in Syracuse and studied by Luigi Bernabò Brea—are footed vessels and ceramics that demonstrate forms of imitation and cultural exchange among the different stylistic components of prehistoric Sicily.
- The "Pirrera": A Sicilian term historically indicating a stone or building-material quarry, this is a characteristic rocky and naturalistic ridge standing at 577 meters above sea level that represents a fundamental geographical and historical element of the town's identity.
- Museum of Rural Culture (Museo della civiltà contadina): Located at the former "Perez" school complex (named after the Sicilian politician Francesco Paolo Perez), the display offers a true journey through time, made accessible through detailed information sheets and cataloging curated to safeguard the municipality's intangible heritage.
- Roman Villa of the Manca District: A vast residential and agricultural production complex from the Imperial era (1st–5th century AD), discovered during works on the Palermo-Catania railway. The site includes several rectangular buildings used as warehouses, storage facilities for African amphorae containing agricultural produce, and livestock enclosures. The discovery of stamped roof tiles suggests a connection to a figure from the Roman elite of the era.

== Economy ==
Located in the northern part of the free municipal consortium of Caltanissetta, the municipality is rich in traditions, craftsmanship, and agricultural produce: almonds, tomatoes, wheat, grapes, and olives. In ancient times, it was a flourishing center for the production of pottery and brickwork, which has since disappeared.

Hundred of Vallelungesi settled in the cities of Buffalo and Batavia in the US state of New York in the early 20th century, both communities establishing societies dedicated to Our Lady of Loreto, patroness of Vallelunga at the Buffalo and Batavia churches (both named St. Anthony of Padua Church). The annual feast is celebrated on the fourth Sunday of September.
