= Varsallona =

Varsallona is a surname. Notable people with the surname include:

- Francesco Paolo Varsallona, Italian bandit
