= Francesco Paolo Varsallona =

Francesco Paolo Varsallona or Varsalona was a Sicilian bandit who operated on the island around the turn of the 20th century. He is considered to be the last great bandit of the pre-fascist era. He hailed from Castronovo and was the son of a bandit that had belonged to the notorious band of Angelo Pugliese, better known as "Don Peppino il Lombardo", credited with introducing kidnapping people for money in Sicily.

== Outlaw ==
Varsallona became an outlaw in 1893 after he killed a witness in the trial about his brother Luigi Varsallona's murder. His brother, a bandit as well, had been killed in 1892 over a dispute about the booty of his band’s actions. The witness did his best to provide the defendants with an alibi. Varsallona took justice in its own hands and in an act of vendetta killed the witness.

He became a fugitive and his hide-out was in the Cammarata mountains. He assembled a band of fellow fugitives which became involved in robberies and cattle rustling roaming the province of Caltanisetta and the neighbouring areas of the provinces of Palermo and Agrigento.

== Popularity ==
He soon acquired a popular reputation for challenging the law and its agents, according to the New York Times. From his hide-out in the mountains, he “dominated great territories, imposing ransoms which were regularly paid, administering justice according to their own ideas, and living quite secure, as the shepherds and peasants – partly through fear, and partly from satisfaction in that open rebellion against what is the personification of that Government which they have hated for centuries – never let them lack ammunition or food and carefully informed them of every move of the police by signals.”

== Modernizing brigandage ==
Varsallona is credited with modernizing brigandage in Sicily. Instead of bands roving the countryside and abducting people, he introduced tribute payments in return for guaranteed safety for the landlords and their caretakers and lease-holders (gabelotto or bailiff), while freelancing bands were suppressed. He also supplied manpower to noble landowners to repress farmers' revolts. Another innovation was to arrange for his men to be mobilized and demobilized according to the circumstances. They went quietly to a planned operation and then afterwards slipped back to their everyday occupations. The future Sicilian Mafia boss, Calogero Vizzini, enrolled in the band when he was still a young and aspiring criminal. In the decades to come he would be considered to be the "boss of bosses" – although such a position does not exist in the loose structure of Cosa Nostra.

== Capture ==
In 1902, an elaborate search for Varsallona was undertaken by the Carabinieri. During one raid in Cammarata in November, 60 people were arrested, including a Marquis, a Mayor, several doctors and lawyers, but the bandit remained at large. Some 600 persons were jailed charged with hiding Varsalona during several dragnets in the area. Varsallona’s band finally fell into a trap set up by the police and stood trial for "association to commit a crime". Vizzini was one of the few to be acquitted.

According to some sources, Varsallona was a "man of honour" – a member of the Mafia.

== Biography ==
- (in Italian) Cutrera, Antonino (1904). Varsallona, il suo regno e le sue gesta delittuose, Rome
- (in Italian) Lo Scrudato, Vito (2004). L'ultimo brigante. Nel latifondo siciliano tra '800 e '900, Frankfurt: Lang, Peter Lang, ISBN 978-3-631-52387-2
