= Calogero Vizzini =

Sicilian Mafia boss (1877–1954)

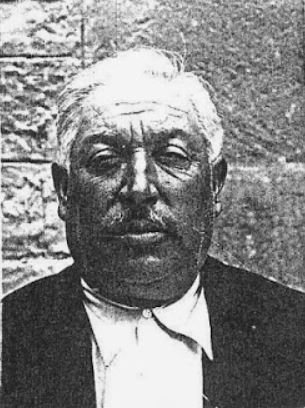
- Vizzini in a 1935 mugshot
- Born: 24 July 1877; Villalba, Sicily, Italy
- Died: 10 July 1954 (aged 76); Villalba, Sicily, Italy
- Other name: Don Calò
- Political party: Movement for the Independence of Sicily; Christian Democracy
- Allegiance: Cosa Nostra

Calogero Vizzini (Italian: [kaˈlɔːdʒero vitˈtsiːni]; 24 July 1877 – 10 July 1954), also commonly known as "Don Calò", was a Sicilian Mafia boss of Villalba in the province of Caltanissetta, Sicily. He was considered to be one of the most influential and legendary Mafia bosses of Sicily after World War II until his death in 1954. In the media, Don Calò was often depicted as the "boss of bosses" – although such a position does not exist in the loose structure of Cosa Nostra.

Vizzini was the archetype of the paternalistic "man of honour" of a rural Mafia that disappeared in the 1960s and 1970s. In those days, a mafioso was seen by some as a social intermediary and a man standing for order and peace. During the first stage of his career, he used violence to establish his position; the second stage of his career saw him limit his use of violence, turn to principally legal sources of income, and exercise his power in an open and legitimate manner.

Vizzini is the central character in the history of direct Mafia support for the Allied Forces during the invasion of Sicily in 1943. After World War II, he became the personification of the reinstatement of Cosa Nostra during the Allied occupation and the subsequent restoration of democracy after the repression under Fascist rule. Initially, he supported the Sicilian Independence Movement, but changed allegiance to the Christian Democrat party, when it became clear that Sicilian independence was unfeasible.

When Vizzini died in 1954, thousands of peasants dressed in black and his funeral was attended by high-ranking mafiosi, politicians, and priests. The funeral epitaph stated, "His 'mafia' was not criminal, but stood for respect of the law, defense of all rights, greatness of character. It was love." His rise to power and persistence in power was nevertheless tied to extortion, violence, and murder. His stature as an all-powerful Mafia boss rose to mythical proportions, but historians from the 1990s onwards have asserted that his magnitude was exaggerated.

== Early years ==
Vizzini was born on 24 July 1877 in Villalba, a village in the province of Caltanissetta, with a population of approximately 4,000 people at the time. This area in the middle of Sicily, known as the "Vallone", was a poor region where most people lived off subsistence agriculture. His father, Beniamino Vizzini, was a peasant who managed to marry into a slightly more well-off family that owned some land. A member of his mother's family, Giuseppe Scarlata, had risen to high eminence in the Catholic Church. Calogero's brothers, Giovanni and Giuseppe (not to be confused with the bishop of Noto of the same name), both became priests in Villalba. Calogero Vizzini, however, was semi-literate and did not finish elementary school.

The Mafia of Villalba was of relatively recent origin, as it did not go back to the 1860s, considered to be the period when the Mafia emerged around Palermo. It started as a form of private protection and has little to do with large estates as was the case in many other rural areas where many mafiosi started as caretakers and lease-holders (gabelloto or bailiff) for absentee landlords.

In the 1890s, some people, including the young Calogero Vizzini, decided to do something about the absence of peace and security in the countryside. The state police at the time was as much a danger as the brigands. The Villalba Mafia thus emerged as an alternative social regime centred on membership in church-sponsored associations that generated considerable social capital. It later transformed into a protection racket, victimizing villagers and landowners alike through violence, intimidation and omertà.

Don Calò once explained how he saw the Mafia when he was interviewed by one of Italy's most famous journalists, Indro Montanelli, for the Corriere della Sera (30 October 1949):

The fact is that, in every society, there has to be a category of people who straighten things out when situations get complicated. Usually, they are functionaries of the state. Where the state is not present, or where it does not have sufficient force, this is done by private individuals.

At one time, Vizzini's criminal dossier included 39 murders, six attempted murders, 13 acts of private violence, 36 robberies, 37 thefts and 63 extortions.

== Early career ==
Vizzini became a cancia, an intermediary between the peasants who wanted their wheat milled into flour and the mills that were located near the coast. Mafiosi who did not tolerate any competition controlled the mills. In the case of Villalba, the mills were some 80 kilometres away. To get the grain safely to the mills over roads infested by bandits was no easy task.

He arranged protection with the bandit Francesco Paolo Varsallona, whose hide-out was in the Cammarata mountains. Varsallona, an alleged "man of honour", also supplied manpower to noble landowners to repress farmers' revolts. Vizzini enrolled in Varsallona's band while conducting his cancia business. Both were arrested in 1902 when Varsallona's band finally fell into a trap set up by the police. Vizzini stood trial with the rest of the band for "association to commit a crime" – but he was one of the few to be acquitted.

The episode had few negative consequences. In 1908, Vizzini was able to acquire a substantial part of the Belici estate when he brokered a deal between the owner, duke Francesco Thomas de Barberin who resided in Paris, and the local rural bank Cassa Rurale, whose president, the priest Scarlata, was Vizzini's uncle. Vizzini held 290 hectares for himself and generously left the rest to the bank to lease out to Catholic peasants.

== World War I and after ==
By 1914, at the outbreak of World War I, Vizzini was the undisputed head of the Mafia in Villalba. The war provided the mafiosi with new opportunities for self-enrichment when the Italian Army requisitioned horses and mules in Sicily for the cavalry and artillery. Vizzini came to an agreement with the Army Commission to delegate the responsibilities to him. He collected a poll tax on the animals whose owners wanted to avoid requisition. He was also the broker for animals that were rustled for the occasion, buying at a low price from the rustlers and selling at market prices to the Army.

However, too many horses and mules died of diseases or old age before they even reached the battlefield and the army ordered an inquiry. In 1917, Vizzini was sentenced to 20 years in the first instance for fraud, corruption and murder, but he was absolved thanks to powerful friends who exonerated him. He made his fortune on the black market during World War I, and expanded his activities to the sulphur mines. As a representative of a consortium of sulphur mine operators, Vizzini participated in high-level meetings in Rome and London concerning government subsidies and tariffs, next to such men as Guido Donegani of Montecatini chemical industries and Guido Jung, Finance minister during Benito Mussolini's fascist regime.

Don Calò further established his fortune in 1922 when he led disgruntled peasants who grabbed land from the aristocratic absentee landlords. Vizzini bought three estates in the Villalba region; he divided them up and handed them over – allegedly without making a penny, according to some – to a cooperative he had founded. According to a local villager, although every peasant got a plot, Don Calò kept more than 12,000 acres (49 km^{2}) for himself.

At the time, according to German sociologist Henner Hess, Vizzini could easily have had himself elected as a parliamentary deputy. Nevertheless, he preferred to remain in the background and instead advise voters and elected officials, playing the role of benevolent benefactor, strengthening his clientele and prestige. He was present at a dinner in July 1922 with the future ruler of Italy, Benito Mussolini, in Milan and supported the March on Rome by Mussolini in October 1922, financing the column that marched from Sicily.

The authorities, however, had him listed as a dangerous criminal. A 1926 police report described Vizzini as a "dangerous cattle rustler, the Mafia boss of the province linked with cattle rustlers and Mafiosi of other provinces." With the rise of Mussolini and Fascist rule, Vizzini's fortunes changed. Mussolini did not tolerate a rival power on Sicily. He appointed Cesare Mori as the prefect of Palermo and granted special powers to persecute the Mafia. Vizzini claimed to have been incarcerated by Mori, but there are no historical records. Don Calò was tried and acquitted on 8 January 1931. However, the police decided to send him to the confinement in Basilicata. He returned to Villalba in 1937 and no one dared to persecute him anymore. Despite the confinement, he was seen regularly in Villalba and Caltanissetta and not being blatantly fascist, he lived his life in peace.

== Alleged support for Allied invasion of Sicily ==
A Sherman tank moves past Sicily's rugged terrain. (National Archives)

In July 1943, Calogero Vizzini allegedly helped the American army during the invasion of Sicily during World War II (Operation Husky). In the US, the Office of Naval Intelligence (ONI) had recruited mafia support to protect the New York City waterfront from Axis powers sabotage since the US had entered the war in December 1941. The ONI collaborated with Lucky Luciano and his partner Meyer Lansky, a Jewish mobster, in what was called Operation Underworld. The resulting Mafia contacts were also used by the US Office of Strategic Services (OSS) – the wartime predecessor of the Central Intelligence Agency (CIA) – during the invasion of Sicily. Later, the alliance was maintained in order to check the growing strength of the Italian Communist Party on the island.

Popular myth has it that a US Army airplane had flown over Villalba on the day of the invasion and dropped a yellow silk foulard marked with a black L (indicating Luciano). Three US tanks drove into Villalba two days later after a journey of about 50 kilometres through enemy occupied territory. Vizzini then allegedly climbed aboard and drove for six days through western Sicily in support of the advancing US troops of General Patton's Third Division. This would have made it clear to the locals that the Americans depended on the Mafia, who navigated the advancing troops through the intricate mountain terrain and protected the roads from snipers while providing an enthusiastic welcome to the liberators.

This account of Vizzini and the legend of Luciano's foulard was first published by the journalist Michele Pantaleone, a native of the village of Villalba, in the newspaper L'Ora in October 1958 (and later republished in his 1962 book Mafia e politica, that was translated in English and published as Mafia and Politics in 1966). However, this version was already refuted in 1963 by another Mafia boss, Nick Gentile, who had approached the journalist Felice Chilanti to write his memoirs. Chilanti agreed and interviewed Gentile for L'Ora. According to Gentile, who also worked for the Allied Military Government of Occupied Territories (AMGOT):

This is a fairy tale taken from thin air and accepted for various reasons. The Allied commands themselves already had several intelligence agencies and the fairy tale that these gangsters and Mafia bosses suddenly became fighters in the service of the U.S. Navy or democracy was endorsed, tacitly even by those who actually carried out these activities, but preferred to give credit to 'mafiosi' and ex-gangsters. And of course, certain Mafia bosses gladly took the credit because they thought they would get something good out of it. I can say with certainty that the story of the U.S. tank arriving in Villalba with a foulard sent by Lucky Luciano to Mafia chief Calogero Vizzini is a fanciful fabrication.

According to Gentile, Vizzini may have had relations with some American officers, but the reasons for those contacts did not concern the war. According to his version, the Mafia chiefs served to "organise certain illicit contraband trades, certain affairs that could be defined as an Allied military sub-government. And nothing else".

While mafiosi supported the US Army, recent research has led most serious historians to dismiss the legend of Luciano's foulard. Vizzini was unknown in other parts of Sicily at the time and had no overall power since Prefect Mori's operations had disconnected the network of the Mafia. According to historian Salvatore Lupo:

The story about the Mafia supporting the Anglo-Americans with the invasion in Sicily is just a legend without any foundation, on the contrary, there are British and American documents about the preparation of the invasion that refute this conjecture; the military power of the Allies was such that they did not need to use such measures.

Historian Tim Newark unraveled the myth in his book Mafia Allies. A version that is probably closer to the truth is that Vizzini simply led a delegation of locals to meet an Allied patrol whose commander had asked to speak to whoever was in charge. He quotes local historian, Luigi Lumia, who described how a procession of people with Calogero Vizzini at the helm made its way towards the tanks chanting: 'Long Live America', 'Long Live the Mafia', 'Long Live Don Calo'. Vizzini was taken to a command post outside Villalba and was interrogated about a recent firefight involving an American jeep on patrol. When Vizzini made it clear that the Italian soldiers had fled and the firefight had been caused by exploding ammunition, the frustrated US army official took his rage out in a stream of obscenities. Vizzini was utterly embarrassed by the incident and ordered his interpreter not to tell anybody what had happened.

== Mayor of Villalba ==
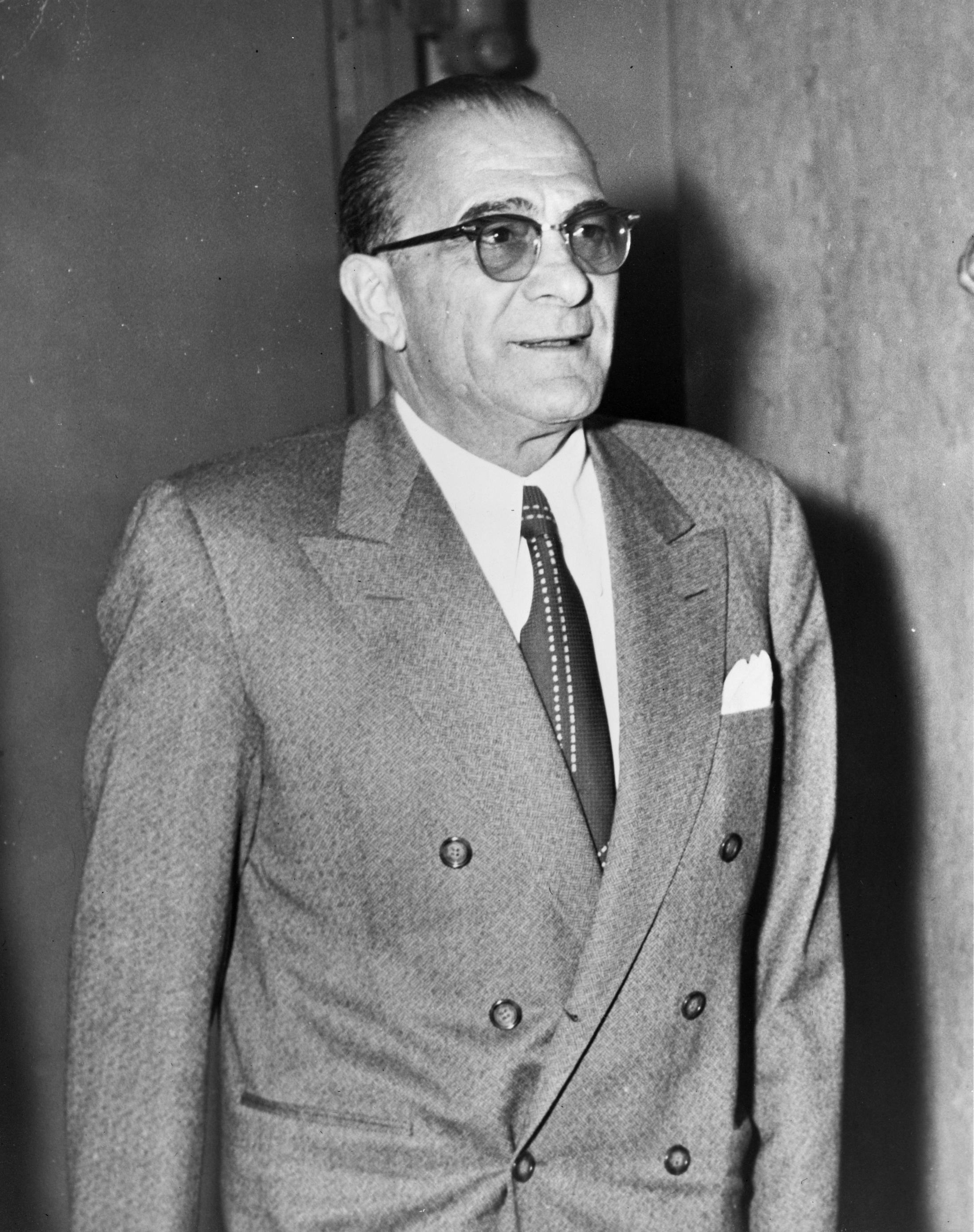
Vito Genovese

The Mafia only became credible again after the end of the invasion. The Allied Military Government of Occupied Territories (AMGOT), looking for anti-fascist notables to replace fascist authorities, made Don Calogero Vizzini mayor of Villalba, as well as an Honorary Colonel of the US Army. In the chaos that followed the invasion of Sicily and the collapse of Fascism, the American army often relied on senior churchmen for advice on whom to trust. Don Calò was one of those recommended. He had a long record of involvement with Catholic social funds and there were several clergymen in his family.

A witness at the time described the appointment of Vizzini: "When Don Calò Vizzini was made mayor of the town, almost the entire population was assembled in the square. Speaking in poor Italian, this American lieutenant said, 'This is your master'." According to Vizzini's own account, he was carried shoulder high through Villalba on the day that he took office as mayor. He claimed to have acted as a peacemaker; only his intervention saved his Fascist predecessor from being lynched.

Michele Pantaleone, who first reported the legend of Luciano's foulard, witnessed the revival of the Mafia in his native village of Villalba and described the negative effects of AMGOT's policies:

By the beginning of the Second World War, the Mafia was restricted to a few isolated and scattered groups and could have been completely wiped out if the social problems of the island had been dealt with ... the Allied occupation and the subsequent slow restoration of democracy reinstated the Mafia with its full powers, put it once more on the way to becoming a political force, and returned to the Onorata Societa the weapons which Fascism had snatched from it.

The Americans authorities apparently appreciated Vizzini, because he had opposed the Fascists and yielded substantial political power on the island. As far as Vizzini was concerned, he liked to boast about his excellent contacts with the Americans, and underlined their support for the separatist movement. Vizzini would become an important player in the midst of the separatist crisis later on. The Americans seem to have treated Vizzini as the Mafia's overall boss. The OSS relied on the Mafia, and in particular on Vizzini, for its intelligence. His codename was 'Bull Frog' in secret communications. For a while, the chief of the OSS Palermo office, Joseph Russo, met him and other Mafia bosses 'at least once a month'.

== King of the black market ==
Because of his excellent connections, Vizzini also became the 'king' of the rampant post-war black market and arranged to get Villalba's overly inquisitive police chief killed. AMGOT relied on mafiosi who were considered staunch anti-fascists because of the repression under Benito Mussolini. Many other mafiosi, such as Giuseppe Genco Russo, were appointed as mayors of their own hometowns. Coordinating the AMGOT effort was the former lieutenant-governor of New York, Colonel Charles Poletti, whom Luciano once described as "one of our good friends."

A peasant told the social activist Danilo Dolci in the 1950s how the situation was in Villalba after the Americans had landed: the Mafia "robbed the storehouses of the agrarian Co-op and the army's storehouses; sold food, clothes, cars and lorries in Palermo on the black market. In Villalba, all power was in their hands: church, Mafia, agricultural banks, latifundia, all in the hands of the same family ... One used to go and see him and ask 'Can you do me this favour?' even for a little affair one had with some other person."'

With American gangster Vito Genovese, who had fled to Italy in 1937 accused of murder, Vizzini organised one of the largest black market operations in southern Italy. Truck convoys with the basic foodstuffs needed for the Italian dietary needs were sent to hunger-strapped Naples where the shipments were further distributed by Genovese's organisation, which was facilitated by the fact that Genovese held a post with the Allied Command in the town of Nola in the metropolitan area of Naples. The trucks were given transit passes and export papers through the AMGOT administration in Naples and Sicily, while several corrupted US army officers furnished the petrol and trucks for the operation. According to Luke Monzelli, a lieutenant in the Carabinieri assigned to follow Genovese during his time in Italy: "Truckloads of food supplies were shipped from Vizzini to Genovese — all accompanied by the proper documents which had been certified by men in authority, Mafia members in the service of Vizzini and Genovese."

== Supporting Sicilian independence ==
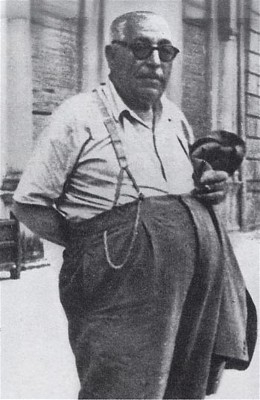
"Don Calò used to walk around in shirtsleeves and overalls. His slovenly dress and laconic speech were typical Mafia affectations. It was not done for a Mafia chieftain to show off in the matter of his clothing or any other way, and sometimes, as in Don Calò's case, this lack of concern for appearances was carried to extremes." – Norman Lewis

Vizzini initially supported the separatist movement in Sicily. On 6 December 1943, Vizzini participated in the first clandestine regional convention of the Sicilian separatists movement of the Sicilian Independence Movement (Movimento Indipendentista Siciliano – MIS) in Catania. Other prominent Mafia bosses like Giuseppe Genco Russo, Gaetano Filippone, Michele Navarra and Francesco Paolo Bontade did not hide their sympathies for the separatists either. The separatists benefited from covert support of the OSS to contain the leftward drift in 1943–1944 in Italy. The US became increasingly concerned about the future prospects in Italy. The strategic location of the island and it's naval bases in the Mediterranean provided an essential counterbalance to a potential communist takeover on the Italian mainland. Membership of the Italian Communist Party had doubled and the largely left inspired resistance movement in the north was gathering strength.

On 9 December 1943, the central committee of the separatist movement held a secret meeting in Palermo. Vizzini's presence suggested the Mafia's support for independence, and aided the conservative wing in their attempt to control the movement. Vizzini shared common views with baron Lucio Tasca – one of the more important leaders of the movement – and despite protests by the more progressive wing, Vizzini remained at the meeting representing the province of Caltanissetta.

Later, Vizzini represented the Fronte Democratico d'Ordine Siciliano, a satellite political organization of the separatist movement. The Fronte Democratico demonstrated the Mafia's hesitation to fully commit to the MIS. The Fronte was popular on the island and advocated independence of Sicily under American influence. Although the Americans strongly emphasized that the United States did not want Sicily as the 49th state, in late 1944, some claimed that the Fronte's ideas were the result of American propaganda that had encouraged separatism prior to the invasion. Fronte leaders spread rumours that they had the backing and protection of the United States. Many of its members were "lieutenants in the high Mafia" and Vizzini was considered its leader.

Declassified secret dispatches from the US consul in Palermo, Alfred T. Nester, to the United States Department of State show Vizzini's involvement in the separatist movement and covert support from Italian army officials. Nester had good ties with leading mafiosi. General Giuseppe Castellano – who negotiated the 1943 Armistice with Italy – and Vizzini met with Trapani politician Virgilio Nasi to offer him the leadership of a movement for Sicilian autonomy with the support of the Mafia. The plan was to stage Nasi as a candidate for High Commissioner for Sicily to oppose the favourite, the Christian Democrat Salvatore Aldisio.

Castellano became convinced that the Mafia was the strongest political and social force in Sicily to be reckoned with. He started to establish cordial relations with Mafia leaders. The general believed that law and order could be restored if "the system formerly employed by the old and respected Maf(f)ia should return to the Sicilian scene". Castellano made contacts with Mafia leaders and met with them several times. He gained the cooperation of Vizzini, who had supported separatism but was now prepared for a change in the island's political situation in the direction of regional autonomy.

== Shifting to the Christian Democrats ==
Most mafiosi soon changed sides, joining the Christian Democrat party (Democrazia Cristiana – DC) when it became clear that an independent Sicily was not feasible and the OSS quietly dropped support for the separatist movement in 1945 and turned to the DC. Bernardo Mattarella, one of the party's leaders, approached Vizzini to abandon the separatists and join the Christian Democrats. He welcomed Vizzini's joining the DC in an article in the Catholic newspaper Il Popolo in 1945.

Vizzini offered to meet with Aldisio – who had been appointed High Commissioner in August 1944 – to solve the island's grain problem, implying he had the power to do so. There is no evidence that Aldisio and Vizzini ever met to discuss the issue. Aldiso did, however, invite Calogero Volpe, a fellow Christian Democrat and Mafia member befriended by Vizzini, to secret gatherings with Christian Democrats. The meetings were seen as a first step in a government alliance with the Mafia. Aldisio's appointment was perceived by Mafia chieftains as a first indication of the government's determination to subdue the separatist movement. They were now forced to reconsider their support.

Vizzini's support for the DC was not a secret. During the crucial 1948 elections that would decide on Italy's post-war future, Vizzini and Genco Russo sat at the same table with leading DC politicians, attending an electoral lunch. In the course of the start of the Cold War, the 1948 elections were a triumph for the Christian Democrats, who would govern Italy with ups and downs for the next 45 years in different coalitions. One of its main aims was to keep the Italian Communist Party – the biggest communist party in a NATO member state – away from power.

== Villalba incident ==
Girolamo Li Causi addressing a commemorative meeting in Portella della Ginestra.

Vizzini, a staunch anti-Communist who opposed the fight for the land of Sicilian peasants, organised his own peasant cooperatives in his area during both post-war periods, through which he deflected the appeal of the left-wing parties, maintained his hold over the peasants, and guaranteed his own continued access to the land. He was in a fierce dispute over the lease of the large estate Miccichè of the Trabia family in Palermo, with a peasant cooperative headed by Michele Pantaleone who had founded the Italian Socialist Party (Partito Socialista Italiano – PSI) in Villalba. Vizzini had tried hard to persuade Pantaleone to marry his niece, but failed. Pantaleone used his leverage with the left-wing press. In return, Don Calò arranged for the crops on the Pantaleone family's land to be vandalized. There was even a failed attempt on Pantaleone's life.

On 16 September 1944, leaders of the Blocco del popolo (Popular Front) in Sicily, the communist Girolamo Li Causi and Pantaleone, went to speak to the landless labourers at a rally in Villalba, challenging Don Calò in his own personal fiefdom. In the morning, tensions rose when Christian Democrat mayor Beniamino Farina – a relative of Vizzini as well as his successor as mayor – angered local communists by ordering all hammer-and-sickle signs erased from buildings along the road on which Li Causi would travel into town. When his supporters protested, they were intimidated by separatists and thugs.

The rally began in the late afternoon. Vizzini had agreed to permit the meeting as long as land problems, the large estates, or the Mafia were not addressed. Both speakers who preceded Li Causi, among which was Pantaleone, followed Vizzini's commands. Li Causi did not. He denounced the unjust exploitation by the Mafia, and when Li Causi started to talk about how the peasants were being deceived by 'a powerful leaseholder' – a thinly disguised reference to Vizzini – the Mafia boss hurled: It is a lie. Pandemonium broke out. The rally ended in a shoot-out which left 14 people wounded including Li Causi and Pantaleone. Six months later Vizzini acquired the lease for the Miccichè estate.

According to Vizzini's own account, La Verità sui Fatti di Villalba (The Truth About the Events in Villalba) that appeared in separatist newspapers, it had been the Communist who had started the shooting. When Pantaleone and Li Causi had arrived in the town, they asked Vizzini if they were in hostile territory and whether their meeting might be disturbed. Vizzini "assured them that they were free to hold their meeting without any fear of disturbance if they were careful enough not to speak on local matters". Vizzini admitted that he interrupted Li Causi, but denied that he had ignited the violence. The Carabinieri quickly restored order and arrested eight people, including the mayor. Several others, including Vizzini, evaded the police dragnet. Sixty persons were interrogated, but the investigation was doomed from the start. (Don Calò and his bodyguard were accused of attempted manslaughter. The trial dragged on until 1958, but by 1946 the evidence had already disappeared. Vizzini was never convicted because by the time of the verdict, he was already dead.)

The Villalba attack inaugurated a long series of Mafia attacks in Sicily on political activists, trade union leaders and ordinary peasants resisting Mafia rule. In the following years, many left-wing leaders were killed or otherwise attacked, culminating in the killing of 11 people and the wounding of over thirty at a 1 May labour parade in Portella della Ginestra. The Portella della Ginestra massacre was attributed to the bandit and separatist leader Salvatore Giuliano. Nevertheless, the Mafia was suspected of involvement in the bloodbath and many other attacks on left-wing organisations and leaders.

== Links to American gangsters ==
In 1949, Vizzini and Italian-American crime boss Lucky Luciano set up a candy factory in Palermo exporting products all over Europe and to the US. Police suspected that it was a cover for heroin trafficking. The laboratory operated undisturbed until 11 April 1954, when the Rome-based daily newspaper Avanti! published an article with a photograph of the factory under the headline "Textiles and Sweets on the Drug Route". The same evening the factory was closed, and the laboratory's chemists had left the country.

In 1950, Lucky Luciano was photographed in front of the Hotel Sole in the centre of old Palermo, frequently the residence of Don Calò Vizzini, talking with Don Calò's bodyguards. The photographer was beaten up, but he never reported the fact to the authorities after receiving an expensive new camera and cash. Vizzini's network reached the United States where he knew the future family boss Angelo Annaloro of Philadelphia, known as Angelo Bruno, who was born in Villalba.

== "Boss of bosses" ==
"He always wore tinted spectacles, as you can see on photographs. And behind these spectacles, his eyes were half closed, as if he was slumbering. His mouth was always open, with his lower lip hanging out. He looked dim-witted, for those who did not know him." – Luigi Lumia

In the media, Vizzini was often depicted as the "boss of bosses" – although such a position did not exist in the loose structure of Cosa Nostra, and later Mafia turncoats denied that he ever was the boss of the Mafia in Sicily. According to the pentito Tommaso Buscetta, the title capo dei capi or "boss of bosses" did not exist in Cosa Nostra. According to historian John Dickie, "the question is if Vizzini was as dominant in the Mafia as he was famous outside it." In the matter of Mafia support for the separatist movement, other Cosa Nostra bosses sidelined Vizzini, who was considered to be tainted by his association with radical separatist leaders Andrea Finocchiaro Aprile and Lucio Tasca. These bosses wanted nothing to do with either the island's bandits or EVIS, to which Vizzini and Lucio Tasca were suspected to be connected. According to the pentito Antonio Calderone Vizzini never had been the boss of Cosa Nostra of Sicily. His regular appearances and interviews in the media were frowned upon within the Mafia.

Nevertheless, Vizzini wielded considerable power. The Italian journalist Luigi Barzini, who claimed to know Vizzini well, described his stature and daily life in Villalba in his book The Italians:

From the shadows along the walls and narrow side streets emerged people who had arrived earlier, some from far away, and were waiting to talk to him. They were peasants, old women with black veils on their head, young mafiosi, middle-class men. They all walked along with him in turn, explaining their problems. He listened, then called one of his henchmen, gave a few orders, and summoned the next petitioner. Many kissed his hand in gratitude as they left.

Vizzini's generous and protective manner, the deferential greetings of passers-by, the meekness of those approaching him, and the smiles of gratefulness when he spoke to them, reminded Barzini of a primeval scene: a prince holding court and handing out justice publicly. However, Barzini also concluded, "[o]f course, the many victims of his reign were not visible, the many corpses found riddled with bullets in the countryside during more than half a century, the widows weeping, the fatherless orphans."

The former mayor of Villalba and local historian, Luigi Lumia, remembers Don Calò walking the streets of Villalba:

He was squat with skinny legs and a protruding stomach. He always wore tinted spectacles, as you can see on photographs. And behind these spectacles, his eyes were half closed, as if he was slumbering. His mouth was always open, with his lower lip hanging out. He looked dim-witted, for those who did not know him.

His power was not restricted to just his hometown but reached the high offices on Sicily as well. According to Indro Montanelli, Vizzini could easily call the regional president, the prefect, the cardinal-archbishop of Palermo and any parliamentary deputy or mayor of Sicily whenever he felt like it. Lumia maintains that Vizzini never explicitly ordered someone to kill somebody.

He always tried to 'accommodate' matters and bring people to reason, that is to say, in the way he had decided how people and things should be. If someone remained headstrong nonetheless ... with a gesture, a nod, he left it to his friends to take care of the problem. Every now and then, he intervened: 'But who made him do it?', 'Who knows what end he will find'.

== Death ==
Vizzini's funeral in Villalba.

Don Calò Vizzini died on 10 July 1954, at the age of 76, while entering Villalba in an ambulance that was transporting him home from a clinic in Palermo. Thousands of peasants dressed in black and politicians and priests took part in his funeral, including Mussomeli boss Giuseppe Genco Russo and the powerful boss Don Francesco Paolo Bontade from Palermo (the father of future Mafia boss Stefano Bontade) – who was one of the pallbearers. Even The New York Times reported the news of the death of this local Mafia chief.

Villalba's public offices and the Christian Democratic headquarters closed for a week in mourning. An elegy for Vizzini was pinned to the church door. It read:

Humble with the humble. Great with the great. He showed with words and deeds that his Mafia was not criminal. It stood for respect for the law, defence of all rights, greatness of character: it was love.

He left approximately two billion lire (about US$320,000 at the exchange rate at the time) worth of sulphur, land, houses and varied investments. According to other sources, he left a patrimony of a billion Italian lire (about US$160,000) to his grandsons, the sons of his sister, including sulphur mines in Gessolungo, land-holdings and a mansion in the centre of Villalba. Don Calò had remained unmarried after a love affair at the age of 20 with a local girl, Concettina. However, her parents lived in the United States and brought her over, and Vizzini did not want to leave his native Villalba.

== Legacy ==
"His 'mafia' was not criminal, but stood for respect of the law, defense of all rights, greatness of character. It was love." – The epitaph for Calogero Vizzini.

Although Vizzini throughout his lifetime acquired extensive land holdings, the Mafia historian Salvatore Lupo considers him to be the undertaker of the large feudal estates rather than the protector of that system. Vizzini did also make sure that local peasants (in particular the ones organised in Catholic cooperatives) got their share of land, once he had secured his cut. When land-reform was finally enacted in 1950, mafiosi like Vizzini were in a position to perform their traditional role of brokerage between the peasants, the landlords, and the state. They were able to exploit the intense land-hunger of the peasants, gain concessions from the landlords in return for limiting the impact of the reform, and make substantial profits from their mediation in land sales.

Don Calò Vizzini was the archetype of the paternalistic "man of honour" of a bygone age, that of a rural and semi-feudal Sicily that existed until the 1960s, where a mafioso was seen by some as a social intermediary and a man standing for order and peace. In the first stage of his career, he used violence to establish his position, but in the second phase, he limited recourse to violence, turned to principally legal sources of income, and exercised his power in an open and legitimate manner.

He represented a Mafia that controlled power and did not let power control them, according to German sociologist Henner Hess. To make a good impression, or fare figura, is important: "they enjoy the respect shown them, they enjoy power, but they do not wish to give rise to its discussion. They know very well that behind the veil of modesty, power is felt to be all the more uncanny." Italian journalist Indro Montanelli quoted a typical remark by Don Calò:

A photograph of me? Whatever for? I am no-one. I am just a citizen. ... It is strange ... People think that I don't talk much from modesty. No. I don't talk much because I don't know much. I live in a village, I do only rarely go to Palermo, I know few people ...

"When I die, the Mafia dies", Vizzini did once tell Montanelli. However, with the death of Vizzini, his old-fashioned traditional rural Mafia slowly passed away to be replaced with a more modern, often urban version of gangsterism involved in cigarette smuggling, drug trafficking and laundering their proceeds in construction and real-estate development. While still alive, and after his death, Vizzini's stature as an all-powerful Mafia boss rose to mythical proportions. Since the 1990s, historians have moderated his magnitude.

== Sources ==
- Arlacchi, Pino (1988). Mafia Business. The Mafia ethic and the spirit of capitalism, Oxford: Oxford University Press ISBN 0-19-285197-7
- Arlacchi, Pino (1993). Men of Dishonor: Inside the Sicilian Mafia, New York: Morrow ISBN 0-688-04574-X
- (in Italian) Arlacchi, Pino (1994). Addio Cosa nostra: La vita di Tommaso Buscetta, Milan: Rizzoli ISBN 88-17-84299-0
- (in Italian) Badolati, Arcangelo & Stefano Dodaro (1985). Il Mammasantissima. La strage di Villalba e il processo calabrese a Calogero Vizzini, Cosenza: Pellegrini Editore, ISBN 88-8101-292-8
- Barzini, Luigi (1964/1968). The Italians, London: Penguin Books ISBN 0-14-014595-8 (originally published in 1964)
- (in Italian) Caruso, Alfio (2000). Da cosa nasce cosa: storia della mafia dal 1943 a oggi, Milan: Longanesi ISBN 88-304-1620-7
- Chubb, Judith (1989). The Mafia and Politics, Cornell Studies in International Affairs, Occasional Papers No. 23.
- Dickie, John (2004). Cosa Nostra. A history of the Sicilian Mafia, London: Hodder & Stoughton, ISBN 0-340-82435-2
- Dovizio, Ciro (2019). "Verità o falsificazione? Gli Alleati e la mafia sulle pagine dell'Ora (1958-1963)" [Truth or falsification?The Allies and the mafia on the pages of L’Ora (1958-1963)]. Biblos (in Italian). 5 (3). Revista da Faculdade de Letras da Universidade de Coimbra: 105–123. doi:10.14195/0870-411. ISSN 0870-4112.
- Finkelstein, Monte S. (1998). Separatism, the Allies and the Mafia: The Struggle for Sicilian Independence, 1943–1948, Bethlehem (Pennsylvania): Lehigh University Press ISBN 0-934223-51-3
- Hess, Henner (1998). Mafia & Mafiosi: Origin, Power, and Myth, London: Hurst & Co Publishers, ISBN 1-85065-500-6 (Review)
- Jamieson, Alison (2000). The Antimafia: Italy's fight against organized crime, London: Macmillan, ISBN 0-333-80158-X.
- Lewis, Norman (1964/1967). The Honoured Society: The Sicilian Mafia Observed, Harmondsworth: Penguin Books.
- Lupo, Salvatore (2009). History of the Mafia, New York: Columbia University Press, ISBN 978-0-231-13134-6
- (in Italian) Manica, Giustina (2010). Mafia e politica tra fascismo e postfascismo: Realtà siciliana e collegamenti internazionali 1924–1948, Manduria-Bari-Roma: Piero Lacaita Editore
- McCoy, Alfred W. (1972/1991), The Politics of Heroin in Southeast Asia. CIA complicity in the global drug trade, Lawrence Hill Books ISBN 1-55652-125-1
- Newark, Tim (2007/2012). The Mafia at War: Allied Collusion with the Mob, London: Greenhill Books, ISBN 978-1-85367-672-7 (Review)
- Pantaleone, Michele (1966). Mafia and Politics, New York: Coward-McCann ISBN 978-0701110048
- Paoli, Letizia (2003). Mafia Brotherhoods: Organized Crime, Italian Style, Oxford/New York: Oxford University Press ISBN 0-19-515724-9
- Sabetti, Filippo (1984/2002). Village Politics and the Mafia in Sicily, Montreal: McGill-Queens University Press 2002 (First published in 1984 as Political Authority in a Sicilian Village, New Brunswick (NJ): Rutgers University Press) (Review)
- Servadio, Gaia (1976), Mafioso. A history of the Mafia from its origins to the present day, London: Secker & Warburg ISBN 0-436-44700-2
- Sterling, Claire (1990). Octopus. How the long reach of the Sicilian Mafia controls the global narcotics trade, New York: Simon & Schuster, ISBN 0-671-73402-4.
