= Portella della Ginestra massacre =

1947 mass killing by Sicilian separatists in Sicily, Italy

- Mural of the Portella della Ginestra massacre
- Location: 37°58′34″N 13°15′22″E; In the municipality of Piana degli Albanesi at the top of the pass leading to San Giuseppe Jato
- Date: 1 May 1947; 79 years ago 10:15
- Target: May Day celebrations of communist Sicilian peasants
- Attack type: Mass shooting, massacre
- Deaths: 11
- Injuries: 27
- Perpetrators: Salvatore Giuliano and band of Sicilian separatists
- Motive: Intimidation of peasant movement and their drive for land reform in the context of a campaign against the Italian Communist Party after a surprising victory in the 1947 Sicilian regional election

The Portella della Ginestra massacre refers to the killing of 11 people and wounding of 27 others during May Day celebrations in Sicily on 1 May 1947, in the municipality of Piana degli Albanesi. Those held responsible were the bandit and separatist leader Salvatore Giuliano and his gang, although their motives and intentions are still a matter of controversy.

== Preceding events ==
From May 1893, during the period of the Fasci Siciliani, the peasants of the neighbouring towns of Piana degli Albanesi, San Giuseppe Jato and San Cipirello used to gather at Portella della Ginestra for the Labour Day celebrations at the initiative of the physician and peasant leader Nicola Barbato, who used to speak to the crowd from a big rock that was later called "Barbato's Stone". The tradition was interrupted during the Fascist period and resumed after the fall of the Fascist regime.

The massacre took place twelve days after a surprise victory by the People's Block (Blocco del popolo) – a coalition of the Italian Communist Party (Partito Comunista Italiano, PCI) and the Italian Socialist Party (Partito Socialista Italiano, PSI) – in the elections for the Constituent Assembly of the autonomous region of Sicily on 20–21 April 1947. The People's Block obtained 29.13 per cent of the vote, while the Christian Democrat Party got 20.52% and the Common Man's Front and Monarchist National Party came third and fourth.

With national elections set for October 1947, the leftist victory in Sicily created speculation that a coalition led by Palmiro Togliatti might bring Italy under communist rule. In Sicily, the leader of the Sicilian branch of the communists, Girolamo Li Causi, pledged to redistribute large land holdings, but to preserve any-sized 100 hectares (247 acres) or less.

== The massacre ==
On 1 May 1947, hundreds of mostly poor peasants gathered at Portella della Ginestra, three kilometres from the town of Piana degli Albanesi on the way to San Giuseppe Jato for the traditional international Labour Day parade. At 10:15, the Communist party secretary from Piana degli Albanesi began to address the crowd when gunfire broke out. It was later determined that machine guns had been fired from the surrounding hills, as well as by men on horseback. Eleven people were killed, including four children, Serafino Lascari (15), Giovanni Grifò (12), Giuseppe Di Maggio (13) and Vincenza La Fata (8). Twenty-seven people were wounded, including a little girl who had her jaw shot off.

The attack was attributed to the bandit and separatist leader Salvatore Giuliano. His aim had been to punish local leftists for the recent election results. In an open letter, he took sole responsibility for the murders and claimed that he had only wanted his men to fire above the heads of the crowd; the deaths had been a mistake.

Until the massacre, Giuliano had been regarded by many as a modern-day Robin Hood who stole from (and even kidnapped) wealthy Sicilians to help the impoverished Sicilians. The shooting of children and peasants at Ginestra, however, outraged his former admirers, and a bounty of three million lire ($13,200 in 1947, $150,000 in 2019) was offered by the Italian government for Giuliano's capture.

The massacre created a national scandal. The Communist-controlled Italian General Confederation of Labour called a general strike in protest against the massacre. According to newspaper reports hints at the possibility of civil war were heard as Communist leaders harangued meetings of 6,000,000 workers who struck throughout Italy in protest against the May Day massacre in Sicily.

The Minister of the Interior, the Christian Democrat Mario Scelba, reported to Parliament the next day that so far as the police could determine, the Portella della Ginestra shooting was non-political. Bandits notoriously infested the valley in which it occurred, said Scelba. Li Causi disagreed and charged that the Mafia had perpetrated the attack, in cahoots with the large landowners, monarchists and the rightist Common Man's Front. The debate ended in a fist fight between the left and the right. Nearly 200 deputies took part in the brawl.

== The victims ==
- Margherita Clesceri (37 years old)
- Giorgio Cusenza (42)
- Giovanni Megna (18)
- Francesco Vicari (22)
- Vito Allotta (19)
- Serafino Lascari (15)
- Filippo Di Salvo (48)
- Giuseppe Di Maggio (13)
- Castrense Intravaia (18)
- Giovanni Grifò (12)
- Vincenza La Fata (8)

== Denouncing the massacre ==
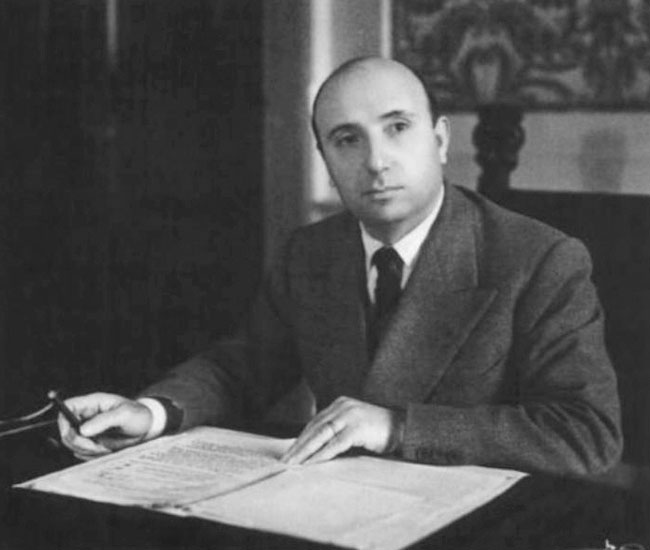
Interior Minister Mario Scelba in 1947

Li Causi and Scelba would be the main opponents in the aftermath of the massacre and the successive killing of the suspected perpetrator, Giuliano, and the trial against Giuliano's lieutenant, Gaspare Pisciotta, and other remaining members of Giuliano's gang. While Scelba dismissed any political motive, Li Causi stressed the political nature of the massacre – and tried to uncover the truth. Li Causi claimed that the police inspector Ettore Messana – supposed to coordinate the persecution of the bandits – had been in league with Giuliano and denounced Scelba for allowing Messana to remain in office. Later documents would prove the accusation.

Li Causi suspected a campaign against the left and linked it with the crisis in the national government (under Prime Minister Alcide De Gasperi), which would lead to the expulsion of the communists and socialist from government, as well as to prevent the left from entering the regional government. On 30 May 1947, Giuseppe Alessi, became the first president of the Sicilian region with the support of the centre-right and on the same day, De Gasperi announced his new centrist government, which had been in the national union governments since 1945.

== Challenging Giuliano ==
Girolamo Li Causi addressing a commemorative meeting in Portella della Ginestra

Speaking at Portella della Ginestra on the second anniversary of the massacre, Li Causi publicly called on Giuliano to name names. He received a written reply from the bandit leader:

It is only men with no shame who gives out names. Not a man who tends to take justice into his own hands; who aims to keep his reputation in society high, and who values this aim more than his own life.

Li Causi responded by reminding Giuliano that he would almost certainly be betrayed: "Don't you understand that Scelba will have you killed?" Giuliano again replied, hinting at the powerful secrets that he possessed:

I know that Scelba wants to have me killed; he wants to have me killed because I keep a nightmare hanging over him. I can make sure he is brought to account for actions that, if revealed, would destroy his political career and end his life.

Salvatore Giuliano was killed on 5 July 1950, when the hearings for the trial against Giuliano's captured associates started in Viterbo, near Rome. He always denied that there had been anyone behind him who had ordered the killing. However, his lieutenant, Pisciotta and other witnesses claimed that a few days before the massacre, on 27 April 1947, Giuliano had received a letter, which he destroyed immediately after reading it. He told his gang: "Boys, the hour of our liberation is at hand." According to the witnesses, the letter demanded the massacre at Portella della Ginestra in exchange for liberty for all of the gang.

== Viterbo trial ==
The trial against the perpetrators for the massacre started in the summer of 1950 in Viterbo. Scelba was again said to have been involved in the plot to carry out the massacre, but the accusations were often contradictory or vague. In the end, the judge concluded that no higher authority had ordered the massacre, and that the Giuliano band had acted autonomously. At the Viterbo trial, Pisciotta said:

Again and again Scelba has gone back on his word: Mattarella and Cusumano returned to Rome to plead for total amnesty for us, but Scelba denied all his promises.

Pisciotta also claimed that he had killed the bandit Salvatore Giuliano in his sleep by arrangement with Scelba. However, there was no evidence that Scelba had had any relationship with Pisciotta.

At the trial for the Portella della Ginestra massacre, Gaspare Pisciotta said:

Those who have made promises to us are called Bernardo Mattarella, Prince Alliata, the monarchist MP Marchesano and also Signor Scelba, Minister for Home Affairs ... it was Marchesano, Prince Alliata and Bernardo Mattarella who ordered the massacre of Portella di Ginestra. Before the massacre they met Giuliano..." However the MPs Mattarella, Alliata and Marchesano were declared innocent by the Court of Appeal of Palermo, at a trial which dealt with their alleged role in the event.

== Witnesses disappear ==
Gaspare Pisciotta (left) at the trial in Viterbo in 1951

Pisciotta was sentenced to life imprisonment and forced labour; most of the other 70 bandits met the same fate. Others were at large, but one by one they all disappeared. Pisciotta probably was the only one who could reveal the truth behind the massacre. While he was in Giuliano's band, he carried a pass signed by a colonel of the Carabinieri that allowed him to move freely about the island. At the trial, he declared, "We are one body: bandits, police and Mafia – like the Father, the Son and the Holy Spirit."

While serving his sentence, he wrote his autobiography, awaiting a new trial at which he would be charged with killing Giuliano. Some authorities were beginning to take his evidence more seriously, and perjury and other charges were made against police and Carabinieri. Pisciotta realised that he had been abandoned and was threatening to reveal much more than at the first trial, in particular, who signed the letter which had been brought to Giuliano just before the attack. On 9 February 1954, he took a cup of coffee with what he thought was a tuberculosis medicine. Instead, someone had replaced it with strychnine. Within an hour, he was dead, and his autobiography disappeared.

The massacre created a national scandal, which ended in 1956 with the conviction of the remaining members of Giuliano's gang. It still remains a highly controversial topic. The finger of blame has been pointed at numerous sources, including the Italian government. Leftists who were the victims of the attack have blamed the landed barons and the Mafia; significantly, the memorial plaque erected by them makes no mention of Giuliano or his band:

On May 1, 1947, while celebrating the working class festival and the victory of April 20, men, women and children of Piana, S. Cipirello and S. Giuseppe fell under the bullets of the Mafia and the landed barons to crush the struggle of the peasants against feudalism.

— Portella della Ginestra massacre memorial plaque

== Theories ==
While some historians see the massacre as a conspiracy of the Mafia, anti-communist political forces – the Christian-Democratic party in particular – and American intelligence services in the wake of the Cold War, others consider the bloodbath as the culmination of local struggles for land rights and land reform in the area of Piana degli Albanesi and San Giuseppe Jato. Just as at the end of World War I, the post-war period saw an increase of violence between landowners backed by the Mafia and left-wing peasant movements. A few weeks before the massacre, the local Mafia boss of Piana, Francesco Cuccia, and others had asked landowners for money to "put an end to the communists once and for all." They made clear that they were ready to go beyond the traditional acts of Mafia violence that had been used against the socialist peasant movement before the rise of fascism in the early 1920s, when six socialist militants had been killed in Piana.

"Without the consent of the Mafia in Piana degli Albanesi, San Giuseppe Jato and San Cipirello, Giuliano could not have shot at Portella della Ginestra," according to the historian Francesco Renda. Renda, among others, was an eyewitness of the massacre. That May morning, he was supposed to speak at Portella. "But I got a bit late and before my eyes this horrific tragedy happened." Renda recalls that immediately after the massacre, the peasants of Piana wanted their own justice, threatening to kill the mafiosi of their county. "I convinced them," Renda remembered, "that that would have been the provocation needed to outlaw the Communists."

== In the arts ==
=== Film depictions ===
Salvatore Giuliano is a 1962 Italian film directed by Francesco Rosi. Shot in a neo-realist documentary, non-linear style, it follows the lives of those involved with Giuliano. When Rosi came to Sicily in 1961 to re-enact the Portella Della Ginestra massacre sequence for the film, the trauma from 14 years earlier was still fresh. He asked 1,000 peasants to go back and enact exactly what they, their friends and relatives had been through. Events nearly slipped out of control. When the gunfire sound effects started, the crowd panicked and knocked over one of the cameras in rush to escape; women wept and knelt in prayer; men threw themselves to the ground in agony. One old woman, dressed entirely in black, planted herself before the camera and repeated in an anguished wail, "Where are my children?" Two of her sons had died at the hands of Giuliano and his gang.

A deleted scene from The Godfather is an allusion to the events and to Mario Puzo's novel The Sicilian. The scene takes place during Michael Corleone's exile in Sicily. He and his companions witness a parade of communist marchers headed to Portella delle Ginestre and singing Bandiera Rossa.

Michael Cimino's 1987 version, a film adaptation of Mario Puzo's The Sicilian, was filmed instead at Sutera and Caltanissetta.

The massacre was also depicted in 2009 in Giuseppe Tornatore's film Baarìa – La porta del vento.

=== Literature ===
The novel The Sicilian, a fictionalized take on the life of Giuliano by Mario Puzo, depicts the massacre.

Sicilian author and playwright Beatrice Monroy wrote a poem to commemorate the tragedy, "Portella della Ginestra: Indice dei nomi proibiti" (2005). She retells the massacre from the point of view of the victims and their feelings of despair and thirst for justice, as a song of sorrow for the downtrodden of the earth, and as a crime whose instigators are still officially unknown.

== See also ==
- List of massacres in Italy
- List of victims of the Sicilian Mafia
