= Massimo Mollica =

Italian actor and stage director

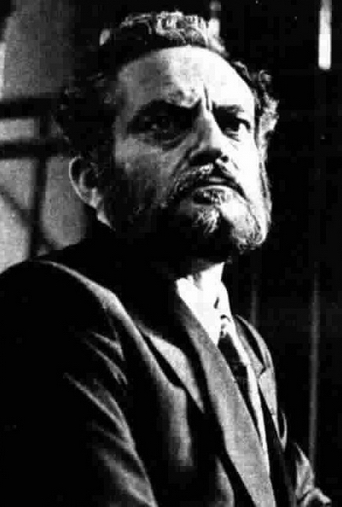
- Born: 19 March 1929; Pace del Mela, Messina
- Died: 1 May 2013 (aged 84); Messina
- Occupations: Actor and stage director

Massimo Mollica (19 March 1929 – 1 May 2013) was an Italian actor and stage director.

Born in Pace del Mela, Messina, the son of an elementary school teacher, Mollica started acting at the university. His breakout role was Don Vito Cascio Ferro in the 1972 RAI television series Joe Petrosino. Mollica was mainly active as a stage actor and director, and he founded several theatres in Messina, including the San Carlino Theatre and the Teatro Pirandello. His film roles include Pasquale Squitieri's I Am the Law and Francesco Rosi's Salvatore Giuliano.

== Filmography ==
Year	Title	Role	Notes
1973	Metti... che ti rompo il muso	Don Calogero Nicosia	
1974	L'arbitro	La Forgia	
1977	Mala, amore e morte	Barone Francesco De Carolis	
1977	I Am the Law	Procuratore Paternò	
1977	Death Hunt	Corsi	
1981	The Mafia Triangle	Don Raffaele	
1982	My Darling, My Dearest	Pappalucerna	
