= My Darling, My Dearest =

- Directed by: Sergio Corbucci
- Written by: Sergio Corbucci; Gianni Romoli; Giancarlo Giannini
- Produced by: Piero La Mantia
- Starring: Giancarlo Giannini; Mariangela Melato; Massimo Mollica; Stefania Sandrelli
- Cinematography: Giuseppe Rotunno
- Edited by: Ruggero Mastroianni
- Music by: La Bionda
- Distributed by: Cinema International Corporation
- Release date: 1981
- Country: Italy
- Language: Italian

My Darling, My Dearest (Italian: Bello mio, bellezza mia) is a 1981 Italian comedy film directed by Sergio Corbucci.

== Cast ==
- Giancarlo Giannini: Gennarino Laganà
- Mariangela Melato: Armida
- Stefania Sandrelli: Clarabella
- Massimo Mollica: Pappalucerna
- Sal Borgese: Cicciuzzo
- Giuliana Calandra: Zuava
- Enzo Liberti: Commendatore

== See also ==
- List of Italian films of 1981
