= Francesco Renda =

- Born: 18 February 1922; Cattolica Eraclea, Sicily
- Died: 12 May 2013 (aged 91); Palermo
- Occupations: historian, Communist politician and a university professor

Francesco Renda (18 February 1922 – 12 May 2013) was an Italian Marxist historian, Communist politician and a university professor.

Renda was born in Cattolica Eraclea in Sicily. He graduated in philosophy. At a young age he enrolled in the Italian Communist Party (Partito Comunista Italiano – PCI). He became Secretary in charge of Camera Confederale del Lavoro in Agrigento.

== Portella della Ginestra Massacre ==
He was an eye-witness of the Portella della Ginestra massacre, when 11 people were killed and 27 wounded during May Day celebrations in Sicily on May 1, 1947, by the bandit and separatist leader Salvatore Giuliano and his band. That May morning he was supposed to speak at Portella, but due to a defect of his motorcycle he arrived late. "Before my eyes this horrific tragedy happened," Renda recalls. Immediately after the massacre, the peasants of Piana wanted their own justice, threatening to kill the mafiosi of their county. "I convinced them,” Renda remembered, "that that would have been the provocation needed to outlaw the Communists."

== Political career ==
In 1951 he was elected member of the Sicilian Regional Assembly for the People’s Block (Blocco del popolo) – a coalition of the PCI and the Italian Socialist Party (Partito Socialista Italiano, PSI) for the district of Agrigento, and was reelected in PCI for five consecutive legislatures. He resigned in November 1967 to run for the Italian Senate. Elected senator in the 5th legislature (1968–1972), he was a member of the Committee on regional issues.

== Academic career ==
He did not run again in 1972 and returned to the University. He became Professor of Modern History at the Faculty of Political Science of University of Palermo and subsequently president of the Gramsci Institute in Sicily. As a Marxist historian, he is one of the most important scholars of the peasant movement in Sicily. Renda described himself in his autobiography (2007) as a historian of the peasant movement who was born and raised in that world, and then become a witness and leader of its revival.

His most important works are a history of the Fasci Siciliani, the Sicilian Mafia, and a 1493-page history of Sicily in three volumes (Storia della Sicilia dal 1860 al 1970) published in 2003.

Since 1997, he was a professor emeritus at the University of Palermo. He died on 12 May 2013 in Palermo.
