= Michele Pantaleone =

Italian politician

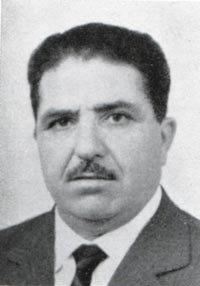
- Born: 30 November 1911; Villalba, Italy
- Died: 12 February 2002 (aged 90); Palermo, Italy
- Occupation: Journalist
- Known for: Investigative journalism

Michele Pantaleone (30 November 1911 – 12 February 2002) was a respected journalist and expert on the Sicilian Mafia and one of the first to shed light on the links between organized crime and political power.

Pantaleone was born in Villalba, a village in a poor region of Sicily, where most people lived of subsistence agriculture, which was also the home town of the prominent Mafia boss Calogero Vizzini. Pantaleone came from a relatively well off family and was trained as a land surveyor. Initially a leading member of the Italian Socialist Party (Partito Socialista Italiano, PSI) in Villalba he later switched to the Italian Communist Party (Partito Comunista Italiano, PCI).

== Opposing Don Calò ==
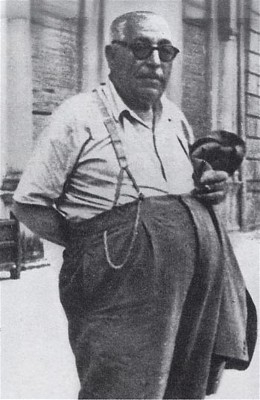
Calogero Vizzini, Mafia boss of Villalba

Pantaleone was born in Villalba, into a local family of professionals whose republican traditions opposed the power of Mafia boss Calogero Vizzini, who was a staunch catholic as well. (Vizzini’s brothers, Giovanni and Giuseppe, both became priests). His house was opposite of that of Vizzini on the other side of the main square of Villalba. Vizzini once in vain proposed Pantaleone to marry his niece Raimunda. Pantaleone declined. He knew all too well what dangerous obligations that would involve.

In 1944, after the Allied occupation of Sicily, Pantaleone, heading a peasant cooperative, and Vizzini disputed the lease of the large estate Miccichè. Pantaleone used his leverage in the left wing press and his contacts with left wing political parties. In return Vizzini arranged for vandalizing the crops on Pantaleone family’s land. There was even a failed attempt on Pantaleone’s life. He was the vice-mayor of Villalba, while Vizzini was mayor. Both were appointed by the Allied Military Government of Occupied Territories.

== The Villalba attack ==
The socialist Pantaleone organised an election rally of the Blocco del popolo (The Popular Front) in Sicily in Villalba on 16 September 1944, inviting the Palermo-based communist leader Girolamo Li Causi. The communists, worried that Pantaleone would lead them in trouble, contacted Vizzini who assured them there would be no trouble as long as they did not touch on local issues. Li Causi spoke to the landless labourers and denounced the unjust exploitation by the Mafia.

But when Li Causi started to talk about how the peasants were being deceived by ‘a powerful leaseholder’ – a thinly disguised reference to Vizzini – the Mafia boss hurled: It’s a lie. Pandemonium broke out and the rally ended in a shoot out which left 18 people wounded including Li Causi and Pantaleone. Six months later Vizzini acquired the lease for the Miccichè estate.

== Antimafia journalist ==
Pantaleone would move on to become a prominent Antimafia politician and journalist. He was elected as regional deputy in the Sicilian parliament in 1947-1951 and again in 1967-1971 as an independent candidate on the list of the Italian Communist Party (Partito Comunista Italiano, PCI). He worked for L'Ora an independent left wing newspaper in Palermo close to the PCI. Other contributors were the writer Leonardo Sciascia and Mauro De Mauro, who mysteriously disappeared in 1970.

He published several books about the Mafia in the 1960s and acquired a small but dedicated audience. Pantaleone was one of the first to shed light on the links between Cosa Nostra and the Christian Democrat party (DC – Democrazia Cristiana). His articles and books caused several libel court cases by DC-politicians such as Bernardo Mattarella and Giovanni Gioia. Pantaleone was sentenced to eight months and ten days in prison and to pay court costs' for aggravated defamation in the press of Mattarella. His strong views made him a controversial person also among his supporters, such as the communist mayor of Villalba, Luigi Lumia. Pantaleone died in Palermo, in his nineties.

"He was the first one to provide the Italian public opinion with a lot of material on organized crime," said Italian journalist, Saverio Lodato, who covers the Mafia. "Thanks to his work, the Mafia became a national issue." Pantaleone appeared in films about the Mafia, such as Il sasso in bocca (1969), directed by Giuseppe Ferrara and Il caso Mattei (The Mattei Affair) (1972), directed by Francesco Rosi.

== Luciano legend ==
Pantaleone is seen as the source of the legend about the role of Lucky Luciano in the Allied invasion of Sicily in 1943. According to his version published in "Mafia e politica 1943-1962" a US Army airplane had flown over Villalba on the day of the invasion and dropped a yellow silk foulard (scarf) marked with a black L (indicating Luciano). Two days later, three American tanks rolled into Villalba after driving thirty miles through enemy territory. Mafia boss Calogero Vizzini climbed aboard and spent the next six days travelling through western Sicily organizing support for the advancing American troops. The Mafia protected the roads from snipers, arranged enthusiastic welcomes for the advancing troops, and provided guides through the confusing mountain terrain.

Most serious historians are inclined to dismiss the legend of Luciano's foulard nowadays. When confronted with scepticism about his account by a journalist of La Repubblica in 2000, Pantaleone maintained his version as an eyewitness to the events.

== Publications ==
- "Mafia e politica 1943-1962", Turin: Giulio Einaudi editore, 1962 (English version: "The Mafia and Politics", London: Chatto & Windus, 1966)
- "Mafia e droga", Turin: Giulio Einaudi Editore, 1966
- "Antimafia: occasione mancata", Turin: Giulio Einaudi Editore, 1969
- "L'industria del potere", Bologna: Cappelli, 1972
- "L’antimafia in tribunale", Centro editoriale del mezzogiorno, 1976
- "A cavallo della tigre", Flaccovio, 1984
- "Mafia e antimafia", Naples: Tullio Pironti Editore, 1992
- "Omertà di stato", Naples: Tullio Pironti Editore, 1993

=== Articles ===
- (in Italian) Poi arrivò Lucky Luciano e anche Napoli fu Cosa Nostra, article by Michele Pantaleone in I Siciliani, March 1983

== Biography ==
- Grasso, Mario 1994. "Michele Pantaleone personaggio scomodo. Una vita contro la mafia e la malagiustizia", Prova d'Autore: ISBN 88-86140-06-1
