= Cammarata =

- Comune
- Comune di Cammarata
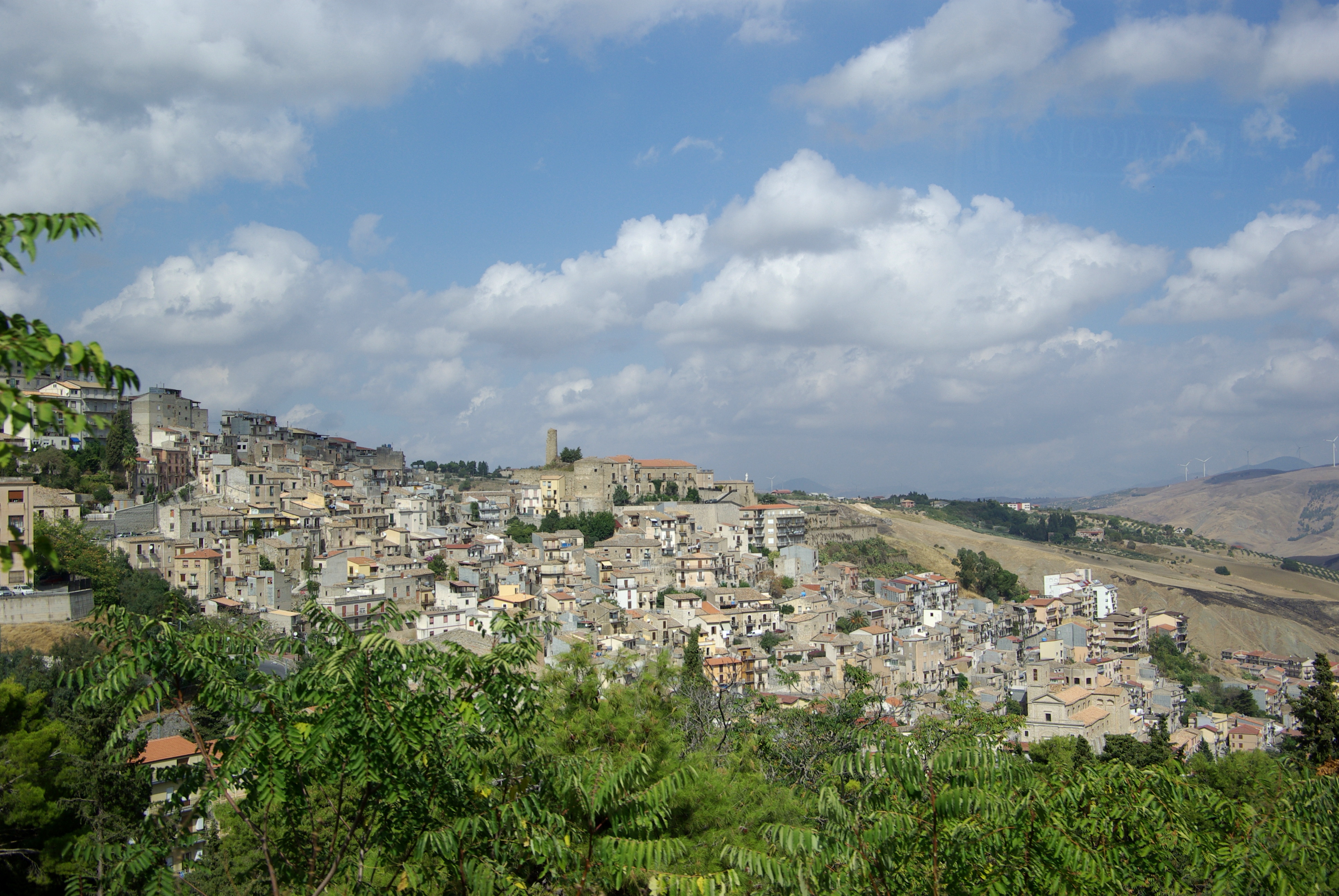
- View of Cammarata

- Location within Italy Location within Sicily
- Coordinates: 37°38′N 13°38′E
- Country: Italy
- Region: Sicily
- Province: Agrigento (AG)
- Frazioni: Borgo Callea

Government
  - Mayor: Giuseppe Mangiapane

Area
  - Total: 192.46 km^{2} (74.31 sq mi)
- Elevation: 682 m (2,238 ft)

Population (30 April 2017)
  - Total: 6,269
  - Density: 32.57/km^{2} (84.36/sq mi)
- Demonym: Cammaratesi
- Time zone: UTC+1 (CET)
  - Summer (DST): UTC+2 (CEST)
- Postal code: 92022
- Dialing code: 0922
- Patron saint: St. Nicholas of Bari
- Saint day: December 6
- Website: Official website

Cammarata is a comune (municipality) in the Province of Agrigento in the Italian region Sicily, located about 60 kilometres (37 mi) southeast of Palermo and about 35 kilometres (22 mi) north of Agrigento on the eponymous mountain Mount Cammarata, which has an elevation 1,578 metres (5,177 ft) above sea level in a territory rich in forests.

Cammarata borders the following municipalities: Acquaviva Platani, Casteltermini, Castronovo di Sicilia, Mussomeli, San Giovanni Gemini, Santo Stefano Quisquina, Vallelunga Pratameno, Villalba.

== History ==
The name derives from the Greek Kàmara, meaning "vaulted room".

King Roger I laid siege to Cammarata in 1087 and sold it to a relative Lucia d'Altavilla (or in English Lucy of Hauteville). She then assumed the title Dominae Camaratae or Lucy of Cammarata for the town she was given.

The town is mentioned in 1141 in a document mentioning several Arabic localities, a sign that it was settled at least from the Islamic domination of the island.

The county of Cammarata followed the history of Sicily under the Normans, the Hohenstaufen and the War of the Vespers. During the 14th and 15th centuries, the town supplied rock salt to nearby Palermo.

In 1397 the count rebelled and the town was besieged by Bernardo Cabrera, general of king Martin II of Sicily. Later it was a fief of the Abatellis.

== Main sights ==
- The castle, an example of Aragonese architecture
