= Villalba, Sicily =

Villalba
- Comune
- Comune di Villalba
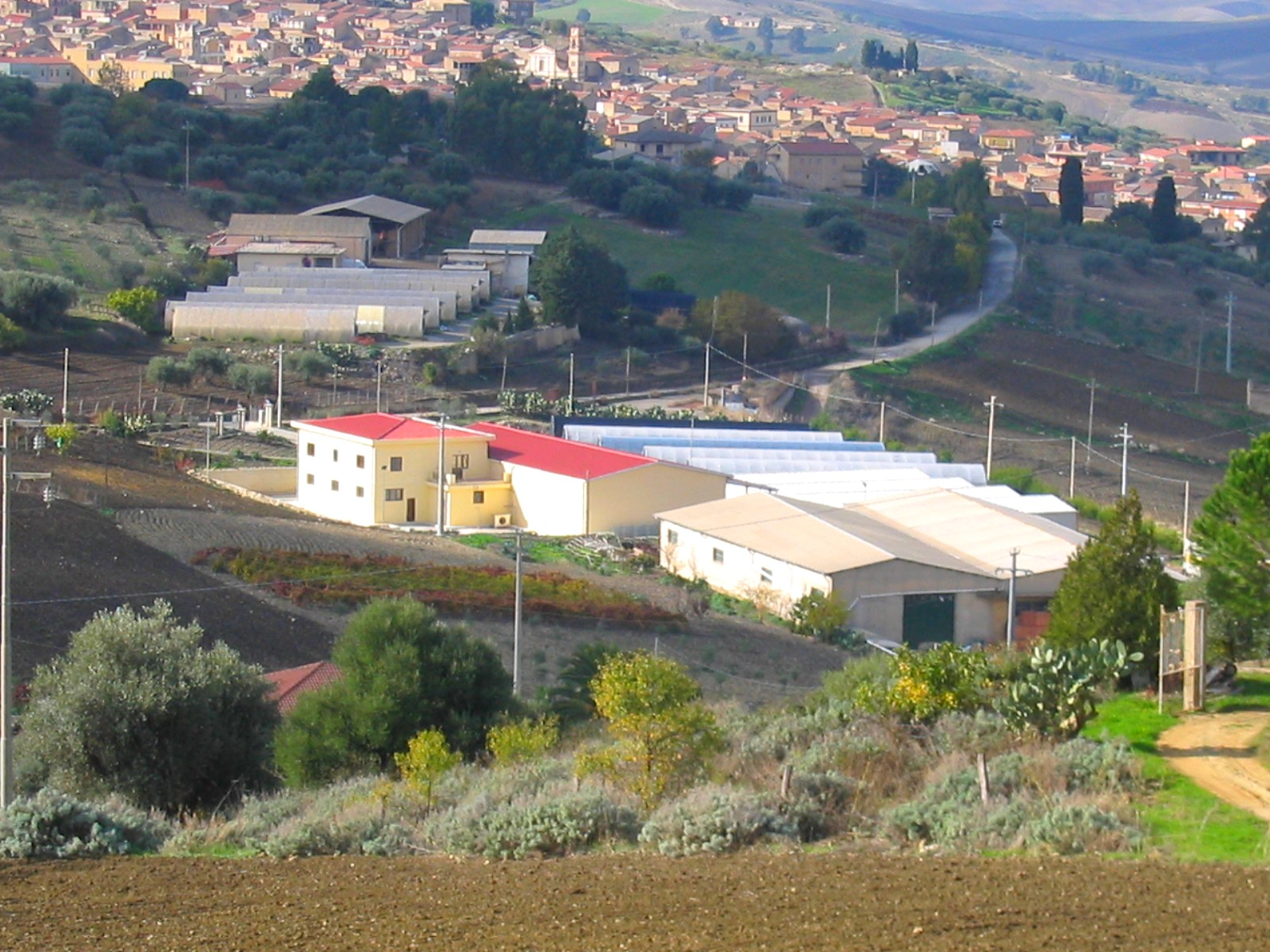

- Location within Italy Location within Sicily
- Coordinates: 37°39′N 13°50′E
- Country: Italy
- Region: Sicily
- Province: Province of Caltanissetta (CL)

Area
  - Total: 41.5 km^{2} (16.0 sq mi)
- Elevation: 620 m (2,030 ft)

Population (Dec. 2004)
  - Total: 1,852
  - Density: 44.6/km^{2} (116/sq mi)
- Demonym: Villalbesi
- Time zone: UTC+1 (CET)
  - Summer (DST): UTC+2 (CEST)
- Postal code: 93010
- Dialing code: 0934
- Website: Official website

Villalba (Sicilian: Villarba) is a comune (municipality) in the Province of Caltanissetta in the Italian region Sicily, located about 51 kilometres (32 mi) northwest of Caltanissetta, about 98 kilometres (61 mi) southeast of Palermo and 68 km from Agrigento. As of 31 December 2004, it had a population of 1,852 and an area of 41.5 square kilometres (16.0 mi^{2}). It rises over an internal hilly area, 620 metres above sea-level.

The name Villalba has Spanish origins, and it means "the white city" because of the town's white houses. Villalba is known for the cultivation of cereals, grapes, vegetables, tomatoes, and lentils. The Sagra del Pomodoro (tomato festival) is held every year in the month of August.

Villalba borders the following municipalities: Cammarata, Castellana Sicula, Marianopoli, Mussomeli, Petralia Sottana, Polizzi Generosa, Vallelunga Pratameno.

== History ==
Since the 17th century, the fief was owned by the Miccichè family. In 1751, it was acquired by Nicolò Palmieri Calafato, who also obtained the approval to populate the area. The first houses were constructed in 1763.

During the 18th century the town experienced a remarkable urban and architectural growth. There are various important monuments, such as the Chiesa Madre built in 1700, and the Chiesa della Concezione erected in 1795, preserving a statue by artist Filippo Quattrocchi (first half of the 18th century). Noteworthy is the Palace of baron Nicolò Palmieri Morillo, built during the 18th century.

== Demographic evolution ==
Historical population

Year	Pop.	±%
1861	3,353	—
1871	3,580	+6.8%
1881	4,181	+16.8%
1901	3,426	−18.1%
1911	4,113	+20.1%

Year	Pop.	±%
1921	3,505	−14.8%
1931	3,924	+12.0%
1936	4,392	+11.9%
1951	4,932	+12.3%
1961	3,737	−24.2%

Year	Pop.	±%
1971	2,408	−35.6%
1981	2,307	−4.2%
1991	2,152	−6.7%
2001	1,916	−11.0%

Source: Data from ISTAT

== Notable people ==
- Dennis Farina American film actor and former police detective whose father was from Villalba.
- Angelo Bruno (1910–80), Sicilian-American mobster born in Villalba who ran the Philadelphia crime family for two decades.
- Michele Pantaleone (1911–2002), journalist and expert on the Sicilian Mafia and one of the first to shed light on the links between organized crime and political power.
- Joe Plumeri (born 1944), the Chairman & CEO of Willis Group Holdings and the owner of the Trenton Thunder, is the descendant of grandparents who emigrated to the U.S. from Villalba
- Patricia F. Russo Pat Russo (born 1952 in Trenton, New Jersey) is an American businessperson most widely known for having been chief executive officer of Lucent Technologies and its successor, Alcatel-Lucent, a large communications equipment manufacturer. She is on the board of directors of HP, General Motors, Merck & Co. and ALCOA, Inc. She is chairman of the nonprofit organization Partnership at Drugfree.org Forbes magazine rated Russo as the tenth on its list of the most powerful women in 2006. Pat's great-grandparents and grandparents emigrated from Villalba to the United States.
- Calogero Vizzini (1877–1954), Mafia boss considered to be one of the most influential bosses after World War II until his death. In the media he was often depicted as the "boss of bosses"–though such a position does not officially exist in the structure of Cosa Nostra.
