= Gaspare Pisciotta =

Sicilian criminal

Gaspare Pisciotta (left) and Salvatore Giuliano

Gaspare Pisciotta (Montelepre, 5 March 1924 – Palermo, 9 February 1954) was a companion of the Sicilian bandit Salvatore Giuliano, and considered to be the co-leader of his outlaw band. He is also the Judas in Giuliano's legend as he betrayed Giuliano and killed him.

== Origins ==
Gaspare Pisciotta, nicknamed Aspanu by friends, was born in Montelepre in Western Sicily in 1924. While Giuliano remained in Montelepre during the war, Pisciotta joined the army and was captured fighting against the Germans. He was released in 1945 and returned to Sicily, joining Giuliano's separatist campaign and thus being one of the founding members of his band.

== Trial ==
Shortly after Giuliano's death on 5 July 1950, Pisciotta was captured and brought to trial for his crimes as a bandit. During the trial for the Portella della Ginestra massacre he made the startling revelation that it had been he who assassinated Giuliano in his sleep, a statement which contradicted the police account that Giuliano had been shot by Carabinieri captain Antonio Perenze in a gunfight in Castelvetrano. He claimed to have killed Giuliano on the instruction of Mario Scelba, then Minister of the Interior, and to have had an arrangement with Colonel Ugo Luca, the head of the anti-bandit force in Sicily, to collaborate on the condition that he should not be charged and that Luca would intervene in his favour if he were caught.

At the trial, Pisciotta said: "Those who have made promises to us are called Bernardo Mattarella, Prince Alliata, the monarchist MP Marchesano and also Signor Scelba, Minister for Home Affairs ... it was Marchesano, Prince Alliata and Bernardo Mattarella who ordered the massacre of Portella di Ginestra. Before the massacre, they met Giuliano". However, the MPs Mattarella, Alliata and Marchesano were declared innocent by the Court of Appeal of Palermo, at a trial which dealt with their alleged role in the event. During his trial Pisciotta could not account for Giuliano's documents in which he named the high-ranking government officials and mafiosi involved with Giuliano's band.

Pisciotta was sentenced to life in imprisonment and forced labour; most of the other 70 bandits met the same fate. Others were at large, but one by one they all disappeared. When Pisciotta realized that he had been abandoned by all and was condemned, he declared that he was going to tell the whole truth, in particular, who signed the letter which had been brought to Giuliano on 27 April 1947, which demanded the massacre at Portella delle Ginistra in exchange for liberty for us all and which Giuliano had destroyed immediately.

Giuliano's mother reportedly had suspected Pisciotta as a potential traitor before her son's death, although Giuliano had tried to convince her of his trust in his lieutenant in a letter: "we respect each other as brothers' what he is I am, and what I am he is." If Gaspare Pisciotta's testimony was true, Giuliano suspected nothing until the time of his death.

== Imprisonment and death ==
In prison, Pisciotta made it clear that he believed his life was in danger. He was reported to have said "One of these days, they will kill me", and he refused to share a cell with anyone but his father, also serving a life sentence for involvement in Giuliano's band. Gaspare even reportedly kept a tame sparrow to test his food for poison, and ate nothing but what his mother brought for him from home. However, on the morning of 9 February 1954, Gaspare took a vitamin preparation which he stirred into his coffee and drank. He almost immediately became violently ill, and despite being rushed to the prison infirmary, he was dead within forty minutes. The cause of death, as revealed by the autopsy, was the ingestion of 20 mg of strychnine.

Both the government and the Mafia were suggested as being behind the murder of Pisciotta, but no one was ever brought to trial. Gaspare's mother Rosalia wrote a letter to the press on 18 March 1954 denouncing the governmental corruption and possible Mafia involvement in her son's death, stating: "Yes, it is true that my son Gaspare will never open his mouth again, and already many people think they are safe; but who knows – perhaps other things may speak." Gaspare Pisciotta had supposedly written an autobiography in prison, to which his mother may have been referring, and which his brother Pietro tried to sell. However, this document went missing and its contents remain unknown.

== Dramatisations ==
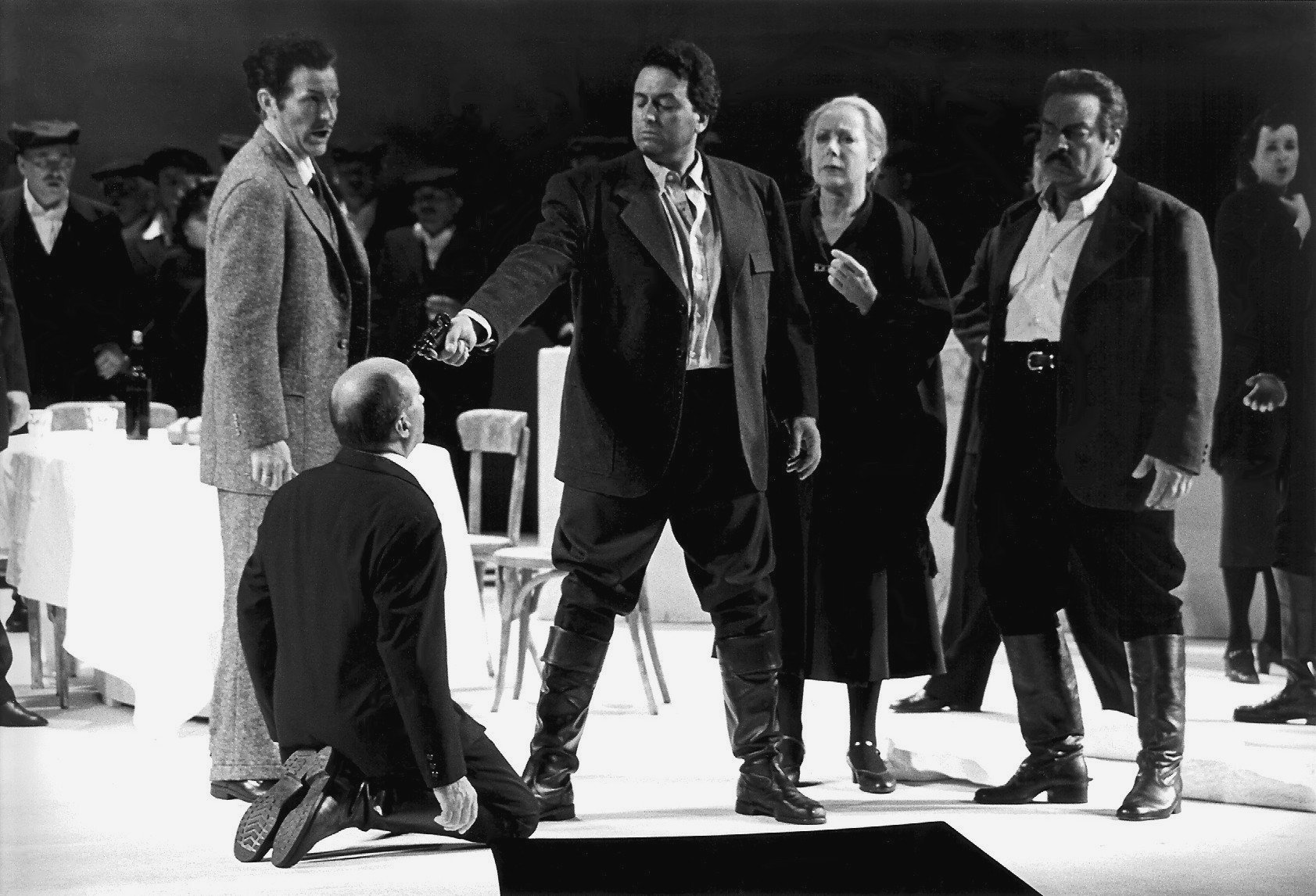
Pisciotta (left) in a scene from the opera Salvatore Giuliano, Staatstheater Kassel, 1996.

In Francesco Rosi's 1961 film, Salvatore Giuliano, Pisciotta was played by Frank Wolff. Mario Puzo's 1984 novel The Sicilian is a dramatized version of Giuliano and Pisciotta's story, set in the universe of The Godfather. The book was made into a film in 1987, directed by Michael Cimino, starring Christopher Lambert as Giuliano, and John Turturro as Pisciotta.

Gaspare Pisciotta is also a character in the opera Salvatore Giuliano, written by the Italian composer Lorenzo Ferrero in 1985.

In Paolo Sorrentino's 2008 film "Il divo", it is suggested that former Prime Minister Giulio Andreotti was partly responsible for Pisciotta's murder when Interior Minister, as Pisciotta could have revealed who instigated Giuliano's death.
