= Arrigo Petacco =

Italian writer, historian and journalist

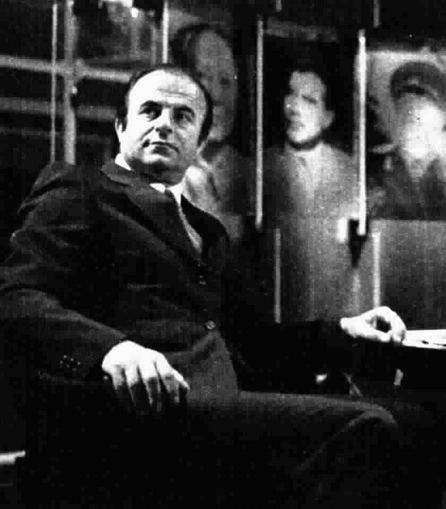
- Born: Arrigo Petacco; August 7, 1929; Castelnuovo Magra, Kingdom of Italy
- Died: April 3, 2018 (aged 88); Porto Venere, Italy
- Occupations: Writer, journalist, historian
- Writing career
- Language: Italian
- Period: 20th–21st century

Arrigo Petacco (7 August 1929 – 3 April 2018) was an Italian writer, historian and journalist.

== Life and activities ==
Petacco was special envoy, editor-in-chief and executive director of La Nazione and La Storia Illustrata, and author of the homonymous monthly television program on the RAI.

He began his journalistic career at Il Lavoro, a newspaper published in Genoa, directed by Sandro Pertini. Prolific historical writer, experienced journalist, he wrote several film plots and made numerous television programs, especially for RAI, the Italian main public service broadcaster. In his career as a journalist has interviewed some of the protagonists of the Second World War.

In 1957, Petacco married Lucetta De Martino with whom he had two daughters: Monica, who lives in Rome, and Carlotta, living in Milan. He is widowed since 1989. Since then he lives alone in Portovenere, near La Spezia.

In 1983, he won the Saint Vincent award for journalism and in 2006 received the Capo d'Orlando prize for journalism. Petacco died on 3 April 2018 of liver cancer at the age of 88.

== Selected works ==
- L'esodo: la tragedia negata degli italiani d'Istria, Dalmazia e Venezia Giulia. Milano, Mondadori, 1999.
- A tragedy revealed: the story of the Italian population of Istria, Dalmatia, and Venezia Giulia, 1942–1956 Toronto, University of Toronto Press, 2005.

== See also ==
- Istrian-Dalmatian exodus
- Sandro Pertini
- Premio Saint-Vincent per il giornalismo
