= Francesco Cuccia =

Mafia member

Francesco Cuccia (1876 – 1957), also known as Don Ciccio, was a member of the Sicilian Mafia and one-time mayor of Piana dei Greci (now Piana degli Albanesi). He is best known as the Mafia boss who triggered Benito Mussolini’s war on the Mafia, after humiliating him while visiting Piana dei Greci in 1924. He was described by the writer Norman Lewis as a Mafia potentate with an inflamed sense of his own importance. The Sicilian writer Giuseppe Passarello called him "Cuccia il sanguinario" (Cuccia the bloodthirsty).

== Mafia boss in Piana dei Greci ==
Born in Rome to wealthy parents of Arbëreshë descent, Ciccio was a distant cousin to prominent financier Enrico Cuccia. Cuccia was one of the Mafia bosses of Piana dei Greci, a town known for its strong peasant movement demanding land reform. He sided with the landowners against the socialist-inspired movement headed by Nicola Barbato, one of the leaders of the Fasci Siciliani in 1892–1893. Since those days, the town was known as Piana la rossa (Red Piana). In the late nineteenth, early twentieth century, the struggle for the rights and freedoms of peasants in Sicily was also a struggle against the Mafia.

In June 1914, the socialists won the municipal elections with a landslide. During the election campaign, the socialist militants Mariano Barbato (a cousin of Nicola Barbato) and Giorgio Pecoraro had been killed. Cuccia was suspected to be behind the slayings, but was not charged until ten years later.

== Fighting the socialists ==
After World War I, the struggle of the landless peasants intensified. Sicilian peasants returning from the front found a disastrous economic situation. During their military service, their fields had been abandoned and overgrown, and inflation reduced them to starvation. The only people, who had become rich by taking advantage of this situation, were the landowners and their leaseholders such as Cuccia. Social tension began to rise across the country, known as the Biennio Rosso (Red Biennium – 1919–1920).

In Piana dei Greci the socialists won the elections of October 1920, gaining all seats in the municipal council and electing the mayor. During the parliamentary elections of May 1921 socialist candidates could not campaign or go to the polls due to serious intimidation by the Mafia. Under pressure from the Mafia and the prefect and the police, the Socialist Party left the municipal council and even had to close the local section. The town was then placed under a commissioner until the new elections on April 9, 1922, when the Liberal Democrats list led by Francesco Cuccia won by a landslide. The list was "composed of three-fifths of people belonging to the mafia."

Cuccia, known for his boast 'Qui non si muove foglia, che io non voglia' (Here not even a leaf moves if I do not want it to'), ruled Piana from 1922 to 1926. The Arbëreshë poet Giuseppe Schirò publicly defended the Mafia administration of Cuccia several times, considering it "the most suitable for the peaceful development of the best qualities of its people," able to open "a new period in our history." In a speech from the balcony of City Hall, he praised Cuccia to have had the merit and the courage "to have done away with that red flag of socialism from our community."

In June that year, Cuccia received King Vittorio Emanuele III in full regalia in the local town hall, and, in return, was awarded the prestigious Knights Cross of the Crown of Italy (Croce di Cavalieri della Corona d’Italia). According to legend, Cuccia was able to manoeuvre the king into baptizing his child.

== Triggering Mussolini's war on the Mafia ==
Two years later, in May 1924, the Fascist leader Benito Mussolini, then prime minister, visited Sicily and also passed through Piana dei Greci where he was received by the mayor Don Ciccio. At some point Cuccia expressed surprise at Mussolini's police escort and whispered in his ear: "You are with me, you are under my protection. What do you need all these cops for?" To Cuccia the large police escort indicated a lack of respect. When Mussolini declined to release the substantial police force, Cuccia had the central town square emptied when Il Duce made his speech. Mussolini found himself addressing a group of some 20 village idiots, beggars, bootblacks and lottery ticket sellers picked out as an audience by Don Ciccio. He felt humiliated and outraged.

Cuccia's careless remark and subsequent insult has passed into history as the catalyst for Mussolini's war on the Mafia. When Mussolini firmly established his power in January 1925, he appointed Cesare Mori as the Prefect of Palermo, with the order to eradicate the Mafia at any price. In 1927, when reporting on the progress of the drive against the Mafia in Sicily to the Chamber of Deputies, Mussolini referred specifically to Cuccia as "that unspeakable mayor who found ways of getting himself portrayed at every solemn occasion" and who was now safely behind bars.

Cuccia and his brother had been arrested on July 2, 1924, on charges of murdering the socialist militants Mariano Barbato and Giorgio Pecoraro in May 1914. However, on May 1, 1928, the Court acquitted the Cuccia brothers for lack of evidence. However, he was sentenced to 11 years and 8 months imprisonment for criminal conspiracy and was released from prison in 1937.

== Portella della Ginestra massacre ==
Cuccia has also been mentioned as one of the mafiosi behind the Portella della Ginestra massacre during a Labour Day manifestation on May 1, 1947, when 11 people were killed and 33 wounded by the bandit Salvatore Giuliano. A few weeks before the massacre, Cuccia and others had asked landowners for money to "put an end to the communists once and for all." They made clear that they were ready to go beyond the traditional acts of Mafia violence that had been used against the socialist peasant movement before the rise of fascism in the early 1920s when six socialist militants had been killed in Piana.

In 1957, at the age of 81, Ciccio Cuccia died at his home in Palermo.

== Sources ==
- Abadinsky, Howard (2010), Organized Crime, Ninth Edition, Belmont: Wadsworth Cengage Learning, ISBN 978-0-495-59966-1
- (in Italian) Caruso, Alfio (2014). I Siciliani, Vicenza: Neri Pozza Editore ISBN 978-88-6559-241-0
- Dickie, John (2004). Cosa Nostra. A history of the Sicilian Mafia, London: Hodder & Stoughton, ISBN 0-340-82435-2
- Duggan, Christopher (1989). Fascism and the Mafia, New Haven: Yale University Press ISBN 0-300-04372-4
- Duggan, Christopher (2008). The Force of Destiny: A History of Italy Since 1796, Houghton Mifflin Harcourt, ISBN 0-618-35367-4
- Fracchia, Joseph (2010). ""Hora": Social Conflicts and Collective Memories in Piana degli Albanesi". Past & Present. 209 (1): 181–222. doi:10.1093/pastj/gtq030.
- Lewis, Norman (1964). The Honoured Society: The Sicilian Mafia Observed, Harmondsworth: Penguin Books
- Newark, Tim (2007). Mafia Allies. The True Story of America’s Secret Alliance with the Mob in World War II, Saint Paul (MN): Zenith Press, ISBN 0-7603-2457-3
- (in Italian) Petrotta, Francesco (2010). La strage e i depistaggi: Il castello d’ombre su Portella della Ginestra, Rome: Ediesse, ISBN 978-88-230-1396-4
- Raab, Selwyn (2005). Five Families: The Rise, Decline, and Resurgence of America's Most Powerful Mafia Empires, New York: Thomas Dunne Books, ISBN 978-0-312-30094-4
