= Castronovo di Sicilia =

- Comune
- Comune di Castronovo di Sicilia
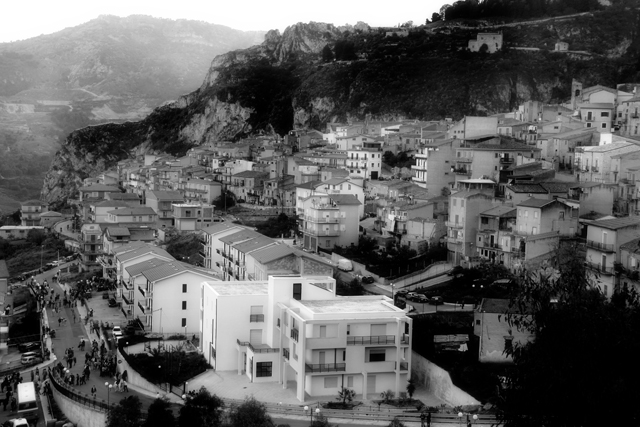

- Coat of arms

- Location within Italy Location within Sicily
- Coordinates: 37°40′N 13°36′E
- Country: Italy
- Region: Sicily
- Metropolitan city: Palermo (PA)
- Frazioni: Marcatobianco

Government
  - Mayor: Vito Sinatra

Area
  - Total: 201.04 km^{2} (77.62 sq mi)
- Elevation: 660 m (2,170 ft)

Population (30 November 2021)
  - Total: 2,865 ▼
  - Density: 14.25/km^{2} (36.91/sq mi)
- Demonym: Castronovesi
- Time zone: UTC+1 (CET)
  - Summer (DST): UTC+2 (CEST)
- Postal code: 90030
- Dialing code: 091
- Patron saint: Vitale (Note: Unofficial)
- Saint day: March 9
- Website: Official website

Castronovo di Sicilia (Sicilian: Castrunovu) is a comune (municipality) in the Metropolitan City of Palermo in the Italian Autonomous Region of Sicily, located about 50 kilometres (31 mi) southeast of Palermo.

== Etymology ==
Castronovo di Sicilia, alternatively spelled as "Castronuovo" possibly derives its name from medieval Latin castrum, meaning "fortress", and nuovo meaning "new". Càstro also translates to "castle" in Corsican, an Italian dialect similar to Sicilian.

== History ==
The land surrounding Castronovo di Sicilia has been occupied since antiquity, with excavations having uncovered pottery dating back to the fifth century BCE. The area is rumored to be the site of the ancient Sicani city of Crastus. Historians believe that the Falaride tribe of Agrigento had a fortress built that marked the limit between the Carthaginian, Agrigento and Syracuse (Greek) territories. The settlement was demolished by Roman occupiers in retaliation for slave revolts during the servile wars around 105 BCE. The surviving population of Crastus dispersed over the entire territory of present-day Castronovo.

Castronovo likely gets its name from the nearby Castello di Castronovo di Sicilia, a fortress complex fortified by Byzantine occupiers during the Muslim conquest of Sicily. In 1154, the site was recorded by Arab cartographer Muhammad al-Idrisi as Qasr nubu. Government records describe the settlement known as "Il Cassero" or "Kassar" as a "partially Hellenized indigenous settlement then occupied in the Middle Ages." The fortification lies directly above a castle occupied by Roman, Byzantine, Arab, and Norman elites over the centuries, now known as Colle San Vitale. Historians have attributed, with "acceptable certainty", a nearby bridge to the Roman period. Liturgical records indicate that Jordan, son of Norman conqueror Roger I, captured the fort (recorded as "Castrum Novum") on his way to capture Muslim Syracuse.
