= Ficuzza =

- Frazione
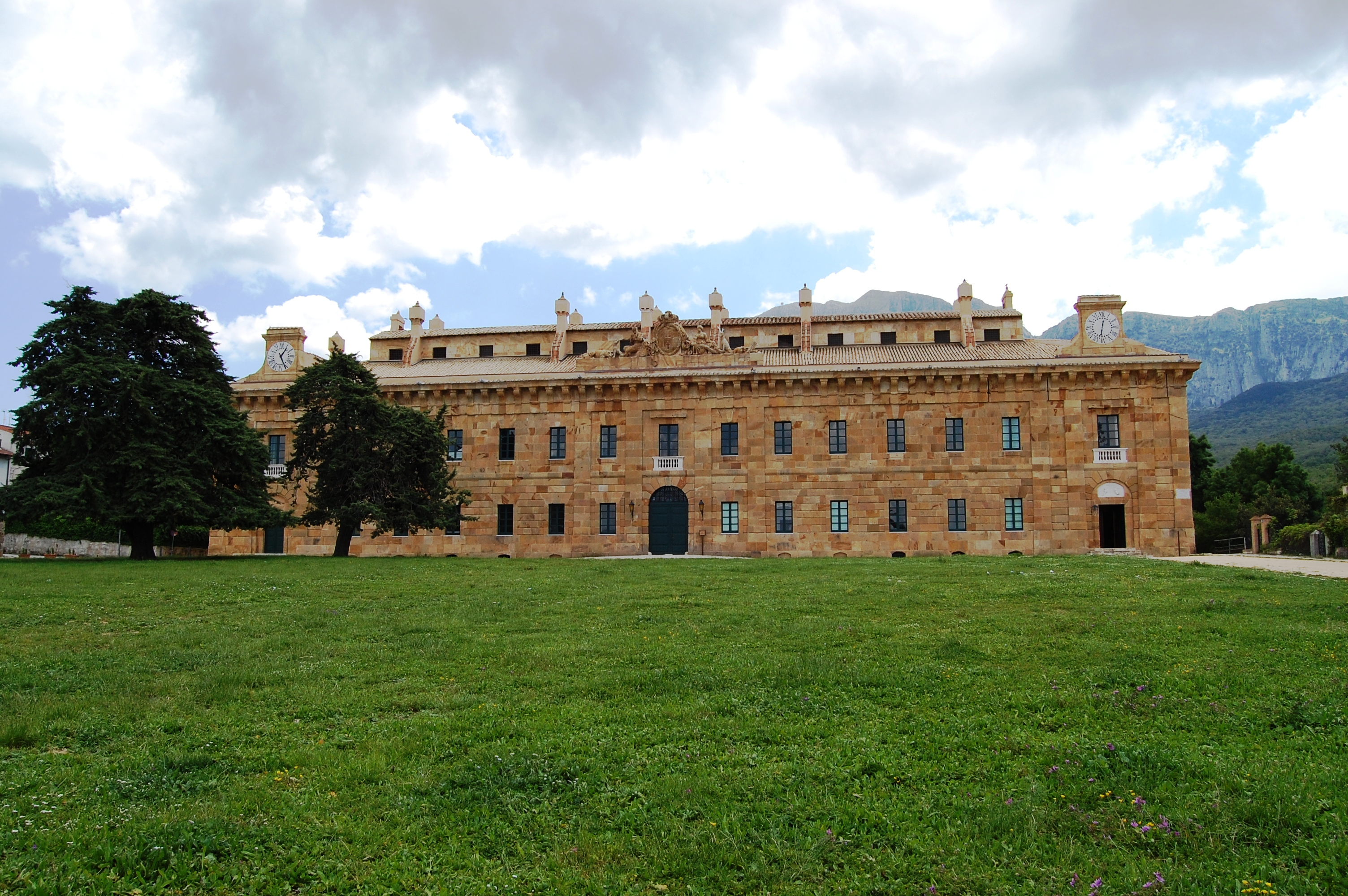
- The Royal Palace of Ficuzza

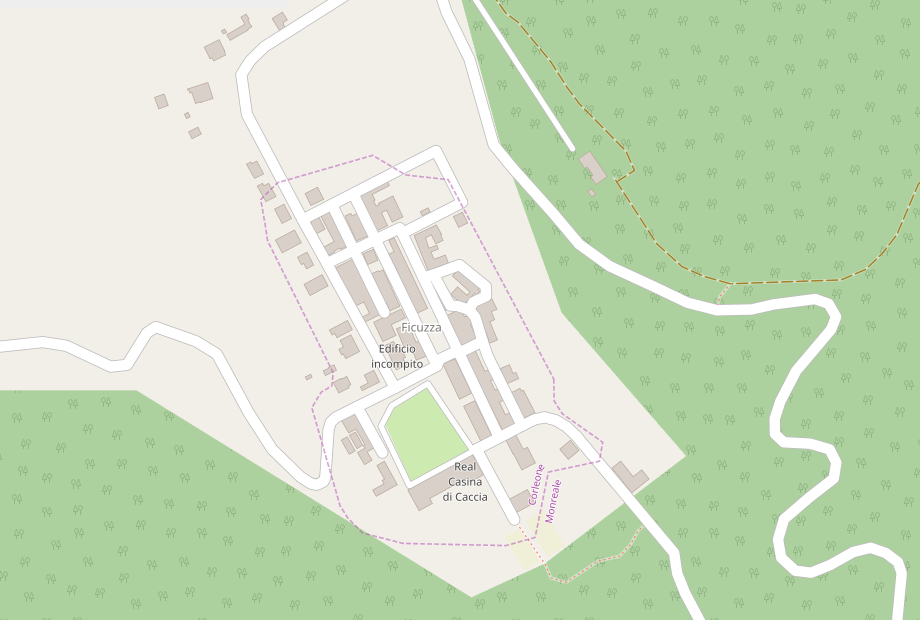
- OSM map of Ficuzza showing the municipal border of the enclave, the wood (green) and the Royal Palace (light green)

- Location of Ficuzza in Italy
- Coordinates: 37°53′0″N 13°22′40″E
- Country: Italy
- Region: Sicily
- Province: Palermo (PA)
- Comune: Corleone
- Elevation: 683 m (2,241 ft)

Population (2011)
  - Total: 112
- Demonym: Ficuzzani
- Time zone: UTC+1 (CET)
  - Summer (DST): UTC+2 (CEST)
- Postal code: 90034
- Dialing code: (+39) 091
- Patron saint: Saint Rosalia
- Saint day: September 4

Ficuzza is a southern Italian village and hamlet (frazione) of Corleone, a municipality in the Metropolitan City of Palermo, Sicily. in 2011 it had a population of 112.

== History ==
Originally a fief belonging to the clergy, the foundation of the settlement is closely related to its Royal Palace (Italian: Real Casina di Caccia di Ficuzza), a hunting lodge commissioned by Ferdinand I of the Two Sicilies in 1799, started in 1802 and completed in 1807. From 1810 the king lived there until 1813.

In early 20th century, Ficuzza became a favorite holiday destination for the nobility of Palermo, and was declared a climatic health resort in 1901. The request for the granting of state-owned land, in order to build new residences, grew over the years; but the Regional Administration of Forests and State Property of the Sicilian Region rejected the concessions, and the building development of the little village stopped.

== Geography ==
Ficuzza, located 43 km (27 mi) south of Palermo, lies below Rocca Busambra, the highest peak of the Sicani Mountains; and close to the Bosco della Ficuzza (i.e. "Ficuzza Forest"). The village represents, along with the municipal territories of San Cipirello and San Giuseppe Jato, an enclave in the municipality of Monreale.

It is 10 km (6.2 mi) from Godrano, the nearest settlement, 13 km (8.1 mi) from Marineo and Cefalà Diana, 16 km (9.9 mi) from Villafrati, 17 km (11 mi) from Corleone and Santa Cristina Gela, 20 km (12 mi) from Piana degli Albanesi, and 40 km (25 mi) from Monreale.

== Main sights ==
- Royal Palace of Ficuzza: a hunting lodge commissioned by Ferdinand I of the Two Sicilies in 1799.
- Bosco della Ficuzza: a large forest and nature reserve in the Sicani Mountains.
- The railway station, built in 1884 and working, until 1959, on the former Palermo-Corleone-San Carlo line, was restored and is nowadays a restaurant. The former track route is a cycleway and a pedestrian trail.

== Gallery ==
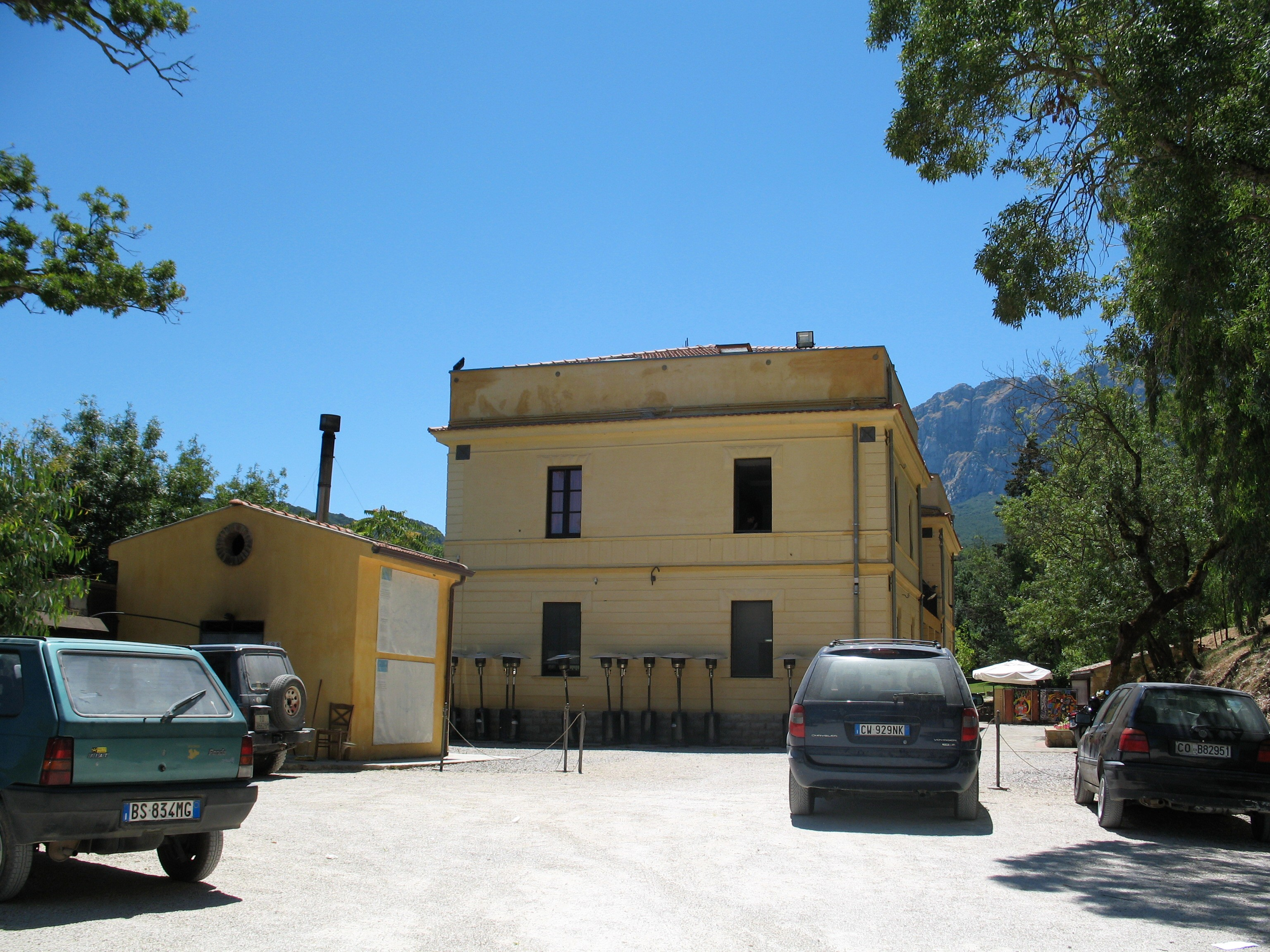
The station building

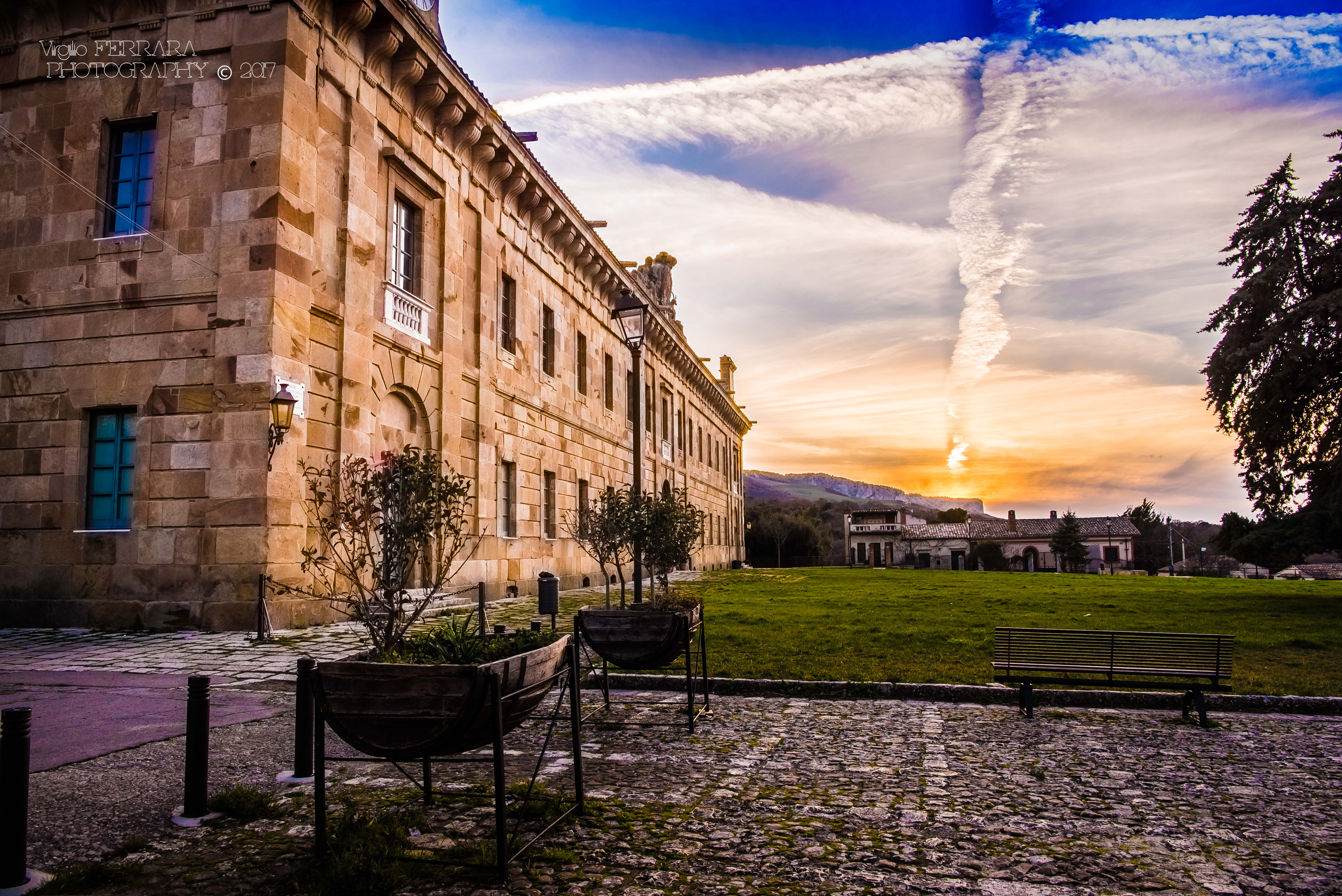
Sunset at the Royal Palace

== Popular culture ==
Ficuzza was the set of an episode ("Tore", 1x04) of the Italian TV series The Mafia Kills Only in Summer, based on the homonym film by Pierfrancesco Diliberto. In the episode, focusesd on the murder of the trade union leader Placido Rizzotto, it was shown the little village and the surrounding forest.
