= Monte Barraù =

Mountain in Italy

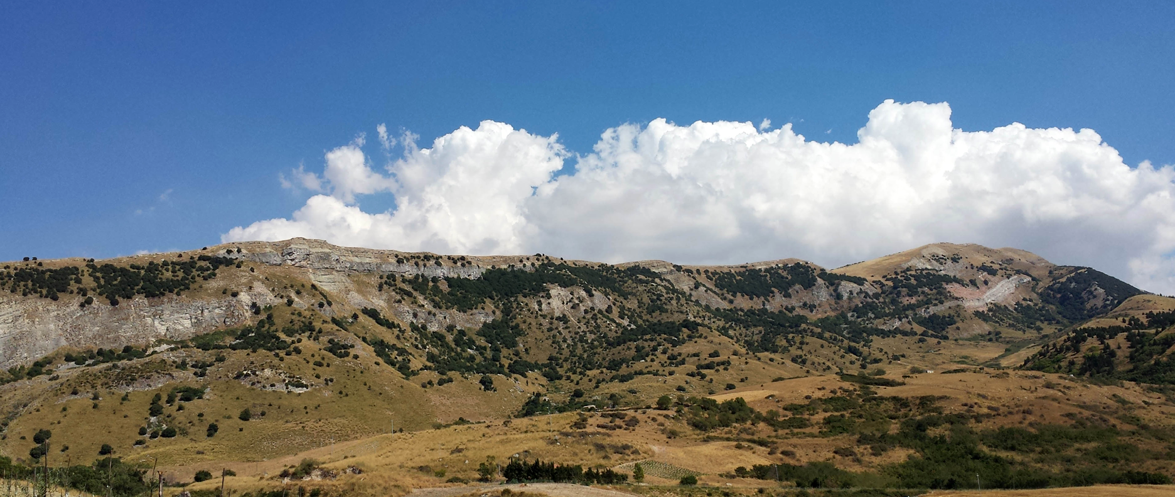
- Western slope of Monte Barraù

Highest point
- Elevation: 1,420 m (4,660 ft)
- Coordinates: 37°45′N 13°19′E

Geography
- Location within Italy
- Location: Sicily, southern Italy
- Parent range: Monti Sicani

Monte Barraù (also known as Monte Barracù) is a mountain in the Monti Sicani, in Sicily, southern Italy. It has an elevation of 1,420 metres (4,659 ft), giving it the fourth highest elevation in the Monti Sicani after Rocca Busambra, Monte Cammarata and Monte delle Rose.

== Etymology ==
The mountain's name is derived from the Arabic ra’s e ĝabal bū ‘r-rahū, Latinized as Burrachu.

== Description ==
Monte Barraù has a rather sloped relief, characterized by tertiary clay deposits and Mesozoic carbonates that present sometimes sub-vertical walls with significant rock outcrops and frequent collapses.

== Environment ==
Monte Barraù is rich with spring waters and forests dominated by evergreen oak; secondary aspects are represented by shrublands and xerophilous grasslands. A recent archaeological research expedition led to the identification of twelve sites featuring pottery concentrations spanning from the Middle Copper Age and Bronze Age, the Classic period, and the Middle Ages to the Late Modern period. Also identified were four areas with dry-stone structures related to Late Modern Age pastoral activities.

The relief is included in a Special Area of Conservation under directives Natura 2000 code ITA020037.
