= The Mafia Kills Only in Summer =

The Mafia Kills Only in Summer may refer to:

- The Mafia Kills Only in Summer (film)
- The Mafia Kills Only in Summer (TV series)
