= The Mafia Kills Only in Summer (TV series) =

Italian television series

- Italian: La mafia uccide solo d'estate
- Genre: Comedy-drama; Period drama
- Created by: Pif; Michele Astori; Michele Pellegrini
- Based on: The Mafia Kills Only in Summer (2013); by Pif
- Directed by: Luca Ribuoli
- Starring: Claudio Gioè; Anna Foglietta; Francesco Scianna; Valentina D'Agostino; Angela Curri; Edoardo Buscetta; Nino Frassica
- Theme music composer: Santi Pulvirenti
- Country of origin: Italy
- Original languages: Italian; Sicilian
- No. of series: 2
- No. of episodes: 24 (list of episodes)

Production
- Running time: 50 minutes

Original release
- Network: Rai 1
- Release: 21 November 2016 – May 31, 2018

The Mafia Only Kills in Summer (Italian: La mafia uccide solo d'estate) is an Italian 2016 television series written by Pif, directed by Luca Ribuoli, produced and broadcast by RAI. Based on the eponymous 2013 film, also directed by Pif, it was first aired on Rai 1 from 21 November to 20 December 2016. In the United Kingdom the series was broadcast by Channel 4.

== Plot ==
The voice-over narrator of the series is an adult, Salvatore Giammarresi (Pif), who tells the story of his life as a 10-year-old boy growing up in an ordinary family in Palermo during the late 1970s. Salvatore's family consists of his upright father Lorenzo (a clerk and later manager in Parlermo's residents' registration office and later in the regional administration of Sicily), his sensitive mother Pia (a substitute teacher waiting for years being installed as a permanent) and his naive 16-year-old sister Angela (a high school student). Part of the family is also Pia's carefree brother Massimo (a Vicebrigadiere forestale or Sergeant in the forest police turning into mafioso), who marries sexy but good-hearted cafe owner Patrizia.

The ordinary events from the kid's point of view are mixed with historical facts, primarily regarding the Sicilian Mafia (Cosa Nostra), which unfairly dominated the city in that period. Combining reality with TV fiction, there are various storylines related to the Sack of Palermo, to the personal friendship of Salvatore with Boris Giuliano or Mario Francese (both killed by the Mafia in 1979), etc.

The series is set during 1979 and 1980, although within the fiction there are flashbacks in which the narration develops in earlier periods.

== Cast ==
- Claudio Gioè as Lorenzo Giammarresi
- Anna Foglietta as Pia Melfi Giammarresi
- Nino Frassica as Father Giacinto
- Francesco Scianna as Massimo Melfi
- Angela Curri as Angela Giammarresi
- Edoardo Buscetta as Salvatore Giammarresi
  - Pif as Salvatore Giammarresi (adult, voice-over narrator)
- Maurizio Bologna as Vito Ciancimino
- Valentina D'Agostino as Patrizia
- Nicola Rignanese as Boris Giuliano
- Gaetano Bruno as Antonio Ayala
- Carmelo Galati as Cusumano
- Dario Aita as Rosario
- Andrea Castellana as Alice Guarneri
- Domenico Centamore as Salvatore Riina
- Sergio Vespertino as Tommaso Buscetta
- Claudia Gusmano as Marina Micciché
- Natale Russo as Gaetano Badalamenti
- Roberto Burgio as Mario Francese
- Claudio Collovà as Filadelfio Aparo
- Ottavio Amato as Salvo Lima
- Enrico Gippetto as Fofò
- Alessandro Piavani as Marco
- Pierangelo Gullo as Sebastiano
- Francesca Giordano as Santina
- Aurora Quattrocchi as grandma Ninetta Melfi
- Adriano Chiaramida as grandad Salvatore Melfi
- Mimmo Mignemi as Musumeci
- Ilenia D'Avenia as a teacher
- Maurizio Marchetti as Nino Salvo
- Orio Scaduto as Ignazio Salvo
- Dajana Roncione as Jolanda Rubino
- Mario Patanè as Pellerito
- Pierluigi Misasi as Gaetano Costa
- Antonio Puccia as Piersanti Mattarella
- Antonio Alveario as Rocco Chinnici
- Vincent Riotta as Michele Greco
- Claudio Castrogiovanni as Stefano Bontate
- Rosario Lisma as Carmelo Iannì
- Simona Malato as the mother of Giuseppe Letizia

== Episodes ==
=== Season 1 (2016) ===
Episode (overall)	Episode (season)	Title	Original air date
1	1	La mafia non esiste	21 November 2016
2	2	Fideiussioni e minchiate varie	21 November 2016
3	3	Uomini del Colorado	28 November 2016
4	4	Tore	28 November 2016
5	5	Anche i mafiosi vanno in paradiso	6 December 2016
6	6	Liggio + 2	6 December 2016
7	7	Un cornuto e mezzo	13 December 2016
8	8	Milinciane ammuttunate	13 December 2016
9	9	Picciuli e piruocchi	19 December 2016
10	10	Difendere la democrazia	19 December 2016
11	11	Gente di parola	20 December 2016
12	12	Piccoli eroi	20 December 2016

=== Season 2 (2018) ===
Soon after the season 1 finale, Pif declared that he was working to write the second season, and confirmed that it will be aired in 2018.

Episode (overall)	Episode (season)	Title	Original air date
13	1	L'apostolo rosa	26 April 2018
14	2	Pezzo di fango e cornuto	26 April 2018
15	3	Santuzze e pitonesse	3 May 2018
16	4	Finché c'è disperazione c'è speranza	3 May 2018
17	5	Rime baciate	10 May 2018
18	6	Carbone per il presidente	10 May 2018
19	7	Bulli e pupe	17 May 2018
20	8	La mafia è un parallelepipedo	17 May 2018
21	9	Un fatto di chimica	24 May 2018
22	10	La fortuna è lieve	24 May 2018
23	11	L'inno del carrubo	31 May 2018
24	12	Il posto dei civili	31 May 2018

=== Possible future seasons ===
Interviewed in April 2018, Pif discussed about the possibility of future seasons, because his intent is to narrate the events occurred in Palermo at least until the ones of 1992 (Capaci and Via D'Amelio bombings), as it happened in the 2013 film.

== Locations ==
The series is set mainly in Palermo, in which sometimes are also shown various cultural heritage sites, typical cuisine products or suburban boroughs as Mondello. Part of some episodes is set in various locations of the province as Partinico, Isola delle Femmine, Ficuzza, Corleone, the Garcia Dam and the mount Rocca Busambra.

The fiction was shot between Sicily and Lazio, principally at Civita Castellana, a town of the Province of Viterbo.

== See also ==
- The Mafia Kills Only in Summer (2013 film)
