= Mount Cammarata =

Mountain in Italy

- Location within Italy

Highest point
- Elevation: 1,578 m (5,177 ft)
- Prominence: 876 m (2,874 ft)
- Coordinates: 37°37′09″N 13°36′28″E

Geography
- Country: Italy
- Region: Sicily
- Parent range: Monti Sicani

Mount Cammarata is a mountain in the province of Agrigento, in Sicily. It is the second highest peak of Monti Sicani after Rocca Busambra. It is located in the commons of Cammarata and San Giovanni Gemini.

== Name ==
Certified since the 1st century as Gemellos Colles, its etymology derives from the orographic conformation with two peaks in relation to that of the near mount Gemini (1397 metres).

== Description ==
The peak can be visited following a 10-mile drive after joining the provincial road connecting Cammarata and Santo Stefano Quisquina. Thanks to its pyramidal shape and orographic position of this mountain, they have built some TV antennas which transmit in different Sicilian provinces. On clear days, the peak of Etna can be seen to the east, the mountain chain of Madonie, Monte San Calogero, and a view of the Tyrrhenian Sea on the north. On the west, there are Rocca Busambra, the mountains of Palermo, and those of Trapani province. On the south, the mountain range of Sicani with Monte delle Rose and the shores of Mediterranean Sea can be seen.
