= On Our Watch =

2021 comedy-drama film

- Directed by: Pif
- Screenplay by: Pif; Michele Astori
- Produced by: Lorenzo Gangarossa; Mario Gianani; Lorenzo Mieli
- Starring: Fabio De Luigi; Ilenia Pastorelli; Pif
- Cinematography: Manfredo Archinto
- Edited by: Ilaria Fraioli
- Music by: Santi Pulvirenti
- Release date: 2021
- Language: Italian

On Our Watch (Italian: E noi come stronzi rimanemmo a guardare) is a 2021 Italian comedy-drama film co-written and directed by Pif.

== Cast ==
- Fabio De Luigi as Arturo Giammarresi
- Ilenia Pastorelli as Stella/Flora
- Pif as Raffaello
- Valeria Solarino as Lisa
- Maurizio Marchetti as Giampietro/Jean-Pierre
- Eamon Farren as John Fuuber
- Maurizio Lombardi as De Spuches
- Orazio Stracuzzi as D'Orazio
- Elia Schilton as Nicheli
- Elisabetta Coraini as Sonia
- Maurizio Nichetti as Rider
