= Royal Palace of Ficuzza =

Palace in Ficuzza, Italy

- Real Casina di Caccia di Ficuzza
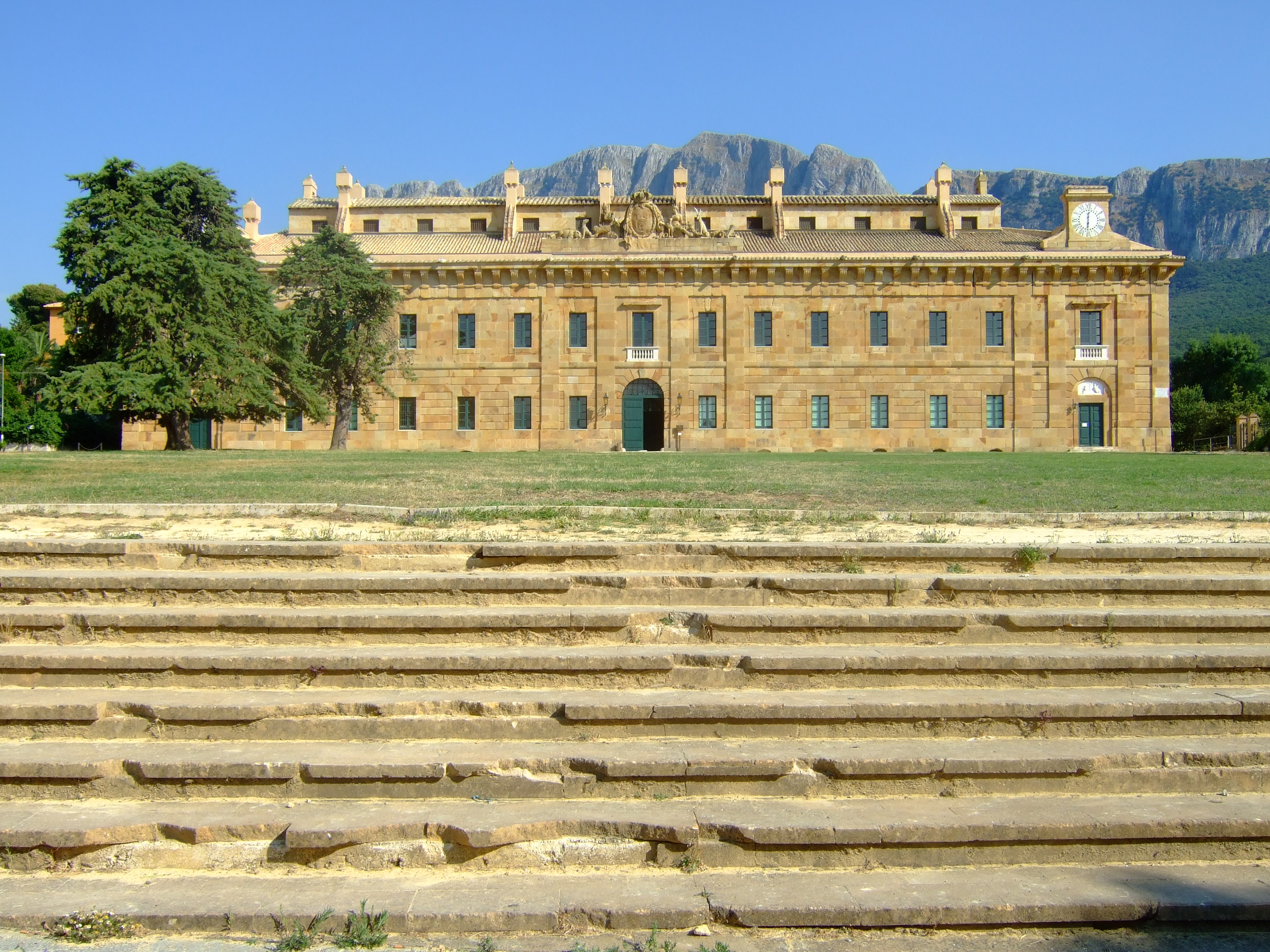
- Royal Palace of Ficuzza façade

- Location within Sicily
- Alternative names: Reggia di Ficuzza

General information
- Status: now used as a museum
- Type: Palace
- Architectural style: Neo-Classical
- Location: Ficuzza (Corleone, Italy)
- Coordinates: 37.8819°N 13.3777°E
- Construction started: 1802
- Completed: 1807
- Client: Ferdinand IV of Naples and III of Sicily

Technical details
- Floor count: 3

Design and construction
- Architects: Carlo Chenchi, Giuseppe Venanzio Marvuglia

The Royal Palace of Ficuzza, also named Reggia or Real Casina di Caccia (hunting lodge) of Ficuzza is located near the town of Corleone, located some 45 kilometers from Palermo, Sicily. It was commissioned by Ferdinand IV of Naples and III of Sicily during his exile in Sicily starting after the establishment of the Parthenopean Republic in 1798.

== History ==
Ferdinand returned to the mainland but was then exiled again by French forces, and his Kingdom of Naples was ruled by Joachim Murat till 1815. He had the palace built near the royal hunting reserve in 1802, and it was completed in 1810. The designers included the engineer Carlo Chenchi and later the Neoclassical architect Giuseppe Venanzio Marvuglia. Among those completing the fresco decoration were Giuseppe Velasco and B. Cotardi.

Ultimately, with the fall of the Bourbons, the house fell into disuse and was subject to depredation by various owners and hosts, including occupying armies during World War II. The palace has recently been opened to visitors, including the tunnels that lead into the surrounding forest.

The austere exteriors of the palace harmonize with one of its roles as a hunting lodge. Some of the interiors, however, have decorative flourishes, such as Egyptian-style columns. The entire ensemble has a spirit of wasteful frivolity, given that it was commissioned by a king in exile ruling a crumbling monarchy and an impoverished kingdom during the age of the Napoleonic Wars.
