= At War with Love =

2016 italian movie directed by Pif

In guerra per amore
- Directed by: Pif
- Produced by: Mario Gianani; Lorenzo Mieli; Fausto Brizzi
- Starring: Pif; Miriam Leone
- Music by: Santi Pulvirenti
- Release date: 27 October 2016 (Italy)
- Running time: 99 minutes
- Country: Italy
- Language: Italian

At War with Love (Italian: In guerra per amore) is a 2016 Italian comedy film directed by Pif.

== Plot ==
New York, 1943. Arturo Giammarresi is a Palermitan who emigrated to America. He is in love with Flora Guarneri, Alfredo's niece, owner of the restaurant where Arturo works as a waiter.

Arturo, however, learns that Flora has already been promised by his uncle Alfredo to Carmelo, son of the mafia boss Don Tano, right-hand man of Lucky Luciano. Flora suggests to Arturo that he directly ask for the hand of his father, the only one capable of opposing his uncle's will: however, his father is in Sicily. Arturo accepts the proposal, and to seal it, he takes a self-portrait with Flora against the background of the Brooklyn Bridge, to take the photograph with him to Sicily and show it to Flora's father.

Arturo asks for a glass of "water" in a bar, but pronounces it "war" (which had previously made him look bad at the restaurant), in the presence of an army officer who, curious, asks him if he is Sicilian, advising him to enlist because they are looking for Sicilians in view of the landing on the island. Arturo enlists, but given his ineptitude he is relegated to managing the pack donkeys.

Meanwhile, in Sicily, the two rascals Saro Cupane and Mimmo Passalacqua, one blind and the other lame, on lookout on the rocks of the coast, observe the landing of the Americans and try to warn the inhabitants of the nearby town of Crisafulo of the danger. The Americans bomb civilian homes, causing death and destruction. Once the landing is complete, the first contact with the country's mafia takes place. Don Calò, the boss who has power over Crisafullo, assures Commander Vincent Maone that in a short time all the soldiers will surrender and that the country will welcome the American liberators with joy.

So it happens, and Commander Maone is therefore awaiting the release of the list of mafiosi given the precious collaboration given, and which must be delivered by a specially parachuted OSS agent: Lieutenant Philip Catelli. However, during the launch, he fell on a girl's bed and his father, in a rage, imprisoned the lieutenant in his cottage. General Patton then orders that the soldier in the most useless role be sent to rescue Catelli. Thus Arturo is called to service, tied to a rope together with a donkey, and transported towards Crisafullo. With great astonishment, the villagers then see a donkey fly: Arturo is thrown, together with the donkey, near the cottage where Lieutenant Catelli was captured. Misfortune has it that he too falls into the bed of the immaculate maiden, and is therefore sometimes surprised by his even more enraged father. He shares his imprisonment with Lieutenant Catelli until their release by Maone.

Meanwhile, in New York, Don Tano plans the killing of Arturo together with his son Carmelo, and sends Don Calò a letter with the personal details of the case. Flora, who is waiting only for Arturo's return from Sicily, finds a way to delay the wedding with Carmelo.

Meanwhile Arturo searches in vain for Flora's father, of whom he only knows that he lives in Crisafullo; Saro and Mimmo lend themselves to help him, and thanks to Arturo they avoid being shot, having been caught stealing a pair of shoes from a dead American soldier. Shooting sentence that appears incomprehensible even to Lieutenant Catelli, given that his boss Maone, now in possession of the list of mafiosi prepared by Lucky Luciano, frees murderers, extortionists and thieves.

Arturo has become a friend of Catelli whose loyalty and courage he admires in reporting to Maone that they are freeing delinquents, borrowing his officer's jacket from the lieutenant to make a good impression on Flora's parents. This favors Arturo who, by showing the photograph with Flora under the Brooklyn bridge, obtains consent to the wedding, but damages Catelli who, taking Arturo's place, is mistaken for him and killed by order of Don Calò, while false witnesses claim that it was the Germans. But by then the mafiosi were close to power and Don Calò was appointed mayor under the aegis of a recently established political party: the Christian Democrats.

Inspired by Arturo, Mimmo declares himself to Saro, but both believe that, to avoid problems with the society of the time, it is better to continue being friends and roommates.

Throughout Sicily, the alliance between American soldiers and mobsters brings lucrative business. The boss Calogero Vizzini is elected mayor of Villalba, while the future mafioso and politician of the Christian Democrats Vito Ciancimino starts working in the municipality of Palermo. Looking after the financial interests between American and Sicilian soldiers, also taking into account the interests of the mafia, is the banker Michele Sindona, future 'banker of Cosa nostra'.

Arturo returns to the United States bringing with him the letter of denunciation of collusion with the Mafia that Catelli had addressed to President Franklin Delano Roosevelt. He personally delivers it to the White House guard post and sits on a bench confidently waiting for the president's reaction, but doesn't call himself. Meanwhile Flora receives a letter from Arturo, warning her that they can get married but he is in Washington. Flora, who is about to marry Carmelo, runs away from home and joins Arturo in Washington.

== Cast ==
- Pif as Arturo Giammarresi
- Miriam Leone as Flora Guarneri
- Andrea Di Stefano as Philip Catelli
- Stella Egitto as Teresa
- Vincent Riotta as James Maone
- Maurizio Marchetti as Don Calò
- Mario Pupella as Don Tano
- Aurora Quattrocchi as Annina
- Samuele Segreto as Sebastiano
