= Abbey of San Martino delle Scale =

Benedictine monastery and church in Sicily, Italy

Coordinates: 38.0910°N 13.2545°E

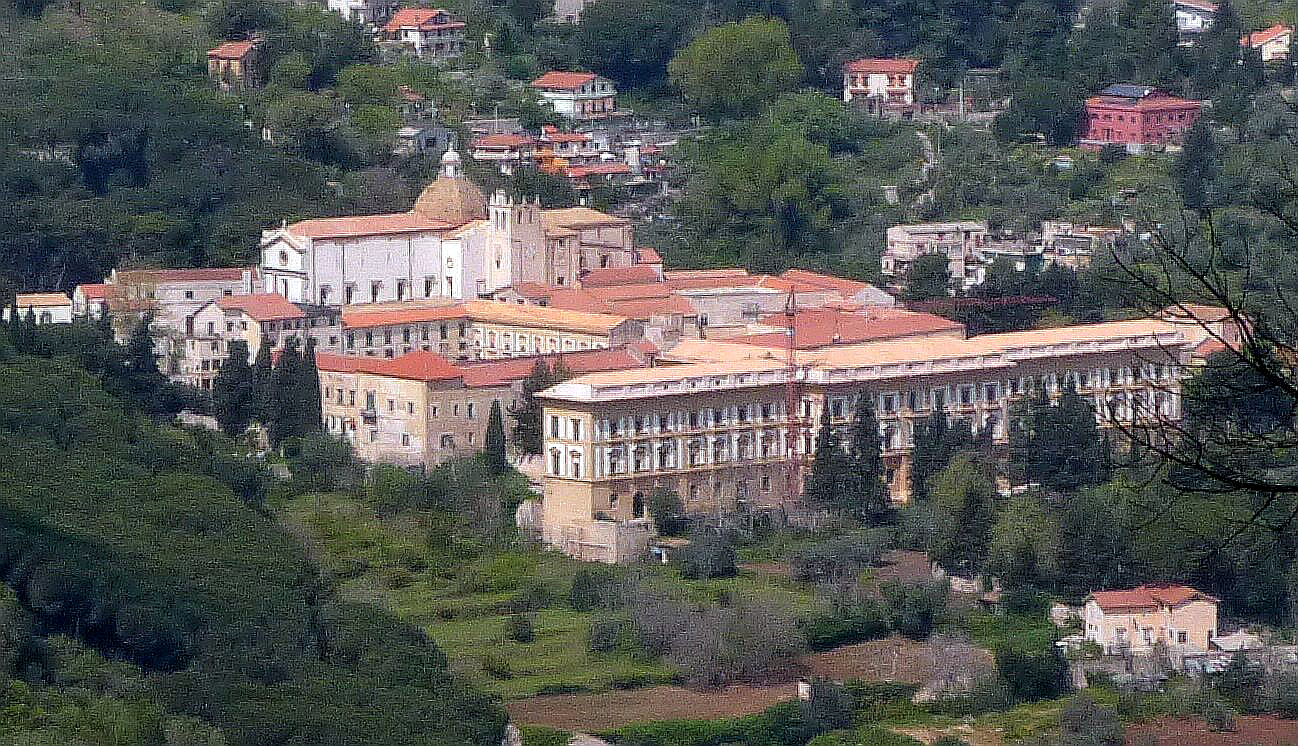
View of the abbey and church

The Abbey of San Martino delle Scale is a Benedictine monastery and church located in the hills a few kilometers northwest of Monreale, region of Sicily, Italy. Putatively founded in the 7th-century, but destroyed by the Saracens, it was refounded in 1347. Most of the present structures date to the 17th and 18th-centuries, including a large refurbishment by the architect Giuseppe Venanzio Marvuglia.

The Abbazia or abbey is located in between Monte Cuccio and Monte Caputo. Putatively founded during the rule of Pope Gregory the Great, a monastery at the site was destroyed by the Saracens. The monastery, dedicated to St Martin of Tours, was reformulated in 1347 with 6 monks from the Monastery of San Nicola near Mount Etna. Among the first monks was the blessed Angelo Sinisio, the first abbott, who helped commission the first monastic buildings.

The church was decorated with works by Pietro Novelli, Filippo Paladini, Zoppo di Gangi, Paolo de Matteis, Mattias Stomer and others. The intricately carved wooden choir stalls were completed by the early 18th century. The fontana dell’Oreto and the sculptural depiction of St Martin on horseback were carved by Ignazio Marabitti.

Nearly abandoned after the suppression of the orders in 1866, the abbey is still a benedictine monastery.

== See also ==
- 16th-century Western domes
