= Rocky Segretta =

Italian American football player (1899–1953)

No. 19
- Position: End

Personal information
- Born: April 24, 1899; Monreale, Italy
- Died: July 9, 1953 (aged 54)

Career information
- College: none

Career history
- Hartford Blues (1926); Bristol West Ends (1926)

Career statistics
- Games Played: 1
- Stats at Pro Football Reference

Rocco Francis Segretta (April 24, 1899 – July 9, 1953) was an American football end who played one game for the Hartford Blues in 1926. He wore number 19. He also played for another team, the Bristol West Ends.
