= Giuseppe Venanzio Marvuglia =

Italian architect (1729–1814)

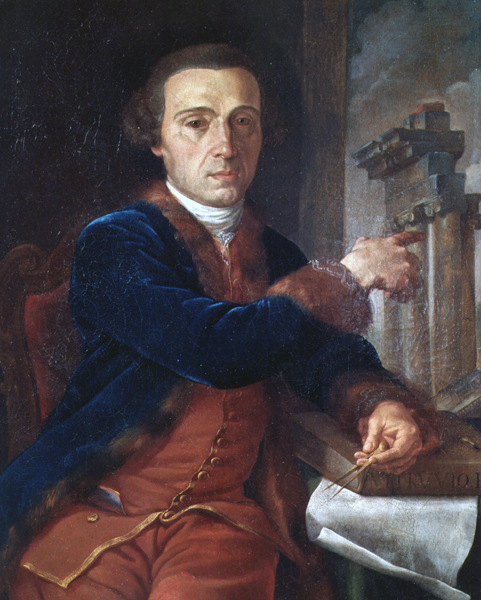
Portrait of Giuseppe Venanzio Marvuglia

Giuseppe Venanzio Marvuglia (6 February 1729 – 19 December 1814) was an Italian architect.

== Biography ==
Marvuglia received his first training in his native Palermo. This was followed by a stay in Rome from 1747 to 1759. By the end of his time there, a handful of progressive young architects and designers in the circuit of the French Academy in Rome were moving away from the ornate Baroque towards a simpler, more classical form of architecture under the influence of the antiquarian and architect Winckelmann, a protégé of Cardinal Alessandro Albani.

Marvuglia's design of a town square won the second prize in a contest organised by the Accademia San Luca. His entry had, at its centre, a circular domed building reminiscent of the Pantheon in Rome, but with Baroque features in its columns and statuary.

Following his return to Sicily, he worked on the rebuilding of the Monastery of San Martino delle Scale, in the mountains near Palermo; however, while Marvuglia's basic design was Baroque in style, the straight clean lines in the plan, as opposed to the curved facades and broken rooflines of typical Sicilian Baroque, are evidence that the tide of fashion was flowing towards Neoclassicism.

Though much of Marvuglia's work was in municipal architecture, two churches are credited to him. One, at the very start of his independent career, is San Filippo Neri (1769), rather than in high Baroque, it is built with a facade divided into three square divisions decorated with panels of bas-relief. The pilasters are flat and plain. The pediments are unbroken. The interior of the church has a gilded barrel vaulted ceiling, supported by great marble columns. What is unusual in the Sicilian Baroque tradition here is that the columns do not support an arcade, but a flat entablature. This church, which 18th-century English visitors much preferred to the ornate Sicilian Baroque, clearly shows the emerging migration from Baroque decoration towards a more sober order.

In his design for the church of San Francesco di Sales, located in Corso Calatafimi of Palermo (1772–76, consecrated 8 May 1818), Marvuglia interpreted a classicizing Palladian program of paired pilasters in the piers of an abbreviated arcade giving onto two pairs of side chapels, supporting an uninterrupted cornice carried entirely round the space, integrating the sober pedimented tabernacle of the high altar, all in a restrained tonality of white and cream that to an early viewer was "semplice e senza ornamenti" ("simple and without ornaments") as indeed it was in the context of Late Baroque Palermo.

As an architect, Marvuglia showed great understanding of proportion and mass. His Palazzo Constantino, a project he took over in 1787, shows a fusion of both the Neoclassical and Palladian. He had the palace decorated by Giuseppe Velasquez. His Palazzo Belmonte Riso (completed in 1784) clearly shows better than any other in Sicily the final days of Sicilian Baroque as it was transformed into Neoclassicism; the unbroken skyline and the plain almost severe pillars and unbroken window pediments, far outweigh the Baroque sentiments in internal arcaded courtyard.

Marvuglia designed two villas at the newly fashionable aristocratic enclave of Bagheria. The Villa Villarosa, while neoclassical in spirit is clearly influenced by the hôtels by Gabriel on the Place Louis XV in Paris. For Ferdinand IV of Naples, forced into temporary residence in Sicily by the republican revolution and the Napoleonic occupation, he designed a whimsical Casina Cinese in the royal park of La Favorita outside Palermo and at Ficuzza a long unbroken block of a severely classical villa with very little relief and an unbroken cornice.

As a teacher of architecture Marvuglia strongly supported the study of Sicily's Greek temples, however, in spite of his later reputation as a Neoclassical architect he never applied to his own work the strict rules and proportions he found in his studies of ancient Greek architecture.

He died in Palermo in 1814.

== Notable works ==
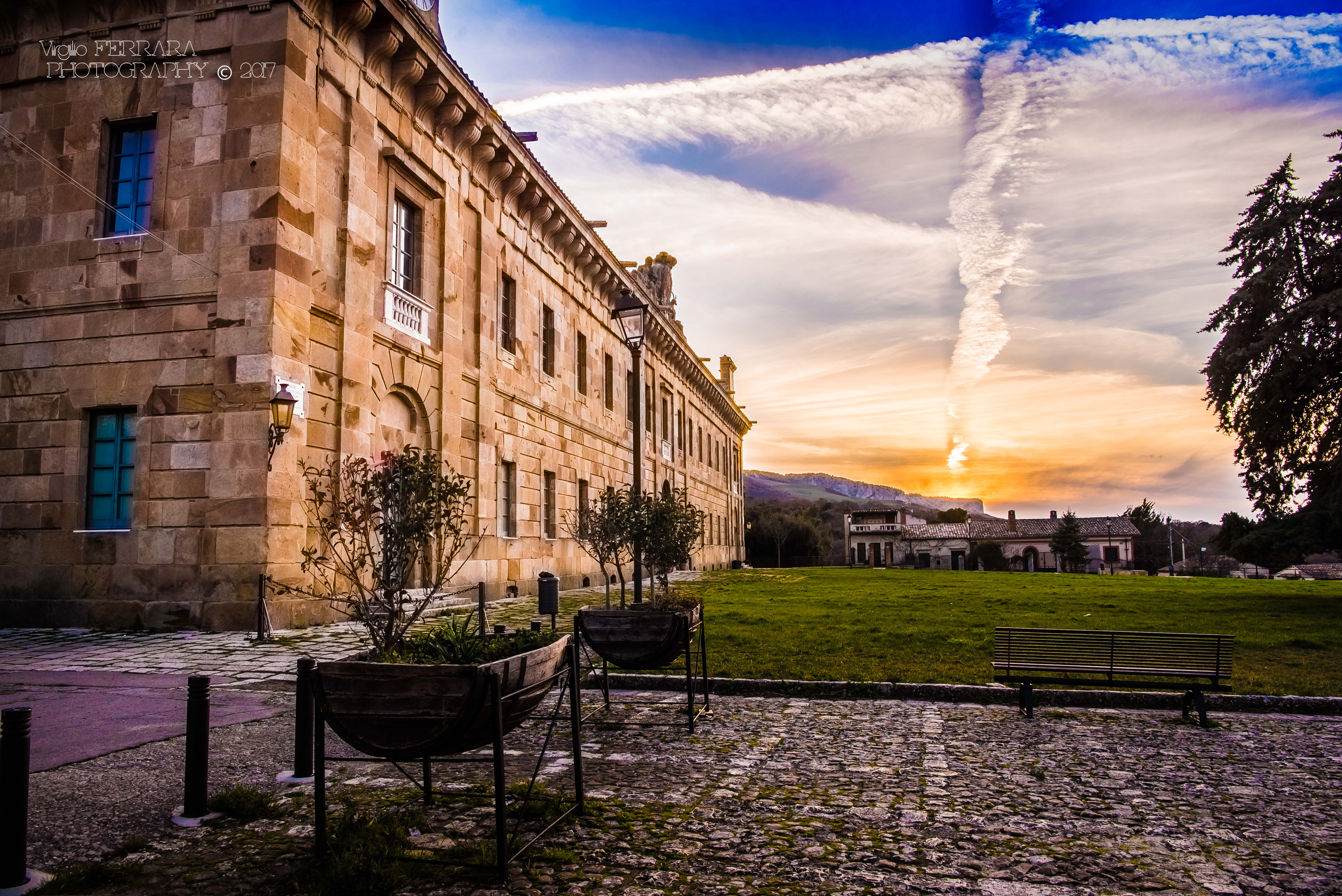
The Royal Palace of Ficuzza

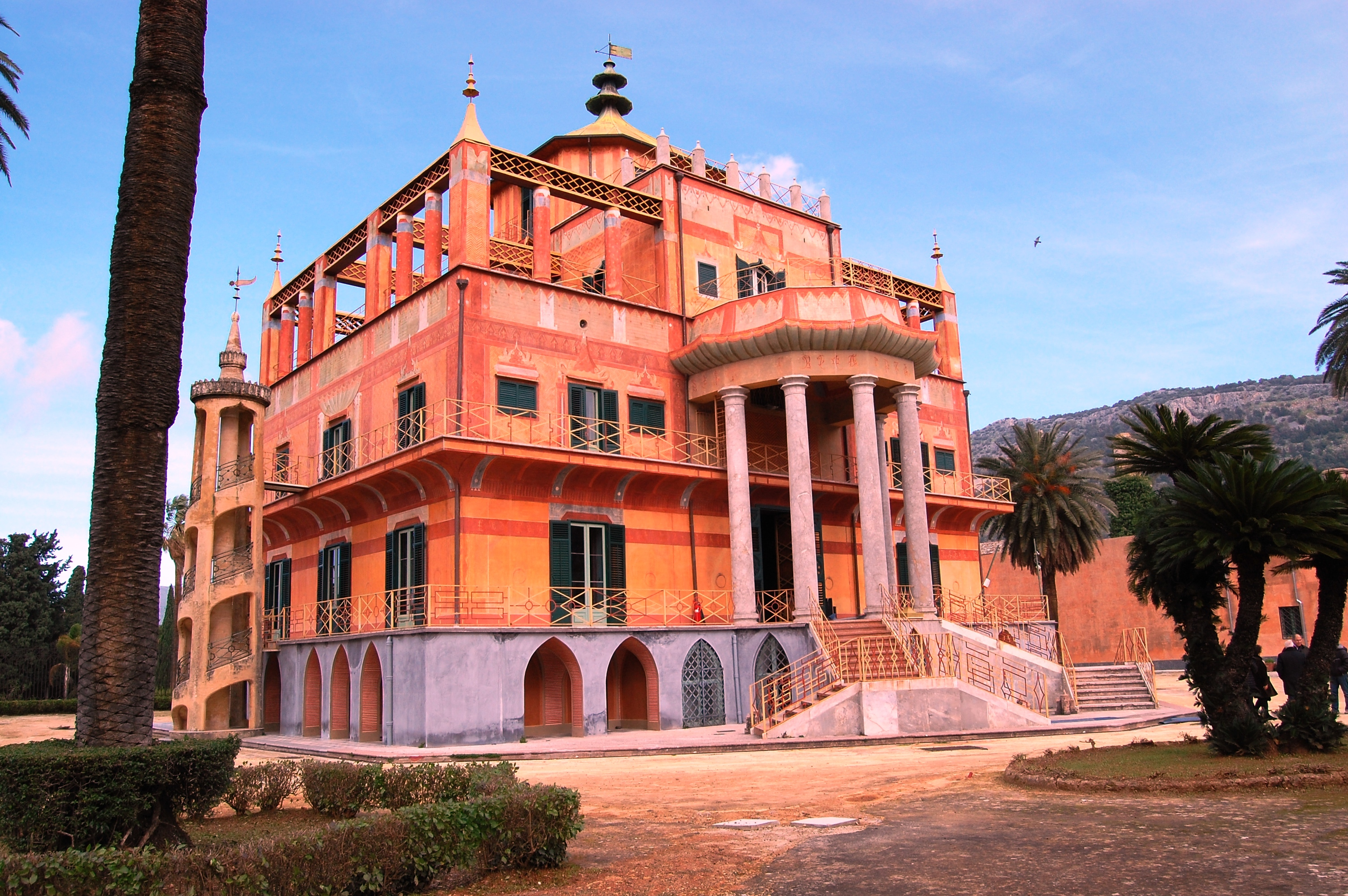
The Chinese Palace
