= Santi Pulvirenti =

Italian composer (born 1973)

- Born: 12 March 1973 (age 52); Catania, Sicily, Italy
- Occupation: Composer

Santi Pulvirenti (born 12 March 1973) is an Italian film score composer and musician.

== Life and career ==
Born in Catania, the first of four children, in 2001 Pulvirenti graduated in physics at the University of Catania. In the second half of the 1990s, he fronted the Uzeda-produced noise band Plank. In 1997, he started a long professional association with Carmen Consoli, collaborating with her for over a decade in studio and tours, as a guitarist and occasionally as a composer. He later also collaborated with Patti Smith, Franco Battiato, Gianna Nannini, Max Gazzè, Tiromancino, Angélique Kidjo, Paola Turci, and Marina Rei, among others.

In the early 2010s, Pulvirenti started scoring several RAI television documentaries. After collaborating on some soundtracks by Paolo Buonvino, in 2013 he made his official debut as film score composer with Pif's The Mafia Kills Only in Summer, getting a David di Donatello nomination for the original song "Tosami lady". In 2017, he received a Nastro d'Argento nomination for best original song for "Donkey Flyin' in the Sky", theme of the film At War with Love. In 2024, he was nominated for David di Donatello for best score for Last Night of Amore.

== Selected filmography ==
- The Mafia Kills Only in Summer (2013)
- Me Romantic Romani (2014)
- People Who Are Well (2014)
- La scuola più bella del mondo (2014)
- Ears (2016)
- At War with Love (2016)
- Just Believe (2018)
- On Our Watch (2021)
- Bang Bang Baby (2022)
- Everyone on Board (2022)
- Still Time (2023)
- Last Night of Amore (2023)
- My Place Is Here (2024)
- The Big Fake (2025)
