= Monti Sicani =

Mountain chain in central Sicily

Coordinates: 37.8167°N 13.1667°E

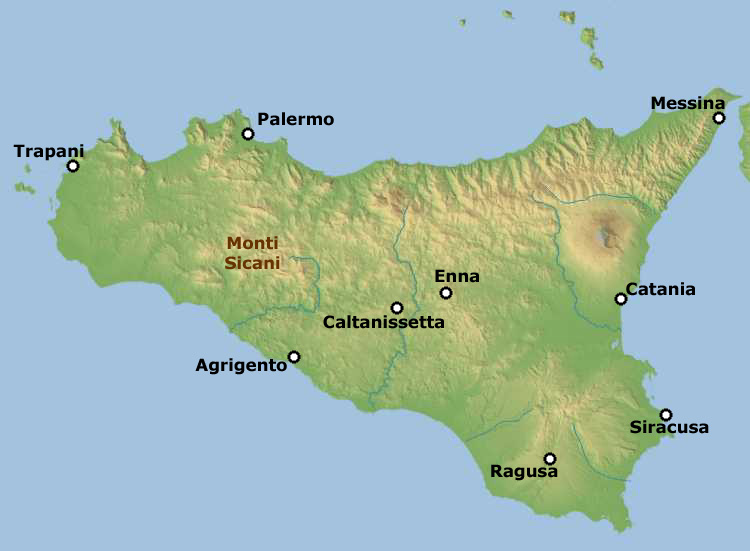
Location of the Monti Sicani in Sicily.

The Monti Sicani are a mountain chain in central-southern Sicily, southern Italy, divided between the provinces of Agrigento and Palermo. The name also indicates a series of municipalities or comuni in the area.

The territory is hilly, with clay and sandstone being the predominant rock, and is used for pasture. It also includes a proper mountain area reaching altitudes above 900 m, with Mesozoic limestone rocks. Peaks over 1,000 m include the Rocca Busambra (1,613 m), Monte delle Rose (1,436 m), Monte Barraù (also called Monte Barracù) (1,420 m) and the Monte Cammarata (1578 m).

== Biodiversity ==
=== Fauna ===
The territory of the Sicani mountains offers different habitats to wildlife that is rich in both vertebrates and invertebrates.

The Sicani mountains are home to several species of birds of prey, such as the golden eagle and Egyptian vulture, constituting their only breeding sites in Sicily. Other, more widespread species include the peregrine falcon, kestrel, and the barn owl.

Amongst reptile species viper, natrice, and land turtle are the most common.

Mammal species include marten, wildcat, and fox.

== See also ==
- Sicani
- Monte delle Rose
