= Garcia Lake =

Lake in Sicily, Italy

Lago Garcia
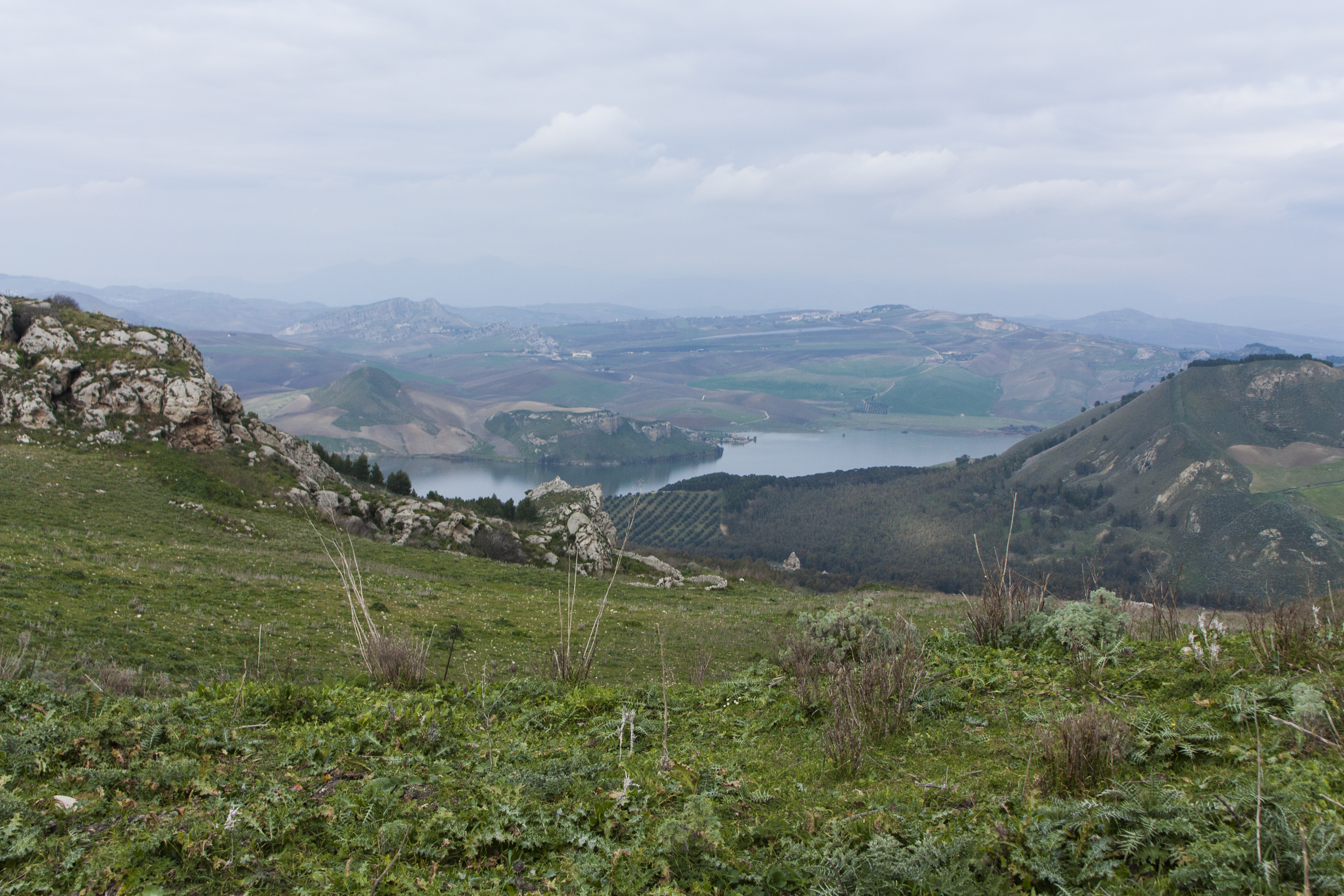

- Location within Sicily
- Location: Province of Palermo, Sicily
- Coordinates: 37.799205°N 13.118277°E
- Primary inflows: Fiume Belice
- Catchment area: 378 km^{2} (146 sq mi)
- Basin countries: Italy
- Surface area: 5.9 km^{2} (2.3 sq mi)
- Average depth: 10.2 m (33 ft)
- Max. depth: 42.8 m (140 ft)
- Water volume: 60,000,000 m^{3} (2.1×10^{9} cu ft)
- Residence time: 0.9 years
- Surface elevation: 198 m (650 ft)

Lago Garcia is a lake in the Province of Palermo, Sicily, Italy. At an elevation of 198 m, its surface area is 5.9 km^{2}. In 1986, it was created by damming the Belice River.
