= Monreale =

Monreale Murriali (Sicilian)
- Comune
- Comune di Monreale
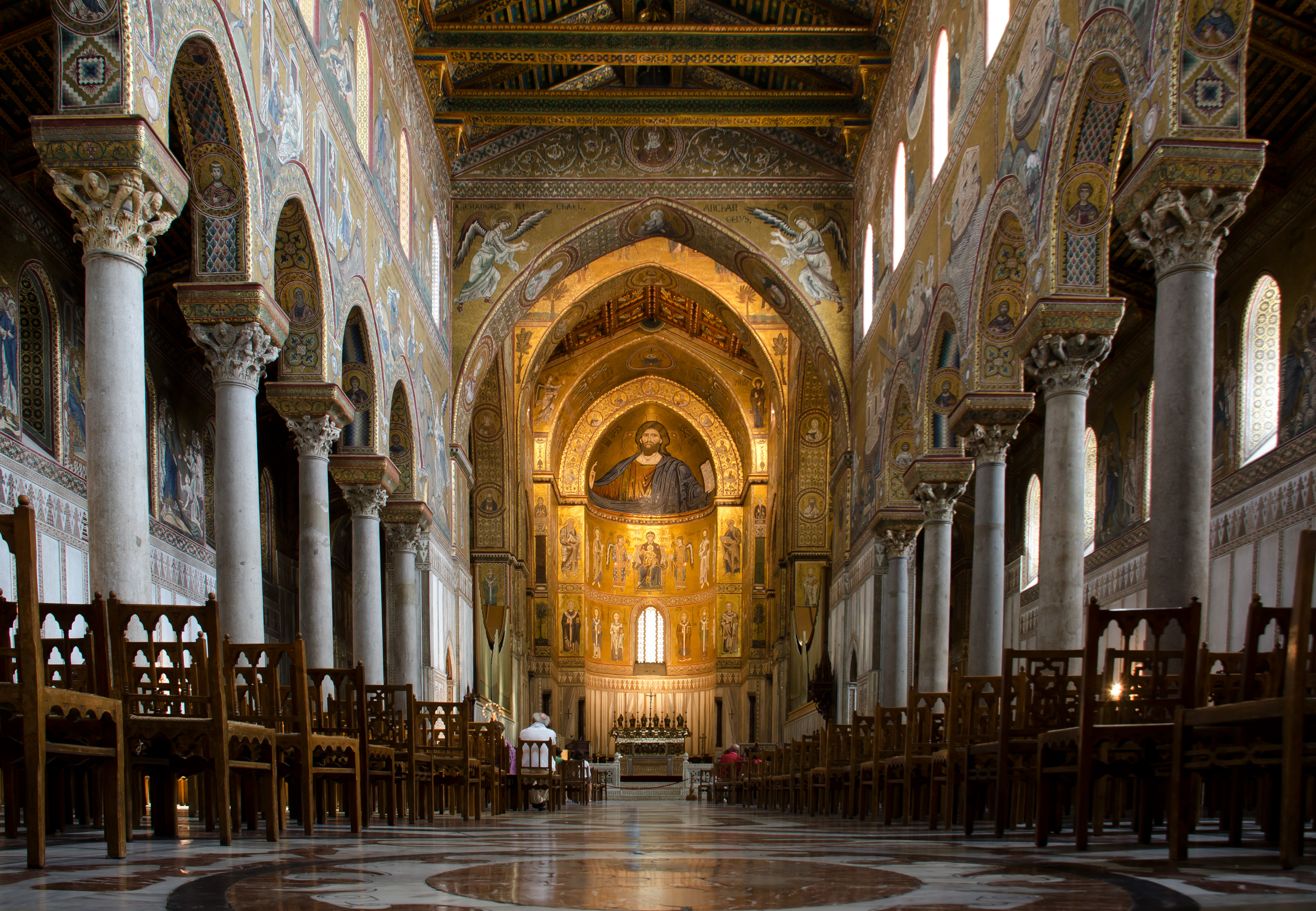
- Interior of Monreale Cathedral.

- Coat of arms

- Location within Italy Location within Sicily
- Coordinates: 38°04′54″N 13°17′20″E
- Country: Italy
- Region: Sicily
- Metropolitan city: Palermo (PA)
- Frazioni: Aquino, Borgo Fraccia, Borgo Schirò, Cicio di Monreale, Giacalone, Grisì, Monte Caputo, Pietra, Pioppo, Poggio San Francesco, San Martino delle Scale, Sirignano, Sparacia, Tagliavia, Villaciambra

Government
  - Mayor: Alberto Arcidiacono

Area
  - Total: 530.18 km^{2} (204.70 sq mi)
- Elevation: 310 m (1,020 ft)

Population (31 October 2017)
  - Total: 39,032
  - Density: 73.620/km^{2} (190.68/sq mi)
- Demonym: Monrealesi
- Time zone: UTC+1 (CET)
  - Summer (DST): UTC+2 (CEST)
- Postal code: 90046
- Dialing code: 091
- Patron saint: St. Castrensis
- Saint day: 11 February
- Website: https://www.comune.monreale.pa.it/

Monreale (/ˌmɒnriˈæl/ MON-ree-AL, Italian: [monreˈaːle]; Sicilian: Murriali; lit. 'Royal Mountain') is a town and comune (municipality) in the Metropolitan City of Palermo, Sicily, Southern Italy. It is located 310 meters (1017.06 ft) above sea level on the slope of Mount Caputo, a small promontory overlooking the valley of Palermo, from which it is approximately 7 km (4 miles) to the south.

The town developed on a site used by the Norman kings for hunting. Roger I of Sicily built a royal palace there, hence the name Mons Regalis. The city gained great importance when king William II of Sicily built Monreale Cathedral with the adjoining Benedictine monastery. In 1183, it became the seat of the archbishop.

Monreale forms its own archdiocese. Its cathedral is one of several buildings named in a UNESCO World Heritage Site, a group of nine inscribed as Arab-Norman Palermo and the Cathedral Churches of Cefalù and Monreale.

== History ==
After the occupation of Palermo by the Arabs (the Emirate of Sicily), the Bishop of Palermo was forced to move his seat outside the capital. The role of a cathedral was assigned to a modest little church, Aghia Kyriaki (Greek for 'Saint Dominica'), in a nearby village later known as Monreale. After the Norman conquest in 1072, Christians took back the former Palermo cathedral. Probably the village's role as a temporary ecclesiastical centre played a part in King William II's decision to build a cathedral here.

Monreale was a small village for a long time. When the Norman Kings of Sicily chose the area as their hunting resort, more people and commerce came to the area after the royalty built a palace (probably identifiable with the modern town hall).

Under King William II, a large monastery of Benedictines coming from Cava de' Tirreni, with its church, was founded and provided with large assets. The new construction also had an important defensive function. Monreale was the seat of the metropolitan archbishop of Sicily, which from then on exerted a significant influence over Sicily.

In the 19th century, underage marriages, or those performed without the blessing of the bride's parents, were known as "the marriages of Monreale", according to Eliza Lynn Linton. These referred to marriages performed in remote places, where the law was less observed. (see Gretna Green).

== Main sights ==
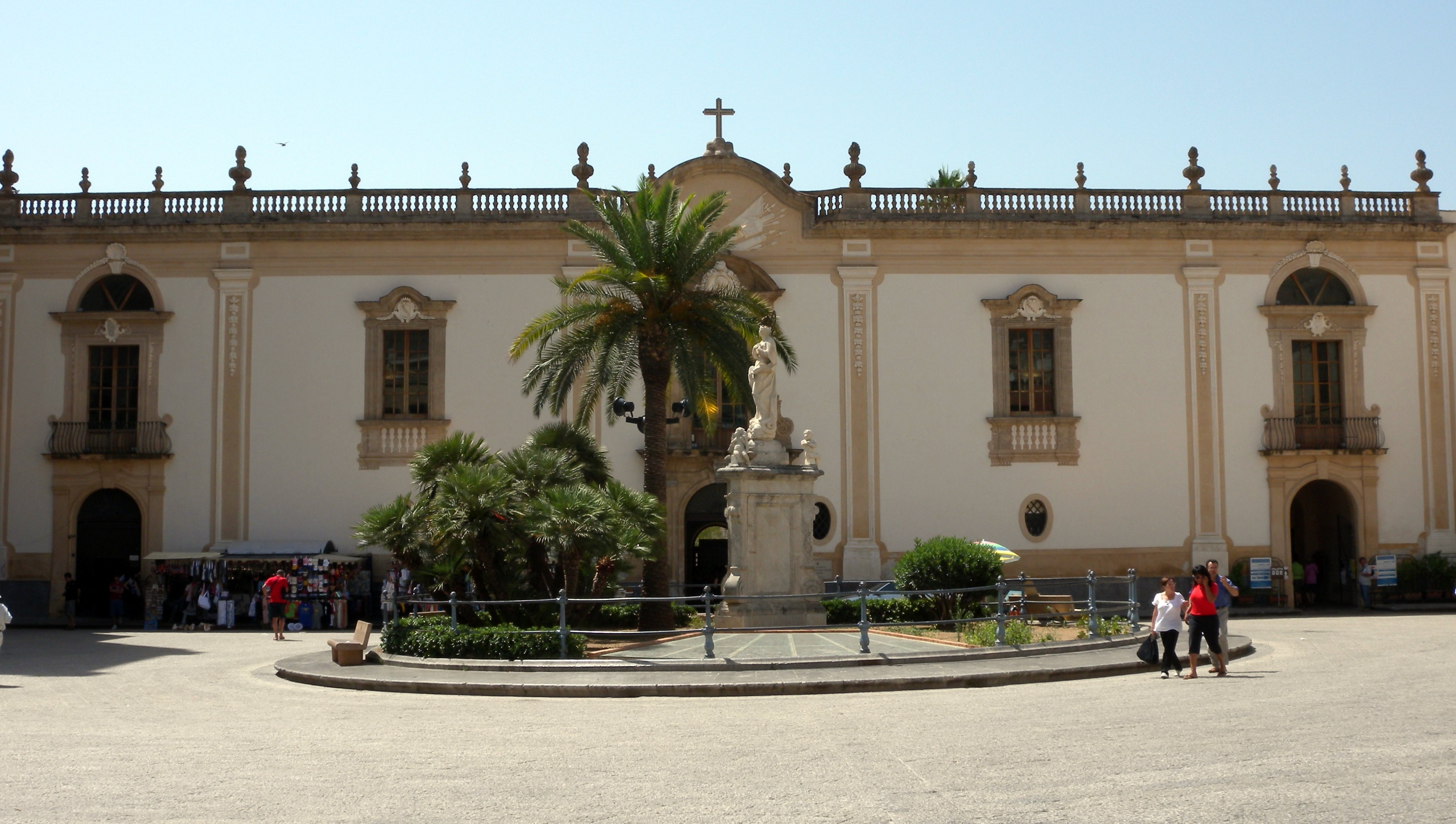
Benedictine Monastery.

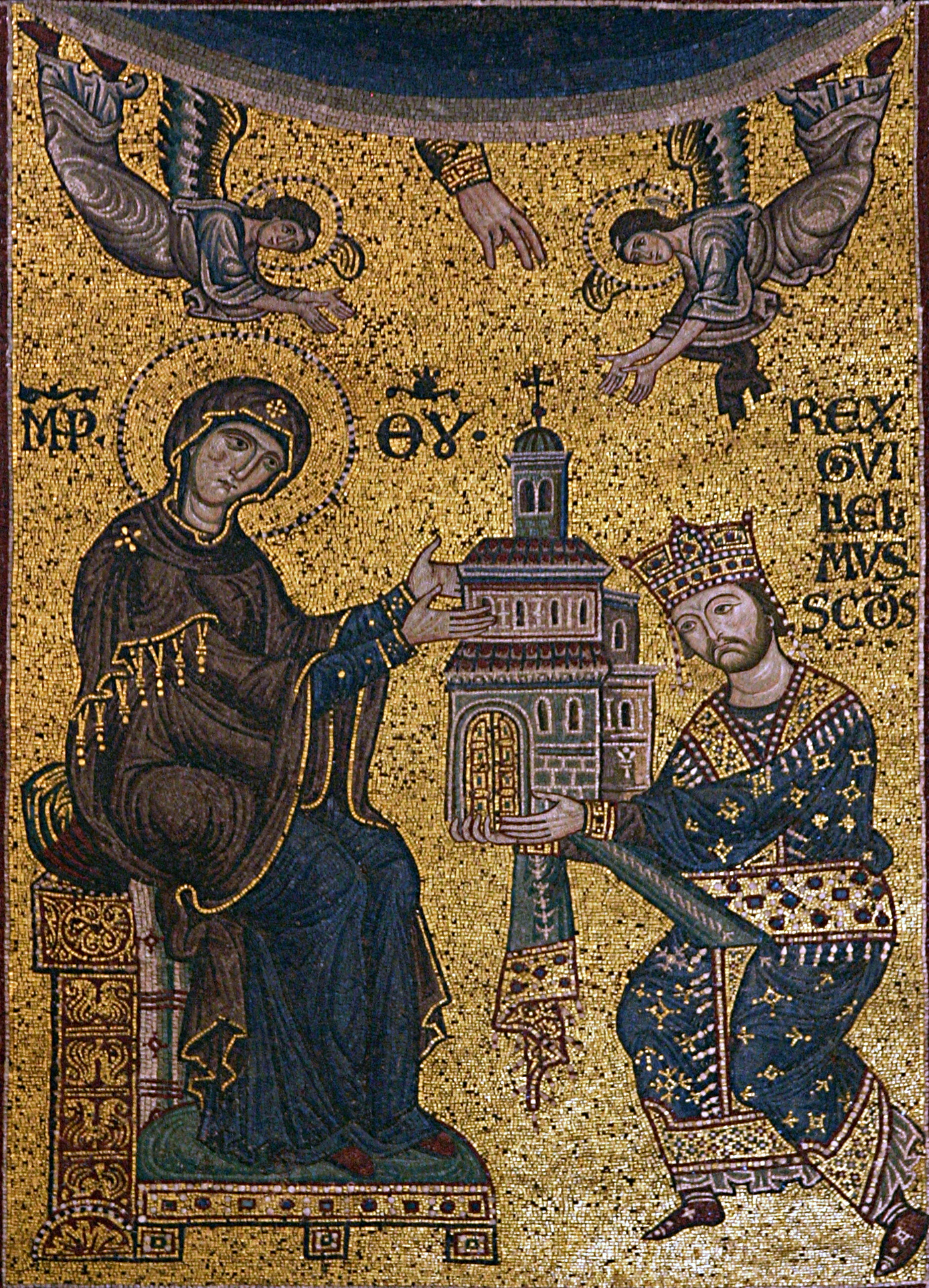
William II offering the Monreale Cathedral to the Virgin Mary, in the cathedral.

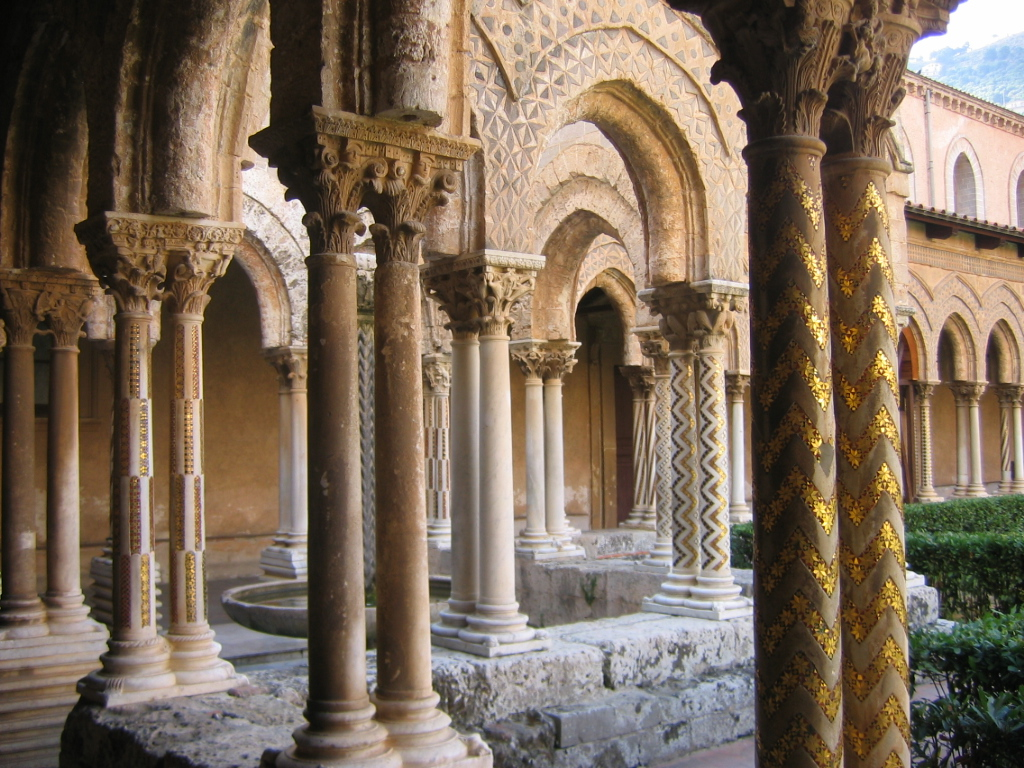
The cloister of the abbey of Monreale.

=== The Cathedral ===
Monreale Cathedral is one of the greatest extant examples of Norman architecture. It was begun in 1174 by William II and completed four years later. In 1182 the church, dedicated to the Nativity of the Virgin Mary, was, by a bull of Pope Lucius III, elevated to the rank of a metropolitan cathedral.

The church is a national monument of Italy and one of the most important attractions of Sicily. It is size is 102 metres (335 ft) long and 47 m (154 ft) wide. The façade is characterized by two large towers (one partially destroyed by lightning in 1807) and a portal with Romanesque bronze doors decorated by Bonanno Pisano. The interior is on the Latin cross plan, divided by ogival arcades, and features fresco cycles executed during the reigns of William II and Tancred of Sicily (c. 1194). The cloister has 228 small pairs of columns, each with different carved capitals influenced by Provençal, Burgundian, Arab and Salerno medieval art.

=== Other sights ===
- Castellaccio ("Bad Castle"), an example of a fortified convent on the Monte Caputo, at 764 m above sea level. It was built in the 12th century by King William II together with the Cathedral and the annexed monastery. It measures c. 80 x 30 m on an irregular plan with four towers on the western side, a middle tower and an entrance tower on the eastern side.
- The Abbey church of San Martino delle Scale, founded in the 6th century AD. It is on the Latin cross plan with a dome, a choir with paintings by Paolo De Matteis (1727), two small side apses, chapels in the transept and ten chapels in each of the aisles. The interior was decorated in 1602 with stuccoes. The baptismal font near the sacristy is from 1396.
- Church of Collegiata (16th-19th centuries)
- Church of Santa Ciriaca
- Church of San Silvestro

== International relations ==
Monreale is twinned with:

- Bielsko-Biała, Poland

== Notable people ==
- Samuele Segreto (born 2004), actor and dancer
- Rocky Segretta (1899–1953), American football player
- Panormo family including Vincenzo Trusiano, famous musical instrument makers, originated here

== See also ==
- Arab-Norman Palermo and the Cathedral Churches of Cefalù and Monreale
