= Monte delle Rose =

Mountain in Italy

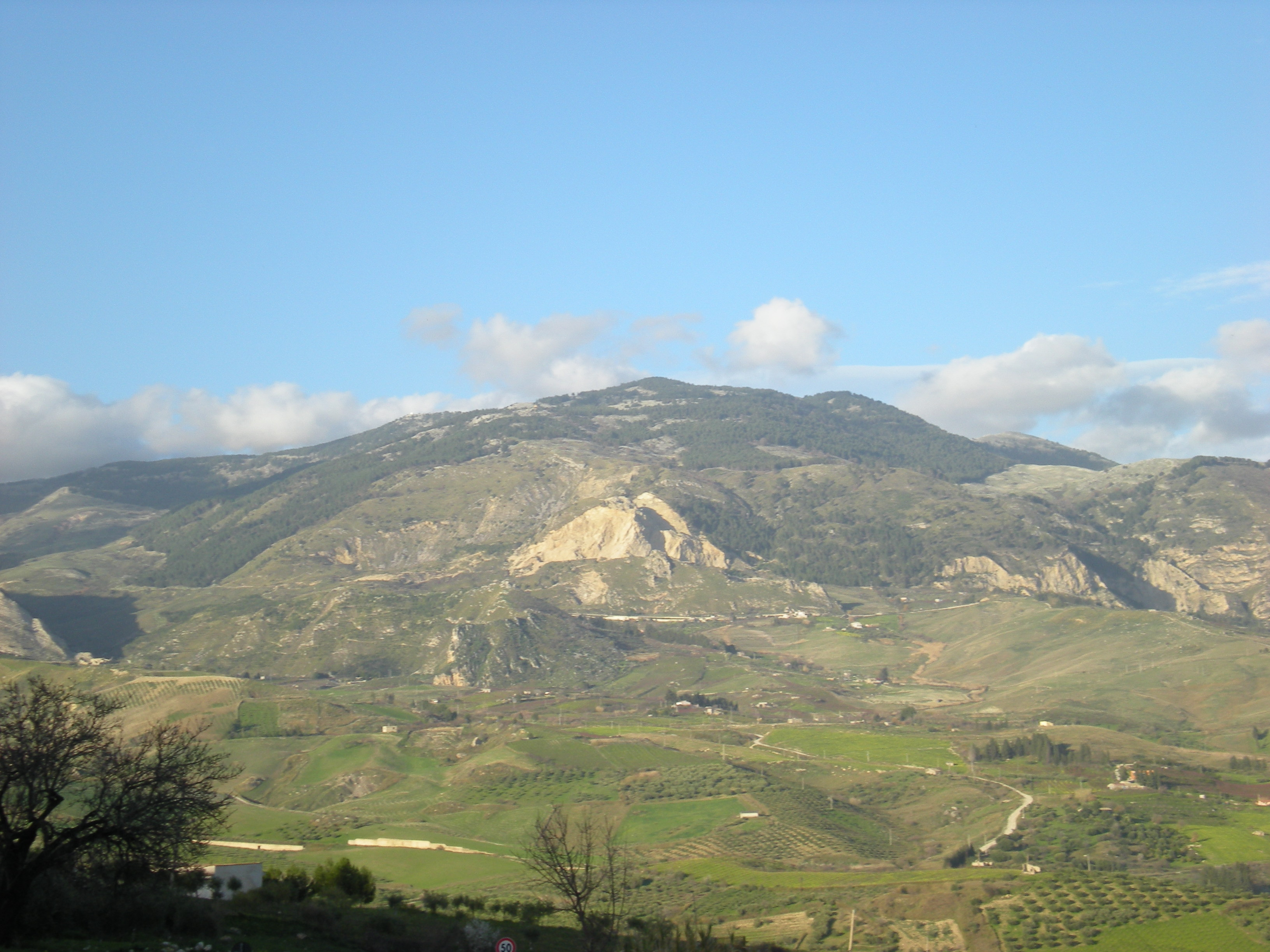
- Monte delle Rose from Bivona

Highest point
- Elevation: 1,426 m (4,678 ft)
- Coordinates: 37°39′N 12°25′E

Geography
- Location within Italy
- Location: Sicily, southern Italy
- Parent range: Monti Sicani

Monte delle Rose is a mountain in the Monti Sicani, in Sicily, southern Italy. It has an elevation of 1,426 metres (4,678 ft).

The most likely hypothesis is that the mountain's name derives from the flower, and more precisely from the thornless peony roses (Paeonia mascula), which bloom in February and grow mainly on this mountain. It is said that the roses grew there when Saint Rosalia, daughter of the noble Sinibaldo, lord of Quisquina and Monte delle Rose, passed by.

== Description ==
The Monte delle Rose is located at the boundary with Sosio Valley Natural Reserve. Historically, it was mentioned by Aristotle and Pliny the Elder and was famous for its herbs, studied by numerous botanists.

In addition to the aforementioned roses and peonies, the remaining flora of the Monte delle Rose district includes hyacinths, holly, lavender, primroses, butcher's broom, hawthorn, clematis, anemones, and various species of orchids. There are also numerous aromatic herbs, such as oregano, rue, dill, sage, cumin, hyssop, mallow, mint, lemon balm, thyme, and catmint.

The fauna is largely composed of migratory birds, such as the hoopoe, peregrine falcons, hares, porcupines, martens, and wild cats.

== Gallery ==
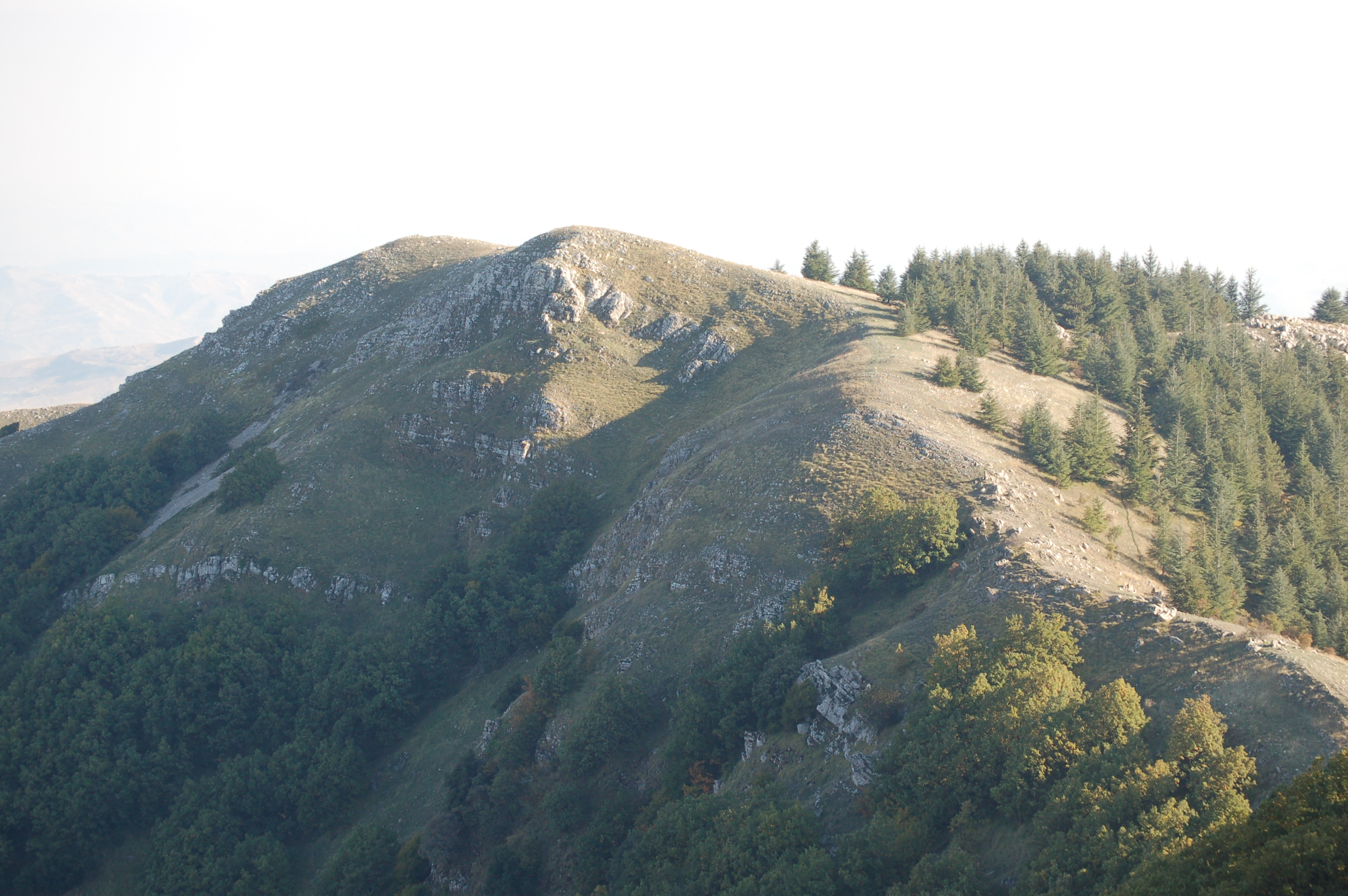

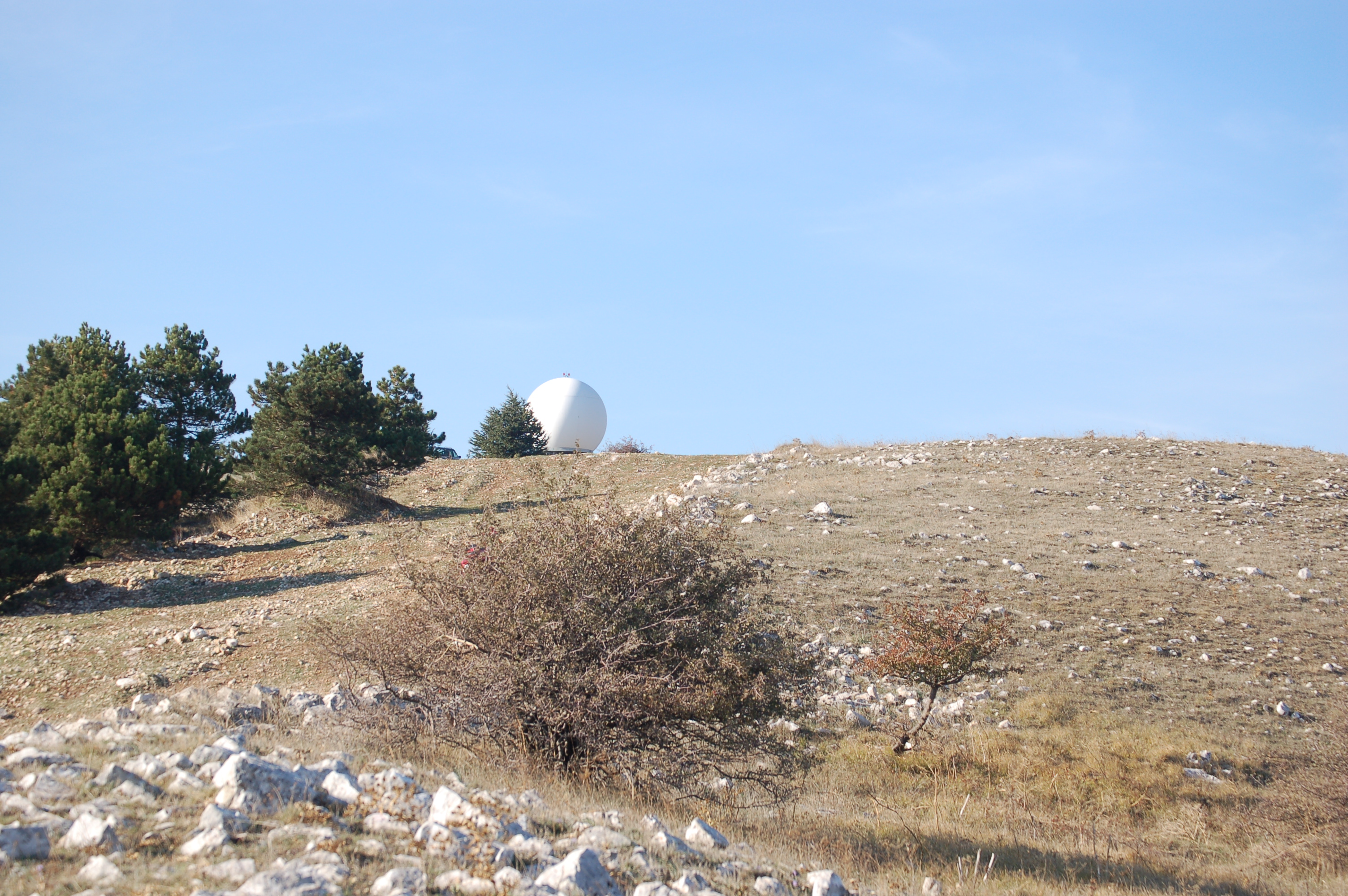

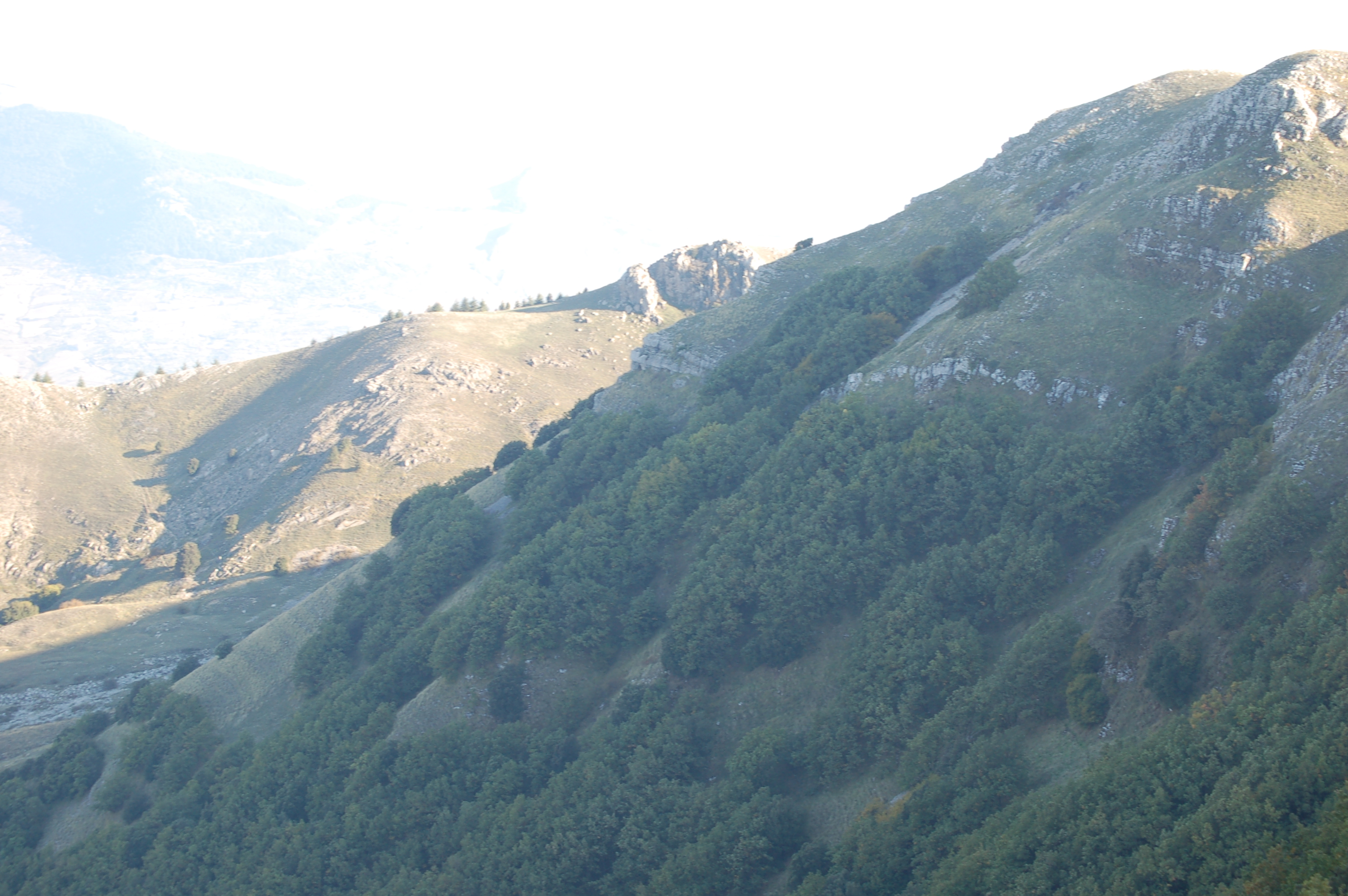

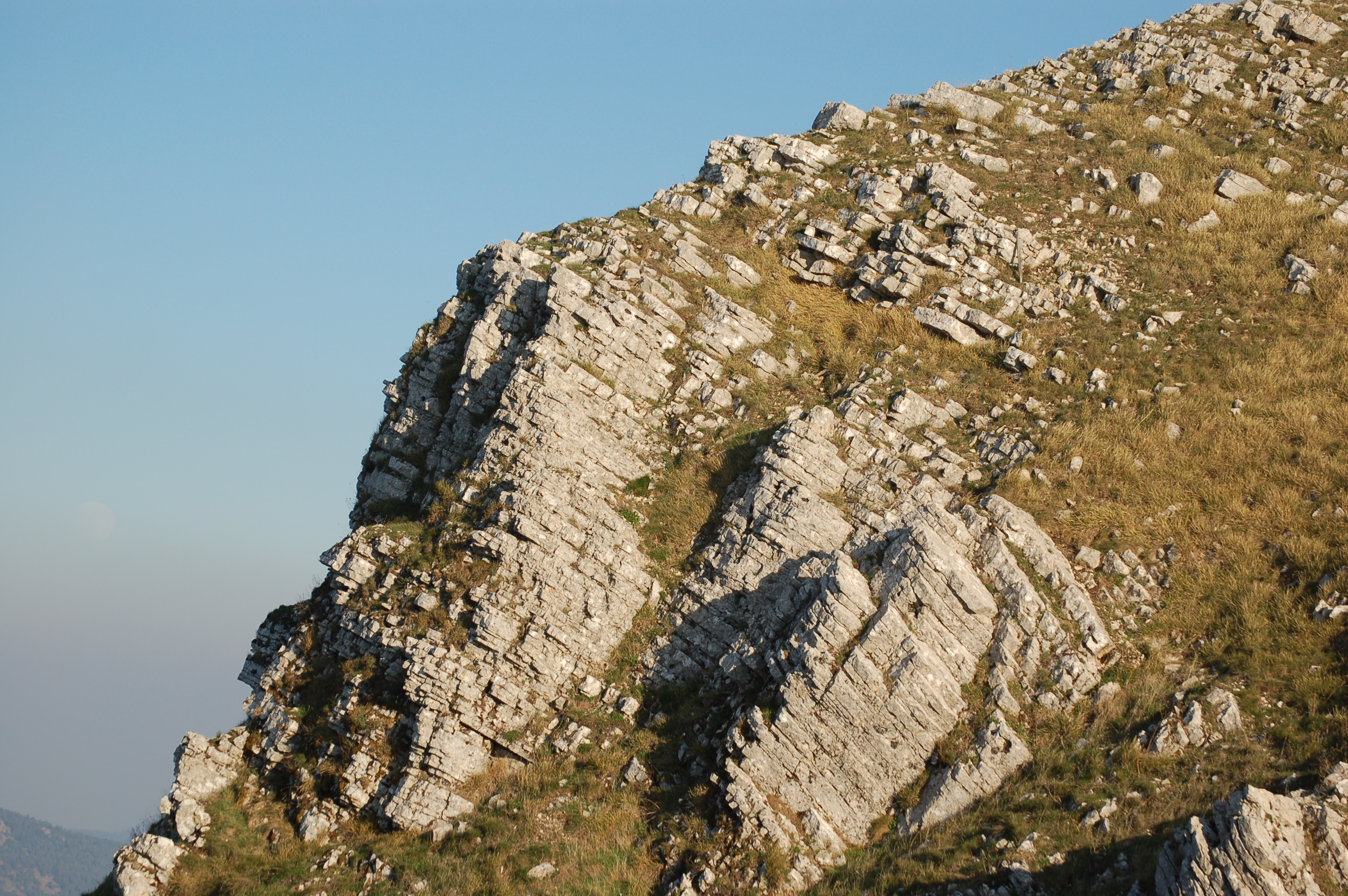
