= The Mafia Kills Only in Summer (film) =

- Italian: La mafia uccide solo d'estate
- Directed by: Pif
- Written by: Pif; Michele Astori; Marco Martani
- Produced by: Mario Gianani; Lorenzo Mieli; Fausto Brizzi
- Starring: Pif; Cristiana Capotondi
- Cinematography: Roberto Forza
- Music by: Santi Pulvirenti
- Release dates: 25 November 2013 (Torino); 28 November 2013 (Italy)
- Running time: 90 minutes
- Language: Italian

The Mafia Kills Only in Summer (Italian: La mafia uccide solo d'estate) is a 2013 Italian comedy-drama film. It marked the directorial debut of the TV satirist Pif. The Italian Senate President and former anti-mafia magistrate Pietro Grasso referred to this film as the best film work on Sicilian Mafia ever made.

The film premiered at the 2013 Torino Film Festival and released to theatres in Italy on 28 November 2013. It was awarded best comedy film at the 27th European Film Awards.

== Plot ==
The story takes place in Palermo and it follows the story of the young Arturo Giammarresi, who wishes to become a journalist and has loved Flora since he was ten years old. His awkward attempts to conquer her heart run parallel to his (and his city's) slow realisation of the existence of Cosa Nostra. In the end, the movie is mostly a homage paid to the policemen and the magistrates who fought and gave their lives between the late 1970s and 1992, heroes of legality that were martyred in the attempt to dismantle the Sicilian Mafia.

== Cast ==
- Pif as Arturo (adult)
- Cristiana Capotondi as Flora (adult)
- Claudio Gioè as Francesco
- Ninni Bruschetta as Fra Giacinto
- Alex Bisconti as Arturo (child)
- Ginevra Antona as Flora (child)
- Maurizio Marchetti as Jean Pierre
- Barbara Tabita as Arturo's mother

== See also ==
- List of Italian films of 2013
- The Mafia Kills Only in Summer (TV series)
