= Pif (television host) =

Italian television host, film director, actor and writer

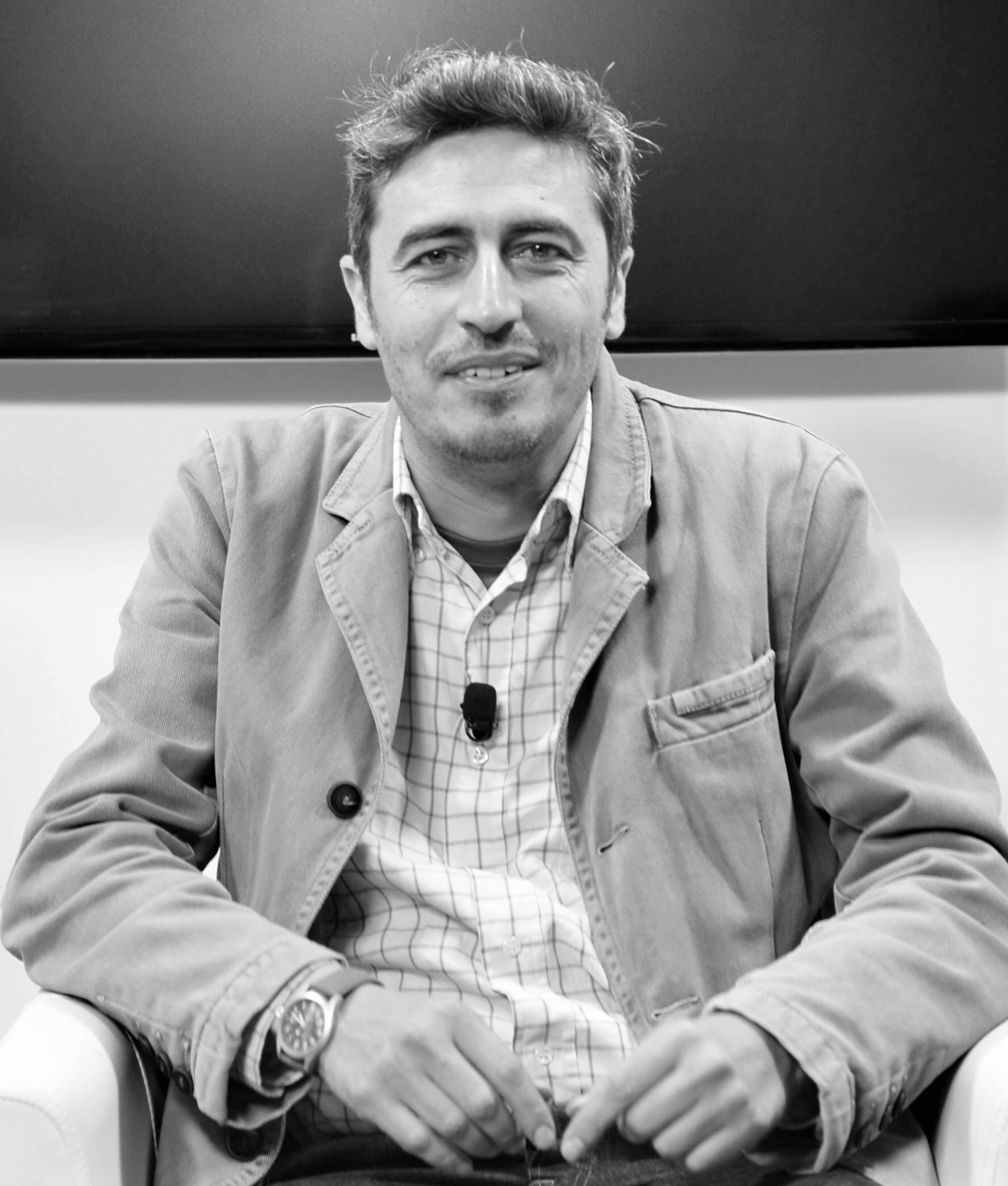
- Pif in 2014
- Born: Pierfrancesco Diliberto; 4 June 1972 (age 54); Palermo, Italy
- Occupations: Television presenter; screenwriter; film director; actor

Pierfrancesco Diliberto (born 1972), also known by the nickname Pif, is an Italian television host, film director, actor, and writer.

== Biography and career ==
Pif was born in Palermo, Italy on 4 June 1972. He is the son of the Italian director Maurizio Diliberto and has had a passion for cinema since his youth.

In 1998 he worked as assistant director to Marco Tullio Giordana for I cento passi (The Hundred Steps), a famous film against the mafia. In the same year he started working as a television author at Mediaset. In 2001 he started participating in Le Iene (The Hyenas), an Italian TV show with journalistic reporting characterized by a sharp satirical style.

In 2007 he started his own TV show, Il Testimone (The Witness), on MTV. In the show, he uses an Autovox to create amateur-like reports in Italy and abroad. In the same year he published his book Piffettopoli. Le fatiche di un quasi vip.

In 2012 he published the short story Sarà stata una fuga di gas (It Must Have Been a Gas Leak) in the book Dove eravamo. Vent'anni dopo Capaci e Via D'Amelio (Where We Were. Twenty Years After Capaci and Via D'Amelio), a miscellaneous volume commemorating the twentieth anniversary of the death of Giovanni Falcone and Paolo Borsellino, two famous Sicilian judges who fought against the mafia and, after being assassinated, became symbols of the fight against the mafia in Italy.

In 2013 he started his film career by writing and directing The Mafia Kills Only in the Summer, in which he also plays the leading role, and from which he created the homonym TV series, directed by Luca Ribuoli. In 2016 at the Rome Film Festival his second film as director: In guerra per amore.

== Filmography ==
=== As a director ===
Year	Title	Notes
2000	One Hundred Steps	Assistant director
2013	The Mafia Kills Only in Summer	Directional debut
2016	At War with Love	
2016	Roberto Saviano: Uno scrittore sotto scorta	Television documentary
2021	On Our Watch	

=== As a screenwriter ===
Year	Title	Notes
2007–present	Il testimone	Television program (creator, presenter and screenwriter)
2013	The Mafia Kills Only in Summer	Co-writer
2016	At War with Love	
2016–2018	The Mafia Kills Only in Summer	TV series (creator, narrator, and screenwriter)
2017	Caro Marziano	Docuseries
2021	On Our Watch	
2022	Caro Battiato	Television movie

=== As an actor ===
Year	Title	Role(s)	Notes
2012	Vai col liscio	Folk band player	Short film; uncredited cameo
2013	Pazze di me	Ludovico	
2013	Un posto al sole	Himself	Episode: "Il testimone"
2013	The Mafia Kills Only in Summer	Arturo Giammaresi	
2015	The Little Prince	The King (voice)	Italian voice-over role
2016	Untraditional	Himself	Episode: "I rigori nell'armadio"
2016	At War with Love	Arturo Giammaresi	
2016–2018	The Mafia Kills Only in Summer	Adult Salvatore / The Narrator	16 episodes
2019	Ordinary Happiness	Paolo	
2021	On Our Watch	Raffaello	

=== As himself ===
Year	Title	Role(s)	Notes
2000–2011	Le Iene	Himself / Reporter	Information program (seasons 4–14)
2007–present	Il testimone	Himself / Presenter	Docuseries
2014	MTV Italia Awards	Himself / Presenter	Annual ceremony
2014	Andrea Camilleri: Il maestro senza regole	Himself	Television documentary
2015	Ridendo e scherzando: Ritratto di un regista all'italiana	Himself	Documentary
2016	Le Iene	Himself / Presenter	Information program (season 19)
2017	Caro Marziano	Himself / Presenter	Docuseries
2018–2019	Danza con me	Himself / co-host	Dance event (seasons 1–2)
