= Rocca Busambra =

Mountain in Italy

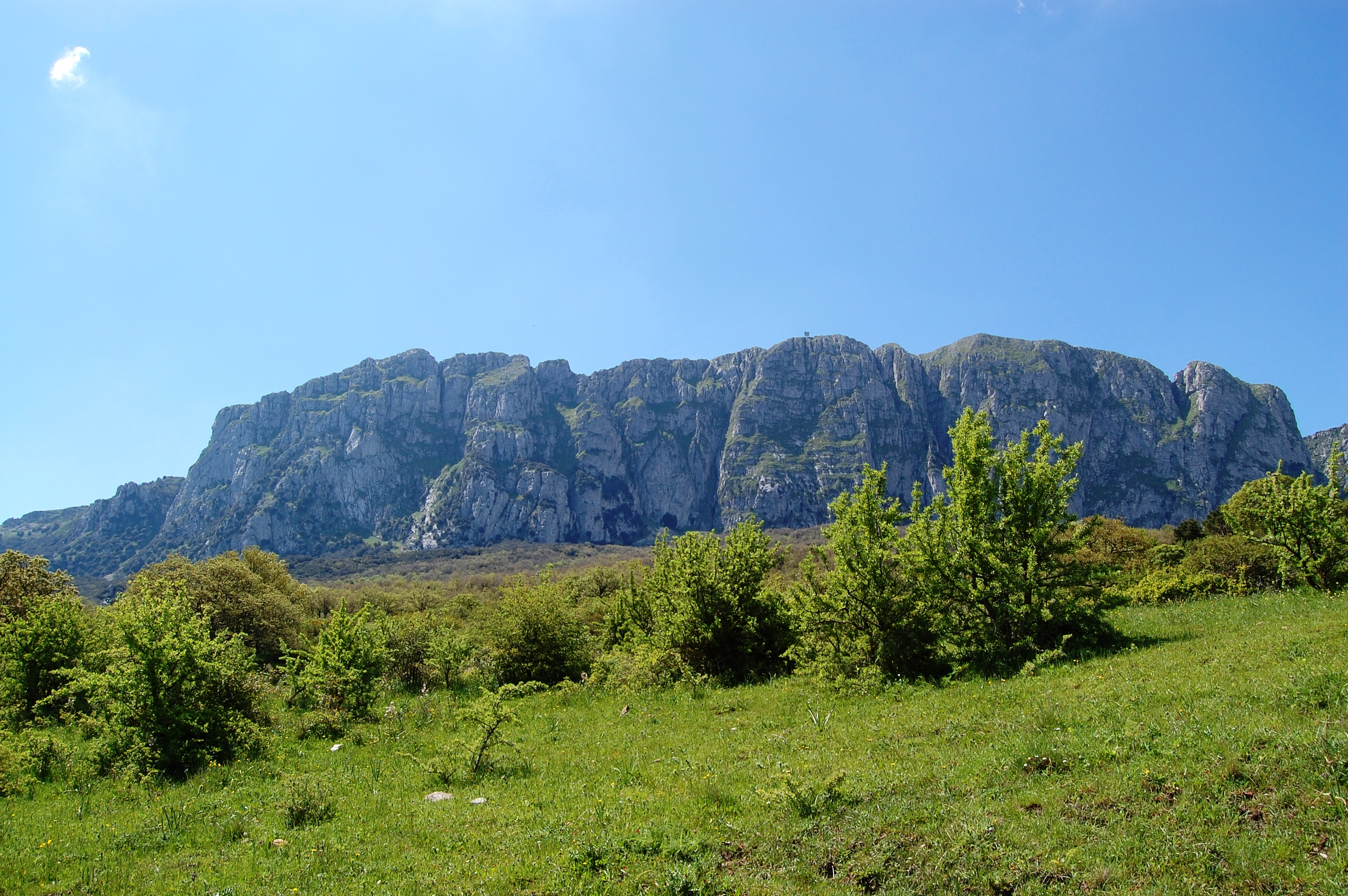

Highest point
- Elevation: 1,613 m (5,292 ft)
- Prominence: 1,049 m (3,442 ft)
- Listing: Ribu
- Coordinates: 37°51′20″N 13°23′50″E

Geography
- Location: Sicily, Italy
- Parent range: Monti Sicani

Rocca Busambra is the highest peak in the Monti Sicani, in western Sicily, southern Italy. It has an elevation of 1,613 metres (5,292 ft).

== Geography ==
The mount has the appearance of a flat, isolated ridge, with the Bosco della Ficuzza wood occupying its slopes. It is located between the territories of Godrano and Monreale, and above the village of Ficuzza, an enclave of Corleone. The territory is part of the Metropolitan City of Palermo.
