= Giordano (name) =

- Pronunciation: Italian: [dʒorˈdaːno]

Origin
- Origin: Hebrew, ירדן (Yarden), meaning "one who descends" or "to flow down"
- Meaning: Jordan River
- Region of origin: Italy

Other names
- Variant forms: Giordani, Giordan

Giordano is both a given name and a surname of Italian origin. It is the Italian version of Jordan.

== People with the surname Giordano ==
- Al Giordano, American journalist and political activist
- Alfonso Giordano (1843–1915), Italian doctor and mayor of Lercara Friddi
- Andrea Giordano (born 1976), Argentine gymnast
- Anthony Giordano, American crime boss
- Bruno Giordano, Italian footballer
- Bruno Giordano, Italian politician
- Charles Giordano, United States keyboards and accordion player
- Christian Giordano, Swiss anthropologist
- Dick Giordano (1932–2010), American comic book artist and editor
- Daniele Giordano, Italian footballer
- Fabio Giordano, Italian footballer
- Filippa Giordano, Italian crossover singer
- Gus Giordano, American jazz dancer, teacher, and choreographer
- Henry Giordano (1914–2003), American pharmacist and federal agent
- JoAnn Giordano, American textile artist and curator who has exhibited since 1977
- Juan Carlos Giordano, Argentine lawyer and politician
- Laura Giordano, Italian lyric soprano
- Lou Giordano, record producer and recording engineer
- Luca Giordano, 17th-century artist
- Mark Giordano, Canadian professional ice hockey defenceman
- Matías Giordano, Argentine footballer
- Matt Giordano, safety for the Indianapolis Colts of the NFL
- Matteo Giordano, Italian footballer
- Michele Giordano, Cardinal Archbishop emeritus of Naples, Italy
- Paolo Giordano, Italian writer
- Riccardo Giordano (born 1970), Italian windsurfer
- Silvia Giordano, Italian-Swiss computer scientist
- Tyrone Giordano (born 1976), deaf American actor
- Umberto Giordano (1867–1948), Italian composer
- William J. Giordano (1919–1993), New York politician

=== Geographical distribution of the surname ===
As of 2014, 60.3% of all known bearers of the surname Giordano were residents of Italy (frequency 1:759), 17.3% of the United States (1:15,615), 9.4% of Argentina (1:3,390), 4.3% of France (1:11,633) and 3.3% of Brazil (1:46,874).

In Italy, the frequency of the surname was higher than the national average (1:759) in the following regions:

1. Campania (1:242)
2. Basilicata (1:298)
3. Piedmont (1:325)
4. Calabria (1:428)
5. Liguria (1:456)
6. Sicily (1:494)

In Argentina, the frequency of the surname was higher than the national average (1:3,390) in the following provinces:

1. Córdoba Province (1:1,176)
2. Santa Fe Province (1:1,917)
3. San Luis Province (1:2,570)
4. Buenos Aires (1:2,696)
5. Mendoza Province (1:3,009)

== People with the given name Giordano ==
- Giordano Bruno, 16th-century philosopher
- Giordano Caini (born 1969), Italian footballer
- Giordano Corsi (1908–1958), Italian footballer
- Giordano Orsini (disambiguation), several people
- Giordano Vitale (1633–1711), mathematician

== See also ==
- Jordan (disambiguation)
- Jordanus (disambiguation)
- Jourdain
