= Giordani =

Giordani is an Italian surname. Notable people with the surname include:

- Alberto Giordani (1899–1927), Italian footballer
- Aldo Giordani (1914–1982), Italian cinematographer
- Attilio Giordani (1913–1972), Italian Roman Catholic and member of the Association of Salesian Cooperators
- Carmine Giordani (c. 1685–1758), Italian composer and organist
- Claudia Giordani (born 1955), Italian former alpine skier
- Domenico Giordani, O.F.M. Obs. (died 1640), Roman Catholic prelate, Bishop of Isernia
- Francesco Giordani (1896–1961), Italian research chemist and scientist
- Giuseppe Giordani (1751–1798), Italian composer of mainly operas
- Igino Giordani (1894–1980), Italian politician, writer and journalist
- Ivan Giordani (born 1973), Italian bobsleigher
- Leonardo Giordani (born 1977), former Italian cyclist
- Marcello Giordani (1963–2019), Italian operatic tenor
- Pietro Giordani (1774–1848), Italian writer, classical literary scholar
- Robert Giordani (1902–1981), French art director
- Silvia Giordani (born 1973), Italian chemist
- Tommaso Giordani (c. 1730-1733 – before 1806), Italian composer active in England and in Ireland
- Víctor Giordani (born 1951), Guate

== See also ==
Giordano (surname)
