= Lercara Friddi =

Lercara Friddi Arkara dî Friddi, Alcara de Freddi
- Comune
- Comune di Lercara Friddi
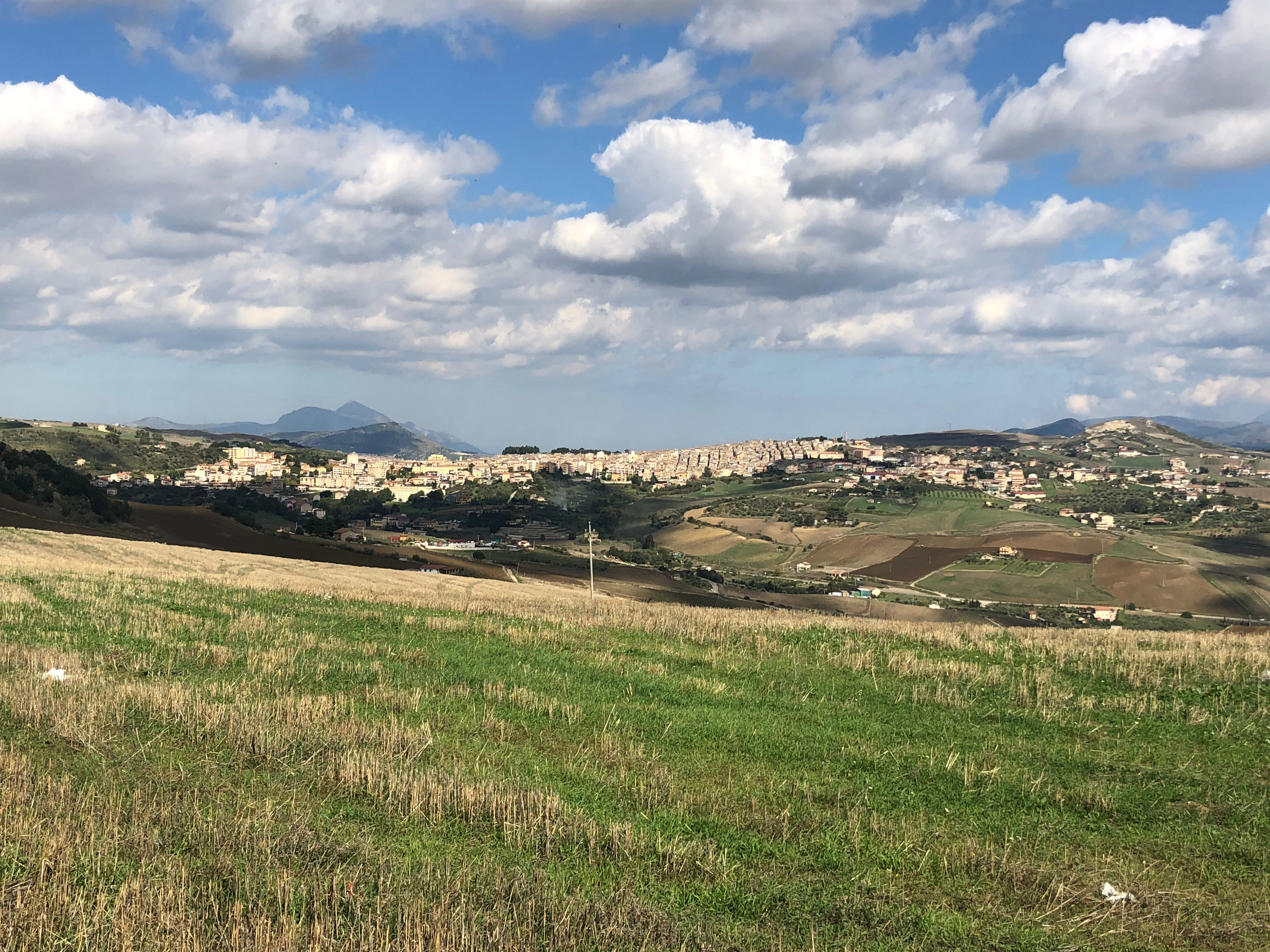
- View of the city

- Coat of arms

- Position of the municipality of Lercara Friddi within the Metropolitan City of Palermo

- Location within Italy Location within Sicily
- Coordinates: 37°45′N 13°36′E
- Country: Italy
- Region: Sicily
- Metropolitan city: Palermo (PA)
- Incorporated (town): September 22, 1595; 431 years ago
- Frazioni: Malpasso, Passo Putiaro, Santa Rosalia, Lercara Bassa, San Biagio, Contrada Canalotto

Government
  - Mayor: Luciano Marino

Area
  - Total: 37.49 km^{2} (14.47 sq mi)
- Elevation: 675 m (2,215 ft)

Population (30 June 2025)
  - Total: 6,047
  - Density: 161.3/km^{2} (417.8/sq mi)
- Demonym(s): Lercarese (singular), Lercaresi (plural)
- Time zone: UTC+1 (CET)
  - Summer (DST): UTC+2 (CEST)
- Postal code: 90025
- Dialing code: 091
- Patron saint: Holy Mary of Constantinople
- Saint day: 20 August
- Website: Official website

Lercara Friddi is a comune (municipality) in the Metropolitan City of Palermo, which is in the Italian region of Sicily, located about 45 kilometres (28 mi) southeast of Palermo.

== Geography ==
A map of Sicily, circa 11th century BC. The Colle Madore settlement is shown.

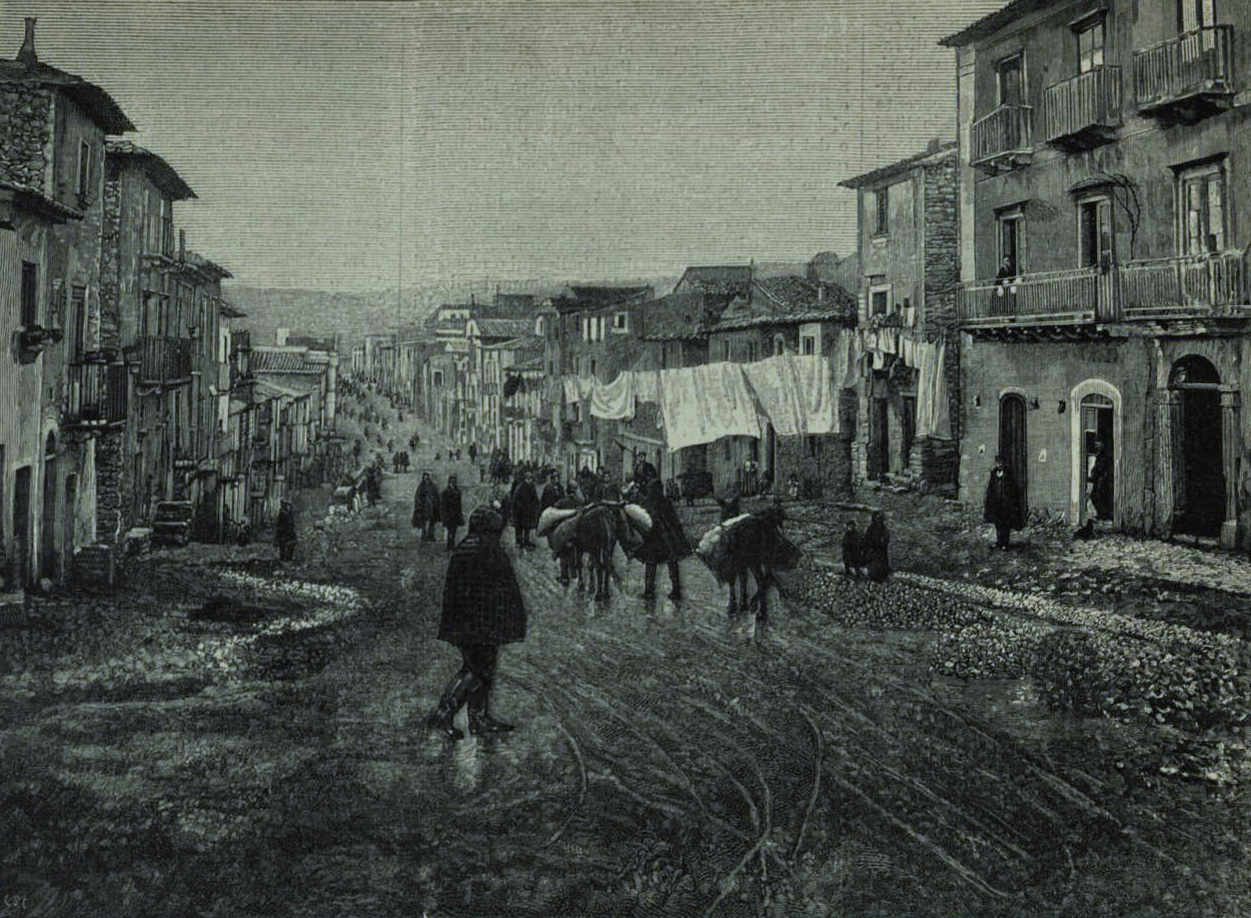
View of Lercara Friddi in 1894

Lercara Friddi rises almost at the foot of Colle Madore and its Sican archaeological site, between the Landro valley and the valley of Fiumetorto and Platani. Archaeological discoveries showed that this Colle and the valley have been inhabited since the 11th century BC, first inhabited by the Sican people. It is located on the Palermo – Agrigento route, at a height of 670 metres above sea level. Lercara Friddi was home to many sulfur mines. When they closed in the 1950s, many of the miners immigrated to Belgium, to work in the coal mines. It borders Castronovo di Sicilia, Prizzi, Roccapalumba, and Vicari.

== History ==
Lercara Friddi was founded in 1583, as part of the new cities established by the Spanish administration of King Philip II of Spain to repopulate the abandoned feudalities, and was granted a licentia populandi on September 22, 1595, though people had lived in the area continuously from circa 1400. It was granted to Baldassarre Gomez de Amezcua; who was married to Francesca Lercaro, daughter of Leonello and Elisabetta Ventimiglia, who had some marriage dowries in the feudary of Friddi, Friddigrandi, and Faverchi, dedicated to the production of wine and wheat. The descendants of Baldassarre Gomez de Amezcua and Francesca Lercaro were the Counts of Lercara Friddi until 1956.

Leonello Lercaro was a Genoese entrepreneur of Armenian origin, who came to Sicily in 1570 in search of better luck, and thanks to whose resourcefulness the original city nucleus was created. The family was Catholic, of Greek rite, and this can be seen in Lercara with the icon of the Madonna of Constantinople, found by the twelve-year-old Oliva Baccarella in 1807. The graffiti effigy, bearing the date of 1734, came presumably from a Lercarese church that followed the rite of the Lercari. The church was found outdoors, near a stream: the popular tradition passes on that event as miraculous, from which were the origins of the patronal feast and the church of Maria Santissima of Constantinople (which preserved the graffiti). The Festa of Maria Santissima di Costantinopoli, which is annually held in August, began in 1807.

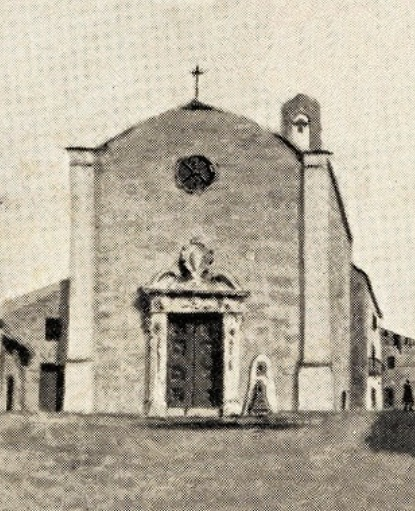
The Church of Our Lady of the Rosary, now demolished

For a long time, the major urban areas of Lercara Friddi were mainly places of worship: after the church of St. Gregory of Armenia, built by Leonello Lercaro between 1573 and 1580 in the area of Via dei Martiri, there was the church of Our Lady of the Rosary, built by Baldassarre Gomez de Amezcua between 1595 and 1604 on Pucci Street, the church of St. Anne, built by Francesca Lercaro between 1605 and 1610 on the same street of the same name, and the church of San Gregorio Traumaturgo, initially built by Raffaella Lercaro de Amezcua between 1627 and 1640 and then rebuilt several times until the early 19th century, corresponding to the upper part of Giulio Sartorio Street (all disappeared over time). By 1651, Lercara Friddi had a population of 281 residents.

The initial development of the settlement suffered from the dangerous conditions imposed on the settlers, but it found impetus in 1618 with the arrival of Francesco Scammacca Gravina, heir to the Lercaro barony, who in addition to residing in the nascent centre, favoured improvements such as new roads, beverage works and additional churches. In 1708, the barony of Lercara was elevated to the rank of principality.

In the book About Noble Sicily, written in 1754 by Francesco Maria Emanuele Gaetani, Lercara delli Friddi turns out to be "Baronial land with a mere and mixed empire [...] inhabited by 1536 souls, for which there are 483 houses [...] six Churches."

On 24 June 1800, Lercara Friddi was visited by the King of Sicily Ferdinand I, along with his wife, Queen Maria Carolina of Austria. They were hosted by Don Stefano Petta, Archpriest of Lercara, along with Don Marcello Sartorio.

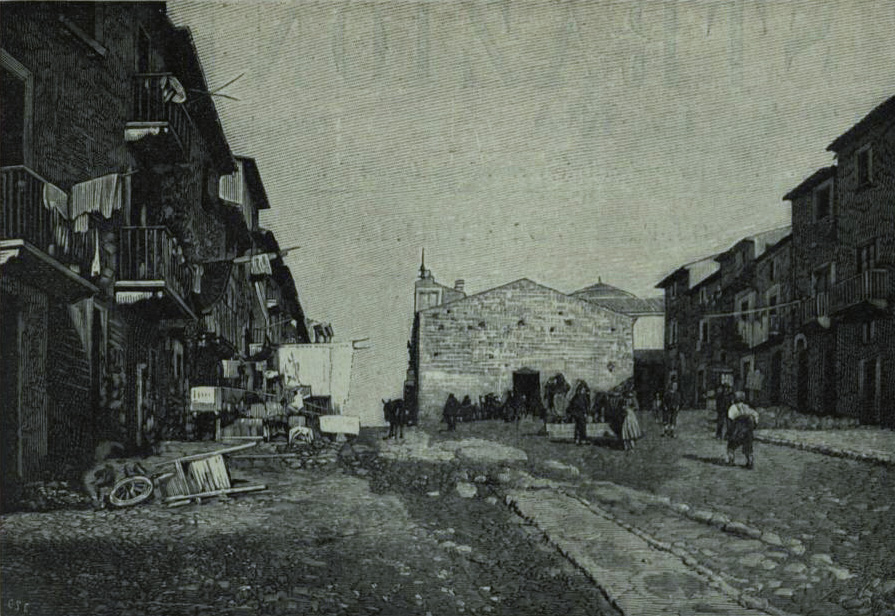
A street in Lercara, 1894

In 1801 the poet Giovanni Meli mentions Lercara Friddi (with the place-name of Alcara de freddi), in a passage of his reflection of the current state of the Kingdom of Sicily about agriculture and farmers: "...Those few, who remain in the villages, attached to their little families, finding themselves weak, and ill-fed, or falling into rhapsodization (terrible disease, first described by the cel. Linnaeus) which between weakness, and contraction takes away the use of their knees, and legs or they do not have the strength to withstand the aerial vicissitudes of autumn, or the rigors of winter, hence the frequent epidemics, which depopulate the villages, and the countryside; as we have seen in this year that in Alcara alone of the colds between the space of a few months one thousand were missing, half dead and half fled for misery, and debts. And oh the great loss, which is this to the state! [...]"

In 1781, the position of Mayor of Lercara Friddi was established, with Martino Ciancio serving as the first Mayor. That same year, the positions of 'Magnifico Giurato' and 'Tesoriere' (treasurer) were also established; both were abolished in 1811.With the Sicilian Constitution of 1812 and the repeal of the feudality, Lercara Friddi was also given the title of "Free University." In 1820, the position of Decurione (Municipal Administrator) was established.

It was the discovery of sulfur that changed the fortunes of the town, making it an important mining centre, the only one in the province of Palermo, for the extraction and processing of Sicilian sulfur, spurring its growth from 1828. The development led to an unprecedented population increase.

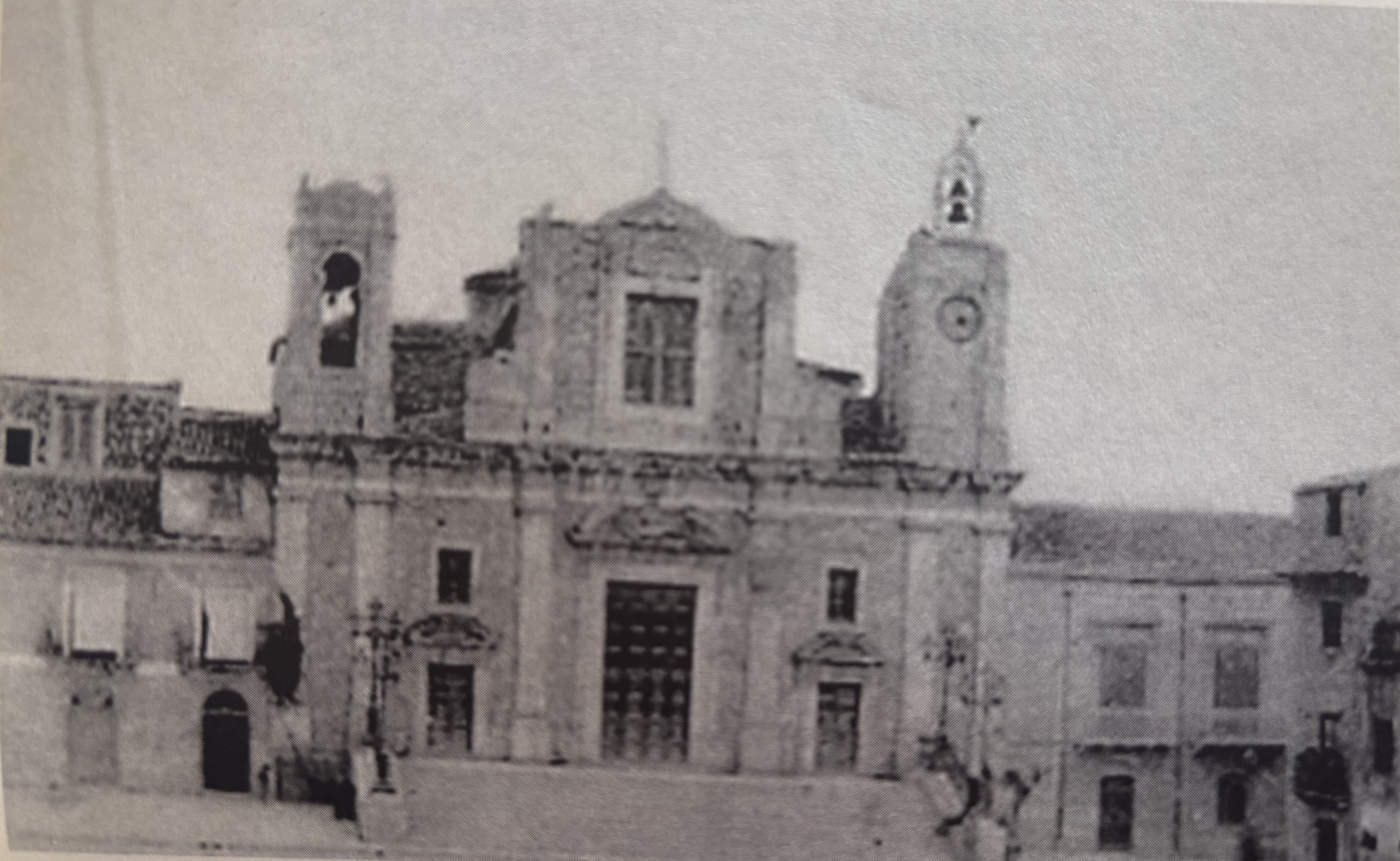
The cathedral before its major reconstruction, c. 1910

In 1896, the Lercara Friddi Cemetery was moved from the main town square to the outskirts of the city. Families who had relatives buried in the old cemetery had the opportunity to move their relatives to the new cemetery, but at the family's cost. Only a few families paid. The families that didn't pay had their relatives moved for free, but they had no tombstone, only a small stone marker.

However, after the Unity of Italy, the conditions of much of the population of the Mezzogiorno (and Sicily in particular) still remained largely unsatisfactory. The Southern question saw the upsurge of brigandage, which in 1863 and 1876 also involved two members of the Rose-Gardners, who were kidnapped and freed upon payment of a ransom. In 1893, the year of the beginning of the crisis in the sulfur industry, several Lercarean miners complained of serious wage delays. And during the Sicilian Fasci, Lercara paid a toll of eleven victims in the Christmas Day protest.

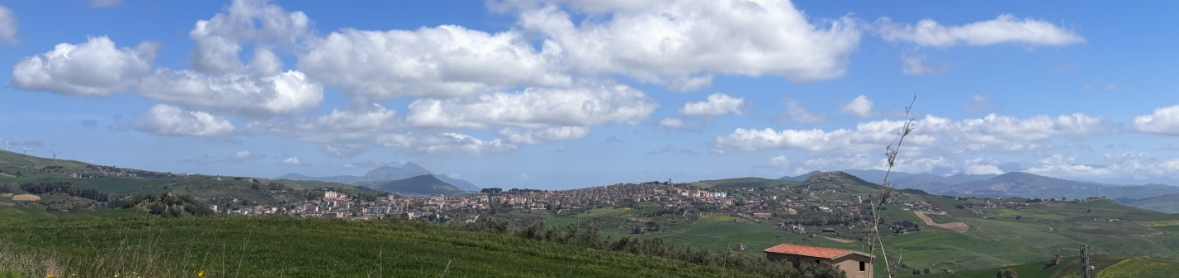
View of Lercara Friddi

The slow decline of the sulfur economy was also associated with dramatic labor conditions, particularly child and female labor, denounced by Alfonso Giordano and Jessie White-Mario. Over half a century later, they were echoed by Carlo Levi in 1951 and the journalist and poet Mario Farinella. In 1956, the title of Count of Lercara Friddi was abolished, following the death of the last count, Giuseppe Turrisi–Grifeo.

== Historical sites and monuments ==
=== Religious sites ===
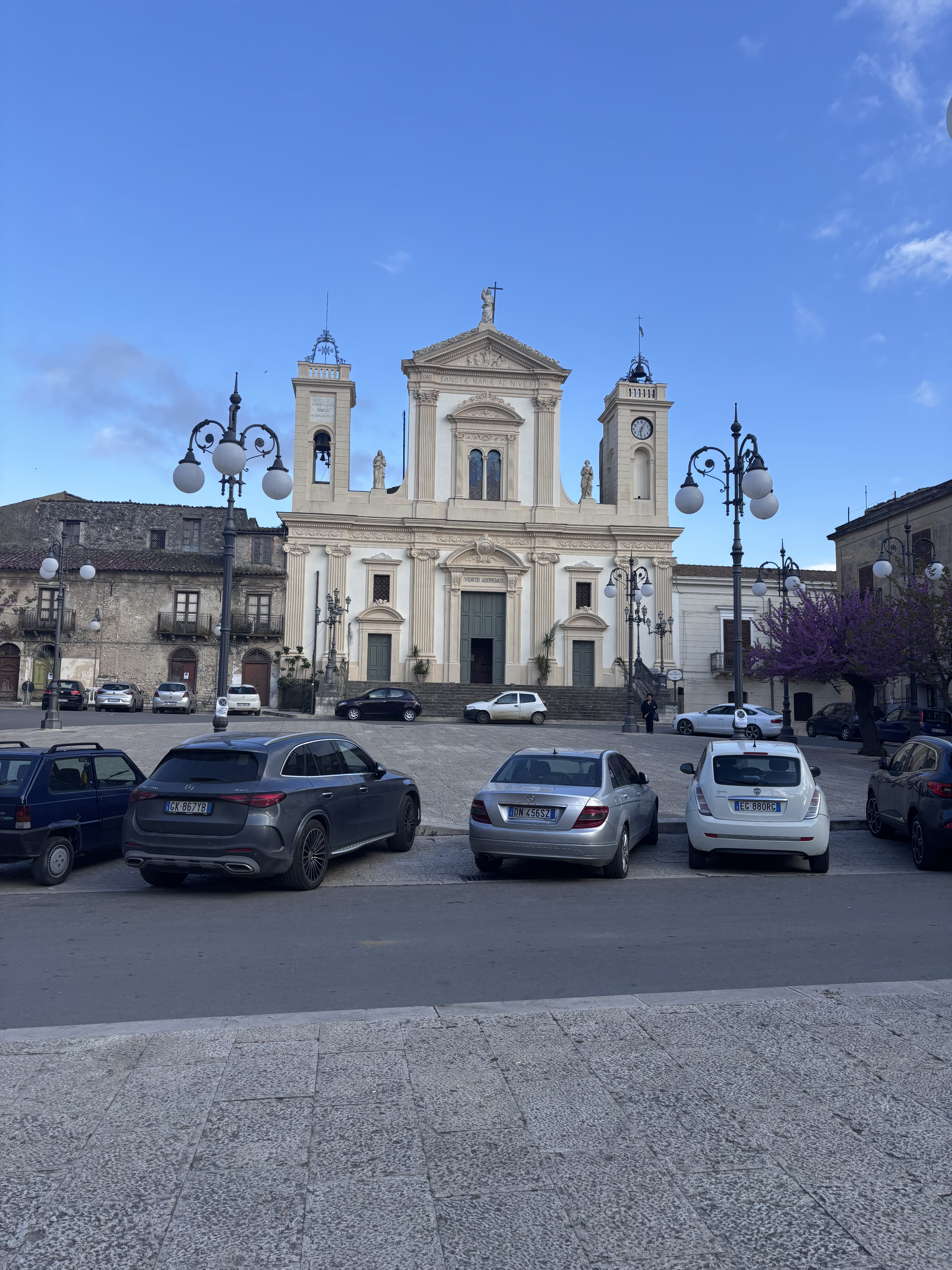
Church of Maria Santissima della Neve in 2025, after the renovations

- Church of Maria Santissima della Neve [Saint Mary of the Snows] (1702–1721), Renaissance style
- Church of San Matteo [Saint Matthew] (built 1686), Baroque style
- Church of San Antonio di Padova [Saint Anthony of Padua] (built 1688), Neo-Gothic style
- Church of San Giuseppe [Saint Joseph], built in 1756 by the Princess Raffaella Scammacca Buglio with a Neo-Gothic facade and Baroque interior
- Church of Saint Rosalia (18th century)
- Church of Maria Santissima dell'Aiuto [Saint Mary of Help] (1749)
- Church of Saint Francis of Saverio (1800)
- Church of Maria Santissima di Costantinopoli [Saint Mary of Constantinople] (built 1840)
- Parish church of Saint Alfonso Maria of Liguria (building started in 1854–1858, and was stopped in 1860 and restarted in 1924; finished in 1932, expanded in 1960)
- Chapel of the Institute of the Capuchin Nuns (20th Century)
- Altar of the Holy Cross (1814)

=== Civil buildings ===
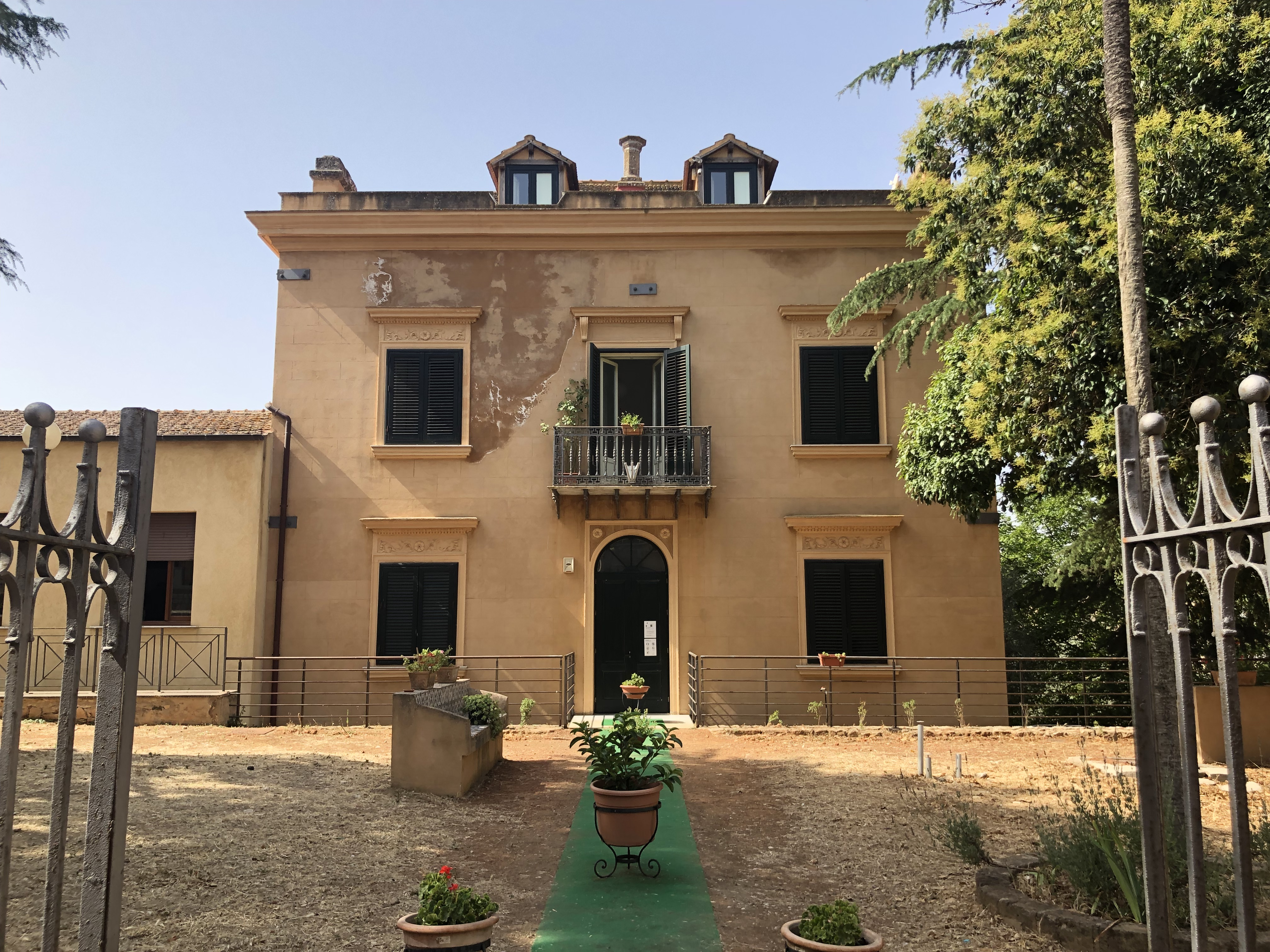
Villa Rose-Gardner

On Croce Hill, abutting the built-up area, there is valuable 19th-century structure: the Holy Cross and the water reservoir that fed the public fountains (the basin). Deserving attention are the elevations of the Sartorio Plexus and the array because of the semiotic clash between the Catholic Church and local Freemasonry in the late 19th-early 20th century period.

Lercara is also home to the War Memorial, built in 1922 by sculptor Cosmo Sorgi, and several public monuments that, among others, celebrate the memory of distinguished local personalities (some are the work of fine artists of the past such as Mario Rutelli, Antonio Ugo and Domenico De Lisi).

Notable civil or historical buildings are:

- Casa di Calcedonio Catalano [House of Calcedonio Catalano] (17th/18th century)
- Palazzo Miceli [Miceli Palace] (17th century)
- Palazzo Scammacca [Scammacca Palace] (17th century)
- Palazzo Sartorio [Sartorio Palace] (built 1747)
- Palazzo Romano [Romano Palace] (built 1870)
- Palazzo Rotolo [Rotolo Palace] (built 1877), Baroque style
- Casa Favarò [Favarò house] (19th century)
- Palazzo Favarò [Favarò palace] (19th century)
- Palazzo Riso-Ferraro [Riso-Ferrara Palace] (19th century)
- Palazzo Palagonia [Palagonia Palace] (built 1922)
- Villa Lisetta (1840)
- Villa Rose-Gardner (1840)

=== Archeological sites ===
Ruins dating back to the 8th and 6th centuries BC can be found in the archaeological area of Colle Madore.

The archaeological finds started in 1992 when Lercarese Antonino Caruso handed over to the municipality a group of valuable finds, recovered accidentally, from Colle Madore. On this high ground near the town was "the temple of Aphrodite/tomb of Minos," according to the thesis of Danilo Caruso, A scholar who also attributed anonymous canvases, kept at the Cathedral and in San Matteo, to Zoppo di Gangi (stage name of two Sicilian artists of the late 16th-early 17th-century) and the 19th-century painter Giuseppe Carta.

== Coat of arms ==
Coat of arms

The coat of arms of the municipality is blazoned with four bands of red and three bands of gold; the shield is timbered by a prince's crown.

== Culture ==
The Municipal Library "Giuseppe Mavaro" (Lercarese teacher and scholar of literature and municipal history) houses "Costume in the Pup," by Vito Giangrasso, and the archaeological museum. The Lercarese 'cassa rurale' was founded by Giusto Favarò and Archpriest Giuseppe Marino.

== Demographic Evolution ==
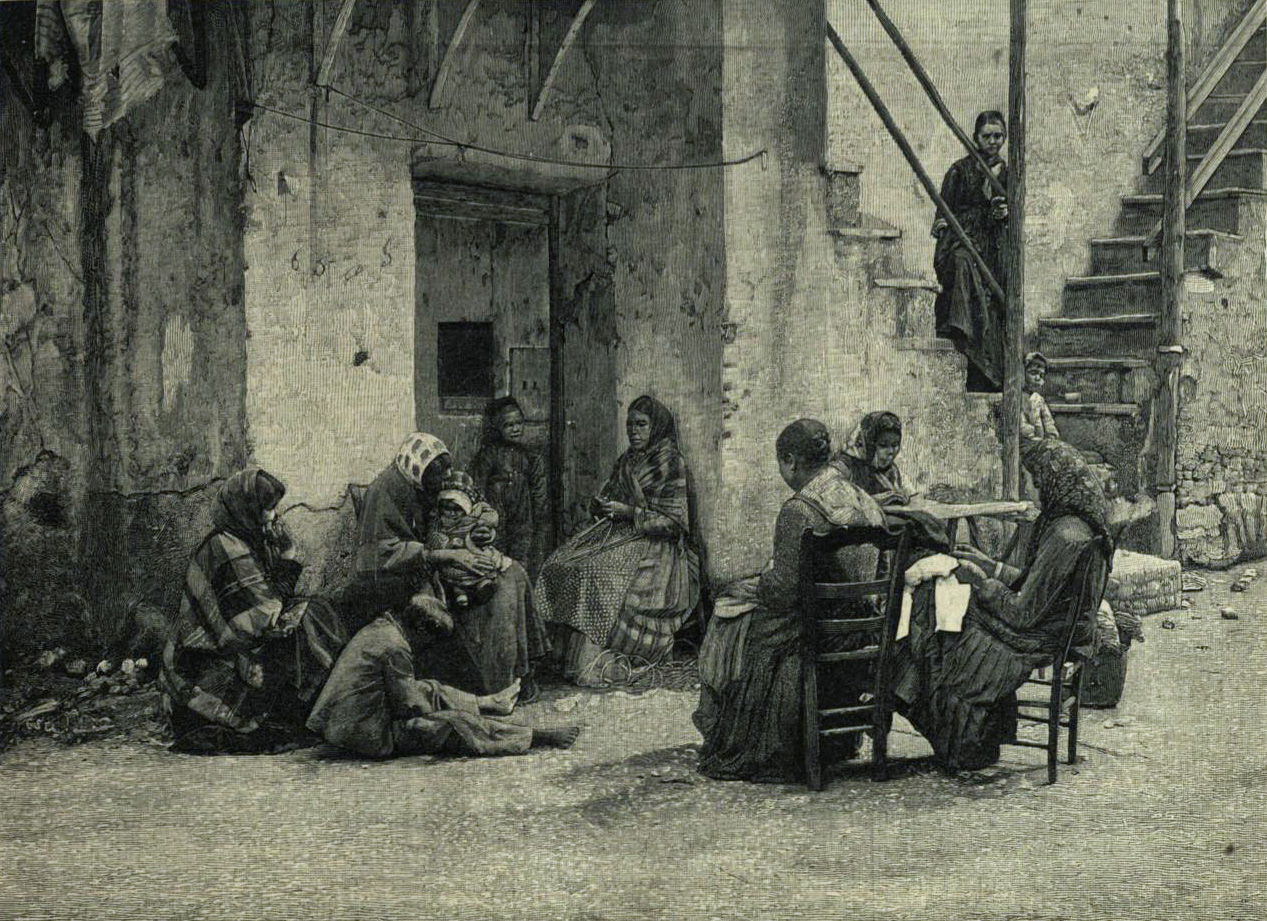
A group of Lercarese women, c. 1890

The population of Lercara Friddi from 1651 to 2025.

Historical population

Year	Pop.	±%
1651	281	—
1653	279	−0.7%
1714	1,536	+450.5%
1748	1,862	+21.2%
1798	5,396	+189.8%
1831	6,035	+11.8%
1852	7,463	+23.7%
1861	9,023	+20.9%

Year	Pop.	±%
1871	9,154	+1.5%
1881	13,205	+44.3%
1901	13,562	+2.7%
1911	11,262	−17.0%
1921	10,876	−3.4%
1931	11,137	+2.4%
1936	12,255	+10.0%
1951	13,512	+10.3%

Year	Pop.	±%
1961	11,872	−12.1%
1971	9,536	−19.7%
1981	9,749	+2.2%
1991	7,602	−22.0%
2001	7,392	−2.8%
2011	6,935	−6.2%
2021	6,329	−8.7%
2025	6,047	−4.5%

Source: Data from ISTAT and from 'Lercara Città Nuova' by Giuseppe Mavaro

== Counts of Lercara Friddi ==
Between 1595 and 1956 the territory of Lercara Friddi was ruled by the descendants of Leonello Lercaro, founder of the town. The title passed through the Grifeo and Turrisi–Grifeo families, before being abolished in 1956 following the death of Giuseppe Turrisi–Grifeo. Below is a chronological list of Counts of Lercara Friddi:

=== 16th Century ===
- Lionello Lercaro (1595–1596)
- Francesca Lercaro (1596–1611)

=== 17th Century ===
- Raffaella de Amezcua (1611–1666)
- Matteo Scammacca (1666–1708)

=== 18th Century ===
- Giuseppe Blasco Scammacca (1708–1716)
- Raffaella Scammacca (1716–1739)
- Mario Buglio (1739–1744)
- Raffaella Buglio (1744–1770)
- Maria Gioacchina Gaetani (1770–1803)

=== 19th Century ===
- Maria Provvidenza Gravina (1803–1805)
- Agata Gravina (1805–1846)
- Benedetto Grifeo (1846–1853)
- Vincenzo Grifeo (1853–1879)
- Stefania Grifeo (1879–1905)

=== 20th Century ===
- Mauro Turrisi-Grifeo (1905–1917)
- Giuseppe Turrisi-Grifeo (1917–1956)

== Mayors of Lercara Friddi ==
The position of Mayor of Lercara Friddi was created in 1780 by the Countess of Lercara Friddi, and the first officeholder was Martino Ciancio, who served as Mayor between 1781 and 1782. Below is a list of Mayors of Lercara Friddi from 1980 onwards:

- Mayor Giuseppe Pasquale Ferrara (1980–1988)
- Mayor Salvatore Cangialosi (21 November 1988 – 4 June 1990), Christian Democracy.
- Mayor Rosario Lo Bue (17 November 1990 – 8 May 1991), Christian Democracy.
- Francesco Gioacchino Giacovelli (23 July 1991 – 28 July 1991).
- Mayor Biagio Antonio Favarò (1 August 1991 – 14 November 1991), Christian Democracy.
- Mayor Michelangelo Castronovo (14 November 1991 – 14 May 1993), Italian Socialist Party.
- Commissioner Giovanbattista Leone (14 May 1993 – 23 November 1993).
- Mayor Biagio Antonio Favarò (23 November 1993 – 11 December 1997).
- Commissioner Pietro Tramuto (11 December 1997 – 25 May 1998).
- Mayor Giuseppe Pasquale Ferrara (25 May 1998 – 27 May 2003).
- Mayor Gaetano Licata (27 May 2003 – 11 June 2013).
- Mayor Giuseppe Pasquale Ferrara (11 June 2013 – 10 June 2018).
- Mayor Luciano Marino (10 June 2018 – present).

== Archpriests ==
Below is a list of the Archpriests of Lercara Friddi. The church of Lercara Friddi was consecrated in 1646, and the position of Archpriest was granted in 1664 by Archbishop of Palermo, Pietro Jerónimo Martínez y Rubio. Between 1646 and 1664, Lercara Friddi had a Vicario Curato called Giuseppe Puntacuda.

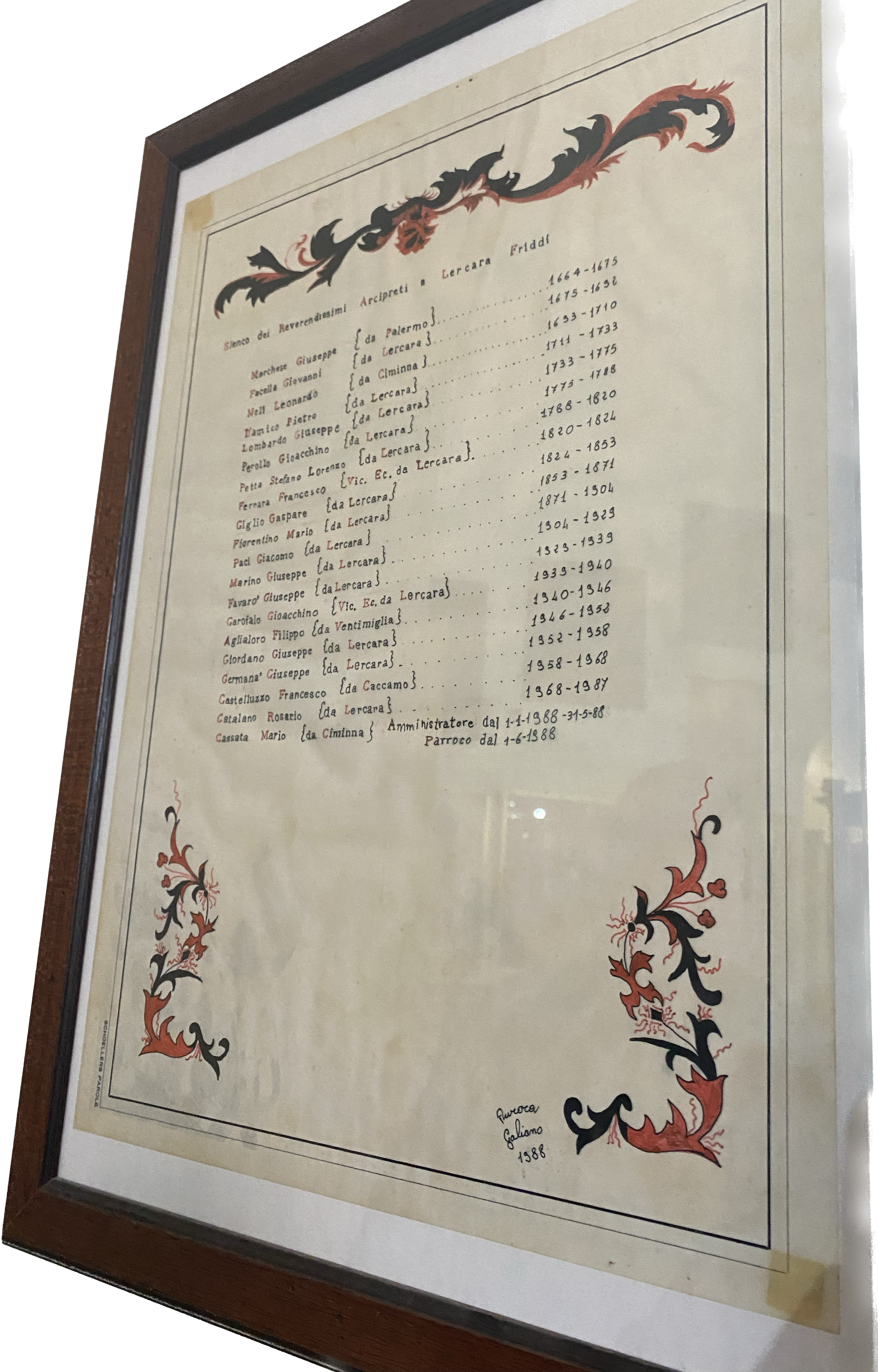
List of Archpriests of Lercara Friddi

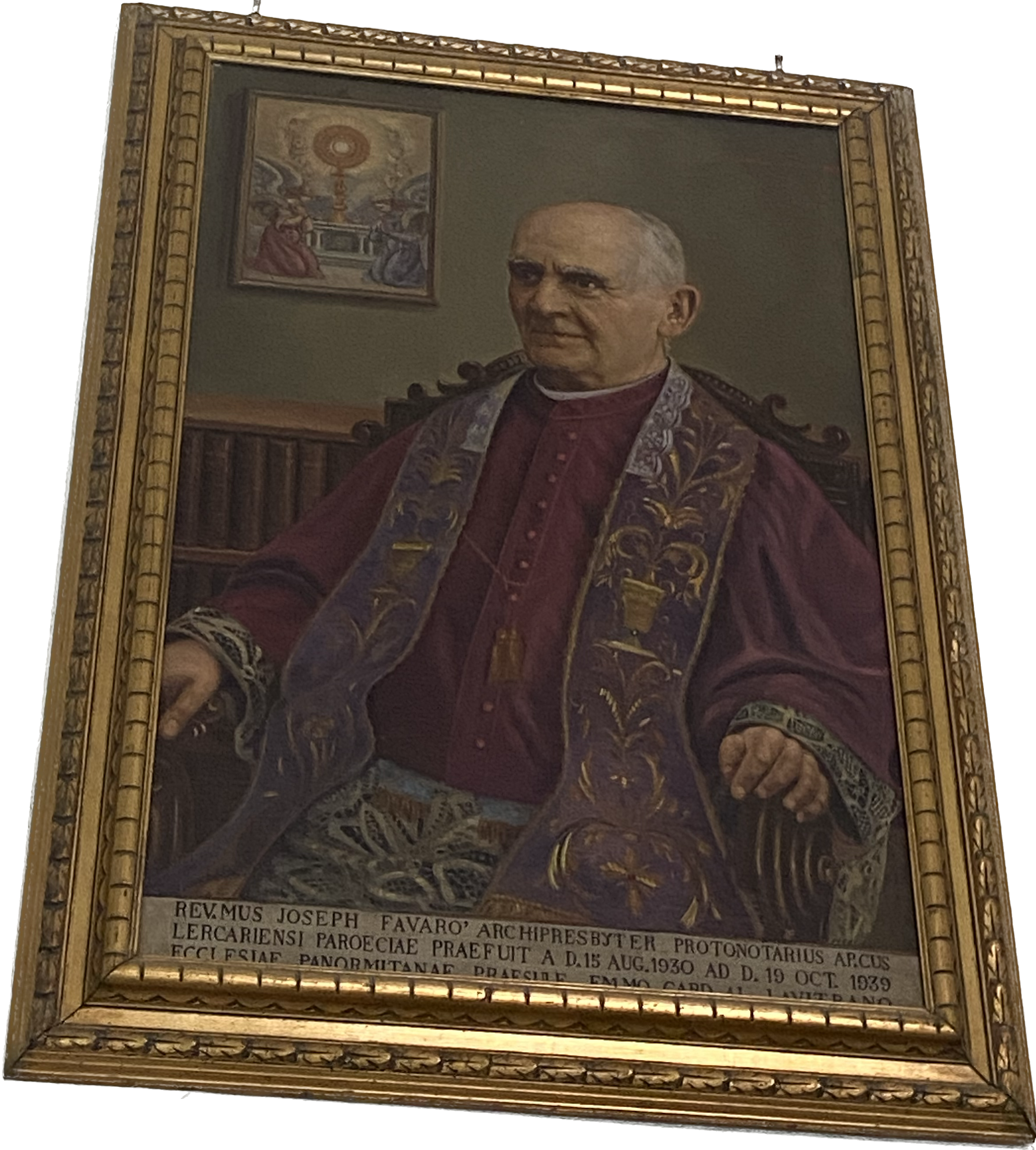
Portrait of Archpriest Favarò

=== 17th century ===
- Giuseppe Marchese (1664–1675)
- Giovanni Facella (1675–1692)
- Leonardo Melli (1693–1710)

=== 18th century ===
- Pietro d'Amico (1711–1733)
- Giuseppe Lombardo (1733–1775)
- Gioacchino Perollo (1775–1788)
- Stefano Lorenzo Petta (1788–1820)

=== 19th century ===
- Francesco Ferrara (1820–1824)
- Gaspare Giglio (1824–1853)
- Mario Fiorentino (1853–1871)
- Giacomo Paci (1871–1904)

=== 20th century ===
- Giuseppe Marino (1904–1929)
- Giuseppe Giusto Favarò (1929–1939)
- Gioacchino Garofalo (1939–1940)
- Filippo Agliarloro (1940–1946)
- Giuseppe Giordano (1946–1952)
- Giuseppe Germanà (1952–1958)
- Francesco Castelluzzo (1958–1968)
- Rosario Catalano (1968–1987)
- Mario Cassata (1988–2023)

=== 21st Century ===
- Massimo Pernice (2023-) (Note: The position of Archpriest is currently vacant, Pernice serves as acting Archpriest)

== Notable people ==
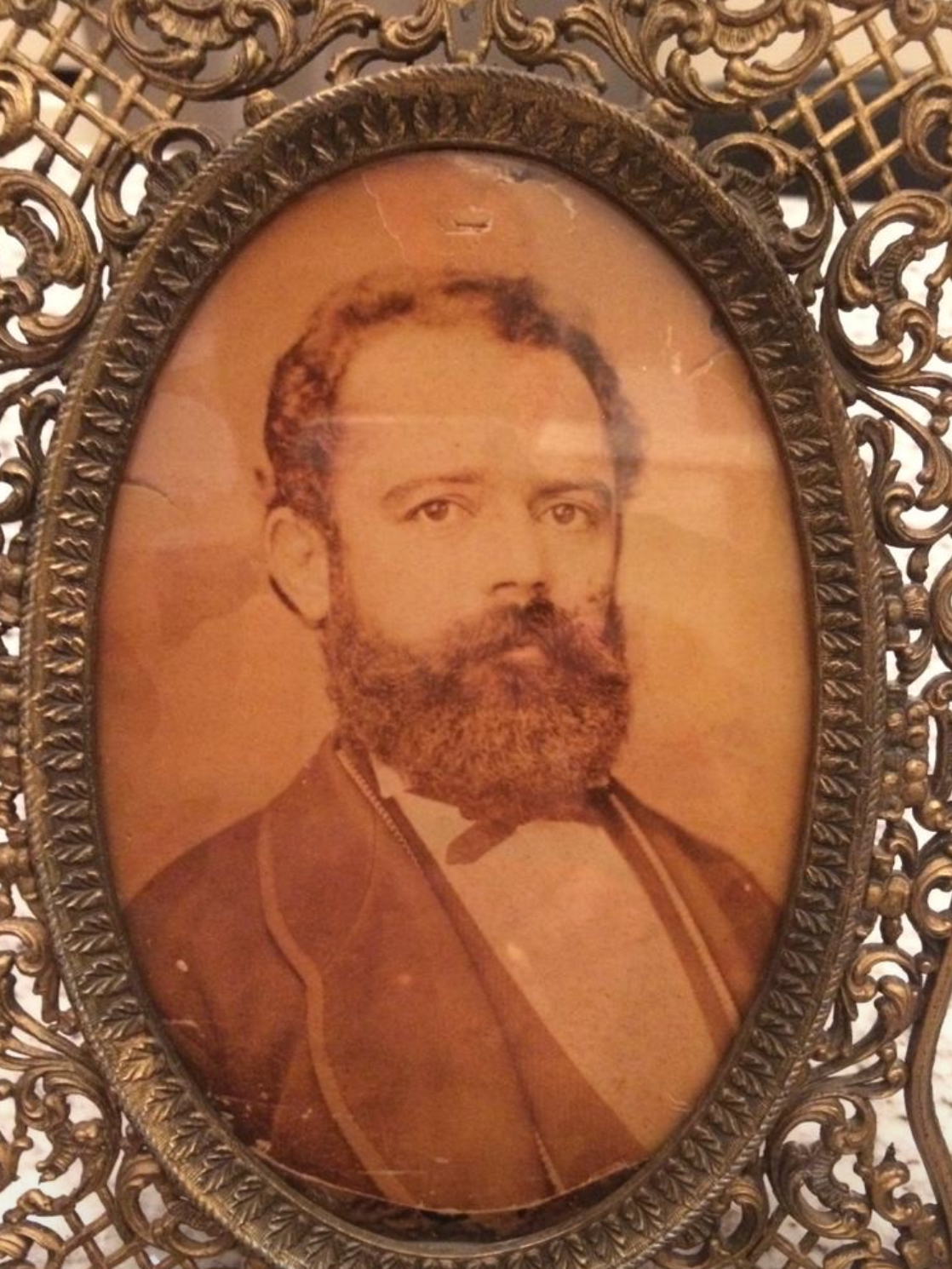
Photograph of Giusto Favarò

- Giusto Favarò (1842–1919), helped establish the Lercarese Cassa Rurale. (Note: Favarò was born in Misilmeri in 1842, where he resided until c. 1861)
- Alfonso Giordano (1843–1915), Doctor, pioneer of occupational medicine
- Andrea Finocchiaro Aprile (1878–1964), politician
- Mauro Picone (1885–1977), mathematician
- Anthony Martin Sinatra (1892–1969), professional boxer and father of singer, Frank Sinatra (1915–1998)
- Attilio Catalano (1894–1951), the father of Guy Williams
- Giuseppe Valentinetti (1896–1957), father of Vito Valentinetti
- Lucky Luciano (1897–1962), crime boss
- Jack La Rue (1902–1984), Italian-American Actor
- Biagio Favarò (1906–1991), Commander of the Order of Malta
- Pietro Scaglione (1906–1971), magistrate
- Angelo Piraino Leto (1909–1994), magistrate, father-in-law of Paolo Borsellino
- Calcedonio Favarò (1910–1976), helped establish the CARITAS Branch of Lercara along with his wife, Concetta Rolandi
- Nicolò Nicolosi (1912–1986), football player and manager
- Concetta Rolandi (1914–1999), first female doctor of Lercara Friddi, helped establish the Lercara Friddi CARITAS Branch, along with her husband, Calcedonio Favarò (Note: Concetta Rolandi was born in Palermo to Luigi Alberto Rolandi (1868-1943), from Colle di Val d'Elsa, and Luisa Settegrani (1875-1958), but lived for over 50 years at Lercara. She and her husband, who was born and raised in Lercara, Calcedonio Favarò, were the parents of Mayor Biagio A. Favarò of Lercara (1941-2022))
- Frédéric François (b. 1950), singer-composer
- Salvatore Vicari (b. 1981), Italian footballer
