= Salvatore Vicari =

Italian footballer

Personal information
- Date of birth: 31 January 1981 (age 45)
- Place of birth: Lercara Friddi, Italy
- Height: 1.78 m (5 ft 10 in)
- Position: Midfielder

Team information
- Current team: Nocerina

Youth career
- 1994–1999: Palermo

Senior career*
| Years | Team | Apps | (Gls) |
| 1998–1999 | Palermo | 24 | (2) |
| 1999–2007 | Reggina | 56 | (1) |
| 2002–2003 | → Messina (loan) | 31 | (1) |
| 2003–2004 | → Ascoli (loan) | 14 | (0) |
| 2004 | → Verona (loan) | 10 | (0) |
| 2004–2005 | → Catanzaro (loan) | 18 | (1) |
| 2006 | → Avellino (loan) | 12 | (1) |
| 2006–2007 | → Cisco Roma (loan) | 16 | (3) |
| 2007–2009 | Monza | 63 | (3) |
| 2009– | Nocerina | | |

International career
| 2001 | Italy U21 | 6 | (0) |
- * Club domestic league appearances and goals

Salvatore Vicari (born 31 January 1981) is an Italian footballer.

== Career ==
=== Palermo ===
Vicari started his youth career at Albatros Lercara. In summer 1994, he joined the youth rank of Palermo.

Vicari made his first team debut at 1998-99 Serie C1 season. He played 24 league matches and scored 2 goals. Palermo failed to win promotion, however, as the team finished runner-up and lost to Savoia in the promotion playoffs.

=== Reggina ===
After the season, he was sold to Reggina at Serie A. In the first season, Vicari played twice for first team and played at youth level. In the second season, he was promoted to first team in December 2000. He played 21 league matches for the Serie A struggler, which lost to Verona in relegation playoffs. At Serie B, he became a first team regular and scored 1 goal. Reggina finished 3rd and won Serie A promotion.

Vicari was not in the plan of Reggina's Serie A campaign, and he was loaned to Messina, last year struggling at Serie B. At his second Sicilian club, he played 31 league matches and scored once against local rival and former club Palermo.

At 2003-04 season, he was loaned to Ascoli of Serie B which finished mid-table. He failed to play regularly and he was sold to Verona of Serie B in co-ownership bid on 30 January 2004. He played 10 matches in a total of 792 minutes.

At 2004-05 season, he was loaned to Serie B newcomer Catanzaro. He played 18 matches in a total of just 994 minutes for the Serie B struggler. he scored his only goal verse his former club Verona, which the match finished in 1-4 lost.

Vicari was excluded at Reggina first team at 2005-06 season. In January 2006, he was loaned to another Serie B struggler Avellino, which he played 12 league matches and 2 playoffs, in a total of just 494 and 26 minutes.

As his contract was reported set to expire in 2007, Vicari was loaned to Cisco Roma of Serie C2, which the team aim to promotion. He played 16 matches for the team as a regular starter.

=== Monza ===
In January 2007, he left for Monza. Sometimes he played at starter for the Serie C1 clubs. In December 2009 he signed a contract with A.S.G. Nocerina.
