= Alfonso Giordano =

Italian Doctor and Mayor of Lercara Friddi (1876–1877; 1902–1903)

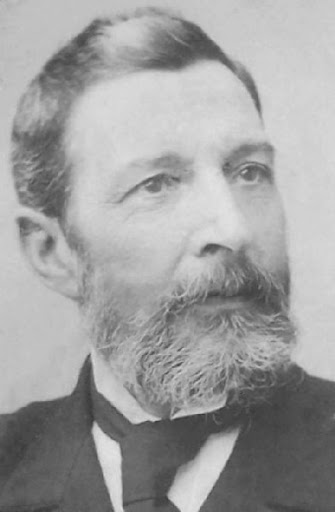

Mayor of Lercara Friddi
- In office 7 October 1902 – 16 September 1903
- Preceded by: Gioacchino Furitano
- Succeeded by: Giuseppe Scarlata
- In office 1876–1877
- Preceded by: Giovanni Nicolosi
- Succeeded by: Giulio Sartorio

Personal details
- Born: Alfonso Maria Giordano; 11 January 1843 Lercara Friddi, Kingdom of the Two Sicilies
- Died: 15 July 1915 (aged 72) Lercara Friddi, Province of Palermo, Kingdom of Italy
- Spouse: Caterina Nicolosi
- Children: 2
- Occupation: Doctor

Alfonso Giordano (Lercara Friddi, 11 January 1843 – Lercara Friddi, 15 July 1915) was an Italian Doctor and humanist, and one of the Pioneers of occupational medicine, who highlighted the squalid work conditions of the Sulfur Mines of Lercara Friddi. He also served as Mayor of Lercara Friddi.

== Early life ==
Alfonso Maria Giordano was born in Lercara Friddi on 11 January 1843, the son of Giuseppe Giordano (1803–1883), a doctor, and Donna Anna Miceli (1807–1887), a noblewoman. He was their 4th child. His parents both came from well-established Lercarese families, with the Giordano family having been present in Lercara since the early 18th century, after the arrival of Giovanni Giordano and his wife Angiola Lummina of Siracusa. The family can still be found in Lercara to this day.His father, Giuseppe, was one of the 'decurioni' (Municipal Administrators) of Lercara Friddi, from 1836 to 1840, serving alongside several notable Lercaresi, such as Gaetano Anzalone, Vincenzo Bongiovanni, Calcedonio Catalano, and Salvatore Sartorio.

== Career ==
He practiced his profession in his hometown, and had inherited some Sulfur Mines from his father. Being in daily contact with the working class of the mines, he decided to provide them daily care and began to study mining hygiene at the University of Palermo. He eventually became the first Sicilian to obtain a lectureship in mining hygiene, and taught for over a decade at the University of Palermo. Following in the footsteps of Ramazzini (the renowned 18th-century physician from Carpi), he identified and denounced the skeletal deformities of the destitute “carusi,” that is, minors employed in the harsh and exhausting labor of sulfur mines. He discovered and described ankylostomiasis, a social disease characterized by severe anemia—often fatal if not diagnosed and treated in time—which miners contracted due to the habit of working barefoot in the mines. He also argued for, and attempted to document with the limited means available at the time, the existence among sulfur miners of a disease he called “theapneumoconiosis,” caused—similarly to what had been observed in coal mines—by the accumulation of particles of the yellow mineral in the lung tissue, often with fatal consequences. He was an advocate for legal regulations that, at the time, established limits on mining labor. He maintained an active scientific correspondence with the great Louis Pasteur, becoming his friend and, through his intervention, receiving an honorary degree in mining hygiene in Paris. He also served twice as Mayor of Lercara Friddi. After his death in Lercara on July 15, 1915, the miners—grateful for Giordano's tireless and selfless work—placed a plaque on his birthplace. Two roads were also dedicated to him in Lercara Friddi and in Palermo.

== Family ==
Giordano was married to Caterina Nicolosi on 14 December 1872 in the Church of Maria Santissima della Neve, Lercara Friddi. Several of his children and grandchildren followed in his footsteps: his grandson Alfonso (1910–1990), was a doctor and professor at the Accademia Nazionale dei Lincei. Another grandson, also named Alfonso (1928–2021), was a judge and presided over the Maxi Trial.

Ancestors of Alfonso Giordano

12. Giovanni Giordano
8. Pasquale Vitale Giordano (1745–1845)
13. Angiola Maria Lummina
4. Stefano Giordano (1782–1837)
14. Melchiorre Gaspare Catalano (1739–1809)
9. Francesca Catalano (1758–?)
15. Antonina Rosalia Barsalona (1741–?)
2. Giuseppe Maria Giordano (1803–1883)
5. Giuseppa Formica (1782–?)
1. Alfonso Maria Giordano (1843–1915)
10. Simone Miceli
6. Gaspare di Miceli (1777–?)
11. Anna Ficarrotta
3. Anna (di) Miceli (1807–1887)
7. Vincenza Bongiovanni (1777–1836)
