= Francesco Maria Emanuele Gaetani =

Sicilian nobleman

Francesco Maria Emanuele Gaetani, marquis of Villabianca
- Born: 12 March 1720; Palermo
- Died: 6 February 1802 (aged 81); Palermo
- Occupation: historian
- Writing career
- Subject: Sicilian history
- Notable work: Della Sicilia Nobile

Francesco Maria Emanuele Gaetani (1720–1802), marquis of Villabianca, was a Sicilian nobleman and historian.

== Life ==
Gaetani was born in Palermo, and held public office there. He was senator of the city in 1775–76. He studied and wrote about the history of Sicily. He died in Palermo in 1802.

== Publications ==
His principal publication was Della Sicilia Nobile, published in five parts between 1754 and 1775, the last part of the appendix published posthumously in 1897.

- Della Sicilia Nobile (1754-1775). Palermo: Stamperia dei Santi Apostoli per Pietro Bencivenga
  - Part 1 (1754) archive.org
    - Introduction, pp.I-XXIV
    - Book 1, General Description of Sicily, pp.1-70
    - Book 2, Magistrates of the Kingdom, pp.71-100
    - Book 3, Kings of Sicily, pp.101-230
    - Book 4, Presidents of the Three Supreme Tribunals with Judges, pp.231-258
    - Index to Part 1, pp.259-292
  - Part 2 (1754), pp.1- books.google.com archive.org
    - Introduction to the Baronage of the Kingdom, pp.3-12
    - Book 1, Baronage of the Kingdom - Princes, pp.13-210
    - Index of Fiefdoms, pp.211-212
    - Index of Families, pp.213-216
  - Continuation of Part 2 (1757) books.google.com
  - Part 3 (1759) books.google.com
  - Appendix, Volume 1 (1775) books.google.com
  - Appendix (1897), published by Carlo Crispo Moncada and Antonino Mango, Palermo: O. Fiorenza.

Among his other works are:

- Notizie storiche intorno agli antichi sette uffizi del Regno di Sicilia, published in two parts in: Opuscoli di Autori Siciliani, Palermo: Stamperia dei Santi Apostoli
  - Part I, in volume VIII (1764)
  - Part II, in volume XI (1770)
- Catalogo di tutti i parti letterarj editi, ed inediti specialmente intorno a storia sicola-palermitana, Palermo: Stamperia di d. Rosario Abbate in Piazza Bologni (1791)

His Diari della Città di Palermo, annals from 1743 to 1802, were published posthumously, as were his 48 Opuscoli palermitani on local topics.
