= Lercaro =

Lercaro is a surname of Italian origin. Notable people with this surname include:

- Catalina Lercaro (16th century), Italian-Canarian woman of the Lercaro family, a noble dynasty of Genoese merchants
- Giacomo Lercaro (1891–1976), Italian Roman Catholic Archbishop and Cardinal
