= Christian Giordano =

Swiss sociologist and anthropologist (1945–2018)

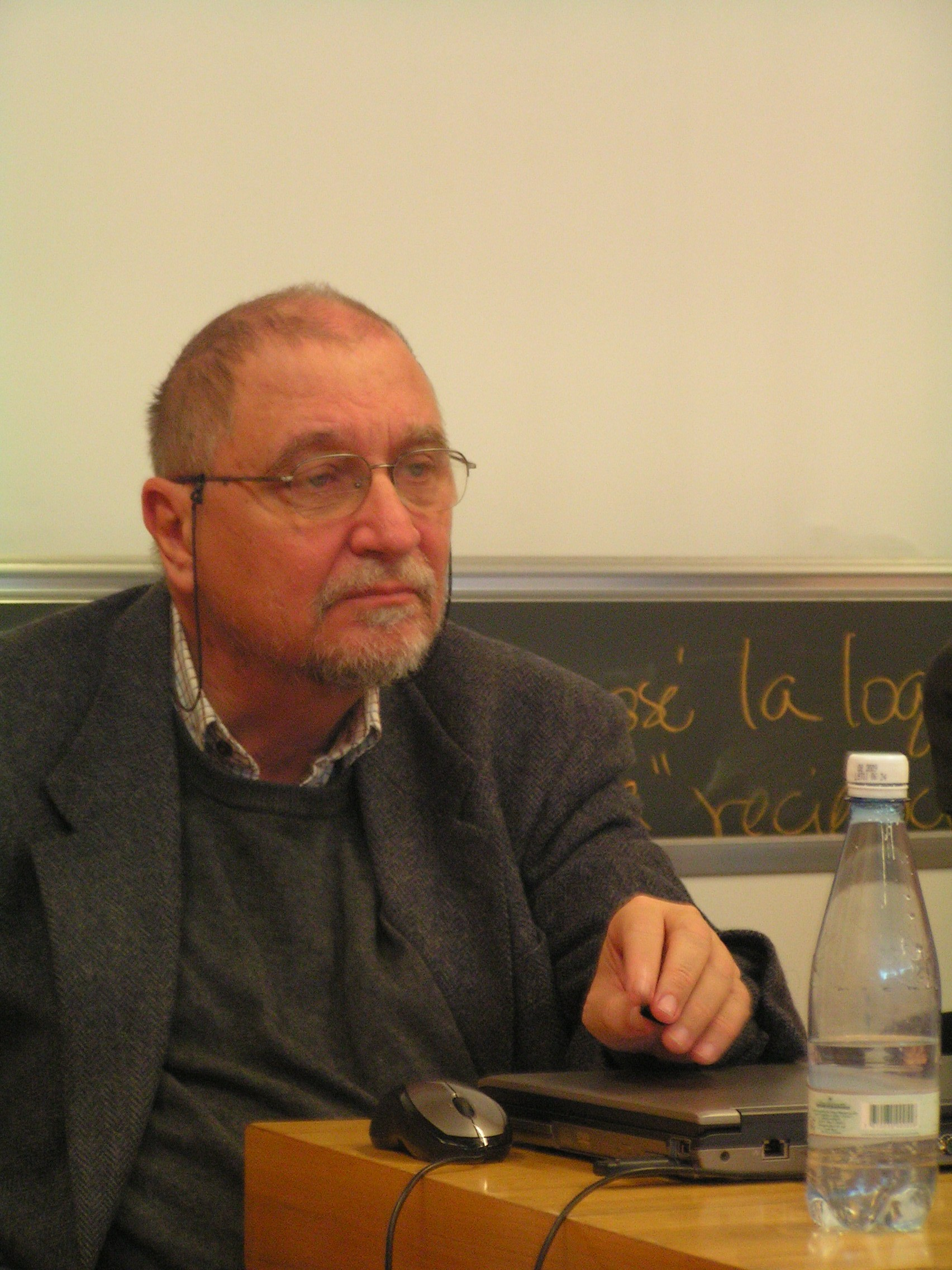
Giordano

Christian Giordano (October 27, 1945 - December 29, 2018) was a Swiss anthropologist and sociologist born in Lugano, Switzerland. Since 1989, he has been Professor of Ethnology and Social Anthropology and Head of the Institute of Social Anthropology at the University of Fribourg in Switzerland. He has also been teaching 'Contemporary Social Theories' at the UNESCO Chair in Intercultural Exchanges, Bucharest in Romania.

Giordano is co-founder of Anthropological Journal on European Cultures. He was chief editor of Freiburg Studies in Social Anthropology and part of the editorial board of the journals Ethnologia Balkanica, Focaal, Etudes Rurales, Eastern European Countryside, Sociologija. Mintis ir veiksmas.

Giordano studied anthropology, art history and Romance languages at the University of Heidelberg, as well as law and economics at the University of Bern. He obtained his PhD in sociology from Heidelberg University in 1973, habilitation in cultural anthropology and European ethnology from Frankfurt University in 1987 and doctor honoris causa from the West University of Timișoara in 1999.

Giordano died on December 29, 2018.

== Main publications ==
- Handwerker- und Bauernverbände in der sizilianischen Gesellschaft. Zünfte, Handwerkerkonfraternitäten und Arbeiterhilfsvereine zwischen 1750 und 1890 (Artisans and Farmers in Sicilian society). Tübingen: Mohr, 1975.
- Die Betrogenen der Geschichte. Überlagerungsmentalität und Überlagerungsrationalität in mediterranen Gesellschaften (The Dupes of History). Frankfurt, New York: Campus, 1992.
- Ogledi o interkulturnoj komunikaciji (Essays in Intercultural Communication ). Belgrade: Biblioteka XX Vek, 2001.
- Власт, недоверие и наследство: Скептична антропология (Power, Mistrust and Legacy: Sceptical Anthropology). София: Полис, 2006.
- Power, Legitimacy, Historical Legacies: A Disenchanted Political Anthropology. Berlin, Münster, Zurich: Lit-Verlag, 2015.
