= JoAnn Giordano =

American textile artist (born 1949)

JoAnn Giordano (born 1949) is an American textile artist and curator who has exhibited since 1977.

== Personal life and education ==
Giordano was born in 1949 in Newark, New Jersey. She has studied at Purdue University, Rhode Island School of Design, and the Cranbrook Academy of Art. In 1988, she earned an MFA in Fiber from the Cranbrook Academy of Art.

== Exhibitions ==
Giordano has shown her work internationally in Mexico and Japan. She has been exhibited in the Cleveland Museum of Art, and the Ohio Craft Museum. She had a one-person exhibitions at the Womans Building in Los Angeles and at Artemisa Gallery in Chicago. Her work was included in an exhibition at the Textile Museum in Washington, DC.

== Teaching ==
An art educator, Giordano has taught since 1979, including classes sponsored by the Cleveland Museum of Art, LaGuardia Community College, Young Audiences of Greater Cleveland, Kent State University and Case Western University.

== Reception ==
Feature articles on her work have appeared in Surface Design Journal and FiberArts magazine, and her work has been reviewed in the New Art Examiner. Surface Design Journal published a five page feature article by Janet Koplos (held in the Smithsonian Institution Archives of American Art) on Giordano entitled JoAnn Giordano: The Earthy and the Cosmic.

== Collections ==
Giordano's work is in the permanent collection of the Ohio Craft Museum, the Lafayette Museum of Art, Indiana and the Century Center in South Bend, Indiana. The Smithsonian Archives of American Art contains an archive file from the Women's Building with documentation of her work.
