= Silvia Giordani =

Italian chemist

- Born: 1973 (age 52–53)
- Education: University of Miami; University of Milan
- Scientific career
- Workplaces: Trinity College Dublin; University of Trieste; Dublin City University
- Thesis: Digital processing and communication at the molecular level (2004)

Silvia Giordani (born 1973) is an Italian chemist who is Professor of Nanomaterials at Dublin City University. Her research considers carbon-based functional materials for biotechnology. She was awarded a L'Oréal-UNESCO For Women in Science fellowship in 2012.

== Early life and education ==
Giordani was born in Bergamo in Italy. She was an undergraduate student at the University of Milan, where she completed a Laura in pharmaceutical chemistry. Whilst studying Giordani worked as a chemical health analyst in the Public Health Laboratory of Bergamo. Whilst visiting her uncle in the United States for a study vacation she was awarded a doctoral scholarship, and eventually ended up a graduate student at the University of Miami. Her doctoral research considered digital processing at the molecular level. She moved to Trinity College Dublin for her first postdoctoral research position. Giordani moved to the University of Trieste for a scientific fellowship.

== Research and career ==
Giordani was awarded the President of Ireland Young Researcher Award to start her independent scientific career at Trinity College Dublin. She worked as an assistant professor at TCD for six years, before launching her own research laboratory at the Istituto Italiano di Tecnologia. Her research group considered nano-carbon materials. She moved to the University of Turin as an associate professor in 2016. Soon after, she was appointed a full Professor Chair of Nanomaterials within the School of Chemical Sciences at Dublin City University. Her research considers nanomaterials and the design of personalised drug delivery systems.

== Awards and honours ==
- 2012 L'Oréal-UNESCO For Women in Science Awards Fellowship
- 2014 Royal Irish Academy Women in Science
- 2018 University of Otago William Evans Fellowship
- 2020 High Level Scientific Mobility Grant

== Selected publications ==
- Prabhpreet Singh; Stéphane Campidelli; Silvia Giordani; Davide Bonifazi; Alberto Bianco; Maurizio Prato (22 June 2009). "Organic functionalisation and characterisation of single-walled carbon nanotubes". Chemical Society Reviews. 38 (8): 2214–2230. doi:10.1039/b518111a. ISSN 0306-0012. PMID 19623345. Wikidata Q37558244.
- Françisco M. Raymo; Silvia Giordani (1 May 2001). "Signal processing at the molecular level". Journal of the American Chemical Society. 123 (19): 4651–4652. doi:10.1021/ja005699n. ISSN 0002-7863. PMID 11457272. Wikidata Q49324891.
- Giada Cellot; Emanuele Cilia; Sara Cipollone; et al. (21 December 2008). "Carbon nanotubes might improve neuronal performance by favouring electrical shortcuts". Nature Nanotechnology. 4 (2): 126–133. doi:10.1038/nnano.2008.374. ISSN 1748-3387. PMID 19197316. Wikidata Q59899714.
