= Silvia Giordano =

Italian computer scientist

Silvia Giordano Cremonese is an Italian computer scientist. She works in Switzerland as professor of complex and pervasive networks and head of the Networking Laboratory at SUPSI, the University of Applied Sciences and Arts of Southern Switzerland.

== Education and career ==
Giordano earned a laurea (the Italian equivalent of a master's degree) in 1987, from the University of Pisa in Italy. After working in Pisa for the National Research Council of Italy, she moved to the Swiss National Supercomputing Centre in 1991. From 1995 to 1998 she was a doctoral student at the École Polytechnique Fédérale de Lausanne (EPFL) in Switzerland. After completing her doctorate, she continued at EPFL as a faculty member from 1999 until 2003, when she moved to her present position at SUPSI. She also chairs the IFIP Working Group 6.3 on the Performance of Communication Systems.

== Research ==
Giordano's early research concerned routing and performance analysis for ad hoc networks, including Body area networks, underwater acoustic communication, and edge computing. A more recent line of research, highlighted in her keynote speech at the 35th International Teletraffic Congress on Networked Systems and Services, involves tracking disinformation on social media, and studies the effectiveness of regulation in safeguarding privacy and preventing disinformation.

== Awards and honors ==
Giordano was elected an ACM Distinguished Member in 2014.
