= Church of Maria Santissima della Neve, Lercara Friddi =

Church in Lercara Friddi, Sicily, Italy

Coordinates: 37.7480°N 13.6033°E

Church of Maria Santissima della Neve
- Duomo di Maria Santissima della Neve, Chiesa Madre di Lercara Friddi e dei Lercaresi
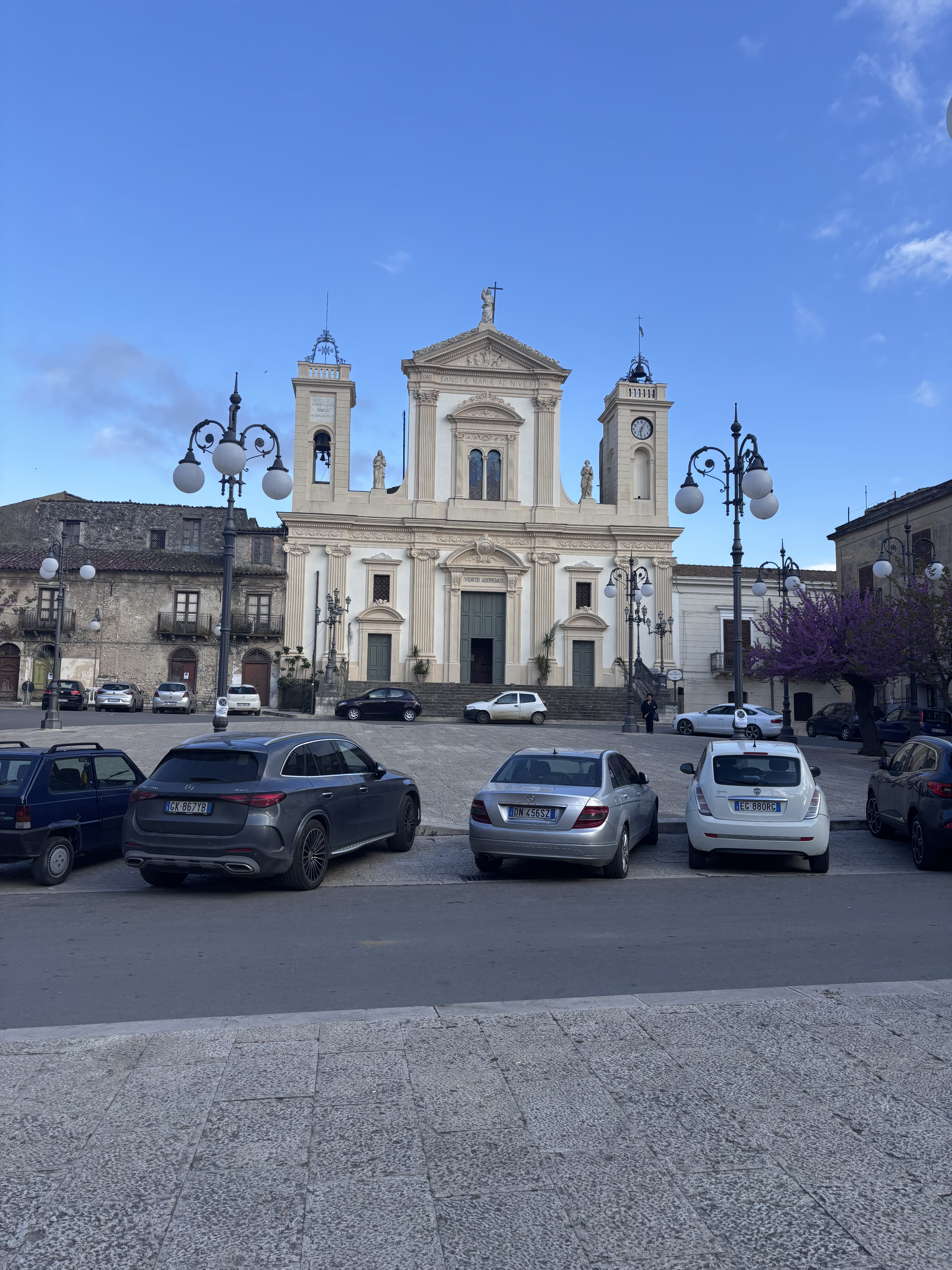
- The church in 2025, after the 2024 renovations
- Church of Maria Santissima della Neve
- Location: Lercara Friddi, Sicily
- Country: Italy
- Denomination: Roman Catholic

History
- Founded: 1702
- Founder: Leonardo Melli
- Dedicated: 1750
- Consecrated: 1721

Architecture
- Style: Baroque
- Years built: 1702-1721

Administration
- Diocese: Diocese of Palermo
- Parish: Maria Santissima della Neve

Clergy
- Priest: Padre Massimo Pernice

The Church of Maria Santissima della Neve (Italian: Duomo di Maria Santissima della Neve) is a Roman Catholic church located in Lercara Friddi, Sicily. The church, dedicated to Saint Mary of the Snows, was constructed in 1702 as the mother church of Lercara Friddi.

== History ==
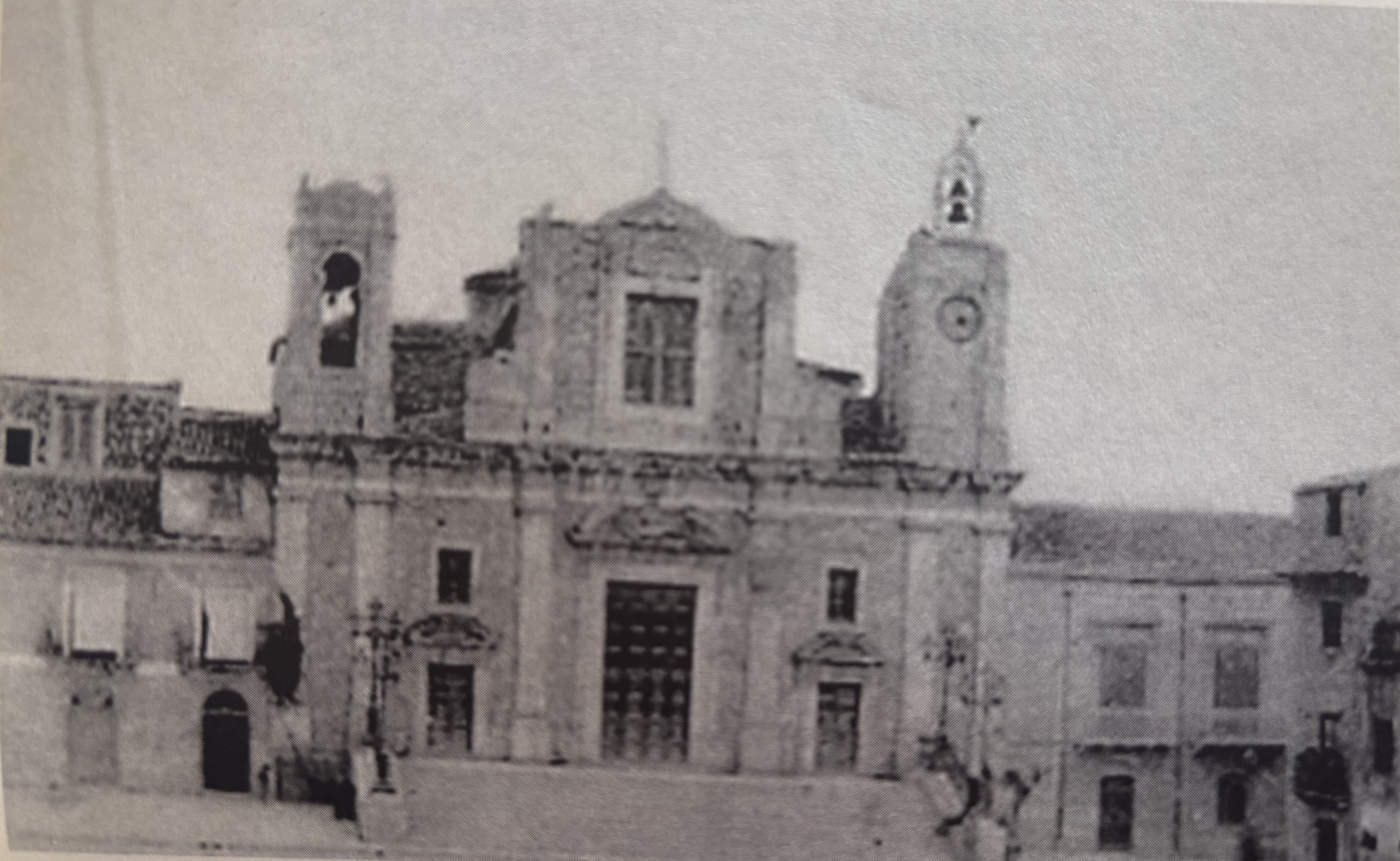
The church c. 1910, before its major reconstruction

The current church replaced an older one (situated at the current 7 Via Pucci) dedicated to Our Lady of the Rosary, built between 1595 and 1604 by Baldassare Gomez de Amezcua, founder of Lercara Friddi. The Archpriest of Lercara Friddi, Leonardo Melli, ordered the construction of a new church in 1702, which took place between 1702 and 1721. The church is built on the Latin cross plan and has three naves. It was inaugurated by Archpriest Pietro d'Amico.

The church contains various artworks by famous Sicilian artists, such as Il Zoppo di Gangi. The two altars were erected in 1760 and 1765 respectively. The baptismal font was renovated in 1923.

The church has been renovated numerous times. The first renovation was in 1910, with a reconstruction of the façade. The latest renovation was in 2024, with a restoration and further renovation of the façade. The crypt housed the burials of many Lercaresi until the construction of the cemetery in 1896.

== Burials ==
The church contains several important burials, such as:

- Leonardo Melli, Archpriest from 1693 to 1710
- Pietro d'Amico, Archpriest from 1711 to 1733
- Giuseppe Lombardo, Archpriest from 1733 to 1775
- Gioacchino Perollo, Archpriest from 1775 to 1788
- Stefano Lorenzo Petta, Archpriest from 1788 to 1820
- Francesco Ferrara, Archpriest from 1820 to 1824
- Gaspare Giglio, Archpriest from 1824 to 1853
- Mario Fiorentino, Archpriest from 1853 to 1871
- Luigi Ferrara, lawyer
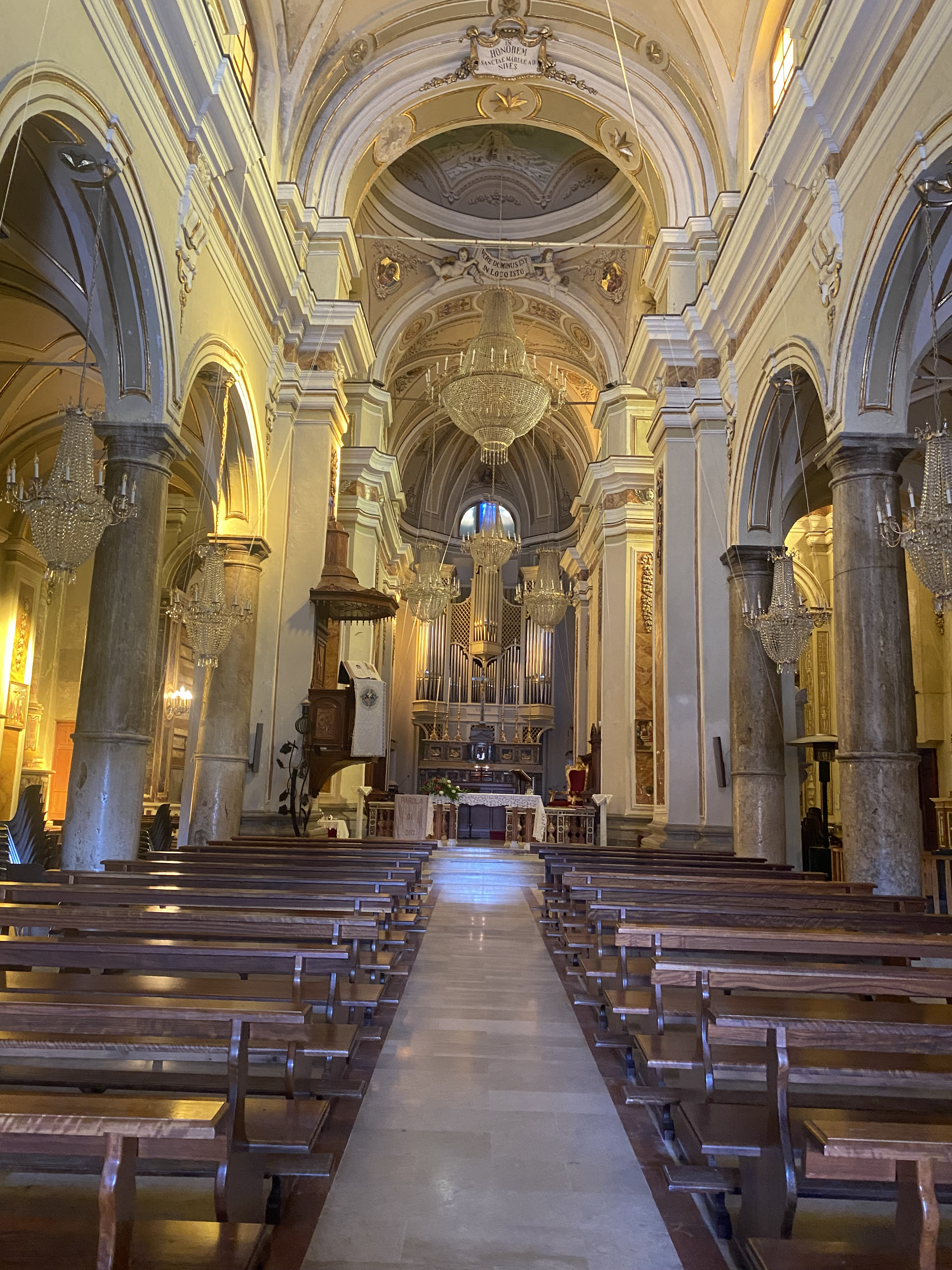
Church interior

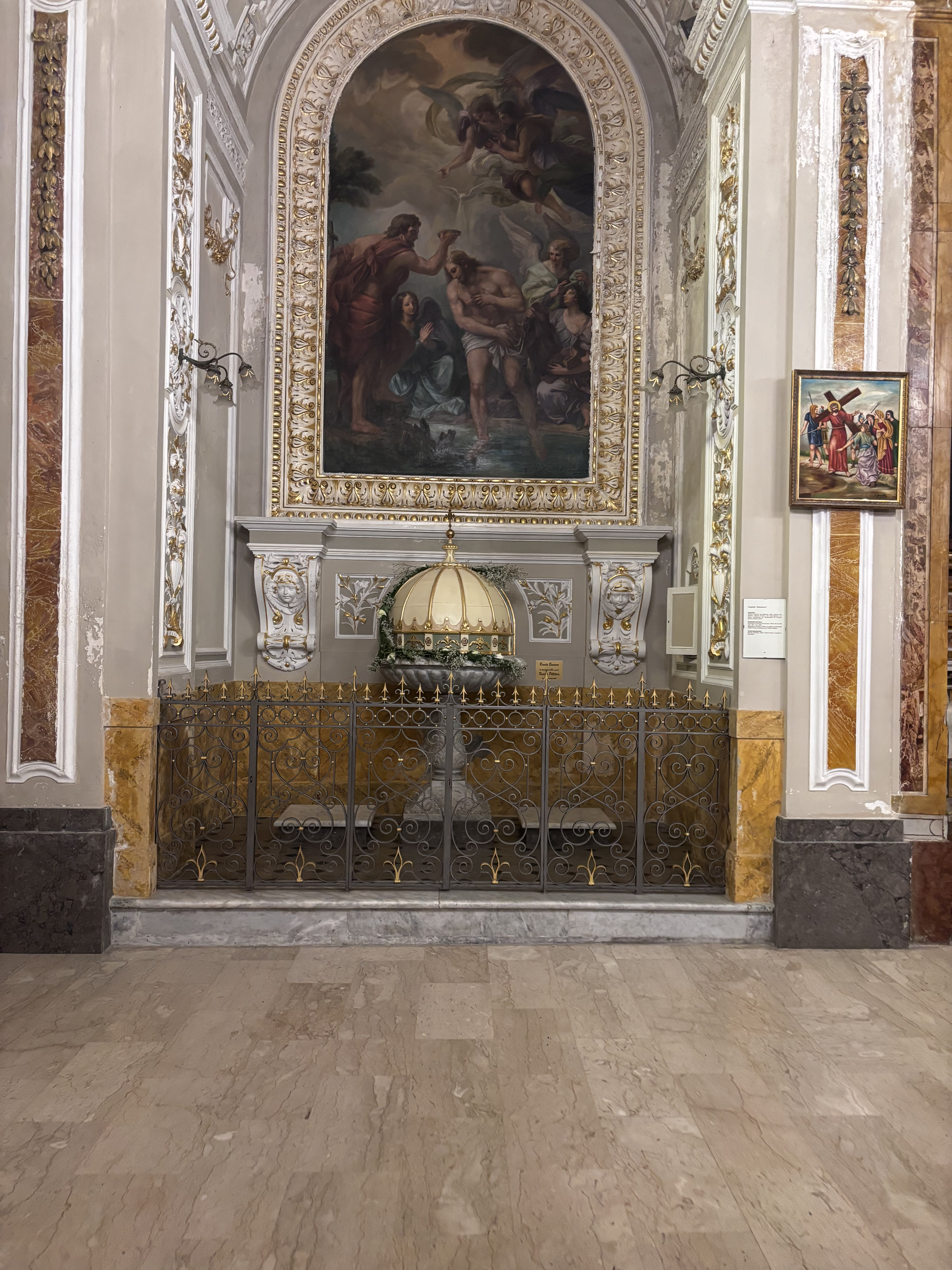
The baptismal font

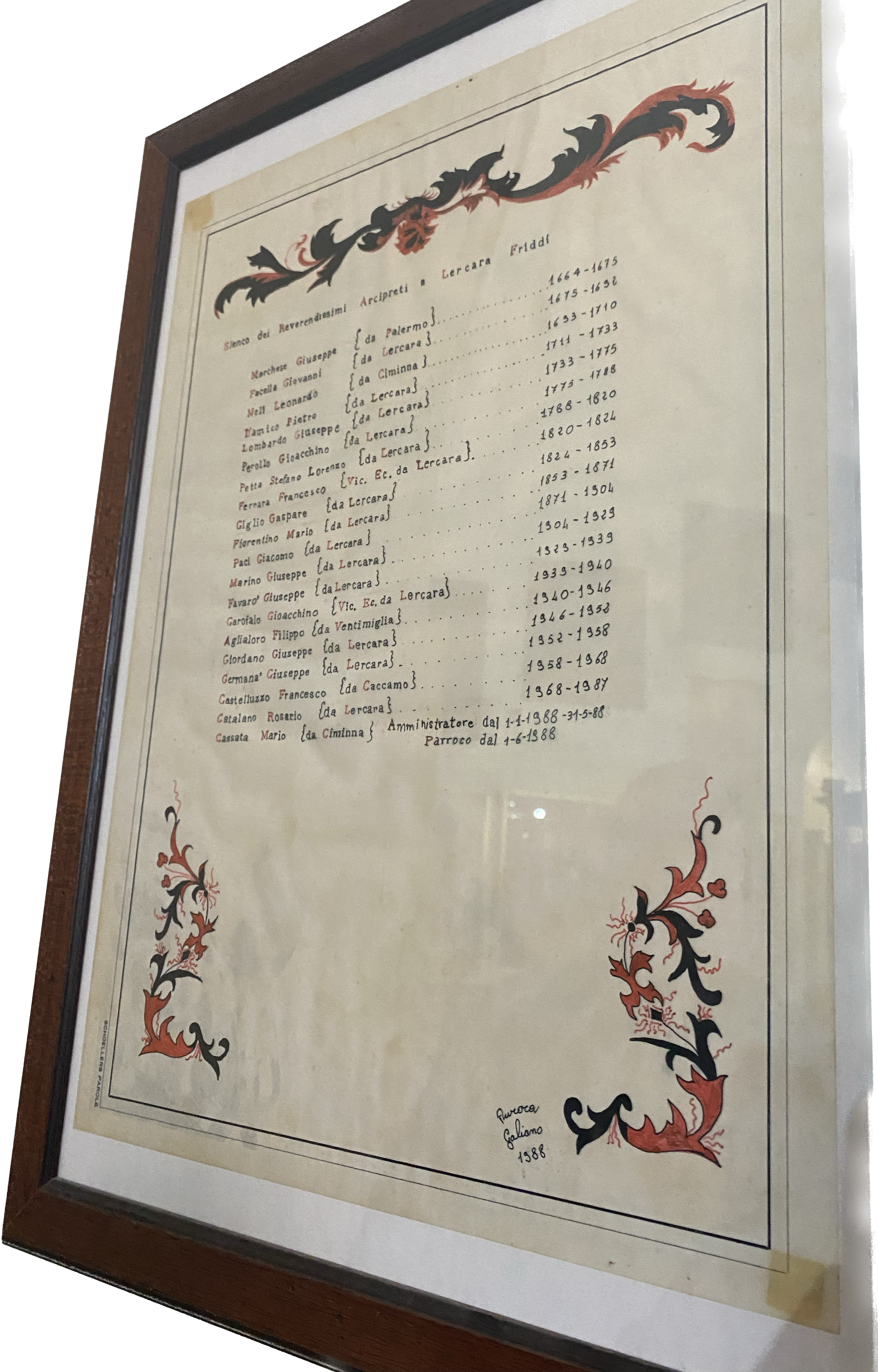
List of Archpriests of Lercara Friddi
