= Giordano Orsini =

Giordano Orsini may refer to:

- Giordano Bobone Orsini (died after 1154), a.k.a. Jordan of Santa Susanna, Carthusian monk, created Cardinal Deacon
- Giordano Orsini (died 1287), cardinal, brother of Pope Nicholas III
- Giordano Orsini (Senatore 1341), Rome's Senatore in 1341, nephew of Pope Nicholas III
- Giordano Orsini (died 1438)
- Giordano Orsini di Monterotondo (1525–1564),
- Jourdan des Ursins, a.k.a. Giordano degli Orsini (died 1564)
