= Alberto Giordani =

Italian footballer (1899-1927)

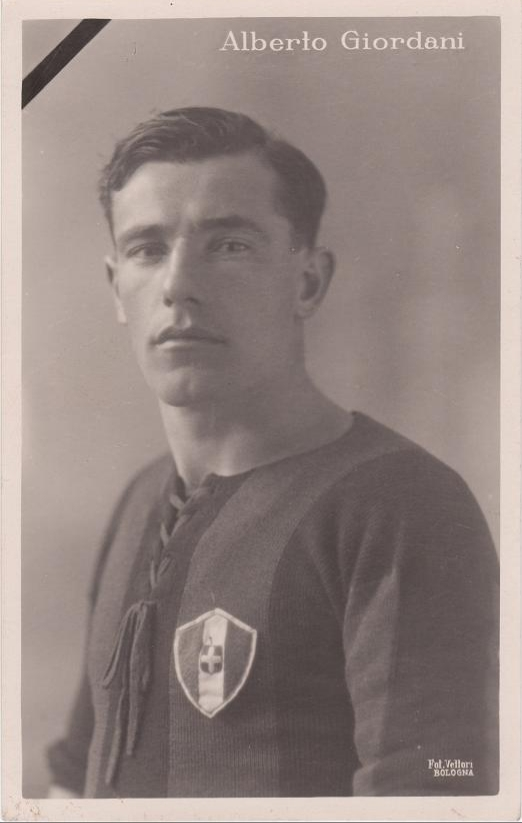

Personal information
- Full name: Alberto Giordani
- Date of birth: 19 April 1899
- Place of birth: Bologna, Italy
- Date of death: 8 November 1927 (aged 28)
- Position: Midfielder

Senior career*
| Years | Team | Apps | (Gls) |
| 1919–1920 | GS Bolognese | ? | (?) |
| 1920–1924 | Virtus Bologna | 41 | (1) |
| 1924–1927 | Bologna | 69 | (3) |

International career
| 1927 | Italy | 1 | (0) |
- * Club domestic league appearances and goals

Alberto Giordani (Italian pronunciation: [alˈbɛrto dʒorˈdaːni]; 19 April 1899 – 8 November 1927) was an Italian footballer who played as a midfielder. On 29 May 1927, he represented the Italy national football team on the occasion of a friendly match against Spain in a 2–0 home win.
