= Baucina =

- Comune
- Comune di Baucina
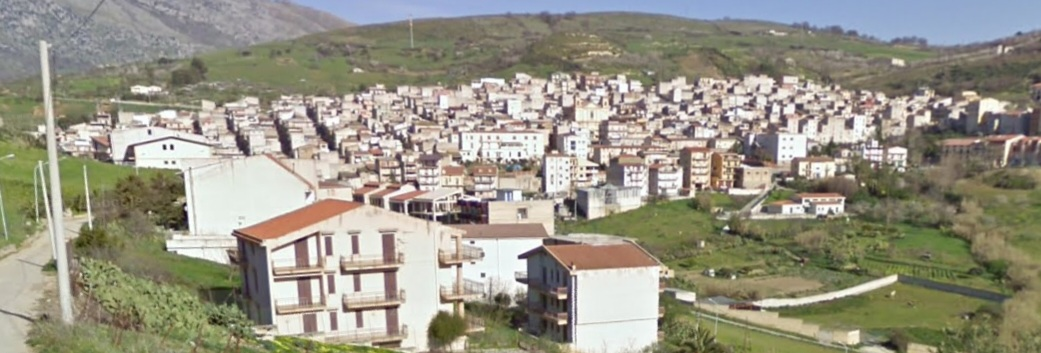
- Panorama view of Baucina (2022)

- Location within Italy Location within Sicily
- Coordinates: 37°56′N 13°32′E
- Country: Italy
- Region: Sicily
- Metropolitan city: Palermo (PA)

Government
  - Mayor: Ciro Coniglio

Area
  - Total: 24.4 km^{2} (9.4 sq mi)

Population (Dec. 2004)
  - Total: 2,003
  - Density: 82.1/km^{2} (213/sq mi)
- Time zone: UTC+1 (CET)
  - Summer (DST): UTC+2 (CEST)
- Postal code: 90020
- Dialing code: 091
- Website: http://www.comune.baucina.pa.it

Baucina is a comune (municipality) in the Metropolitan City of Palermo in the Italian region of Sicily, located about 25 kilometres (16 mi) southeast of Palermo. As of 31 December 2004, it had a population of 2,003 and an area of 24.4 square kilometres (9.4 mi^{2}).

Baucina borders the following municipalities: Bolognetta, Caccamo, Casteldaccia, Ciminna, Ventimiglia di Sicilia, Villafrati.

== Demographic evolution ==
Historical population

Year	Pop.	±%
1861	2,974	—
1871	3,430	+15.3%
1881	3,656	+6.6%
1901	4,468	+22.2%
1911	3,706	−17.1%

Year	Pop.	±%
1921	3,209	−13.4%
1931	2,979	−7.2%
1936	3,154	+5.9%
1951	3,446	+9.3%
1961	2,833	−17.8%

Year	Pop.	±%
1971	2,303	−18.7%
1981	2,217	−3.7%
1991	2,105	−5.1%
2001	2,031	−3.5%

Source: Data from ISTAT
