= Ventimiglia di Sicilia =

- Comune
- Comune di Ventimiglia di Sicilia
- Coat of arms

- Location within Italy Location within Sicily
- Coordinates: 37°55′N 13°34′E
- Country: Italy
- Region: Sicily
- Metropolitan city: Palermo (PA)

Government
  - Mayor: Girolamo Anzalone (Noi per Ventimiglia)

Area
  - Total: 26 km^{2} (10 sq mi)
- Elevation: 540 m (1,770 ft)

Population (2001)
  - Total: 2,193
  - Density: 84/km^{2} (220/sq mi)
- Demonym: Ventimigliesi
- Time zone: UTC+1 (CET)
  - Summer (DST): UTC+2 (CEST)
- Postal code: 90020
- Dialing code: 091
- Patron saint: Maria SS. del Rosario
- Saint day: First Sunday in October
- Website: Official website

Ventimiglia di Sicilia (Sicilian: Calamigna) is a town and comune in the Metropolitan City of Palermo, located in the autonomous region of Sicily, Italy. Though "Ventimiglia di Sicilia" is its official name, in Sicilian, the city is known as Calamigna.

Ventimiglia was founded in the 1620s by Don Girolamo del Carretto. The town was named after his wife, Beatrice Ventimiglia. In 1863, "di Sicilia" was added to Ventimiglia, to differentiate the city from the town of Ventimiglia in Liguria. The city is neighbored by the towns Baucina, Bolognetta, Caccamo, Casteldaccia and Ciminna.

The town is also home to an advanced observatory, the Osservatorio di Ventimiglia di Sicilia "Ezio Brancato" (Ventimiglia di Sicilia Observatory) run by The Organizzazione Ricerche e Studi di Astronomia (Organization for the Research and Study of Astronomy) or ORSA, built in 2001.

There is also an emigrant community from the town in New York City. They have a plot with graves for members of the “Club di Figli Maria SS Rosario / Ventimiglia Sicula” in the “Second Calvary” section of Calvary Cemetery in Queens, New York City.
