= Villafrati =

- Comune
- Comune di Villafrati
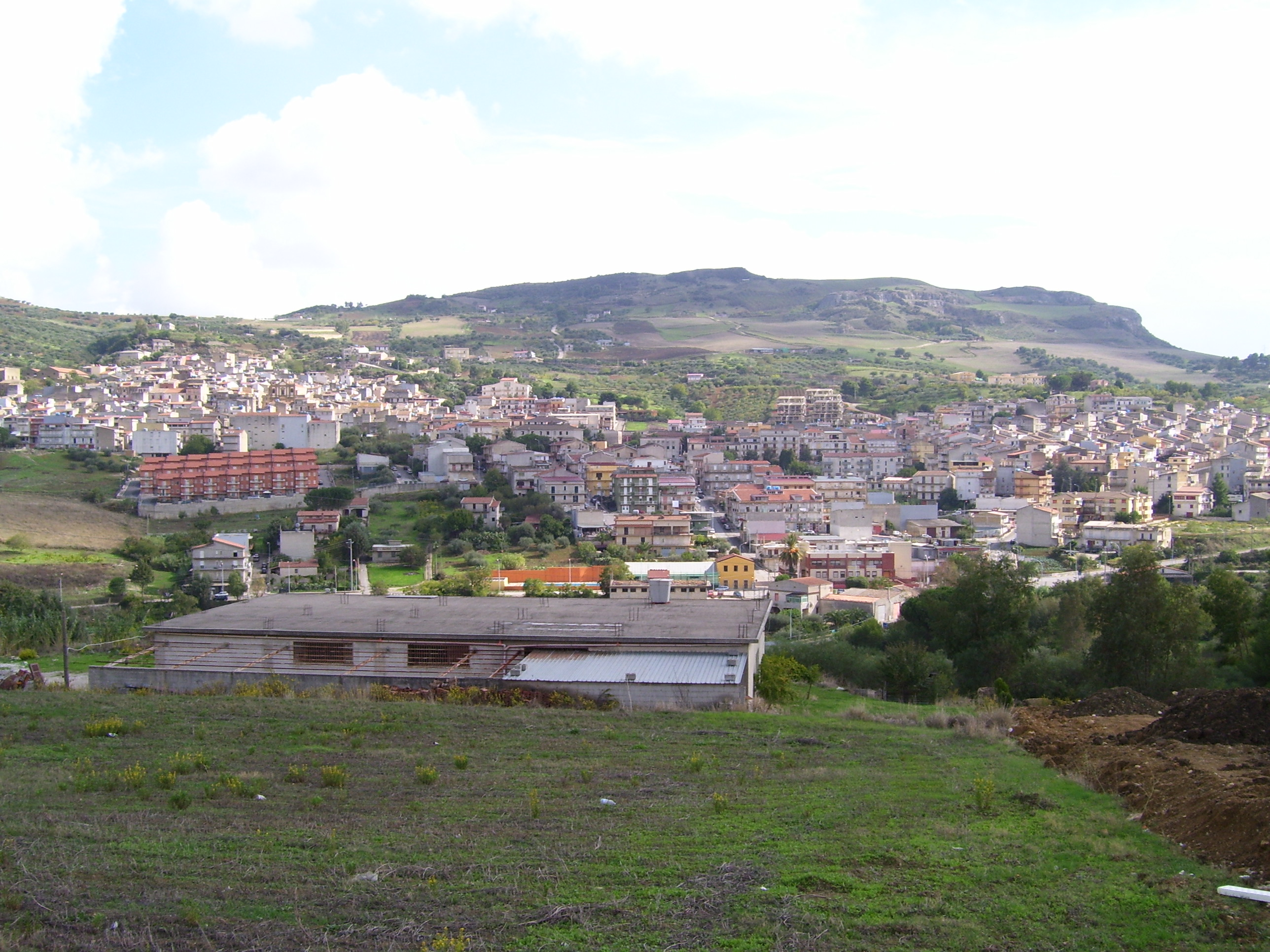

- Location within Italy Location within Sicily
- Coordinates: 37°54′N 13°29′E
- Country: Italy
- Region: Sicily
- Metropolitan city: Palermo (PA)

Area
  - Total: 25.6 km^{2} (9.9 sq mi)
- Elevation: 455 m (1,493 ft)

Population (Dec. 2016)
  - Total: 3,340
  - Density: 130/km^{2} (338/sq mi)
- Demonym: Villafratesi
- Time zone: UTC+1 (CET)
  - Summer (DST): UTC+2 (CEST)
- Postal code: 90030
- Dialing code: 091
- Website: Official website

Villafrati is a comune (municipality) in the Metropolitan City of Palermo in the Italian region Sicily, located about 25 kilometres (16 mi) southeast of Palermo. As of 31 December 2016, it had a population of 3,340 and an area of 25.6 square kilometres (9.9 mi^{2}).

Villafrati borders the following municipalities: Baucina, Bolognetta, Cefalà Diana, Ciminna, Marineo, Mezzojuso.

== Demographic evolution ==
Historical population

Year	Pop.	±%
1861	2,617	—
1871	3,050	+16.5%
1881	3,149	+3.2%
1901	3,245	+3.0%
1911	3,219	−0.8%

Year	Pop.	±%
1921	3,149	−2.2%
1931	2,930	−7.0%
1936	2,951	+0.7%
1951	3,364	+14.0%
1961	3,101	−7.8%

Year	Pop.	±%
1971	2,717	−12.4%
1981	3,184	+17.2%
1991	3,404	+6.9%
2001	3,365	−1.1%

Source: Data from ISTAT
