= Mezzojuso =

Council in Sicily, Italy

- Comune
- Comune di Mezzojuso
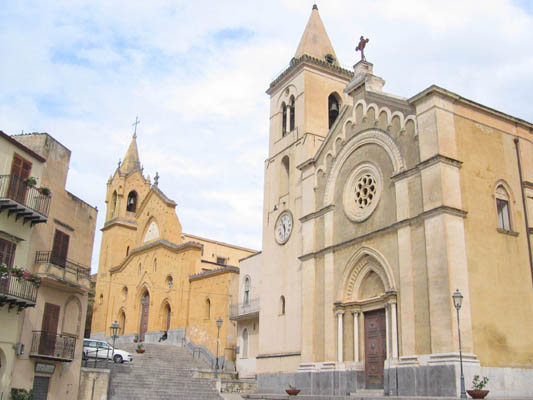
- Church of San Nicolò di Mira, Mezzojuso

- Location within Italy Location within Sicily
- Coordinates: 37°52′N 13°28′E
- Country: Italy
- Region: Sicily
- Metropolitan city: Palermo (PA)

Area
  - Total: 49.4 km^{2} (19.1 sq mi)

Population (Dec. 2004)
  - Total: 3,002
  - Density: 60.8/km^{2} (157/sq mi)
- Time zone: UTC+1 (CET)
  - Summer (DST): UTC+2 (CEST)
- Postal code: 90030
- Dialing code: 091

Mezzojuso (Sicilian: Menzijusu or Menziuso, Arbëreshë: Munxifsi) is a comune (municipality) in the Metropolitan City of Palermo in the Italian region Sicily, located about 45 kilometres (28 mi) southeast of Palermo. As of 31 December 2004, it had a population of 3,003 and an area of 49.4 square kilometres (19.1 mi^{2}).

Mezzojuso borders the following municipalities: Campofelice di Fitalia, Cefalà Diana, Ciminna, Godrano, Marineo, Villafrati.

== History ==
Mezzojuso means in Arabic: “Manzil Yusuf” (منزل يوسف) which translates in English to “Houses or 'hamlet' of Joseph.

A small Saracen (Arab) settlement from about A.D. 10th Century, passed into Norman hands in 1091. Then the Christian population erected the small church of S. Maria delle Grazie. The town and all the neighboring area was granted by the Norman king Roger (Ruggerio) II, to the Monastery of Saint John the Hermit, of Palermo in 1132. The village was nearly depopulated in the early 15th century. The Monastery of Saint John granted settlement to 48 families of Albanian soldiers, under the command of Demetrius Reres.

The first Albanians who settled there were the said Reres with his two sons, leading three battalions of soldiers. King Alfonso of Aragon permitted him to settle in the area and appointed D. Reres as a governor, with a decree of 1 September 1448. Reres and his units had already served Alfonso and helped him to conquer Calabria, as Alfonso recognizes.

The first settlers from the Balkans found the local church of Santa Maria delle Grazie ruined and soon rebuilt it. With a contract of 1501 with the Palermo religious authorities, they undertook the restoration of the church, the donation of olive oil and wax and everything needed for the rituals that had to be executed according to the Byzantine rite by priests. The community increased in population and by 1529 they established a fraternity.

The Reres family was one of the biggest in the community. Till the early 17th century, 11 persons with this name are noted in the archives. Apart from the aforementioned Demetrios, there were also Georgios and Basileios Reres (sons of Demetrios), Theodoros (in 1605 was captain of 452 stratioti (in Sicilian: "greci military albanesi") in Mezzojuso, Loukas and Andreas, sons of Theodoros (officers, too), Agnes Rere (mother of Andreas), Andreas (the benefactor of the churches), Lucina (Andeas' wife) and Georgios (Latin Catholic priest).
In 1601, the administrator was an Andrea Reres, a descendant of Demetrius Reres.

A. Reres died in 1609 and was buried in the church of S. Maria delle Grazie. A Latin and Greek inscription of 1752 in the church commemorates his name and the restoration works. In 1609, a Basilian monastery was founded by Reres with the provision that the Greek rite would be used.

In 1630, as there were no Basilian Albanian monks, eight monks from Crete were brought, causing the reaction of the local Italian nobility, which accused them of schismatics and false monks. The monastery was abandoned by the mid-19th century.

== Local life ==
The most significant local event happens before Easter, with the "Mastru Campu" ("maestro di campo" in Italian) which takes place on the last Sunday of Carnival, just before the start of Lent.

Reflecting the town's mixed ethnoreligious heritage, Mezzojuso is home to two historic Catholic mother churches both dating to the 16th century: the Latin-rite parish Church of Maria Santissima Annunziata and the Byzantine Greek-rite parish Church of San Nicolò di Mira.

The municipality's economy is based mainly on the cultivation of traditional crops like hard wheat, sulla, and extra virgin olive oil, which is produced from old and new olives, and on the breeding of sheep, cattle and goats.

== Demographic evolution ==
Historical population

Year	Pop.	±%
1861	5,092	—
1871	6,024	+18.3%
1881	6,452	+7.1%
1901	5,038	−21.9%
1911	7,212	+43.2%

Year	Pop.	±%
1921	5,294	−26.6%
1931	4,317	−18.5%
1936	4,469	+3.5%
1951	4,938	+10.5%
1961	4,565	−7.6%

Year	Pop.	±%
1971	3,464	−24.1%
1981	3,127	−9.7%
1991	3,213	+2.8%
2001	3,058	−4.8%

Source: Data from ISTAT

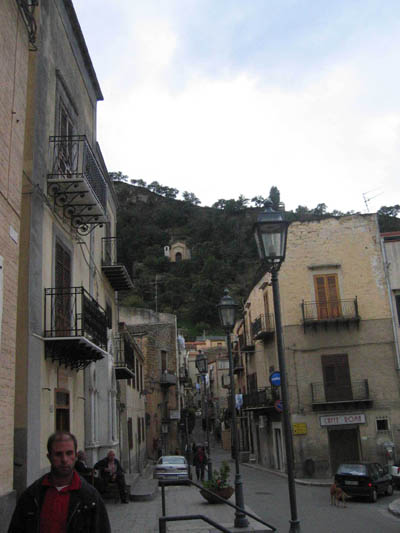

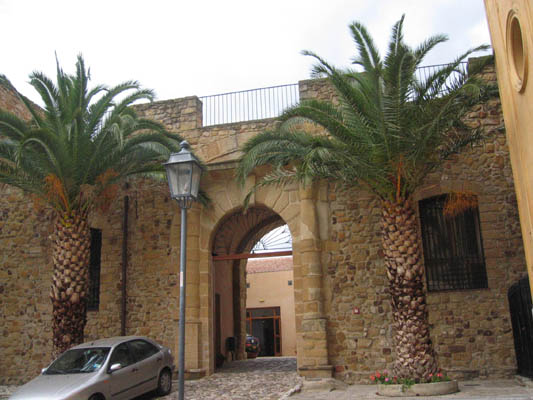

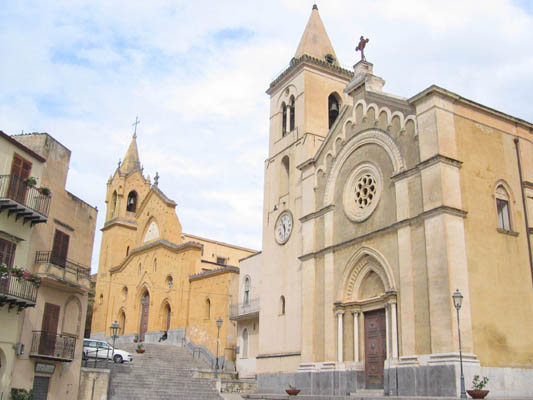

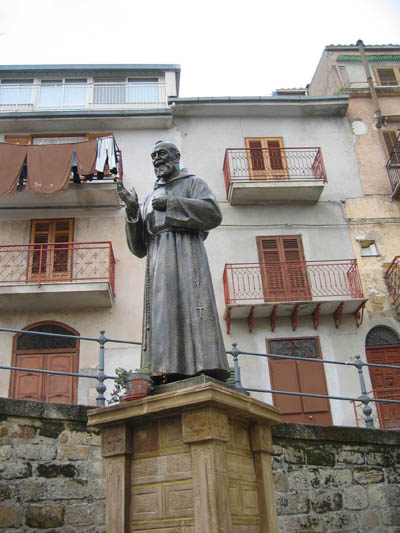

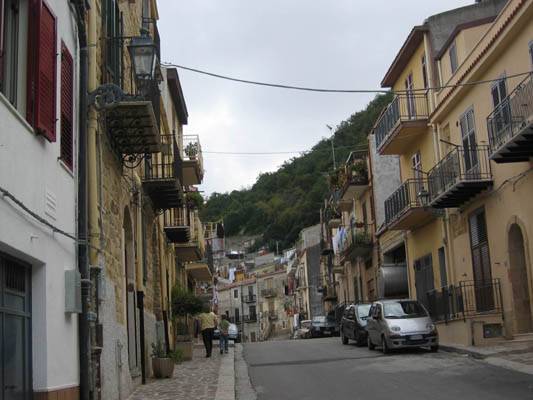

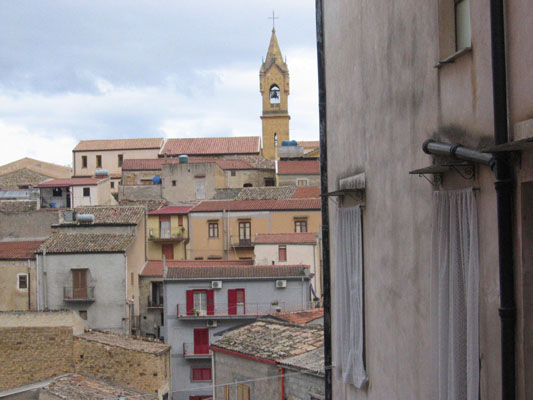

== Notable people ==
- Nicola Figlia, folklorist and translator

== Bibliography ==
- Buccola Onofrio (1909) La Colonia Greco-Albanese di Mezzojuso: origine, vicende e progresso.
- Buccola Onofrio (1912) Nuove recerche sulla fondazione della Colonia Greco-Albanese di Mezzojuso.
- Buccola Onofrio (1914) Mezzojuso e la Chiesa di Santa Maria: nuovi documenti storici.
- Siderides S.A. (1928) The epirotic family of Rere (Η Ηπειρωτίς οικογένεια Ρερέ), Epirotica Chronica (Ηπειρωτικά Χρονικά), vol.3, pp. 160–168. In Greek language.
