= Prizzi Lake =

Lake in Sicily, Italy

Lago Prizzi
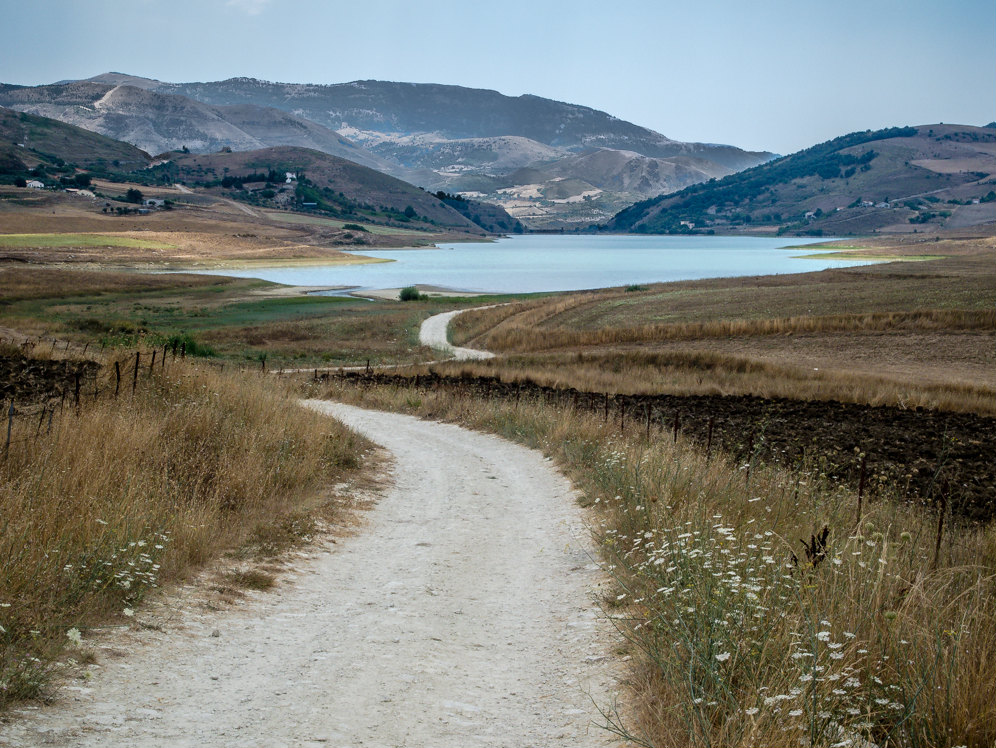

- Location within Sicily
- Location: Province of Palermo, Sicily
- Coordinates: 37.729317°N 13.407011°E
- Primary inflows: Fiume Belice
- Catchment area: 30 km^{2} (12 sq mi)
- Basin countries: Italy
- Surface area: 0.9 km^{2} (0.35 sq mi)
- Average depth: 10.3 m (34 ft)
- Max. depth: 45.5 m (149 ft)
- Water volume: 9,300,000 m^{3} (330,000,000 cu ft)
- Residence time: 1.9 years
- Surface elevation: 640 m (2,100 ft)

Lago Prizzi is a lake in the Province of Palermo, Sicily, Italy, close to Prizzi. It was constructed in the early 1940s for hydroelectricity and irrigation. At an elevation of 640 m, its surface area is 0.9 km² and it has an average depth of 10.3 m.
