= Bolognetta =

Bolognetta Bulugnetta (Sicilian)
- Comune
- Comune di Bolognetta
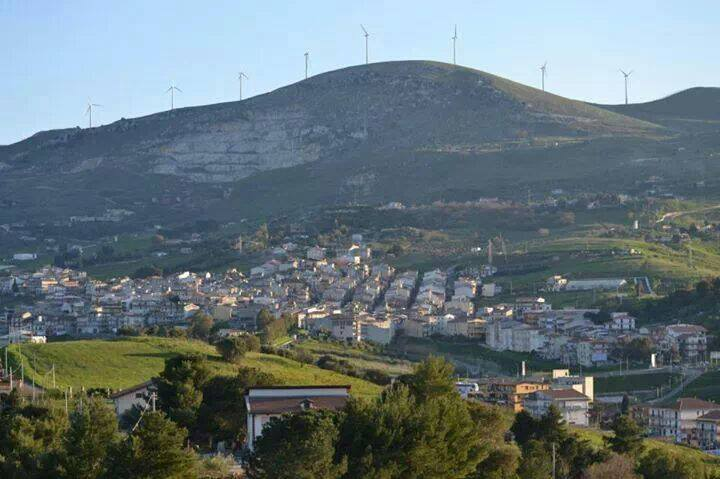

- Location within Italy Location within Sicily
- Coordinates: 37°58′N 13°27′E
- Country: Italy
- Region: Sicily
- Metropolitan city: Palermo (PA)

Government
  - Mayor: Gaetano Grassadonia

Area
  - Total: 27.63 km^{2} (10.67 sq mi)
- Elevation: 300 m (980 ft)

Population (30 April 2017)
  - Total: 4,159
  - Density: 150.5/km^{2} (389.9/sq mi)
- Demonym: Bolognettesi
- Time zone: UTC+1 (CET)
  - Summer (DST): UTC+2 (CEST)
- Postal code: 90030
- Dialing code: 091
- Patron saint: St. Anthony of Padua
- Saint day: 13 June
- Website: Official website

Bolognetta (Sicilian: Bulugnetta) is a comune (municipality) in the Metropolitan City of Palermo in the Italian region Sicily, located about 20 kilometres (12 mi) southeast of Palermo.

In the 17th century Bolognetta was a fief of the Mancini family with the name of Ogliastro.

Bolognetta borders the following municipalities: Baucina, Casteldaccia, Marineo, Misilmeri, Ventimiglia di Sicilia, Villafrati.
