= Salvatore Cardella =

Italian architect (1896–1973)

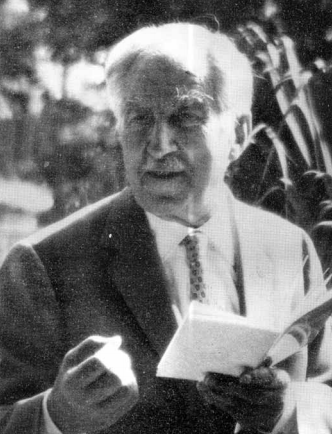
- Born: 24 June 1896; Caltanissetta, Kingdom of Italy
- Died: 15 September 1973 (aged 77); Palermo, Italy
- Education: University of Palermo
- Occupation: Architect

Salvatore Cardella (24 June 1896 – 15 September 1973) was an Italian architect associated with modern architecture in Sicily. He graduated from the University of Palermo in 1918 and was a pupil of Ernesto Basile. Cardella designed several public and religious buildings in Sicily during from the 1920s to the 1960s.

== Selected works ==
Notable works by Cardella include:

- Martorana Tomb, Casteldaccia (1928)
- Casa Castro, Palermo (1950)
- Town Hall, Gela (1950–1952)
- Church of San Giacomo Maggiore, Gela (1949–1952)
- Former Provincial Building of Studies, Caltanissetta (1950―1966)
- Engeenering Department Building, Caltanissetta (1951–1953)
- Monumental entrance to Villa Garibaldi, Gela (1956–1958)
- Banco di Sicilia–INA Building, Enna (1958–1959)
- State Archives of Caltanissetta (1958–1969, completed in 1981)

== Sources ==
- Iannello, Matteo; Scolaro, Glenda. Palermo. Guida all'architettura del '900. Palermo: 2009.
- Maggio, Francesco (2005). La casa-studio di Salvatore Cardella, ridisegno e analisi grafica (PDF). Palermo: Grafill.
- Sessa, Ettore (2014). "Salvatore Cardella e il Futurismo in Sicilia". Il Manifesto dell'architettura futurista di Sant'Elia e la sua eredità. Mantua: Universitas Studiorum. pp. 137–158.
- Tuzzolino, Francesco G. (2001). Cardella, Pollini. Architettura e didattica. Palermo: L'Epos.
