= Amato (surname) =

Amato is a family name of Italian origin, meaning "beloved" or "dear one". Notable people with the surname include:

- Angelo Amato (1938–2024), Roman Catholic titular archbishop
- Bert Amato (21st century), American inventor
- Chuck Amato (born 1946), American football coach
- Dave Amato (born 1953), American guitarist
- Donna Amato (living), American pianist
- Erika Amato (born 1969), American singer and actress
- Frank Amato (disappeared 1980, pronounced legally dead 1985), Sicilian-American mafioso
- Gabriel Amato (born 1970), former Argentine footballer
- Gerardo Amato (born 1952), Italian actor
- Giovanni Amato (1875–1959), Italian businessperson
- Giovanni Antonio Amato (1475–1555), Italian painter
- Giuliano Amato (born 1938), Italian politician
- Grant Amato (born 1989), American murderer
- Joe Amato (dragster driver) (born 1944), American dragster driver
- Joe Amato (poet) (born 1955) American writer and poet
- Joseph Amato (mobster) (died 1927), Italian-American mobster
- Joseph A. Amato (1938–2025), American author and scholar
- Ken Amato (born 1977), Puerto Rican American football player
- Kimberly Amato (born 1976), American actress
- Lou Amato (born 1963), Australian politician
- Mario Amato (1938–1980), Italian magistrate
- Michelle Amato (21st century), American vocalist
- Nancy M. Amato, American computer scientist
- Pasquale Amato (1878–1942), Italian operatic baritone singer
- Phil Amato, American politician
- Pietro Amato (21st century), Canadian jazz horn player
- Raffaele Amato (1965), Italian Camorra boss
- Sara Amato (born 1980), American professional wrestler better known as Sara Del Rey
- Serena Amato (born 1974), Argentine sailboat racer
- Silvio Amato (born 1961), Italian composer of classical, contemporary and popular music
- Stacey Pheffer Amato (born 1966), American politician
- Vincenzo Amato (disambiguation), multiple people
