= Vincenzo Amato (disambiguation) =

Vincenzo Amato may refer to:

- Vincenzo Amato (born 1966), Italian actor and sculptor
- Vincenzo Amato (composer) (1629–1670), Italian composer
- Vincenzo Amato (mathematician) (1881–1963), Italian mathematician
