= Campofelice =

Campofelice may refer to:

- Campofelice di Fitalia, a municipality in the Metropolitan City of Palermo in the Italian region Sicily, Italy
- Campofelice di Roccella, a municipality in the Metropolitan City of Palermo in the Italian region of Sicily, Italy

== See also ==
- Campo Felice, a karstic plateau in the central Apennines, Italy
