= Marineo =

- Comune
- Comune di Marineo
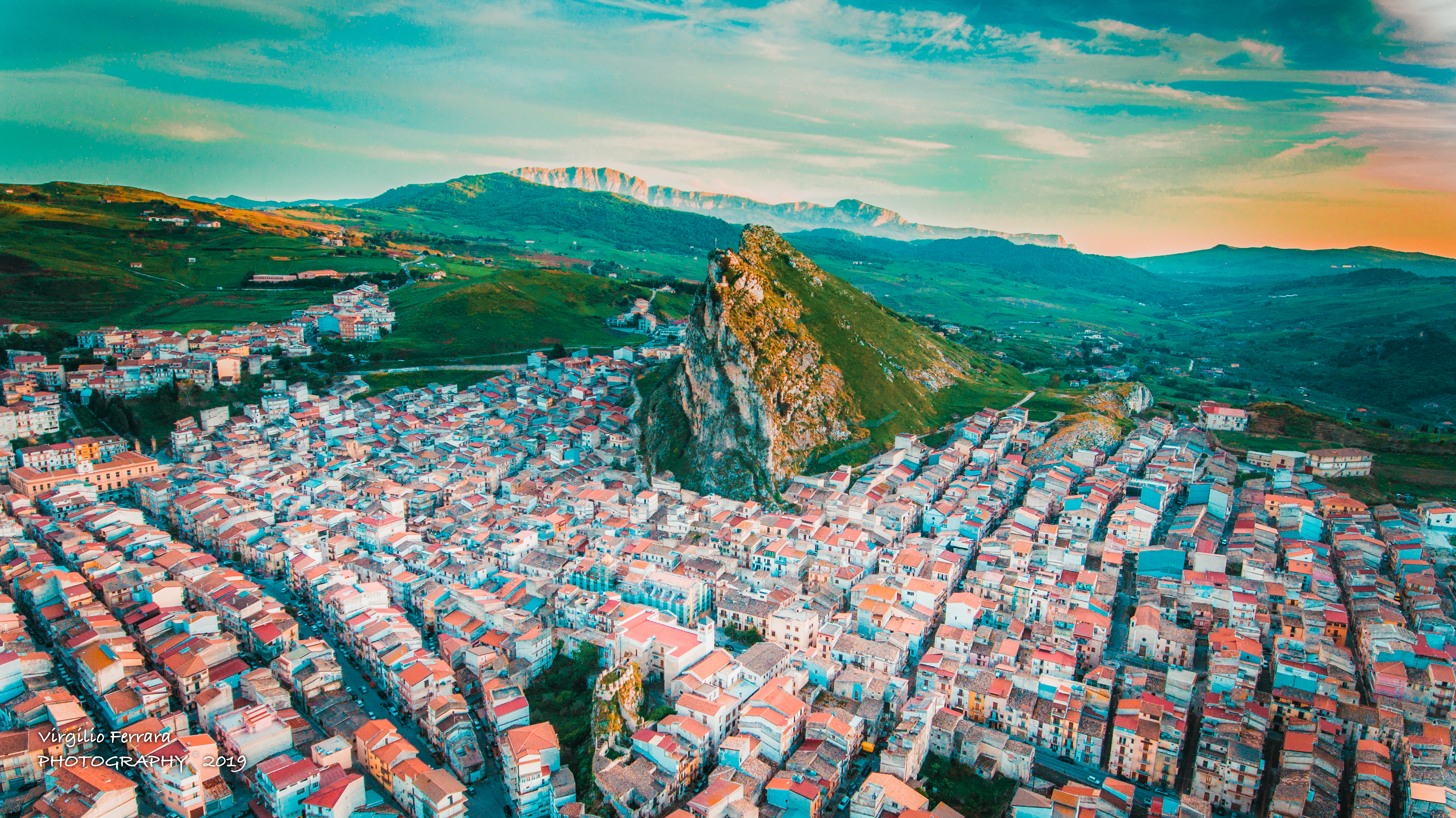
- Aerial view of Marineo, facing the Rock of Marineo which is in the southwest of the town

- Marineo within the Province of Palermo

- Location within Italy Location within Sicily
- Coordinates: 37°57′N 13°25′E
- Country: Italy
- Region: Sicily
- Metropolitan city: Palermo (PA)

Area
  - Total: 33.3 km^{2} (12.9 sq mi)
- Elevation: 550 m (1,800 ft)

Population (Dec. 2004)
  - Total: 6,885
  - Density: 207/km^{2} (535/sq mi)
- Demonym: Marinesi
- Time zone: UTC+1 (CET)
  - Summer (DST): UTC+2 (CEST)
- Postal code: 90035
- Dialing code: 091

Marineo (Sicilian: Marineu) is a comune (municipality) in the Metropolitan City of Palermo in the Italian region Sicily, located about 20 kilometres (12 mi) south of Palermo. As of 31 December 2004, it had a population of 6,885 and an area of 33.3 square kilometres (12.9 mi^{2}).

== Geography ==
Marineo borders the following municipalities: Bolognetta, Cefalà Diana, Godrano, Mezzojuso, Misilmeri, Monreale, Santa Cristina Gela and Villafrati.

== History ==
During the Fasci Siciliani uprising, 18 people were killed in a massacre in Marineo on January 2, 1894, including 5 children aged 2 and under as well as 13 adults. A plaque in Marineo commemorates the massacre, which was part of a wave of violence followed the Giardinello massacre twenty-two days prior.

== Demographics ==
Historical population

| Year | Pop. | ±% |
|---|---|---|
| 1861 | 8,483 | — |
| 1871 | 8,992 | +6.0% |
| 1881 | 9,673 | +7.6% |
| 1901 | 10,551 | +9.1% |
| 1911 | 8,089 | −23.3% |

| Year | Pop. | ±% |
|---|---|---|
| 1921 | 7,375 | −8.8% |
| 1931 | 6,512 | −11.7% |
| 1936 | 6,676 | +2.5% |
| 1951 | 7,291 | +9.2% |
| 1961 | 7,342 | +0.7% |

| Year | Pop. | ±% |
|---|---|---|
| 1971 | 6,537 | −11.0% |
| 1981 | 6,246 | −4.5% |
| 1991 | 6,654 | +6.5% |
| 2001 | 6,956 | +4.5% |

Source: Data from ISTAT

== Main sights ==
The town of Marineo lies in the Eleuterio river valley, at the foot of an imposing cliff known as the Rock of Marineo, just outside the Ficuzza wood.

Although it is an inland town, its name likely derives from Latin marinus ("marine"). Due to its topographic prominence, it is one of the first points where travelers heading northward from Agrigento can see the Tyrrhenian Sea in the distance.

The 17th century Mother church of San Ciro (featuring an outstanding shrine containing the remains of the patron saint, Saint Cyrus of Alexandria), the Madonna Dajna Sanctuary (1583) and the remains of the Castle. The Archeological Museum contains findings from the Eleuterio valley. Going further down the Scanzano valley, and move along the edge of the Cappelliere wood and the shore of the Scanzano artificial lake, all the way to the natural ramparts of Rocca Busambra, rising out of a vast oak wood.

== Culture ==
Major events include the Dimostranza di San Ciro, a folk pantomime taking place every four years in August, and the Cunnutta, a parade of pious people on horseback to celebrate the patron saint. In September, an important international poetry contest takes place.

== Gallery ==
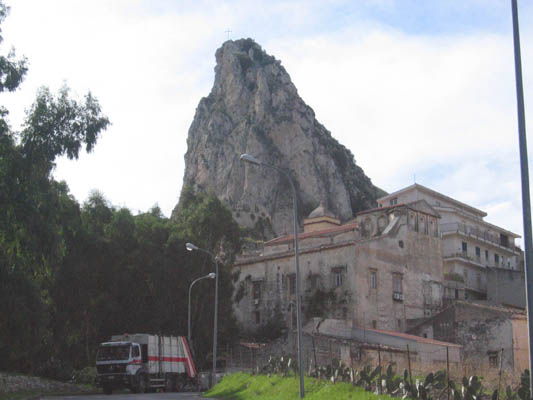
Rock of Marineo seen from the town

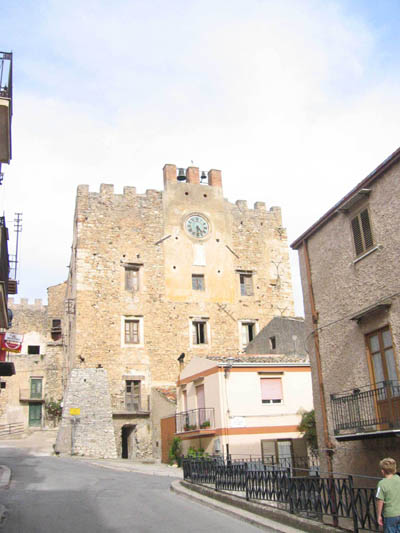

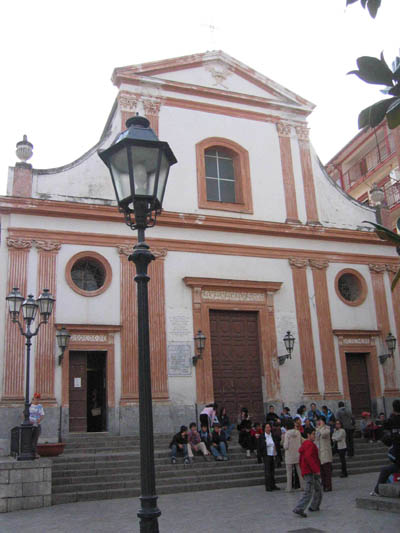

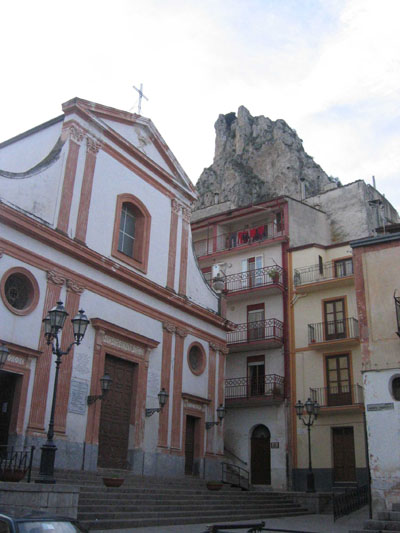

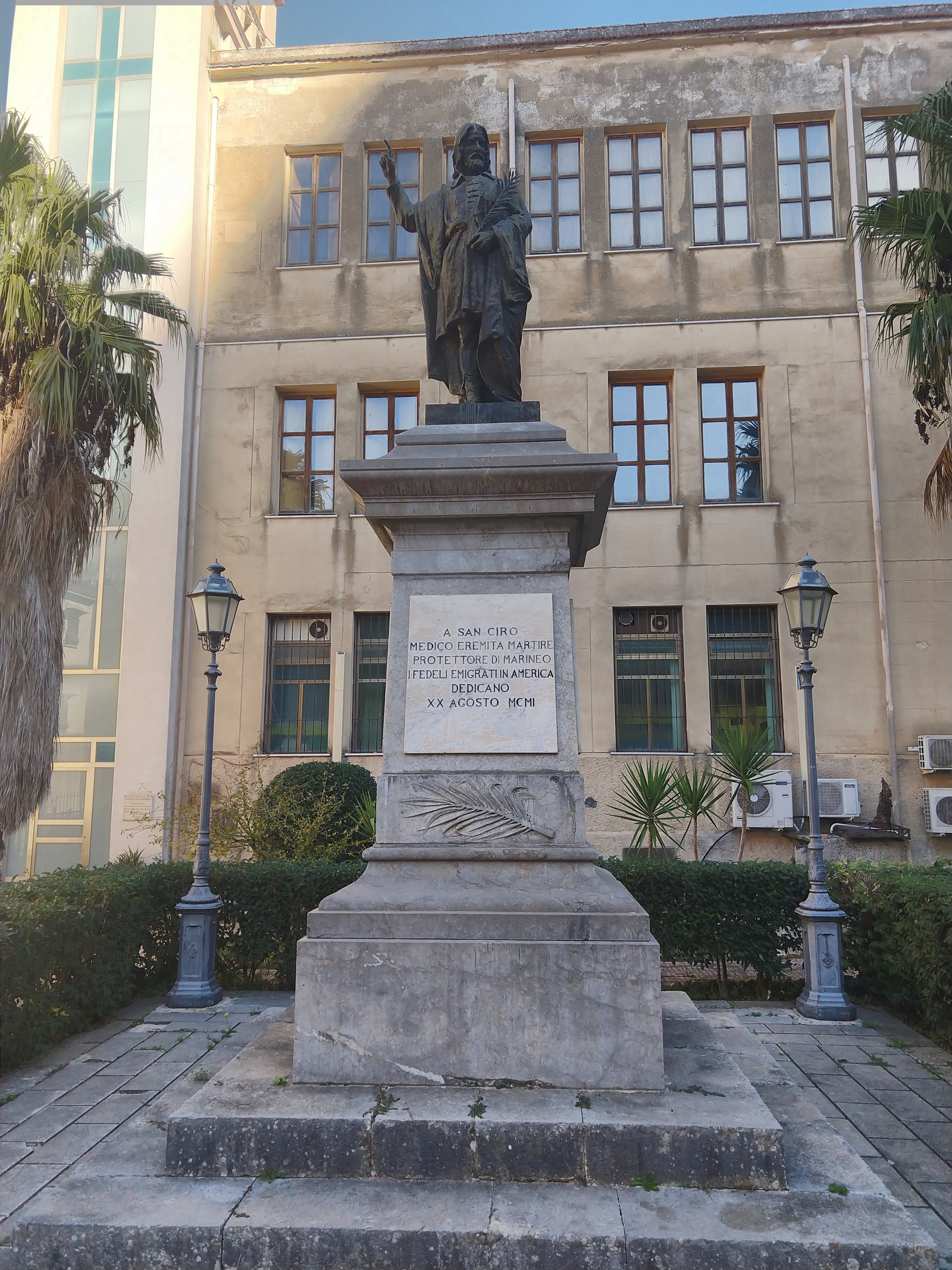
Statue of Saint Ciro in front of the eponymous church
