= State Archives of Caltanissetta =

State archival institution in Caltanissetta, Italy

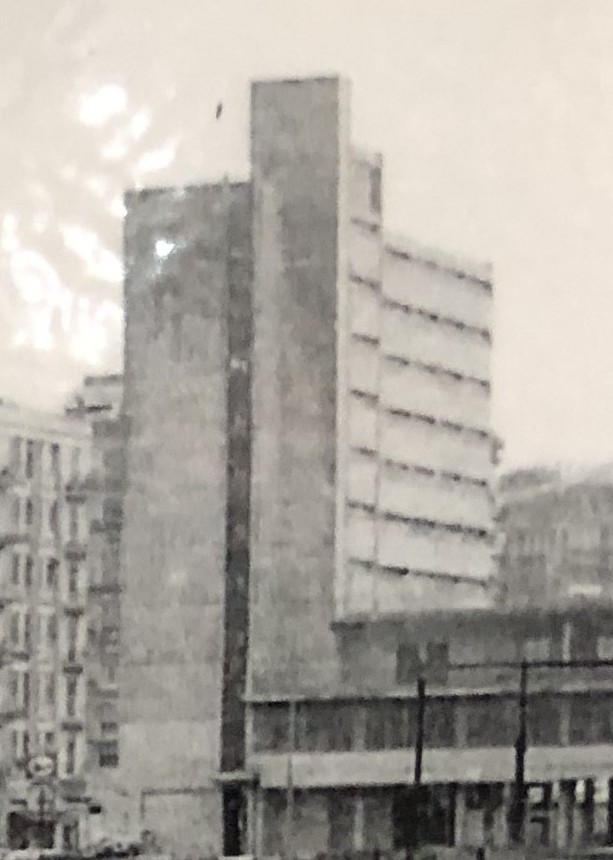
- Interactive map of State Archives of Caltanissetta
- 37°29′38″N 14°02′45″E
- Location: Caltanissetta, Sicily, Italy
- Type: State archive

Building information
- Architect: Salvatore Cardella
- Construction date: 1969–1981
- Website: https://ascaltanissetta.cultura.gov.it/home

The State Archives of Caltanissetta (Italian: Archivio di Stato di Caltanissetta) is a public archival institution located in Caltanissetta, Italy. It preserves historical records produced by governmental and administrative institutions that operated in the province of Caltanissetta and forms part of the national archival network administered by the Italian Ministry of Culture.

The archive preserves documentation relating to the historical institutions of the territory, including records from the administrations of the Kingdom of Sicily and the Kingdom of the Two Sicilies, as well as those produced by the local offices of the Kingdom of Italy and the Italian Republic. It also holds records from courts, state offices, and other public institutions active in the province.

It was founded in 1843 as a provincial archive. It later became a Provincial State Archive in 1932, was classified as a Section of the State Archives in 1939, and obtained its designation of State Archives on 30 September 1963. Until 1951 it also preserved records relating to the province of Enna.

The archive is housed in a purpose-built structure planned in 1958 by the architect Salvatore Cardella in a newly developing administrative district of Caltanissetta near the Courthouse. Construction began in 1969 and the building was inaugurated in 1981. Designed according to modern archival standards, the complex combines a vertical tower used for document storage with a lower horizontal block containing offices and reading rooms, characterized by the extensive use of reinforced concrete.
