= Comiciana =

Ancient town in Sicily

Comiciana was an ancient town of Sicily located on the southern side of Maro Mons, between Agrigentum (modern Agrigento) and Ancyra. Its precise location remains uncertain, the editors of the Barrington Atlas of the Greek and Roman World place it near Prizzi.
