= Pasquale Sarullo =

Italian painter

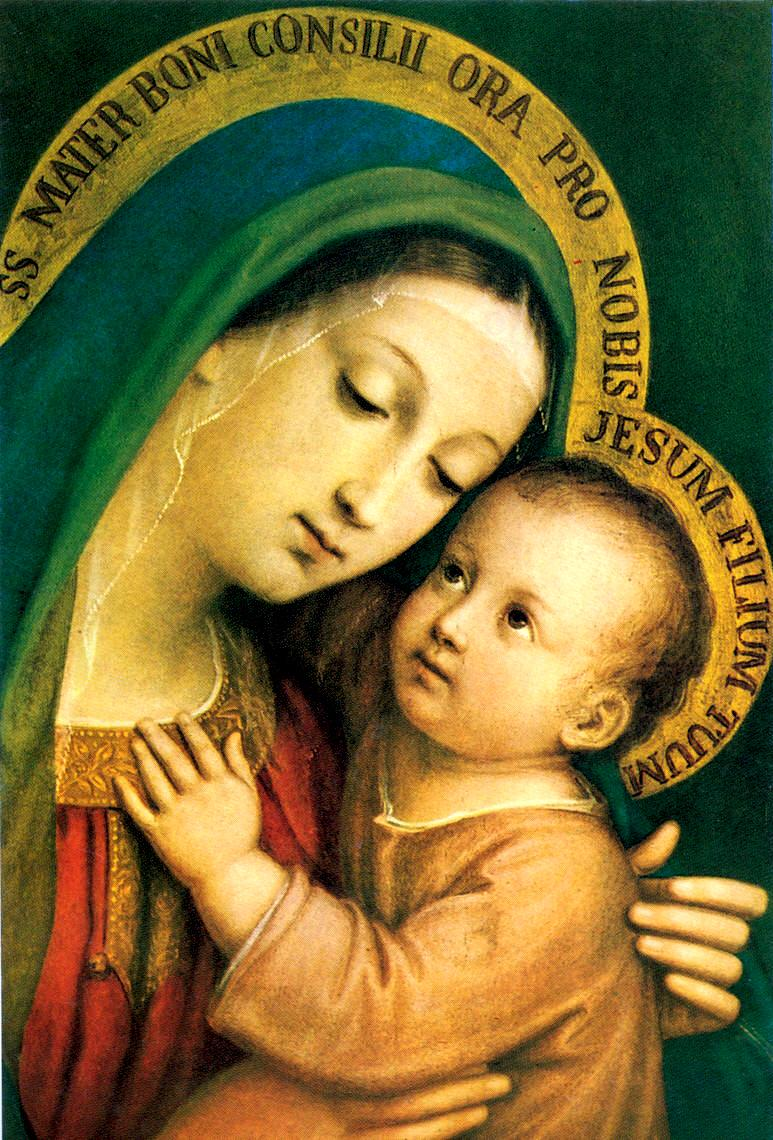
Our Lady of Good Counsel by Pasquale Sarullo, 19th century.

Pasquale Sarullo was a 19th-century Franciscan friar, priest and artist. A native of Ciminna, in the province of Palermo, Italy, his work was appreciated by his contemporaries and had an international circulation.
