= Nicola Figlia =

Arbëreshë Byzantine rite priest, and writer

Nicola Figlia (1691–1769) was an Arbëreshë Byzantine rite priest, and writer of the 18th century, who is known for his translations of biblical fragments into Arbëresh for children, as well as an Arbëreshë folklorist. The Figlia (Filja) family is a known Arbëreshë one from Mezzojuso in Sicily, who were originally settlers from Filati in Chameria, today's northern Greece.
