= Cefalà Diana =

Cefalà Diana Kefaládes (Greek)
- Comune
- Comune di Cefalà Diana
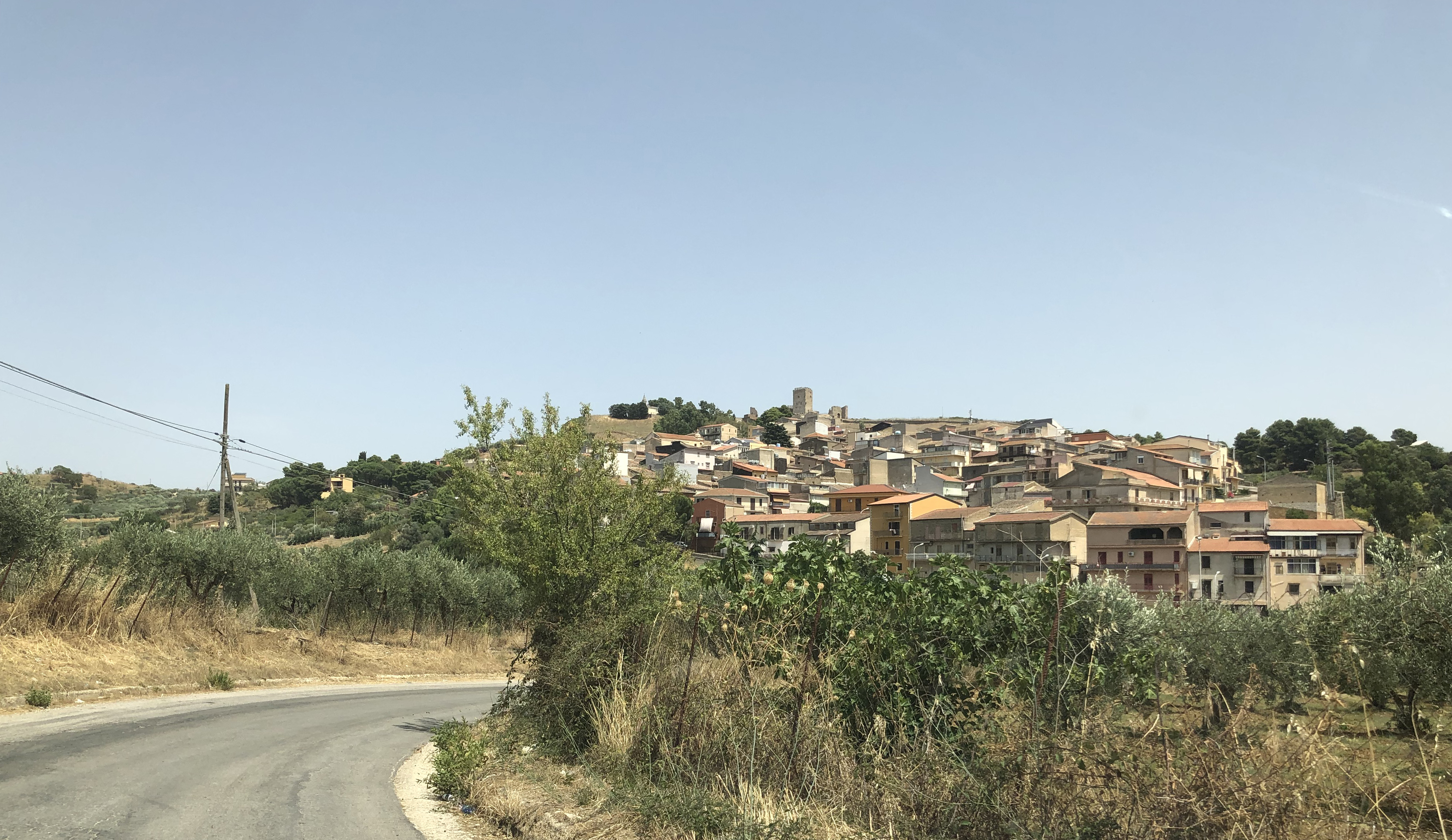

- Location within Italy Location within Sicily
- Coordinates: 37°55′N 13°28′E
- Country: Italy
- Region: Sicily
- Metropolitan city: Palermo (PA)

Area
  - Total: 9.0 km^{2} (3.5 sq mi)

Population (2015)
  - Total: 1,005
  - Density: 110/km^{2} (290/sq mi)
- Time zone: UTC+1 (CET)
  - Summer (DST): UTC+2 (CEST)
- Postal code: 90030
- Dialing code: 091

Cefalà Diana (Sicilian: Cifalà Diana) is a comune (municipality) in the Metropolitan City of Palermo in the Italian region Sicily, located about 25 kilometres (16 mi) southeast of Palermo. As of 2015, it had a population of 1,005 and an area of 9.0 square kilometres (3.5 mi^{2}).

Cefalà Diana borders the following municipalities: Marineo, Mezzojuso, Villafrati.

== Demographic evolution ==
Historical population

Year	Pop.	±%
1861	787	—
1871	906	+15.1%
1881	1,151	+27.0%
1901	1,187	+3.1%
1911	1,279	+7.8%

Year	Pop.	±%
1921	1,082	−15.4%
1931	1,090	+0.7%
1936	1,145	+5.0%
1951	1,191	+4.0%
1961	1,063	−10.7%

Year	Pop.	±%
1971	863	−18.8%
1981	897	+3.9%
1991	1,031	+14.9%
2001	992	−3.8%

Source: Data from ISTAT
