= Campofelice di Fitalia =

- Comune
- Comune di Campofelice di Fitalia
- Location within Italy Location within Sicily
- Coordinates: 37°50′N 13°29′E
- Country: Italy
- Region: Sicily
- Metropolitan city: Palermo (PA)

Area
  - Total: 35.2 km^{2} (13.6 sq mi)

Population (Dec. 2004)
  - Total: 595
  - Density: 16.9/km^{2} (43.8/sq mi)
- Time zone: UTC+1 (CET)
  - Summer (DST): UTC+2 (CEST)
- Postal code: 90030
- Dialing code: 091

Campofelice di Fitalia (Sicilian: Campufilici di Fitalia) is a comune (municipality) in the Metropolitan City of Palermo in the Italian region Sicily, located about 35 kilometres (22 mi) southeast of Palermo. As of 31 December 2004, it had a population of 595 and an area of 35.2 square kilometres (13.6 mi^{2}).

Campofelice di Fitalia borders the following municipalities: Ciminna, Corleone, Mezzojuso, Prizzi, Vicari.

== Famous people ==
- Mike Bongiorno

== Demographic evolution ==
Historical population

Year	Pop.	±%
1861	1,017	—
1871	1,203	+18.3%
1881	1,289	+7.1%
1901	1,181	−8.4%
1911	1,681	+42.3%

Year	Pop.	±%
1921	1,688	+0.4%
1931	1,439	−14.8%
1936	1,615	+12.2%
1951	1,550	−4.0%
1961	1,339	−13.6%

Year	Pop.	±%
1971	932	−30.4%
1981	751	−19.4%
1991	638	−15.0%
2001	609	−4.5%

Source: Data from ISTAT
