= Vincenzo Amato (composer) =

Italian composer (1629–1670)

Vincenzo Amato (5 January 1629, Ciminna near Palermo – 29 July 1670, Palermo), also D'Amato or Di Amato, was an Italian composer of the Baroque.

He was Maestro di Capella at the cathedral in Palermo. He was trained as a priest and later devoted himself to music. He published two volumes of sacred compositions (masses and motets) and the St Matthew Passion and the St John Passion.

== Works ==
- Sacri concerti a 2, 3, 4 e 5 voci, con una messa a 3 e a 4 voci. Libro I. Opera I. (1656)
- Messa e salmi di Vespro e Compieta a 4 e 5 voci. Libro I. Op. II. (1656)
- A St John and a St Matthew Passion, in parts still sung in Sicilian churches
