= Prizzi =

Prizzi Greek: Pyrízo
- Comune
- Comune di Prizzi
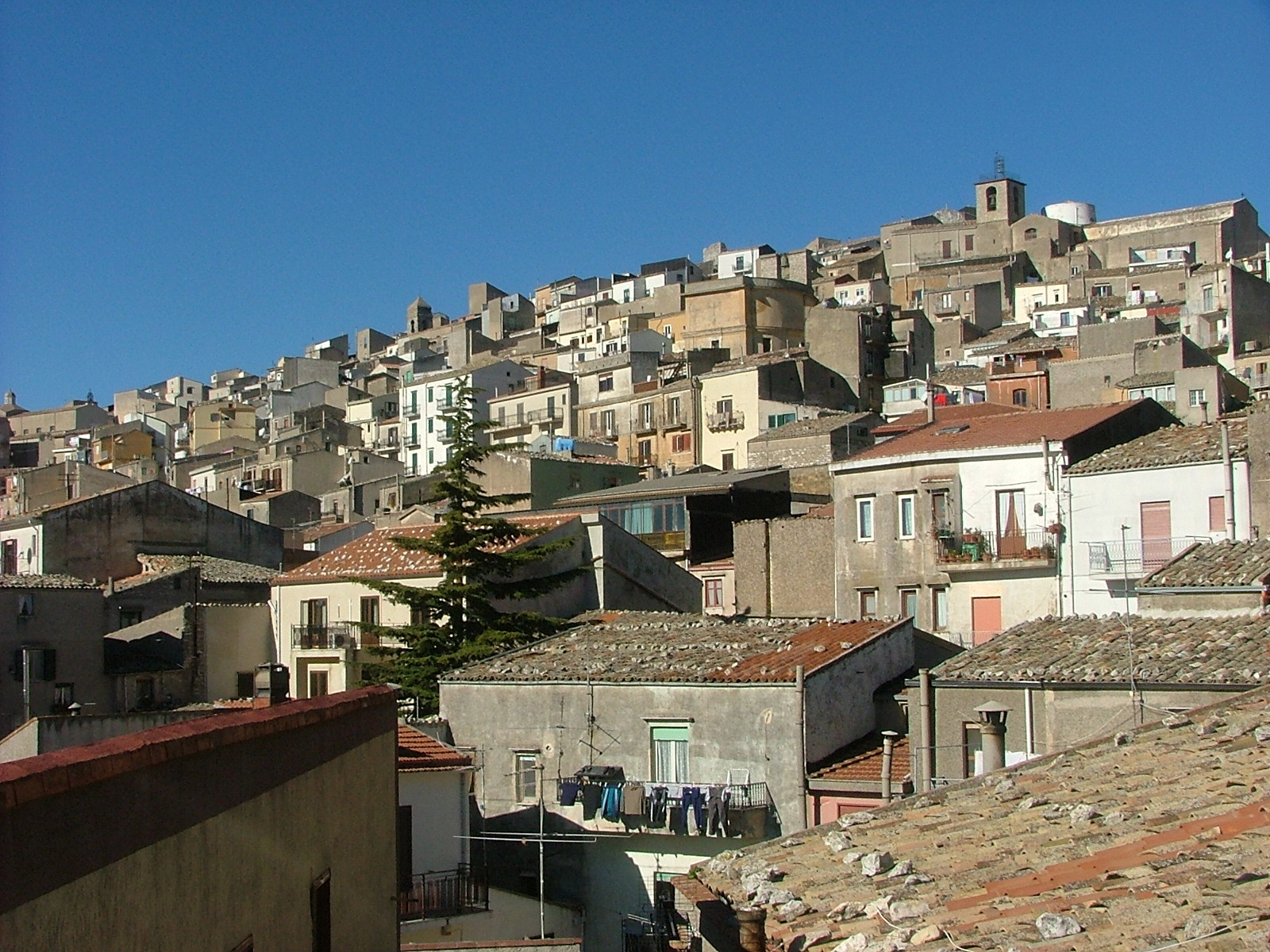

- Coat of arms

- Location within Italy Location within Sicily
- Coordinates: 37°43′N 13°26′E
- Country: Italy
- Region: Sicily
- Metropolitan city: Palermo (PA)
- Frazioni: Filaga

Government
  - Mayor: Comparetto Antonina

Area
  - Total: 95 km^{2} (37 sq mi)
- Elevation: 1,045 m (3,428 ft)

Population (31 December 2010)
  - Total: 5,152
  - Density: 54/km^{2} (140/sq mi)
- Demonym: Prizzesi
- Time zone: UTC+1 (CET)
  - Summer (DST): UTC+2 (CEST)
- Postal code: 90038
- Dialing code: 091
- Patron saint: St. George
- Saint day: 23 April
- Website: Official website

Prizzi is a town and comune of 5,711 inhabitants in the Italian Metropolitan City of Palermo, on the island of Sicily. It is located 84 km (52 mi) south of the city of Palermo at an altitude of 1045 m (3,428 ft) above sea level on a hill in the upper valley of the River Sosio. Prizzi is surrounded by the comuni of Campofelice di Fitalia, Castronovo di Sicilia, Lercara Friddi, Palazzo Adriano, Vicari, and the city of Corleone.

== History ==
Traces have been found of a small Elymian settlement, called Hippana or Hyppana, dating from the 8th-6th centuries BC on the nearby Montagna dei Cavalli. This settlement was later rebuilt in the 4th century BC, by Hiero I of Syracuse, and subsequently inhabited by Carthaginians, Greeks, Arabs, and Romans. Hippana has the highest altitude Greek theater known in Sicily. The ancient town of Comiciana was probably nearby. The town of Prizzi is thought to have been constructed by the refugees of a Roman invasion, but it is better documented to have at least pre-existed the Saracen invasion, when it was controlled by the Byzantines prior to the Arab conquest. The name Prizzi derives from the Greek Pyrizo, meaning "incendiary" as in the context of sending smoke signals, referring to its origin as an important point for fighting off enemy invaders in Sicily. The present town, of Norman origin, was a fief of Guglielmo Bonello. In 1150, it passed to the Cistercian Monastery of Sant'Angelo. Between the 13th and 15th centuries, control of the town was disputed by various lords until it finally fell to the Bonanno family, whose fief it was until 1812.

The town is known for its Easter celebration, U Ballu dei Diavoli, or, in Italian, Ballo dei Diavoli.

== Climate ==
Prizzi has a Hot-summer Mediterranean Climate, albeit tempered compared to surrounding regions due to its high altitude. Summers are warm (and dry), but noticeably cooler than lower altitudes, with an average high of 28 C (83 F), but heat waves can increase the temperature over 32 C. Winters are cool and wet (following the Mediterranean climate pattern), much colder and somewhat rainier than lower altitudes (Palermo, for example has an average temperature of 11 C and an average high of 15 C during the coldest month, over 6 C warmer than Prizzi) - it is possible to see snow on a yearly basis during winter, something that is far less common in lower altitudes.

Climate data for Prizzi (1991–2020)
| Month | Jan | Feb | Mar | Apr | May | Jun | Jul | Aug | Sep | Oct | Nov | Dec | Year |
|---|---|---|---|---|---|---|---|---|---|---|---|---|---|
| Mean daily maximum °C (°F) | 7.6 (45.7) | 7.9 (46.2) | 10.9 (51.6) | 14.3 (57.7) | 19.7 (67.5) | 25.1 (77.2) | 28.4 (83.1) | 28.5 (83.3) | 22.9 (73.2) | 18.6 (65.5) | 12.9 (55.2) | 8.7 (47.7) | 17.1 (62.8) |
| Daily mean °C (°F) | 5.1 (41.2) | 5.1 (41.2) | 7.4 (45.3) | 10.4 (50.7) | 15.2 (59.4) | 20.1 (68.2) | 22.9 (73.2) | 23.3 (73.9) | 18.6 (65.5) | 15.0 (59.0) | 10.1 (50.2) | 6.3 (43.3) | 13.3 (55.9) |
| Mean daily minimum °C (°F) | 2.6 (36.7) | 2.2 (36.0) | 4.0 (39.2) | 6.5 (43.7) | 10.7 (51.3) | 15.0 (59.0) | 17.4 (63.3) | 18.0 (64.4) | 14.3 (57.7) | 11.4 (52.5) | 7.3 (45.1) | 3.9 (39.0) | 9.4 (48.9) |
| Average precipitation mm (inches) | 98.8 (3.89) | 76.5 (3.01) | 80.3 (3.16) | 66.0 (2.60) | 37.8 (1.49) | 21.4 (0.84) | 16.0 (0.63) | 24.2 (0.95) | 77.9 (3.07) | 102.2 (4.02) | 107.5 (4.23) | 111.5 (4.39) | 820.1 (32.29) |
| Average precipitation days (≥ 1 mm) | 10.2 | 9.1 | 8.3 | 7.4 | 4.2 | 2.2 | 1.4 | 2.0 | 7.1 | 7.9 | 9.8 | 12.0 | 81.6 |
| Average relative humidity (%) | 77.7 | 74.5 | 69.8 | 64.2 | 59.1 | 52.2 | 51.9 | 53.6 | 66.5 | 70.1 | 75.8 | 78.9 | 66.2 |
| Average dew point °C (°F) | 0.7 (33.3) | −0.3 (31.5) | 0.4 (32.7) | 2.0 (35.6) | 4.3 (39.7) | 6.5 (43.7) | 9.7 (49.5) | 10.3 (50.5) | 10.3 (50.5) | 7.9 (46.2) | 4.3 (39.7) | 2.0 (35.6) | 4.8 (40.7) |
Source: NOAA, (Dew Point for 1981-2010)
