= Vincenzo Amato (mathematician) =

Italian mathematician

Vincenzo Amato (2 June 1881 in Taranto – 2 March 1963 in Catania) was an Italian mathematician.
