= Casteldaccia =

Casteldaccia Castiḍḍazzu (Sicilian)
- Comune
- Comune di Casteldaccia
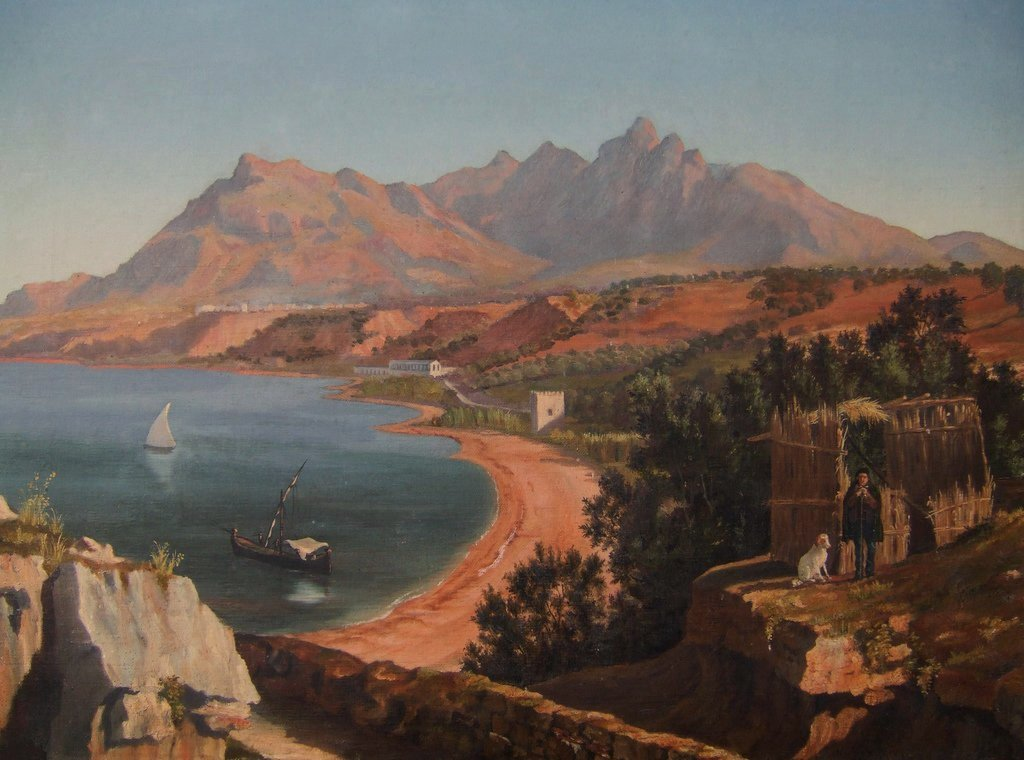
- An 1857 picture depiction of Casteldaccia.

- Coat of arms

- Location within Italy Location within Sicily
- Coordinates: 38°3′15″N 13°31′50″E
- Country: Italy
- Region: Sicily
- Metropolitan city: Palermo (PA)

Government
  - Mayor: Fabio Spatafora

Area
  - Total: 33.92 km^{2} (13.10 sq mi)
- Elevation: 79 m (259 ft)

Population (30 June 2017)
  - Total: 11,628
  - Density: 342.8/km^{2} (887.9/sq mi)
- Demonym: Casteldaccesi
- Time zone: UTC+1 (CET)
  - Summer (DST): UTC+2 (CEST)
- Postal code: 90014
- Dialing code: 091
- Patron saint: St. Joseph
- Website: Official website

Casteldaccia (Sicilian: Castiḍḍazzu) is a town of 11,628 inhabitants and comune near the Metropolitan City of Palermo, Sicily, southern Italy, founded by Marquis Longarini. It is the seat of the Vini Corvo wine producer, and the Tomasello Pasta factory.

== Origin of the name ==
One hypothesis on the origin of its name is that it comes from the union of two words: castello (Italian for "castle") and accia (celery, a plant that used to grow abundantly in the place where now the village stands).

== Architecture ==
The original town-planning is irregular, characterized by narrow streets and typical houses of the Sicilian tradition. The town center is constituted by the Matrice Square, surrounded by the town church, the façade of the castle of the Duke of Salaparuta, a symbol of the past feudal splendor, as well as a small chapel called La chiesetta.

In the late 20th century, Casteldaccia had a chaotic urban development: real estate speculation has irreparably damaged the territory. For example, the town has no public garden or a playground for children.

Casteldaccia's railway station belongs on the lines Palermo-Messina, Palermo-Agrigento and Palermo-Catania.

== Economy ==
The village has no large commercial activities. Most inhabitants commute to Bagheria and Palermo to carry out their work. Once most of the population was constituted by farmers. Currently agriculture hardly exists any longer, since most of farm lands were declared construable.

The fame of the town is mostly tied to the family of the Dukes of Salaparuta and in particular to Giuseppe Alliata Moncada who, in 1824, started to bottle a white wine produced with the Inzolia grapes coming from his property in Corvo di Salaparuta's district. The first seat of production was Alliata Moncada's Villa Valguarnera in the town of Bagheria, a few kilometres away from Casteldaccia. Thus the first bottled Sicilian wine was born, as well as the Sicilian wine-producing industry.

Other industries in town include the Tomasello pasta factory, and an olive oil company called Giada Oil which bottles and exports most of the oil produced in the town.

In the 16th century, the territory was intensely cultivated with sugarcane, so a tower called Bellacera was built to protect the plantations.

Casteldaccia is a resort area. In the summertime many citizens of Palermo move to some villas on the coast. Other villas, some of which in Art Nouveau style, surrounded by large gardens, are located on the hill overlooking the railway station.

== Notable people ==
- Vincenzo Colletta (1923–1991) – artist, Vince, as he came to be known after emigrating to the United States, became the most published artist in history. Although trained as a classical painter, he went on to become a fixture in the comic book world for 40 years. His work in the romance genre revolutionized comic book art, imparting a realism not seen before. During the latter part of his career, he became the go-to inker for both Marvel and DC Comics notably inking Thor and Wonder Woman among others.

== Sources ==
- Touristic brochure published by the former Province of Palermo.
- ASSO Informatica, The Italian Heritage, Casteldaccia, Touristic Information, 2009,
- Russo Rocco, Casteldaccia nella Storia della Sicilia: Memorie di ieri, Edizione Arti Grafiche Battaglie, Palermo, 1961, page 260.
- Sommariva Giulia, Bagarìa il territorio e le ville, Dario Flaccovio Editore, Palermo, 2009, pages 24–25.
