= Ciminna =

- Comune
- Comune di Ciminna
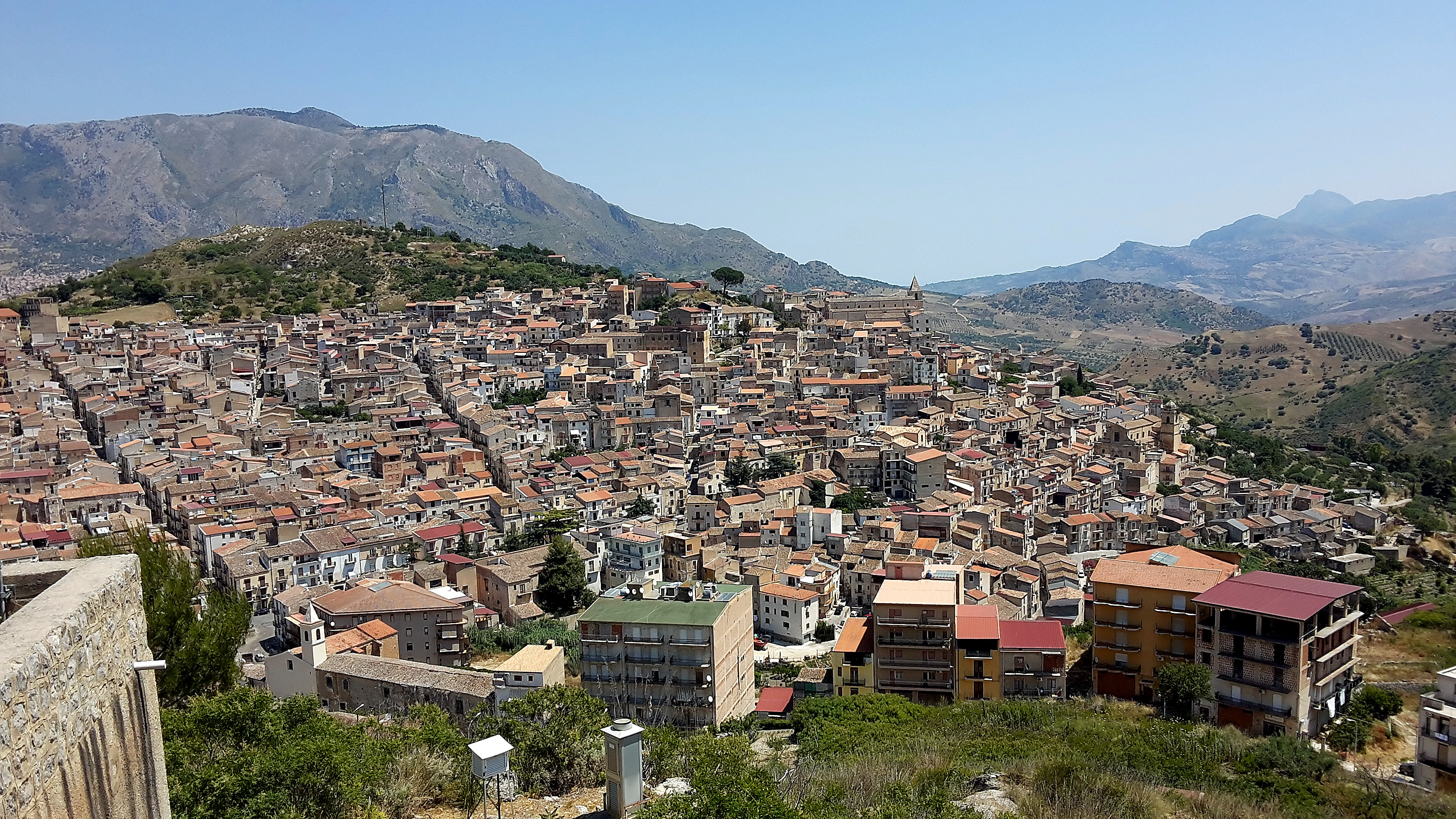

- Location within Italy Location within Sicily
- Coordinates: 37°54′N 13°34′E
- Country: Italy
- Region: Sicily
- Metropolitan city: Palermo (PA)

Area
  - Total: 56 km^{2} (22 sq mi)
- Elevation: 600 m (2,000 ft)

Population (2017)
  - Total: 3,697
  - Density: 66/km^{2} (170/sq mi)
- Demonym: Cimminesi
- Time zone: UTC+1 (CET)
  - Summer (DST): UTC+2 (CEST)
- Postal code: 90023
- Dialing code: 091
- Patron saint: St. Vito Martyr
- Saint day: First Sunday in September
- Website: Official website

Ciminna is a Sicilian city in the Metropolitan City of Palermo, located approximately 30 miles (48 km) southeast of its capital, Palermo. The city's economy is derived mainly from agriculture and traditional crafts.

== History ==
Its ancient history shows evidence of Punic and Roman settlements as well as Arab and Norman rule. There are Greek ruins overlooking the town which may be a temple to Demeter. The family of MLB player Anthony Rizzo was originally from Ciminna, as were the maternal grandparents of American director Martin Scorsese.

== Culture ==
The mountaintop city's vibrant culture is centered on its annual festivals and religious processions. These include the ancient La Festa del SS. Crocifisso (Feast of the Holy Crucifix), for one week culminating on the Sunday and Monday of the first weekend of May (held every year since 1651); and the Feast of San Vito, patron saint of the city, held in early September.

Other processions and festivals include the Feast of San Sebastian (January 20); Il Carnevale di Ciminna (Carnival similar to Mardi Gras); The Feast of San Giuseppe (St. Joseph, March 16–19); Riti della Passione: La Settimana Santa a Ciminna (The Rites of the Passion & Holy Week before Easter); U Prucettu d'ì Malati (April 19); the Feast of San Francesco di Paola (April 22–26) 2009; The Solemn Feast of the Body of God (Solennità del Corpus Domini (third week of May); The Feast of Mary of the Rosary (Maria SS. del Rosario, last Sunday of September); The Feast of the Immaculate Conception and the "Triumph" procession (Maria SS. Immacolata e "U Triunfu", Dec. 8 and the Saturday night following).

In 1963, Luchino Visconti chose Ciminna as the backdrop to the film The Leopard (Il Gattopardo, by Giuseppe Tomasi Di Lampedusa) which starred Burt Lancaster, Terence Hill, Alain Delon and Claudia Cardinale.

== Notable people ==
- Pasquale Sarullo (c. 19th century), artist and Franciscan priest
- Vincenzo Amato (1629-1670), composer, priest, and Maestro di Capella at the Palermo Cathedral
