= Bontade =

Bontade is a surname. Notable people with the surname include:

- Francesco Paolo Bontade (1914–1974), member of the Sicilian Mafia
- Giovanni Bontade (1946–1988), member of the Sicilian Mafia
- Margherita Bontade (1900–1992), Italian politician
- Stefano Bontade (1939–1981), member of the Sicilian Mafia
