= Un eroe borghese =

- Directed by: Michele Placido
- Written by: Graziano Diana; Angelo Pasquini
- Produced by: Pietro Valsecchi
- Starring: Michele Placido; Fabrizio Bentivoglio
- Cinematography: Luca Bigazzi
- Music by: Pino Donaggio
- Release date: 1995
- Country: Italy
- Language: Italian

Un eroe borghese (also known as Ordinary Hero and An Ordinary Hero) is a 1995 Italian historical drama film directed by Michele Placido. It is a dramatization of the downfall of the Michele Sindona's financial empire and of the subsequent Giorgio Ambrosoli's murder in 1979. The film won the David di Donatello for Best Producer and a special David di Donatello given to Placido for the "recognized narrative, artistic and civil value of his work".

== Plot ==
The film takes place in Milan in the seventies and tells the story of the lawyer Giorgio Ambrosoli and his investigations into the illicit financial activities of the Sicilian banker Michele Sindona, of whose banks he had been appointed liquidator. In 1974, the lawyer Giorgio Ambrosoli was appointed liquidator of the Italian Private Bank: forty, a fair, honest man in love with his wife Annalori and three children - Filippo, Francesca, Umberto - he got to work, while outside clients and depositors riot over their accounts. An indefatigable worker, Ambrosoli does not yet know in what tangle of mysteries he finds himself and what challenge he has taken on: the Bank, based in Milan, is in fact owned by the Sicilian Michele Sindona, an ultra-powerful financier. The "map" of the banks and companies it owns is very dense, in Italy and beyond the border.

Sindona has fled to New York and from the Hotel Pierre gives his orders: the mafia supports him and huge amounts of money come out of Italy, or re-enter in obscure money laundering operations, or spread like a metastasis in the great Sicilian empire, who has built close relationships not only with other financial men, but with politicians and industrialists. Ambrosoli is helped by Silvio Novembre, Marshal of the Guardia di Finanza, who from a collaborator becomes his friend, while the internal environment of the bank opposes the liquidator and the Bank of Italy itself does not seem to offer him all the necessary support. When wrongdoings, tortuous turns, bogus companies and documentation flaws are discovered for operations of enormous proportions, Sindona, furious, goes on the attack. There will be citations against Ambrosoli, telephone threats and various blandishments, but the lawyer does not yield: he presents his report, which is a real indictment, he refuses to change the conclusions, because - honest as' it is - it seems monstrous and intolerable to him that the State should intervene with payments at its own expense. Meanwhile, the names of politicians at the top are in circulation, such as corrupt or protectors of Sindona who has connections everywhere.

Ambrosoli's family life itself has become more than tiring: his wife is alarmed, the children no longer see their father, who luckily found an honest and tenacious collaborator in November. After being invited, in 1978, to testify before the New York Grand Jury, returning to Milan Ambrosoli now has behind him the deadly hatred of Sindona, whose judicial position in the United States is compromised. The mafia itself abandons the financier to his fate, who gives the order to eliminate the Milanese lawyer. Renewed telephone threats do not prevent Ambrosoli from fulfilling his task. Returning home one evening (by the way he has never been given an escort), while his family members are on Lake Como, Joseph Aricò, an Italian-American hitman, kills him with four revolver shots.

== Cast ==
- Michele Placido as Silvio Novembre
- Fabrizio Bentivoglio as Giorgio Ambrosoli
- Omero Antonutti as Michele Sindona
- Daan Hugaert as William Aricò
- Philippine Leroy-Beaulieu as Annalori Ambrosoli
- Laura Betti as Dr. Trebbi
- Ricky Tognazzi as Dr. Sarcinelli
- Giuliano Montaldo as Paolo Baffi

== See also ==
- List of Italian films of 1995
