= John Gambino =

Member of the Sicilian Mafia

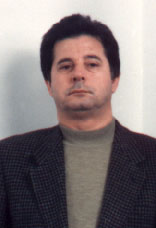
- Born: Giovanni Gambino; August 22, 1940; Palermo, Sicily, Italy
- Died: November 16, 2017 (aged 77); New York City, U.S.
- Occupation: Mobster
- Allegiance: Gambino crime family
- Convictions: Racketeering, drug trafficking (1994)
- Penalty: 15 years' imprisonment

Giovanni "John" Gambino (Italian: [dʒoˈvanni ɡamˈbiːno]; August 22, 1940 – November 16, 2017) was an Italian-born American mobster. Born in Palermo, Sicily, he became a made member of the Gambino crime family in 1975 and a capodecina or captain, and head of the crime family's Sicilian faction, appointed by family boss John Gotti in 1986, according to Mafia turncoat Sammy Gravano.

== Transatlantic Mafia clan ==
Together with his younger brothers Rosario (Sal) and Giuseppe (Joseph) he formed a faction in the crime family known as the Cherry Hill Gambinos for their base of operation in the New Jersey town of that name. Although they were distant cousins of family boss Carlo Gambino, they did not owe him allegiance. They were Sicilian Mafiosi, men from Palermo, whose father had brought the family to New York in 1964. The Gambino brothers ran the Cafe Valentino on 18th Avenue in Bensonhurst, Brooklyn (later renamed as Cafe Giardino).

The Gambinos hailed from the Passo di Rigano neighbourhood in Palermo, just as the Inzerillo clan, headed by Salvatore Inzerillo. Together the Inzerillo-Gambino Mafia clan formed a transatlantic Mafia family, based in Palermo and New York. The Inzerillo clan had been on the verge of total extermination by Totò Riina and the Corleonesi during the Second Mafia War in Sicily when in 1981 the family boss Salvatore Inzerillo was killed. With the intervention of the Gambino crime family in New York, a deal was worked out that allowed the surviving Inzerillos to take refuge in the US, with the agreement that none of them, or their offspring, could ever return to Sicily. Many went to the New York area and joined forces with the Gambino family. They were dubbed "gli scappati" (the escapees).

== Heroin trafficking ==
Despite a ban on drug dealing, the Gambinos were heavily involved in international heroin trafficking out of Bensonhurst. John Gambino was the converging point in the United States for a consortium of heroin traffickers of the Sicilian Mafia, composed of the Inzerillo family and Stefano Bontade, and the final destination for its shipments of heroin that was refined in laboratories in Sicily from Turkish morphine base. His relative Salvatore Inzerillo was the Gambino brothers’ principal interlocutor, the central personage in Sicily, with a myriad of interests and heavy capital investments.

Giovanni Falcone, the investigating magistrate who was assigned the heroin trafficking case in 1980, estimated that by the late 1970s the Inzerillo-Gambino-Spatola network was smuggling US$600 million worth of heroin into the US each year.

== Money laundering ==
Gambino had close relationship with the Italian banker Michele Sindona. They dined often and openly at the luxurious Hotel Pierre on Fifth Avenue or the Gambino’s Café Valentino. Gambino was a frequent guest at New York dinner parties in Sindona’s honour. When Sindona got in trouble and was indicted for the bankruptcy of the Franklin National Bank, John Gambino procured a false passport and helped to stage a bogus kidnap in August 1979, to conceal a mysterious 11-week trip to Sicily before his scheduled fraud trial.

However, Sindona also had put the Mafia’s heroin money at risk, due to his financial malpractice. The real purpose of the kidnapping was to issue sparsely disguised blackmail notes to Sindona’s past political allies – among them Prime Minister Giulio Andreotti – to engineer the rescue of his banks and recuperate Cosa Nostra’s money. Gambino accompanied Sindona’s attempt to recover the money, but the plans failed and Sindona was arrested, leading to the indictment of the Inzerillo-Spatola-Gambino network. It remains unclear if any of the Mafia money Sindona had lost was recovered.

Indicted in 1980 in relation with the heroin trafficking network, he was convicted and sentenced to six-and-a-half years jail sentence for heroin trafficking in Palermo (the sentence in absentia was confirmed by Italy’s Supreme Court in 1985). However, Gambino remained free because the US did not agree with Italian requests for extradition. John and Joe Gambino were acquitted in a 1984 New Jersey drug case in which their brother, Rosario, was convicted and sentenced to 45 years in prison.

== Operation Iron Tower ==
On December 1, 1988, Italian and US law enforcement cracked down on the Gambino-Inzerillo network again with Operation Iron Tower. Italian and federal prosecutors indicted some 200 defendants in Italy and the US on drug trafficking charges. Among the arrestees was Joe Gambino, the owner of Cafe Giardino. A crowd of about 100 had gathered at the cafe to hear a newly arrived Italian singer. Federal agents moved in as the entertainment ended with one agent coming to the mike and saying, in effect, "This is your last dance." Some of the partygoers thought it was a joke and laughed, while a few tried to run but were caught. John Gambino wasn't charged – the FBI couldn't gather enough evidence against him – but was described in the court affidavit as the current leader of the "Brooklyn-based Sicilian faction of the Gambino family."

The brothers were released after initial indictments in 1988 and 1989. John Gambino was arrested on January 4, 1990. He later was charged in a superseding indictment with narcotics and racketeering violations. On January 5, 1990, he was released on a US$2 million personal recognizance bond signed by his wife Vittoria Gambino and his son Tommy Gambino.

Due to testimonies of Mafia turncoats such as Sammy Gravano of the New York Gambino crime family and Francesco Marino Mannoia, an Italian pentito who had become a government witness, Joe and John Gambino and six other defendants – including Francesco Inzerillo – were indicted on charges that they smuggled and distributed drugs, operated a number of organized-crime enterprises and took part in the 1988 murder of Francesco Oliveri. However, the brothers failed to appear at their arraignment on September 1, 1992, at the Federal District Court in Manhattan, forfeiting US$5 million bail. Electronic monitoring bracelets intended to keep track of them had been removed with the approval of the Government in July that year.

== Arrest and trial ==
On September 17, 1992, John and Joe Gambino were arrested in a secluded motel suite in Fort Lauderdale, South Florida, where they were said to have associates who would help them flee to Venezuela, where they owned an interest in a ranch. They were returned to Manhattan for trial.

In February 1993, the trial against John and Joe Gambino, and their associates Lorenzo Mannino and Matteo Romano, started. The prosecution portrayed them as the main distributors of heroin smuggled from Italy and South America to Miami and New York by the Sicilian Mafia, while the defense countered that the central drug and murder charges in the case were based on the uncorroborated testimony of Marino Mannoia and Gravano, whom the defense depicted as "killers and liars". The trial ended in mistrial in June 1993 when a jury was unable to reach a verdict on charges of racketeering, drug trafficking and murder.

Marino Mannoia was admitted into the Witness Protection Program in the United States (Italy had no such programme at the time). He testified he had met with John Gambino personally, who had inspected the quality of the heroin Marino Mannoia was refining in Palermo. His testimony finally induced the Gambinos to plead guilty to drug trafficking in an arrangement with prosecution.

== Guilty plea ==
In June 1994, after prosecutors recommended 15-year sentences without parole, the men agreed to plead guilty to the racketeering charges stemming from activity that took place from 1975 to 1992.

The pentito Gaspare Mutolo revealed that he organised a 400-kilogram shipment of heroin to the US in 1981. The Cuntrera-Caruana Mafia clan received half of the load, while John Gambino took possession of the other 200 kilograms. The shipments were financed by a consortium of Sicilian Mafia clans, who had organized a pool to provide the money to buy the merchandise from Thai suppliers.

== Release ==
In prison Gambino survived a stroke, heart attacks, and open-heart surgery. Sitting in a wheelchair, he was released in October 2005, but was later arrested to face an extradition request by Italy. He was released on bail. In September 2006, he was freed when a federal judge overruled a decision that would have extradited him to Italy to face drug charges. The judge ruled that Gambino had already served a 15-year sentence in the US for drug trafficking and murder and could not be tried again for the same charges in Italy.

According to court papers filed in Brooklyn Federal Court, John Gambino was one of a three-man panel that ran the Gambino family, jointly with Daniel Marino and Bartolomeo "Bobby" Vernace after Operation Old Bridge in February 2008 decapitated the leadership. They oversaw a slimmed-down criminal gang of 200 made men active in drug trafficking, extortion and loansharking, according to the FBI. He was a high-ranking member of the family along with his wife's nephew Frank Cali. On November 16, 2017, Gambino died of natural causes in New York.
