= Bernardo Mattarella =

Italian politician (1905–1971)

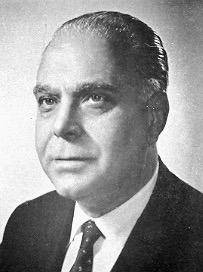
- Mattarella in 1968

Minister of Agriculture and Forests
- In office 21 June 1963 – 4 December 1963
- Prime Minister: Giovanni Leone
- Preceded by: Mariano Rumor
- Succeeded by: Mario Ferrari Aggradi

Minister of Posts and Telecommunications
- In office 19 May 1957 – 1 July 1958
- Prime Minister: Adone Zoli
- Preceded by: Giovanni Braschi
- Succeeded by: Alberto Simonini

Minister of Foreign Trade
- In office 4 December 1963 – 23 February 1966
- Prime Minister: Aldo Moro
- Preceded by: Giuseppe Trabucchi
- Succeeded by: Giusto Tolloy
- In office 6 July 1955 – 19 May 1957
- Prime Minister: Antonio Segni
- Preceded by: Mario Martinelli
- Succeeded by: Guido Carli

Minister of Transports
- In office 18 August 1953 – 6 July 1955
- Prime Minister: Giuseppe Pella; Amintore Fanfani; Mario Scelba
- Preceded by: Giuseppe Togni
- Succeeded by: Armando Angelini

Minister of Merchant Navy
- In office 16 July 1953 – 18 August 1953
- Prime Minister: Alcide De Gasperi
- Preceded by: Pietro Campilli
- Succeeded by: Costantino Bresciani Turroni
Parliamentary offices
Member of the Chamber of Deputies
In office 8 May 1948 – 1 March 1971
Constituency	Palermo
Member of the Constituent Assembly
In office 25 June 1946 – 31 January 1948
Constituency	Palermo

Personal details
- Born: 15 September 1905 Castellammare del Golfo, Sicily, Kingdom of Italy
- Died: 1 March 1971 (aged 65) Rome, Lazio, Italy
- Party: Christian Democracy
- Spouse: Maria Buccellato (m. 1933)
- Children: 4, including Piersanti and Sergio
- Relatives: Laura Mattarella (granddaughter)
- Education: University of Palermo

Bernardo Mattarella (15 September 1905 – 1 March 1971) was an Italian politician for the Christian Democrat party (DC). He was a cabinet minister of Italy several times, becoming one of the most important politicians of his generation.

He was the father of Piersanti and Sergio Mattarella, who both went on to become important politicians in their own right; Sergio has been the President of the Italian Republic since 3 February 2015, and Piersanti was President of the Regional Government of Sicily prior to being assassinated in 1980 by the Mafia.

== Early life and political career ==
Bernardo Mattarella was born in Castellammare del Golfo, in the province of Trapani in western Sicily, as the eldest of seven children in a family of humble origins. He was the son of Santo Mattarella, a sailor, and Caterina Di Falco. In 1924, he became the secretary of the Italian People's Party (PPI), the predecessor of the Christian Democrat party (DC), in Castellammare.

An anti-fascist, he graduated in law in Palermo, where he lived until the Allied invasion of Sicily. He moved to Rome, where he took part in the founding of the DC in May 1943 with Alcide De Gasperi. After the invasion of Sicily by allied forces in July 1943, he moved back to Palermo where he became one of the co-founders of the DC on the island and was nominated in the municipal council of Palermo by the Allied Military Government of Occupied Territories (AMGOT).

=== Positions in the Italian Government ===
Mattarella held the position of Deputy Minister for Public Education in the governments led by Ivanoe Bonomi (1944–1945). In June 1946, he was elected to the Italian Constituent Assembly and in 1948 to the new Republican Parliament. He would be re-elected in 1953, 1958, 1963 and 1968.

In 1953, after having been Minister of the Merchant Navy under De Gasperi's short-lived government, he became Minister of Transportation, a position he maintained until 1955. Later he was Minister of Foreign Trade and Minister of Post and Communications. A favourable evaluation of his work as the Minister of Foreign Trade and of Post and Communications is expressed in Guido Carli's memories. In 1962 he was again Minister of Transportation and, in the following year, of Agriculture and Forests. In 1963–66 he was again Minister of Foreign Trades.

=== Attitude towards Sicilian separatism ===
Mattarella was the main opponent of the Sicilian separatism, which had some influence in the years following the end of World War II. He expressed his concern in an article published in 1944 attacking the leader of the separatists, Andrea Finocchiaro Aprile: "This man speaks of democracy, but he has the grave fault of having gathered and tried to strengthen the most dangerous and oppressing organization which, for long years, has afflicted our land."

== Accusations of links with the Mafia ==
Mattarella has been accused several times of having links with the Sicilian Mafia. These accusations were always rejected in court. The alleged links between Mattarella and the Mafia are described in several reports and books. According to a report of the section of the Communist Party of Trapani, which was reproduced in the final report of the Antimafia Commission in 1976, Mattarella had an excellent relationship with the Mafia boss of Alcamo, Vincenzo Rimi. The Communist minority of the Parliamentary Antimafia Commission described Mattarella as the man "who had striven to absorb Mafia forces into the Christian Democrats so as to use them as an instrument of power."

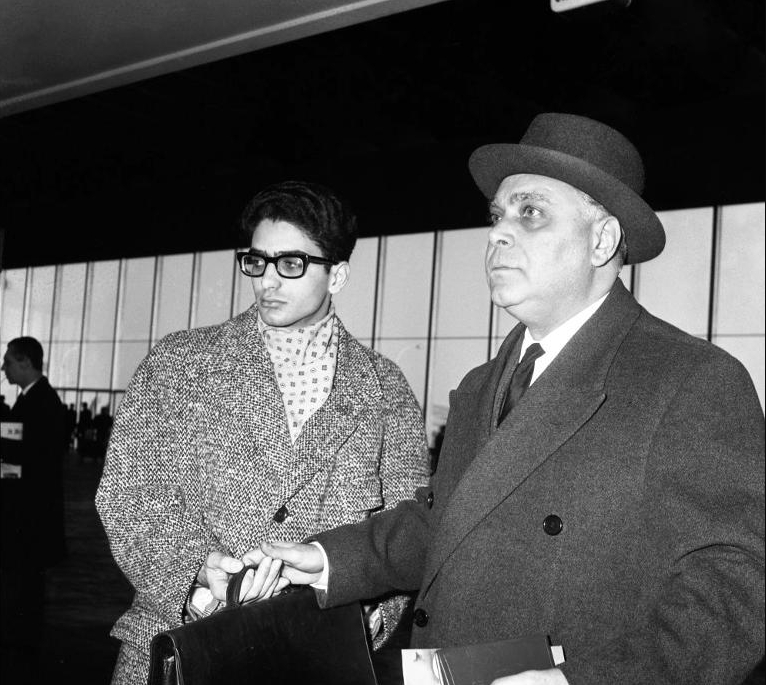
Bernardo Mattarella and his son Sergio, the future president of Italy, in 1963

He was accused of having approached Calogero Vizzini, supposedly the most influential Mafia boss at the time to abandon the Sicilian separatists and join the Christian Democrats. The accusation was made by the Italian communists on the basis of an article that Mattarella published on the national Christian democrat newspaper, Il Popolo, on 24 September 1944. This article does not contain any invitation neither to Vizzini nor to the Mafia to join the Christian Democrats. On the contrary, the article accused two families of the town of Villalba (Vizzini and Cipolla) of being responsible of the violence in that town. The article was addressed to those who had voted for the separatists, which were invited to change their vote.

In a letter to Luigi Sturzo, written shortly after the election of the Constituent Assembly of Italy in 1946, Mattarella wrote about the electoral and political influence of the Mafia: "The electoral fight has been hard and tiring, but it has granted us the result of the full failure of the Mafia: it has been defeated by the state ballot, which has freed electors from old style pressures, which have been now and then renewed." According to a report of the Carabinieri on the electoral campaign of 1946 in Salemi, Mattarella gathered with known mafiosi, among them Ignazio Salvo, one of the Salvo cousins who became intermediates between the Mafia and the DC.

Mattarella supported Vito Ciancimino – the first Italian politician to be found guilty of Mafia membership. Ciancimino became a protégé of Mattarella, who supported his political and financial career. In 1950 Ciancimino obtained concessions for all railway transport inside Palermo. The three other firms that had made a bid were put out of the game, because Ciancimino's bid was accompanied by a letter of Mattarella, who was then Minister of Transports.

=== Portella della Ginestra massacre ===
He was accused of being one of the men behind the Portella della Ginestra massacre, when 11 persons were killed and 33 wounded during May Day celebrations in Sicily on 1 May 1947. The bloodbath was perpetrated by the bandit Salvatore Giuliano who was possibly backed by the Mafia. In the Portella della Ginestra massacre trial in 1950–51 in Viterbo, Giuliano's right-hand man Gaspare Pisciotta said: "Those who have made promises to us are called Bernardo Mattarella, Prince Alliata, the monarchist MP Marchesano and also Signor Scelba, Minister for Home Affairs ... it was Marchesano, Prince Alliata and Bernardo Mattarella who ordered the massacre of Portella di Ginestra. Before the massacre they met Giuliano..." Mattarella, Alliata and Marchesano were declared innocent by the Court of Appeal of Palermo, at a trial which dealt with their alleged role in the event.

The Court of Viterbo decided that Pisciotta had made false accusations. In his final statement the public prosecutor affirmed that Pisciotta was unreliable and that his accusations against Scelba and Mattarella were untrustworthy. During the trial, Giuliano's mother and some members of the gang said that Pisciotta's statements were part of a plot designed to put the investigations on the wrong track. This was confirmed before the Parliamentary Antimafia Commission by two more members of the gang, who had joined Pisciotta in this plot. "It was simply an infamous act that even the toughness of the political game cannot justify," Mattarella later said about the accusation.

According to some sources, he had opposed the constitution of the Parliamentary Antimafia Commission in 1958. Others maintain that he had been the only Sicilian minister in the Government of the time who was favourable to its constitution. In an interview in the newspaper Gazzetta del Mezzogiorno, he put forward several proposals that influenced the constitution of the Commission in 1963.

=== Accusations by Danilo Dolci ===
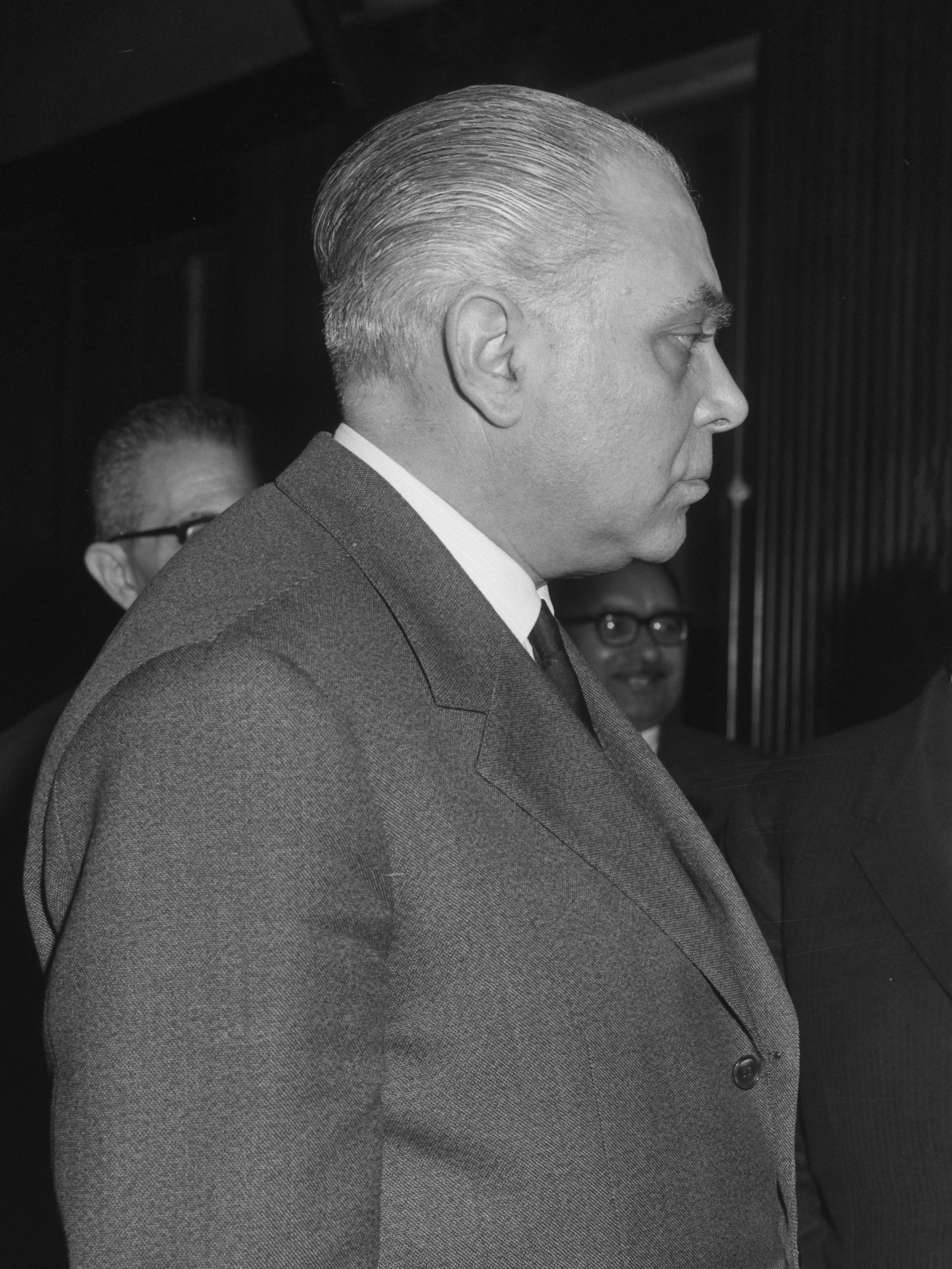
Bernardo Mattarella in 1964

The Antimafia activist Danilo Dolci also accused Mattarella of collusion with the Mafia. Dolci had been gathering evidence on the links between the Mafia and politicians for the Antimafia Commission, which was established in 1963. At a press conference in September 1965, he presented dozen of testimonies of people who had supposedly seen Mattarella meeting with leading mafiosi. Mattarella sued Dolci and his assistant Alasia for libel. Mattarella's lawsuit for libel allowed Dolci "ampia facoltà di prova", meaning that the defendant would have been declared innocent if he had been able to show that he had offended the plaintiff on the basis of true evidence. In the ensuing two-year trial, dozens of witnesses were heard and many documents were considered. Dolci made an application for an amnesty, but was sentenced to two years imprisonment for libel. He never served the verdict, because of a general pardon.

When the Court refused to allow new evidence from witnesses, Dolci and Alasia decided that the trial was a travesty. They announced that under these circumstances they would no longer attempt to defend themselves. The remainder of the trial, therefore, took place with Dolci and Alasia absent from the courtroom. Dolci responded by broadcasting his opinions over a private radio station, which was promptly closed. On 21 June 1967, the Court of Rome, sentenced that Mattarella offered reliable evidence of his opposition to the Mafia in the entire course of his political career. The statements collected by the defendants – Dolci and Alasia – were considered nothing more than "deplorable gossip, malicious rumour or even simple lies." The Court was of the opinion that Mattarella "never had relations with the Mafia environment."

Mattarella won the trial but lost a cabinet post in the new government of Aldo Moro. According to the journalist and politician Luigi Barzini, who had been a member of the Antimafia Commission, few of Dolci's charges against Mattarella, most of which were undoubtedly true but not all as decisive as he thought, could be proved in a court of law, as Sicilian witnesses rarely repeat in public what they might have said secretly to a trusted friend.

=== Other accusations ===
US gangster Joe Bonanno claimed that Mattarella was among the welcoming party that met him when he landed at Fiumicino airport in Rome in October 1957 for a vacation. Both had grown up in Castellammare del Golfo. However, the claim seems to be fictional: it describes Bonanno's trip to Italy in September 1957, in the company of F. Pope, the editor of the newspaper "Il progresso italo americano". As reported by the same newspaper they arrived in Rome on 13 September of that year. According to Pope and Italian newspapers, Mattarella was not in Rome that day. As Minister of the Post, was in another remote Italian town to inaugurate a public work.

In 1996, 25 years after Mattarella died, Francesco Di Carlo, a Mafia pentito, said he had been a "man of honour" – a member of Cosa Nostra. His son Sergio Mattarella dismissed such accusations as ridiculous. According to another pentito, Francesco Marino Mannoia, Mattarella was close with the Mafia boss Francesco Paolo Bontade, but Mannoia said he did not know if Mattarella actually had been a member of the Mafia.

== Death and legacy ==
Mattarella died in Rome in 1971. Journalist Gaia Servadio described him as an elegant gentleman with an elaborate and fluent discourse that disclosed his legal training. He was recognized as an able minister, in particular at the post of Foreign Trade, which he held twice.

His son Piersanti Mattarella was killed by the Mafia in 1980. His assassination was probably spurred by his strong commitment against the relationships of numerous Sicilian politicians (mostly members of DC itself) with the Mafia. He was "committed to introducing a new transparency in the functioning of his party and in the Sicilian public life". However, the Mafia felt betrayed by the Mattarellas who used to be responsive to Mafia interests. According to Leoluca Orlando – former mayor of Palermo for the DC and Antimafia activist, who had been a legal adviser to Piersanti Mattarella – the rumours about his father and his party's experiences with the Mafia were probably responsible for Piersanti's aspiration to clean the Christian Democrat party of any such connections.

His other son Sergio Mattarella was elected by parliament to be the 12th President of the Italian Republic in January 2015, being the first Sicilian to have held the post.

== Electoral history ==
Election	House	Constituency	Party	Votes	Result
1946	Constituent Assembly	Palermo–Trapani–Agrigento–Caltanissetta	DC	38,674	Elected
1948	Chamber of Deputies	Palermo–Trapani–Agrigento–Caltanissetta	DC	78,706	Elected
1953	Chamber of Deputies	Palermo–Trapani–Agrigento–Caltanissetta	DC	86,375	Elected
1958	Chamber of Deputies	Palermo–Trapani–Agrigento–Caltanissetta	DC	120,757	Elected
1963	Chamber of Deputies	Palermo–Trapani–Agrigento–Caltanissetta	DC	101,648	Elected
1968	Chamber of Deputies	Palermo–Trapani–Agrigento–Caltanissetta	DC	70,698	Elected

== See also ==
- Political connection of Stefano Bontade

== Sources ==
- (in Italian) Bolignani, Giovanni (2001). Bernardo Mattarella: biografia politica di un cattolico siciliano, Rubbettino Editore, ISBN 88-498-0214-5
- (in Italian) Caruso, Alfio (2000). Da cosa nasce cosa. Storia della mafia del 1943 a oggi, Milan: Longanesi ISBN 88-304-1620-7
- (in Italian) Casarrubea, Giuseppe (1998). "Fra' diavolo" e il governo nero: "doppio Stato" e stragi nella Sicilia del dopoguerra, Milan: Franco Angeli, ISBN 88-464-0820-9
- (in Italian) Deaglio, Enrico (2010). Il raccolto rosso, 1982–2010: cronaca di una guerra di mafia e delle sue tristissime conseguenze, Milan: Il Saggiatore, ISBN 978-88-428-1620-1
- Dickie, John (2004). Cosa Nostra. A history of the Sicilian Mafia. London: Coronet. ISBN 0-340-82435-2.
- Hess, Henner (1998). Mafia & Mafiosi: Origin, Power, and Myth, London: Hurst & Co Publishers, ISBN 1-85065-500-6
- Orlando, Leoluca (2003). Fighting the Mafia and Renewing Sicilian Culture, New York: Encounter Books, ISBN 1-893554-81-3
- (in Italian) Ragone, Michele (2011). Le parole di Danilo Dolci, Foggia: Edizioni del Rosone, ISBN 978-88-97220-19-0
- Servadio, Gaia (1978). Mafioso. A history of the Mafia from its origins to the present day. London: Secker & Warburg. ISBN 0-436-44700-2.
