= Gian Maria Aliberti Gerbotto =

Italian writer (born 1972)

- Born: 20 May 1972 (age 54); Bagnolo Piemonte, Piemonte, Italy
- Occupation: Writer
- Children: 1

Gian Maria Aliberti Gerbotto (born 1972) is an Italian writer.

== Biography ==
His works include, Il Vippaio (2007) with a preface by Maurizio Costanzo; Strano Amore (2009) with a preface by Franca Rame; Il metodo antisfiga (2011), Sopravvivere ai rapporti di coppia (2014), Basta Partire (2016), Cammina davanti l'ombra (2019). In 2025, “L’aria di Cuneo” was released, a fictional detective novel featuring the real-life protagonist, the famous television journalist for Rai 1, Vincenzo Mollica.

He was awarded the Knight of Merit of the Italian Republic in 2010 by the President Giorgio Napolitano. In 2021, President Mattarella promoted him to Officer of the Order of Merit of the Italian Republic.

His literary work was recognized with an honourable mention at the International Literary Prize Casino di Sanremo and an award by the Res Aulica Academy of Bologna.

In 2019, the Municipality of Casteldelfino granted him Honorary Citizenship his novel L'ottavo giorno di Katarina, published in 2017, brought national visibility to the small mountain town.

He appeared on national television and radio programmes (such as La vita in diretta, Estate in diretta, Una Zeta a Pois) to talk about gossip.

He is one of the 50 thousand "remarkable Italians" whose biography is included in the "Catalogue of the living" by the journalist Giorgio Dell'Arti.

Since 2015 he has also written detective novels, set in the area, which were immediately considered fictionalized tourist guides.

All his novels were donated to the Italian Union of the Blind to be made into audiobooks and made available free of charge to all blind people.

== Recognition ==
- 2022 – Honourable mention at the Antonio Semeria Casino Sanremo International Literary Award
- 2015 – Literary Prize Res Aulica Academy of Bologna

Knight of the Order of Merit of the Italian Republic

Medal record

Officer of the Order of Merit of the Italian Republic

Medal record
