= Bontadini =

Bontadini may refer to:

- Bontadino de Bontadini (died 1620), Italian hydraulic engineer, architect, mathematician and wood carver
- Franco Bontadini (1893–1943), Italian footballer
- Gustavo Bontadini (1903–1990), Italian leading Neothomistic philosopher

== See also ==
- Bontade, a surname
