= Art Roth =

Art Roth may also refer to:

- Arthur Roth, Olympic athlete
- Arthur T. Roth, American banker
