= Mattarella =

Mattarella is an Italian surname that may refer to the following notable people:

- Bernardo Mattarella (1905–1971), Italian politician, father of Piersanti and Sergio
- Laura Mattarella (born 1968), Italian lawyer, daughter of Sergio
- Piersanti Mattarella (1935–1980), Italian politician, brother of Sergio
- Sergio Mattarella (born 1941), President of Italy
