= Bruno Contrada =

Italian police and intelligence officer (1931–2026)

Contrada c. 1989

Bruno Contrada (2 September 1931 – 12 March 2026) was an Italian police and intelligence officer who was the police chief of Palermo and deputy director of the civil intelligence service SISDE. He was arrested based on revelations of former Sicilian Mafiosi turned pentiti (en: collaborators of justice); Gaspare Mutolo and Giuseppe Marchese.

== Life and career ==
Bruno Contrada was born in Naples on 2 September 1931. He joined the Italian police in 1958 and, in 1973, was appointed head of the judiciary police in Palermo.

In 1982, he transferred to SISDE, where he was responsible for the agency's operations in Sicily and Sardinia. In 1986, he was promoted to the Operational Division of the SISDE headquarters in Rome. In 1992, under the direction of then-Interior Minister Nicola Mancino, Contrada and the head of the Italian police, Arturo Parisi, held a secret meeting with anti-Mafia judge Paolo Borsellino. According to reports, Borsellino was deeply disturbed by the meeting, and was assassinated two days later in Palermo. Contrada later claimed to have been a friend of Borsellino, but the judge's family strongly denied this. Another prominent anti-Mafia judge, Giovanni Falcone—who had been killed two months earlier—had also stated that he did not trust Contrada.

Contrada was arrested on 24 December 1992. He was accused of having informed the Mafia about upcoming police operations and obstructing the early capture of fugitive Corleonesi boss Totò Riina.

Suspicion had first arisen in 1984, when Mafia informant (pentito) Tommaso Buscetta warned anti-Mafia prosecutor Giovanni Falcone that Contrada was allegedly protecting certain Mafia bosses and tipping them off about planned police raids. Falcone also suspected that Contrada had alerted the Mafia to his intention to meet with visiting Swiss prosecutors at his summer house in Addaura on 19 June 1989 – when an assassination attempt was made on his life. During investigations into Mafia-linked money laundering in Switzerland, Contrada was again implicated for allegedly warning a suspect about an imminent arrest, allowing the individual to flee.

His first trial began on 12 April 1994. After 22 hearings, the proceedings concluded on 5 April 1996, with Contrada being sentenced to ten years in prison for collusion with the Mafia. On 4 May 2001, the Court of Appeal acquitted him, but on 12 December 2002, the Court of Cassation annulled the acquittal and ordered a retrial before a different section of the Court of Appeal of Palermo. On 26 February 2006, following 31 hours of deliberation, the appellate court confirmed the original verdict and sentenced Contrada again to ten years in prison, along with payment of court costs. On 10 May 2007, the Court of Cassation upheld the conviction.

In 2015, the European Court of Human Rights ruled that Contrada had been convicted for actions that, at the time, were not classified as crimes, thus violating the principle of non-retroactivity of criminal law (nulla poena sine lege). In 2017, 25 years after his arrest, the Supreme Court of Cassation definitively annulled his conviction.

Contrada died on 12 March 2026, at the age of 94.

== Sources ==
- Stille, Alexander (1995). Excellent Cadavers. The Mafia and the Death of the First Italian Republic, New York: Vintage ISBN 0-09-959491-9
