= Francesco Paolo Bontade =

Member of the Sicilian Mafia

- Born: Francesco Paolo Bontade; 3 May 1914; Villagrazia, Sicily, Kingdom of Italy
- Died: 25 February 1974 (aged 59); Messina, Sicily, Italy
- Other name: Don Paolino Bontà
- Children: Stefano Bontade; Giovanni Bontade
- Allegiance: Santa Maria di Gesù Mafia family / Sicilian Mafia

Francesco Paolo Bontade (3 May 1914 – 25 February 1974), also known as Don Paolino Bontà, was an influential and powerful member of the Sicilian Mafia. Some sources spell his surname Bontate. He hailed from Villagrazia, a rural village before it was absorbed into the city of Palermo in the 1960s. His father Stefano had been a powerful Mafia boss in the area that included Santa Maria di Gesù and Guadagna.

== Traditional capomafia ==
Vizzini's funeral in Villalba. The imposing figure on the left of the coffin is Paolino Bontate.

Paolino Bontade was born into a rural family in Villagrazia and was affiliated by his father into Mafia of Santa Maria di Gesù. The family owned the estate Fondo Magliocco halfway between the villages Guadagna and Villagrazia (later absorbed into the city of Palermo) in the Conca d'Oro (the Golden Shell), the name of the plain surrounding Palermo and a rich production area of oranges, olives and almond trees. In 1933, he was arrested a first time for brawling and illegal possession of a firearm. After World War II, he was involved in food smuggling and cattle theft.

According to the Palermo criminal court, Don Paolino embodied “the traditional capomafia who intervenes directly in all matters in his area, arbitrating private disputes, assuming the role of great protector of his citizens, infiltrating public offices and private companies, exercising his influence through sly and hidden intimidation systems covered up by formally correct and respectful behaviour.”

He was a pallbearer at the funeral of Mafia boss Calogero Vizzini – one of the most influential Mafia bosses of Sicily after World War II until his death in 1954. He stood next to Giuseppe Genco Russo – considered to be the heir of Vizzini – an indication of the Mafia stature of Bontade.

== Political connections ==
Like Vizzini, Bontade first backed the Sicilian separatist movement after the Allied invasion of the island in 1943. When it became clear that an independent Sicily was not feasible, he switched to support the Monarchist Party. In 1958, he backed the regional Sicilian government of Silvio Milazzo, an atypical coalition government that was supported by Communists, Monarchists, Neo-Fascists and dissident Christian Democrats. The government was formed in protest against infringement on Sicilian autonomy and threat to Sicilian patronage by the Christian Democrat party headquarters in Rome. He did not hesitate to publicly slap in the face the regional deputy Ernesto Pivetti (fr) to ‘convince’ him to remain in the coalition of Milazzo.

After this interlude, he became a staunch supporter of the Christian Democrats, through his connection with the Salvo cousins – other supporters of Milazzo who, as a result, gained control over the private concession for collecting taxes in Sicily. The Salvos and Bontade withdrew their support for Milazzo when the mainstream Christian Democrats tried to regain control of the region. The relation with the Salvos allowed Don Paolino, and later his son Stefano Bontade, access to influential regional politicians.

According to the pentito, Francesco Marino Mannoia, he was close with Bernardo Mattarella, an important Christian Democrat politician and Minister in various governments in the 1950s and 1960s. Don Paolino Bontà flaunted his political relations by strolling arm in arm with the Christian democratic deputy Francesco Barbaccia every morning in front of the Hotel Centrale in the Corso Vittorio Emanuele, one of the main streets in Palermo.

== Exercising his power ==
He used his excellent connections to secure the location Eletronica Siciliana (ELSI), a subsidiary of the huge US defence contractor Raytheon, in his district in 1962. The Italian manager of the factory later testified to the parliament's Antimafia Commission about why he had to deal with the Mafia boss: “Paolo Bonta is useful to me, he provides me with the water I need, he gives me the land to expand the factory and I depend on him for workers to run the factory.” He had first noted the muscle of Bontade when, during a meeting in the factory where all the highest regional and local authorities were present, the door opened and a short, fat man walked in. Everyone immediately turned to the new arrival to embrace him. “At that moment, I understood what the word ‘mafia’ meant,” he later recalled.

== Banishment and resignation ==
In December 1962, he was arrested for criminal conspiracy and murder but acquitted in the preliminary investigation due to insufficient evidence. In March 1963, Carabinieri lieutenant Mario Malausa (who was later killed in the 1963 Ciaculli Massacre) included him on the list of the most powerful mafia bosses in the eastern area of Palermo.

In July 1963, in the aftermath of the First Mafia War (1962–1963) and the Ciaculli Massacre that prompted the first concerted Antimafia efforts by the state in post-war Italy, Bontade was among the many that received an internal banishment in Italy to dislodge Mafiosi from their home towns. Around 1964, Don Paolino Bontade, stepped down as head of the Mafia family because of ill health; he suffered from diabetes. His son Stefano Bontade succeeded him as the boss of the Mafia family. In December 1968, he was absolved in the Trial of the 114, relating to the First Mafia War.

He died on 25 February 1974, after he spent six months as a bedridden patient in a hospital in Messina. His funeral mass was attended by hundreds of citizens. At least 500 people walked past the solid walnut coffin in the local church to kiss the cheek of Bontade's eldest son, Stefano. Along the flower-decorated Via Villagrazia, five trucks full of flowers drove by, including dozens of bouquets from politicians and bureaucrats. A weeping parish priest pronounced a eulogy: "Don Paolino Bontate was the personification of goodness."

His two sons, Stefano Bontade and Giovanni Bontade, rose to prominence in the Mafia. In 1981, Stefano was killed by the rival faction within Cosa Nostra, the Corleonesi. His death sparked a brutal Mafia War. Giovanni was killed in 1988 by the Corleonesi.

== Sources ==
- (in Italian) Cancila, Orazio (2001), La terra di Cerere, Caltanissetta-Roma: Sciascia ISBN 88-8241-100-1
- (in Italian) Caruso, Alfio (2000). Da cosa nasce cosa. Storia della mafia del 1943 a oggi, Milan: Longanesi ISBN 88-304-1620-7
- Dickie, John (2004). Cosa Nostra. A history of the Sicilian Mafia, London: Coronet, ISBN 0-340-82435-2
- (in Italian) Dino, Alessandra (2008). La mafia devota. Chiesa, religione, Cosa Nostra, Bari: Laterza ISBN 978-88-420-8520-1
- Lupo, Salvatore (2009). History of the Mafia, New York: Columbia University Press, ISBN 978-0-231-13134-6
- (in Italian) Pantaleone, Michele (1969). Antimafia: occasione mancata, Turin: Einaudi
- (in Italian) Pantaleone, Michele (1970). Il sasso in bocca: Mafia e Cosa Nostra, Bologna: Cappelli
- Paoli, Letizia (2003). Mafia Brotherhoods: Organized Crime, Italian Style, New York: Oxford University Press ISBN 0-19-515724-9
- Seindal, René (1998). Mafia: Money and Politics in Sicily, 1950-1997, Copenhagen: Museum Tusculanum Press ISBN 87-7289-455-5
- Stille, Alexander (1995). Excellent Cadavers. The Mafia and the Death of the First Italian Republic, New York: Vintage ISBN 0-09-959491-9
