= Gaspare Mutolo =

Member of the Sicilian Mafia

Gaspare Mutolo (Palermo, February 5, 1940) is a Sicilian mafioso, also known as "Asparino". In 1992 he became a pentito (state witness against the Mafia). He was the first mafioso who spoke about the connections between Cosa Nostra and Italian politicians. Mutolo's declarations contributed to the indictment of Italy's former Prime Minister Giulio Andreotti and to an understanding of the context of the 1992 Mafia murders of the politician Salvo Lima and the magistrates Giovanni Falcone and Paolo Borsellino.

== Early career ==
Mutolo grew up in the narrow streets of Pallavicino and the neighbourhood of Partanna-Mondello in Palermo. He left school and started working as a mechanic. At the same time, he was involved in a car-theft ring. He lived in the world of Cosa Nostra since his youth. Several of his blood family were members of the Mafia.

In 1965 he ended up in prison for the first time. In the Ucciardone prison in Palermo he shared a cell with Totò Riina, the future boss of the Corleonesi. Noticing the deference with which Riina was treated, Mutolo realized that his cellmate had to be someone important and ingratiated himself with Riina by letting him win at cards. When they both left prison, Mutolo was Riina's personal driver for a while – a position of great trust.

In 1973, Mutolo was initiated into the Partanna-Mondello family headed by Rosario Riccobono. The affiliation took place in the Poggio Vallesana farmhouse, in Marano di Napoli, owned by the historical Camorra boss Lorenzo Nuvoletta, an ally of the Corleonesi. "When I became a member, it was for me a new life, with new rules. For me only Cosa Nostra existed.", he later recalled. He became the right-hand man of Riccobono and Riina's trusted man for delicate missions. In 1976 and 1982, Mutolo was arrested again, and during one of his sojourns in prison, he became the cellmate of the old boss of the Corleonesi, Luciano Leggio (later he claimed that he had painted the pictures that are attributed to Leggio).

Thanks to his close ties with the Corleonesi, he survived the massacre that wiped out the old guard including former Corleonesi ally Riccobono of the Partanna-Mondello Mafia family at the end of 1982, in the midst of the Second Mafia War.

== Heroin trafficker ==
Important supply lines of morphine base and heroin to the Sicilian Mafia were set up in the late 1970s and early 1980s after Cosa Nostra members Pietro Vernengo and Gaspare Mutolo shared prison cells in Italy with the Turkish trafficker, Yasar Avni Musullulu, and the Singapore-born Chinese, Koh Bak Kin. Sicilian judges estimate that between 1981 and 1983, Mussullulu alone supplied two Mafia individuals with two metric tons of morphine base for the sum of US$55 million after which he disappeared from circulation and his supply line to Italy ceased.

Koh Bak Kin was first arrested at Rome airport in 1976 with more than 20 kilograms of heroin and in 1978 was sentenced to six years in prison, where he met Mutolo. The already lenient sentence was further reduced, and Kin was released from prison in 1980. On his return to Bangkok, he was able to guarantee a steady supply of heroin to Cosa Nostra thanks to his links in northern Thailand with an emissary of the opium "baron" Khun Sa.

By tapping the phone of Mutolo, police recorded discussions about heroin smuggling between Mutolo and mafiosi in Catania. An informant was able to confirm judge Giovanni Falcone’s suspicion about the alliance between the Palermo and Catania mafias in heroin trafficking: he had participated in a meeting at Mutolo's house in Palermo, where one of the principal bosses of Palermo, Rosario Riccobono, and the top boss of Catania, Nitto Santapaola, met to discuss a massive shipment of 500 kilos of heroin.

After turning state witness, Mutolo revealed that he organized a 400-kilogram shipment of heroin to the US in 1981. The Cuntrera-Caruana Mafia clan received half of the load, while John Gambino of the Gambino Family in New York City took care of the other 200 kilograms. The shipments were financed by consortium of Sicilian Mafia clans, who had organized a pool to provide the money to buy the merchandise from Thai suppliers. The system in the heroin business was that every Mafia family could invest in a shipment if it had the money.

Mutolo was arrested in 1982 before he could finish a second shipment. His Thai supplier Koh Bak Kin was arrested when Egyptian police seized a Greek ship in the Suez Canal carrying some 233 kilos of heroin on 24 May 1983. Guarding the shipment was a Sicilian mafioso – a member of Mutolo's drug ring. Mutolo received a 16-year sentence in the Maxi Trial against the Mafia in 1987.

== Pentito ==
While in prison, Mutolo started to think about becoming a state witness (pentito) in December 1991. Mutolo decided to talk in early May 1992, he insisted on seeing Paolo Borsellino after learning that Giovanni Falcone was unavailable (Falcone ceased to be a magistrate after he had entered the Ministry of Justice in 1991). Mutolo trusted them because he knew from firsthand experience how they had worked in the Maxi Trial. Mutolo had been the chief organizer of the massive heroin ring that Falcone had broken.

However, Borsellino ran into problems with Chief Prosecutor, Pietro Giammanco. Borsellino was supposed to work on cases in south-western Sicily and Mutolo was from Palermo. There was a risk that this bureaucratic obstacle would jeopardize his cooperation. He refused to talk to anybody else and might retreat because of the uncertainty with the authorities. The stakes were high, Mutolo was probably the most important possible pentito since the defection of Francesco Marino Mannoia in 1989: he had been a cellmate and driver of Totò Riina.

Finally, Borsellino was allowed to sit in when another magistrate questioned Mutolo. On 16 July 1992, Borsellino attended another deposition of Mutolo while he was frantically investigating the killing of his friend and colleague Giovanni Falcone. The next day Mutolo started to talk about the collusion between Cosa Nostra and high-level government officials. Two days later, on 19 July 1992, Borsellino and his escort of five police officers were killed in a car bomb in Palermo on the orders of Salvatore Riina and the Sicilian Mafia Commission.

Mutolo admits to having killed more than 30 people but has not been convicted for any of the murders. In March 1993, 56 arrest warrants were issued for murders in Palermo on the basis of testimonies made by Mutolo and Giuseppe Marchese.

== Explosive declarations ==
Mutolo's declarations led to the arrest of Bruno Contrada, the deputy director of the civil intelligence service SISDE, contributed to the indictment of Giulio Andreotti and to an understanding of the context of the 1992 murders of Salvo Lima, Giovanni Falcone and Paolo Borsellino. Mutolo only began to talk of Mafia-political links after the arrest of Totò Riina in January 1993. He warned the Parliamentary Antimafia Commission presided by Luciano Violante in February 1993 of the likelihood that further attacks were being planned by the Corleonesi on the mainland.

Mutolo's declarations had tragic consequences. On 3 December 1992, one of Italy's most prominent public prosecutors Domenico Signorino committed suicide. According to newspaper leaks, Mutolo told investigators that Signorino was "close to certain circles I know." Signorino had been one of the main public prosecutors at the so-called Maxi Trial in Palermo in 1987 when he demanded life sentences for 20 accused mafiosi and sought a 17-year prison term for Mutolo. Signorino had publicly rejected the accusation, and told reporters, "if seeking 20 life sentences at the maxi-trial means I am a mafioso, then go ahead and call me that." The judge's death inspired debate over the disclosure, by newspapers, of unverified accusations by Mafia informers that could cause untold damage. It was later revealed that Signorino had gambling debts which were paid with the help of Mafia boss Rosario Riccobono and his deputy Salvatore Micalizzi, who even helped the magistrate in acquiring a house. This happened before the Maxi Trial, as Riccobono and Micalizzi had been murdered by the Corleonesi on 30 November 1982, at the peak of the Second Mafia War.

On 24 December 1992, Bruno Contrada – former Palermo police chief and deputy director of the civil intelligence service SISDE – was arrested due to revelations of Mutolo and another pentito, Giuseppe Marchese. Contrada informed the Mafia of upcoming police operations and prevented an early capture of the fugitive Totò Riina.

== Testifying in the US ==
Mutolo also testified in the United States, at the so-called Iron Tower II trial in the Southern District of New York City against Giovanni Gambino and Giuseppe Gambino and four high-ranking members of the Sicilian Mafia. Together with another cooperating witness and mafioso turned pentito, Francesco Marino Mannoia, Mutolo provided landmark testimony documenting the ongoing nexus between the Sicilian Mafia and the American Cosa Nostra. (Sicilian Mafia member, Rosario Naimo, who acted as a representative to the American Cosa Nostra for the Sicilian Mafia, remained a fugitive, until his capture in Palermo, Sicily on 2 October 2010.)

When asked why Mutolo withheld information that Francesco Marino Mannoia had been involved in Mafia murders until he learned that Mannoia had owned up to them, Mutolo explained: "Well, you see, a co-operator does not hurt justice anymore, because that person is on the side of the Justice Department. So I never mention Mannoia or some other co-operators. The reason why I did that was to avoid bringing them on the spot again."

== Mafia and politics ==
Mutolo explained the context of the 1992 massacres of the politician Salvo Lima and the magistrates Giovanni Falcone and Paolo Borsellino. He was the first mafioso who spoke about the connections between Cosa Nostra and Italian politicians. "The 'normal circuit' for all problems that needed attention in Rome was: Ignazio Salvo, the honourable Salvo Lima, and senator Giulio Andreotti," according to Mutolo. The Salvo cousins were the main contact to 'adjust' trials against Mafiosi, such as the Maxi Trial of the mid-1980s. "When the trial began, it was obvious to all 'men of honour' that it was a political trial," Mutolo explained. "We all unanimously believed that the trial verdict would be a conviction because the government had to demonstrate to public opinion within Italy and abroad... that it could strike a hard blow to Cosa Nostra." However, they were assured that the appeals would modify the sentence.

The Mafia felt betrayed by Lima and Andreotti. In their opinion, they had failed to block the confirmation of the sentence of the Maxi Trial by the Italian Supreme Court in January 1992, which upheld the Buscetta theorem that Cosa Nostra was a single hierarchical organization ruled by a commission and that its leaders could be held responsible for criminal acts that were committed to benefit the organization. The Mafia counted on Lima and Andreotti to appoint Corrado Carnevale to review the sentence. Carnevale, known as "the sentence killer", had overturned many Mafia convictions on the slenderest of technicalities previously. Carnevale, however, had to withdraw due to pressure from the public and from Giovanni Falcone – who at the time had moved to the Ministry of Justice. Falcone was backed by the minister of Justice Claudio Martelli despite the fact that he served under Prime Minister Andreotti.

"I knew that for any problems requiring a solution in Rome, Lima was the man we turned to," according to Mutolo. "Lima was killed because he did not uphold or couldn’t uphold, the commitments he had made in Palermo (…) The verdict of the Supreme Court was a disaster. After the Supreme Court verdict, we felt we were lost. That verdict was like a dose of poison for the Mafiosi, who felt like wounded animals. That’s why they carried out the massacres. Something had to happen. I was surprised when people who had eight years of prison sentence still to serve started giving themselves up. Then they killed Lima and I understood."

== Quotes ==
After the arrest of Bernardo Provenzano in April 2006: "When the pope dies, you can always make another, and that way, the church stays on its feet."

== Biography ==
- Scafetta, Valeria, U baroni di Partanna Mondello, Rome: Editori Riuniti 2003 ISBN 88-359-5461-4

== Sources ==
- Dickie, John (2004). Cosa Nostra. A history of the Sicilian Mafia, London: Coronet, ISBN 0-340-82435-2
- Jamieson, Alison (2000), The Antimafia. Italy’s Fight Against Organized Crime, London: MacMillan Press ISBN 0-333-80158-X
- Paoli, Letizia (2003). Mafia Brotherhoods: Organized Crime, Italian Style, Oxford/New York: Oxford University Press ISBN 0-19-515724-9
- Stille, Alexander (1995). Excellent Cadavers. The Mafia and the Death of the First Italian Republic, New York: Vintage ISBN 0-09-959491-9
