= Giorgio Ambrosoli =

Italian lawyer and assassination victim (1933–1979)

- Born: 17 October 1933; Milan, Kingdom of Italy
- Died: 11 July 1979 (aged 45); Milan, Italy
- Occupation: Lawyer

Giorgio Ambrosoli (Italian pronunciation: [ˈdʒordʒo ambroˈzɔːli]; 17 October 1933 – 11 July 1979) was an Italian lawyer who was gunned down while investigating the malpractice of banker Michele Sindona.

== Liquidating Sindona's financial empire ==
Appointed by the court as liquidator of the Banca Privata Italiana, one of the Italian banks controlled by Sicilian banker Michele Sindona, which was forced into liquidation, he found evidence of criminal manipulations. He provided the US Justice Department with evidence to convict Sindona for his role in the collapse of the Franklin National Bank.

According to Ambrosoli, Sindona paid a US$5.6 million commission to "an American bishop and a Milanese banker". Official Italian sources confirmed that it concerned Paul Marcinkus, of the Vatican Bank, and Roberto Calvi, president of Banco Ambrosiano.

== Death ==
On 11 July 1979, only hours after talking to US authorities, Ambrosoli was shot dead by three Mafia hitmen commissioned by Michele Sindona.

Sindona feared that Ambrosoli would expose his manipulations in the Banca Privata Italiana case. Shortly before he was killed, the American Mafia hitman William Arico, a convicted bank robber, invoked the name of Giulio Andreotti – the influential Christian Democrat politician close to Sindona – in a threatening phone call taped by Ambrosoli. Arico fell to his death while trying to escape from a federal prison in New York in 1984. Andreotti later replied in an interview that Ambrosoli "was a person who, in Romanesque words, was looking for it".

In 1986 Sindona was sentenced to life imprisonment for having ordered the murder.

== Mafia involvement in murder ==
According to the mafioso turned government witness (pentito) Francesco Marino Mannoia, Sindona laundered the proceeds of heroin trafficking for the Bontade-Spatola-Inzerillo-Gambino network. The mafiosi were determined to get their money back and would have played an important role in Sindona's attempt to save his banks.

Ambrosoli was killed shortly after he had a talk with Palermo Police chief Boris Giuliano, who discovered cheques and other documents which indicated that Sindona had been recycling the proceeds from heroin sales by the Mafia through the Vatican Bank to his Amincor Bank in Switzerland. Ten days after the killing of Ambrosoli, Giuliano was shot and killed by the Mafia on 21 July 1979.

Ambrosoli was posthumously awarded with a medal for civic heroism.

== Legacy ==
In 1995, a film about Ambrosoli was made, entitled A Middle-Class Hero and directed by Michele Placido.

In February 2026, Ambrosoli was the subject of a play by Leonardo Torrini, Fino a Ritornare Sulle Labbra: La storia di Giorgio Ambrosoli ("Until it Returns to the Lips: The Story of Giorgio Ambrosoli"), performed at Teatro Puccini in Florence.

== Sources ==
- (in Italian) Stajano, Corrado (1995). Un eroe borghese. Il caso dell'avvocato Ambrosoli assassinato dalla mafia politica, Turin: Einaudi, ISBN 978-88-06-17763-8.
- Sterling, Claire (1990). Octopus. How the long reach of the Sicilian Mafia controls the global narcotics trade, New York: Simon & Schuster, ISBN 0-671-73402-4
- Stille, Alexander (1995). Excellent Cadavers. The Mafia and the Death of the First Italian Republic, New York: Vintage ISBN 0-09-959491-9
- (in Italian) Lucarelli, Carlo (2002). Misteri d'Italia. I casi di Blu notte. Turin: Einaudi, ISBN 978-88-06-15445-5.
