= Arthur T. Roth =

Arthur Thomas Roth (December 22, 1905 in The Bronx – September 17, 1997 in Rockville Centre, New York) was an American banker.

Known as "Mr. Long Island", Arthur Roth played a key role in the development of Long Island banking from 1926 through the 1970s. Roth started as a messenger at the Manufacturers Hanover Trust Company at age 17 and rose quickly through the ranks. He began his career at Franklin National Bank in 1934 as a cashier and worked his way up to become the chief executive in 1946. In 1964 Franklin made a bold move to open branches in New York to counter a threat that New York City banks would move to Long Island and Franklin would not have the international services offered by the city's banks. During his tenure, Franklin National Bank became the 18th largest bank in the United States. Under Roth's leadership, Franklin National Bank was the first bank to issue credit cards, as well as the first to offer drive-in teller services. However, they were never well-received and became the bank of last resort for those who could not have solid banking relationships with the big city banks. Competitive loan rates and high deposit costs caused Franklin to be vulnerable to fluctuations in a new computerized interest rate environment.

In July 1968, Roth was removed from his position as chief executive due to growing loan losses and a declining stock price. His removal was precipitated by press accounts of his son Donald's connection with land deals in Suffolk County. Harold V. Gleason, then president, wanted Roth out and bad press was the best way to get rid of Roth. Some claim Roth overextended the bank by aggressively pushing into the New York City real estate market. Among other close connections the bank had, was with Webb and Knapp, developers of Roosevelt Field, on whose board Roth sat. As real estate values in New York dropped in the following years, Franklin National Bank was stressed with millions of dollars of questionable loans. The directors from a merger with the Federation Bank were persuaded by Gleason not to nominate Roth for another term as director, and Roth left the bank in 1970. Gleason then became chairman and chief executive officer, inviting Laurence Tisch to join as vice chairman as he was a 22% shareholder. Tisch served in an inactive manner until he was forced to divest his interest in franklin by the FDIC for potential conflict of interest. Tisch sold his stock to Michele Sindona, "The Popes Banker", in 1972. Gleason had spent much energy to attract Sindona to the bank as a savior to supply resources to save the failing bank. Sindona was interested in providing money laundering services for his financial customers in Italy. The favoritism for Sindona's ability to take over Franklin by the Nixon administration skirted major requirements for fiduciary responsibility, which later caused no small inconvenience to Laurence Tisch. His shadow purchase of Franklin for Sindona backfired, when he was held to account for an insufficient background investigation, before he sold the stock to Sindona. Coincidentally, the new relations with China on Nixon's part was seen as a threat to Sindona's business with his clients in Europe. This might have been interpreted as a disloyal gesture on Nixon's part by his European supporters. The additional coincidence of the Watergate break-in, a hotel owned by Sindona and the Vatican, may have been partially motivated by Nixon's paranoia about the backlash of his European supporters and how the Democratic headquarters break-in could yield information. Foiling the break-in could have been the plan by sindona to have revenge for Nixons arrangements with the Chinese. Management of Franklin, led by Gleason and Sindona, engaged in a massive real estate expansion, fraudulent statement of financial assets, foreign currency activities, and mismanagement that ultimately led to the bank's demise on October 8, 1974. When the end was near Sindona sent large sums of money overseas to recover his Franklin investment, and the bank then had insufficient capital to operate. At the time it was the largest bank failure in the history of the United States. The bank's assets and deposits were then purchased out of the receivership by European-American Bank & Trust Company.

Roth, along with his son Donald, later went on to develop the Bank of Suffolk County, in Stony Brook, New York.
