= Cuntrera-Caruana Mafia clan =

Italian Mafia clan

- Pasquale Cuntrera was arrested at Fiumicino airport near Rome in September 1992, after he was expelled from Venezuela.
- Founded: 1950s
- Founding location: Siculiana, Sicily, Italy
- Years active: 1950s–2000s
- Territory: Siculiana, Ostia, presence in Canada and Venezuela
- Ethnicity: Sicilians
- Criminal activities: Drug trafficking and money laundering
- Allies: Corleonesi; Rizzuto crime family and numerous other Sicilian Mafia families Cali Cartel; La Corporación; Corsican mafia

The Cuntrera-Caruana Mafia clan (Italian pronunciation: [kunˌtrɛrakaruˈaːna]) was a Mafia clan of the Cosa Nostra and held a key position in the illicit drug trade and money laundering for Cosa Nostra in the 1980s and 1990s. The Italian press baptized the clan as "The Rothschilds of the Mafia" or "The Bankers of Cosa Nostra".

Italian prosecutors described the Cuntrera-Caruana Mafia clan as an "international holding ... a holding which secures certain services for the Sicilian Cosa Nostra as a whole: drug-trafficking routes and channels for money laundering." The clan is "a very tight knit family group of men-of-honour, not only joined by Mafia bonds, but also by ties of blood." According to the Italian Antimafia Commission the Cuntrera-Caruana clan played a central role in international drug trafficking, extending their interests from Italy to Canada and Venezuela.

Prominent members of the clan are the brothers Liborio Cuntrera, Pasquale Cuntrera, Gaspare Cuntrera and Paolo Cuntrera. At the Caruana side there are Giuseppe Caruana, Carmelo Caruana and his son Alfonso Caruana, and Leonardo Caruana.

== Origins ==
The Cuntrera and Caruana families originated from Siculiana, a small village on the south coast of Sicily in the province of Agrigento. They are relatives; they inter-married to strengthen their criminal alliance. Mafia tradition is old in Siculiana. On a map, made in 1900 by one of the first Mafia researchers Antonino Cutrera, a former officer of public security, Siculiana is mentioned as "high density" Mafia territory. The province of Agrigento is, and has been so for the last century, the poorest and economically most backward region of Italy.

The Cuntrera-Caruana clan used to be armed guards for the local baron Agnello, who owned most of the village and the surrounding land. Everybody in the village depended on the baron for work and income. When land reform started in the 1950s the baron had to give up most of his holdings. The Mafia brokered the sale of the holdings. The power of the Mafia in those years was unchallenged, they entered the town council, and at one time the mayor was a noted mafioso.

In 1952, Pasquale Cuntrera and his brother-in-law Leonardo Caruana were indicted for a double murder, the theft of four cows and arson. Both were acquitted in 1953 per non aver commesso il fatto – not having committed the act – an almost ritual verdict where Mafia crimes were concerned in the 1950s and 1960s and 1970s.

A 1966 police report concluded Siculiana had been ruled by mafiosi for years. Giuseppe Caruana, his brother Leonardo Caruana and Pasquale Cuntrera exploited every economic activity in the village and its surrounding communities. They had created an atmosphere of omertà: through violence and intimidation they made sure that nobody dared to denounce them. The Agrigento Court decided to ban them from the village.

Some returned; however in the 1970s Leonardo Caruana became capo mandamento – after he was deported from Canada – of the area under the leadership of the Mafia boss of the province Agrigento, Giuseppe Settecasi. The power base of the clan reached into politics. The influential politician Calogero Mannino of the Christian Democrat party (DC – Democrazia Cristiana) was a witness at the marriage of Leonardo Caruana's son Gerlando in 1977 in Siculiana.

Leonardo Caruana was murdered in 1981 in front of his house in Palermo on the day his other son Gaspare Caruana married. The killing occurred at the height of a second Mafia war, and stayed unavenged.

== The expansion outside Siculiana ==
Montreal is the first base outside Sicily for the Cuntrera-Caruana clan. Canadian immigration-records show Pasquale and Liborio Cuntrera arrived in 1951 and acquired Canadian nationality in 1957. They moved up and down between Sicily and Montreal setting up base at both sides of the Atlantic. According to the Cuntrera-Caruana's own story they worked hard in Canada, starting ploughing snow and as barbers, saving enough money to start their first shop and pizzeria. However, more likely is that some of them left Sicily to escape prosecution.

In 1966, most of the clan left the village, when they were banished by court order, as a result of a crackdown by Italian police after the Ciaculli massacre. The Agrigento Court banned several members of the clan to locations elsewhere in Italy, mostly in the North, but they chose to leave the country instead. Pasquale Cuntrera and Leonardo Caruana moved to Montreal in Canada, while Giuseppe Caruana preferred Rio de Janeiro in Brazil. The Cuntrera brothers moved on to Caracas in Venezuela.

In the beginning of the 1970s the Cuntrera-Caruana clan redeployed, after Mafia persecution in Italy had slowed down. In Italy major Mafia trials ended in non-convictions for most of the Mafia bosses. Some of the clan went to the Italian mainland (Ostia Lido, a seaside resort near Rome); some went to the United Kingdom, to Woking, the stockbrokers-belt near London; some remained in Caracas; while others remained in Montreal. They travelled up and down using their residences around the world for drug trafficking.

Venezuela became an important hideout. "Venezuela has its own Cosa Nostra family as if it is Sicilian territory", according to the Italian police. "The structure and hierarchy of the Mafia has been entirely reproduced in Venezuela." The Cuntrera-Caruana clan had direct links with the ruling Commission of the Sicilian Mafia, and are acknowledged by the American Cosa Nostra.

In the Second Mafia War the Cuntrera-Caruana clan initially sided with the established Mafia-families of Palermo who were massacred by the Corleonesi headed by Salvatore Riina. However, they apparently were able to find some kind of agreement with Riina. The Cuntreras and Caruanas were necessary and irreplaceable for every other Mafia family, according to police investigators: "the others are allied with them."

== Five decades in the illicit drug trade ==
The Cuntrera-Caruana clan almost certainly was involved in heroin trafficking networks since the 1950s. Their names appeared at investigations in such famous cases as the French Connection in the 1970s and the Pizza Connection in the 1980s. Several intertwining Sicilian networks were running heroin to the US. They had the same source – suppliers from the Corsican underworld in Marseilles with their high quality laboratories – and the same destination – the North American consumer market.

The repression caused by the Ciaculli Massacre disarranged the Sicilian heroin trade to the United States. Mafiosi were banned, arrested and incarcerated. Control over the trade fell into the hands of a few fugitives: Salvatore "Ciaschiteddu" Greco, his cousin Salvatore Greco, also known as l'ingegnere, Pietro Davì, Tommaso Buscetta and Gaetano Badalamenti. All of them were acquainted with the Cuntrera-Caruana clan.

The famous "pentito" (turncoat) Tommaso Buscetta told Antimafia judge Giovanni Falcone in 1984, how he had met the clan in Montreal in 1969 during Christmas. Buscetta stayed at Pasquale Cuntrera's home recovering from a venereal disease. They were introduced to him as "uomini d'onore" – men-of-honour. When Buscetta met them they were already very rich. Pasquale Cuntrera told Buscetta they were trafficking heroin.

The Italian police finally got an idea of the role of the Cuntrera-Caruana clan in 1982–83 when they investigated the Italian end of what later was called the Pizza Connection. The Italian police was following the movements of Giuseppe Bono, the middleman between the buyers of the Gambino and Bonanno crime families in New York and the Sicilian clans who organized the heroin traffic to the US. "Almost all the money of the Sicilian Mafia in North-America to purchase heroin and the resulting proceeds went through their hands", according to a police investigator.

In 1981, Gaspare Mutolo, who would become a pentito in 1992, organized a 400 kilogram shipment of heroin to the US. The Cuntrera-Caruana clan received half of the load, while John Gambino of the Gambino Family in New York City took care of the other 200 kilograms. The shipments were financed by consortium of Sicilian Mafia clans, who had organized a pool to provide the money to buy the merchandise from Thai suppliers. The system in the heroin-business was that every Mafia-family could invest in a shipment if it had the money. The Cuntrera-Caruana clan were the trusted buyers who supplied the market in North America.

In 1985, in a joint operation of the Royal Canadian Mounted Police (RCMP) and British Customs and Excise, a heroin transport was seized in London and Montreal. Subsequent investigations revealed that the clan was picking up the heroin in Thailand since 1983. They replaced the supply line of Gaspare Mutolo who had been arrested.

In 1988 the RCMP seized a 30 kilo load of heroin at a factory owned by Cuffaro's brother-in-law in Windsor in Canada near the U.S. border. The same year Giuseppe Cuffaro and Pasquale Caruana were arrested in Germany. The German Bundeskriminalamt (BKA) discovered an extensive network that tried to set up heroin trafficking from the Far East to Europe.

== Brokering cocaine in Venezuela ==
While in Venezuela the clan started to be involved in cocaine trafficking. They became seriously involved when a joint venture of 'Ndrangheta families needed Alfonso Caruana to supply them. Caruana organized a network that smuggled eleven metric tons of cocaine to Italy from 1991–1994. Caruana brought together the cocaine suppliers of the Cali Cartel with the Italian distributors from the 'Ndrangheta in Calabria.

The pipeline fell apart when the Italian police seized 5,497 kilos of cocaine (a European record at the time) in March 1994 near Turin. A year later the Turin Prosecutors Office presented the indictment (the investigation was code-named Operation Cartagine). The operation neutralized the most important supply-line of narcotics to Europe, investigators claimed. The Cuntrera-Caruana family was labelled as "the fly-wheel of the drug trade and the indispensable link between suppliers and distributors." One of the suppliers was Henry Loaiza Ceballos of the Cali cartel.

The Caruanas moved the cocaine pipeline towards Canada, where the family took care of wholesale distribution with the consent of Vito Rizzuto the leader of the Cosa Nostra, who came from the same region in Sicily as the Cuntrera-Caruanas.

== Arrests and convictions ==
Just before he was killed by the Mafia, judge Giovanni Falcone warned of the international connections of Cosa Nostra. He initiated extradition requests for the Cuntrera-Caruana members in Venezuela. After the killing of the judges Falcone and Paolo Borsellino the Italian authorities stepped up prosecution. Pasquale, Paolo and Gaspare Cuntrera were arrested in September 1992 on Fiumicino airport (Rome), after they had been expelled from Venezuela. Their expulsion was ordered by a commission of the Venezuelan Senate headed by Senator Cristobal Fernandez Dalo and his money laundering investigator, Thor Halvorssen Hellum.

In 1993, the Italian Corriere della Sera reported that the Cuntrera-Caruana clan owned 60 per cent of the Caribbean island Aruba, part of the Kingdom of the Netherlands through investments in hotels, casinos and the election-campaign of Prime Minister Henny Eman. According to the newspaper, Aruba had become set to be the first independent mafia state. That claim proved to be exaggerated, however.

In May 1998 the sentences were confirmed by the Supreme Court of Cassation: Pasquale Cuntrera was convicted to 20 years in prison, Gaspare and Paolo Cuntrera to 15 years. However, due to an error in communication about expiration of provisional incarceration terms, Pasquale Cuntrera had been able to leave prison two weeks before. When Cuntrera's getaway was reported in the news media, the opposition asked for the resignation of the minister Justice, Giovanni Maria Flick, and the minister of Internal Affairs, Giorgio Napolitano. Flick offered his resignation but that was refused by Prime minister Romano Prodi. Pasquale Cuntrera was arrested some days later in Fuengirola, Spain, while he was waiting for arrangements to travel to Venezuela; Pasquale Cuntrera was extradited to Italy to serve the 20 year prison sentence.

=== Events in Canada ===
On July 15, 1998, Alfonso Caruana and his brothers Gerlando and Pasquale Caruana were arrested in Woodbridge, Ontario, in a Royal Canadian Mounted Police (RCMP) operation called Project Omerta, for importing and trafficking cocaine to Canada. In February 2000, Alfonso pleaded guilty to charges of importing and trafficking narcotics, and was sentenced to 18 years in prison by the Ontario Superior Court. Pasquale and Gerlando were also given 10 and 18 year prison sentences respectively.

In June 2007, the Ontario Court of Appeal ruled Alfonso Caruana to be sent back to Italy to face jail time. On December 20, 2007, Caruana's efforts to appeal were dismissed by the Supreme Court of Canada. He was extradited to Italy on January 29, 2008, to serve the nearly 22-year prison sentence that was presented in absentia in 1997.

Agostino Cuntrera, cousin of Alfonso, and presumed acting boss who was believed to have taken control of the Rizzuto crime family, was killed together with his bodyguard in Saint Leonard, Quebec, on 30 June 2010.

A house owned by Giuseppe Cuntrera ("Big Joe") in Woodbridge was targeted by unknown culprits in 2017. A Molotov cocktail was thrown into the Di Manno Bakery in Vaughan on June 12, and gunshots struck the door of his home on the same night. The garage of the same house was struck by gunshots on August 7 and a significant fire occurred at the home, then unoccupied, in late August.
