= Alfonso Caruana =

Italian Mafia member

- Born: 1 January 1946 (age 80); Castelvetrano, Sicily, Kingdom of Italy
- Other name: "Boss of two worlds"
- Citizenship: Canadian
- Occupation: Crime boss
- Spouse: Giuseppina Caruana
- Children: 3
- Allegiance: Cuntrera-Caruana Mafia clan
- Convictions: Mafia association, conspiracy to traffic narcotics and aggravated importing, possession and sale of large quantities of narcotics (1997); Importing and trafficking narcotics (2000)
- Penalty: 21 years and 10 months imprisonment 18 years imprisonment

Alfonso Caruana (Italian: [alˈfɔnso karuˈaːna]; born 1 January 1946) is an Italian-Canadian crime boss and member of the Sicilian Mafia who was the head of the Sicilian Cuntrera-Caruana Mafia clan's branch in Canada.

In 1997, he was sentenced in absentia in Italy, on several charges, to nearly 22 years in prison. In 1998, the Royal Canadian Mounted Police (RCMP) amassed enough evidence, and Caruana was arrested at his Woodbridge, Ontario, home. In 2000, he was sentenced to 18 years in prison by the Ontario Superior Court, but in 2008, was extradited to Italy to serve his sentence.

== Early life ==
Caruana was born in Castelvetrano in the province of Trapani, Sicily. His family originated from Siculiana in the province of Agrigento and is closely related to the Cuntrera family through several marriages. Alfonso Caruana married his cousin Giuseppina Caruana and has a son and two daughters.

== Mafia career ==
In 1968, Alfonso Caruana arrived in Montreal, Quebec, Canada, with $100 in his pocket pretending to be an electrician. Ten years later, he was stopped at the international airport of Zürich, Switzerland with $600,000 in a suitcase. He was released after paying a fee.

When the Caruanas and Cuntreras moved to Montreal in the mid-1960s, they became affiliated with Nicolo Rizzuto and his son, Vito Rizzuto. They began to work together in drug trafficking activities.

In the 1970s, Caruana, together with his brothers Gerlando Caruana and Pasquale Caruana left Montreal for Caracas in Venezuela due to the conflict with the Cotroni crime family. In 1978, Cotroni family boss Paolo Violi was killed, and they returned to Canada; the Rizzuto crime family subsequently took over. Caruana also acquired Canadian citizenship in 1978.

At the beginning of the 1980s, Alfonso established himself near Lugano in a luxurious villa, supervising the laundering of the proceeds of heroin-trafficking. The funds were deposited in Canadian banks and channelled through Swiss bank accounts. Two years later he moved to the stockbroker belt near London. From his £450,000 mansion, he supervised a heroin pipeline from Thailand, through England, to Canada. His partner in the UK was Francesco Di Carlo. Caruana went to Thailand to set up the route. When the pipeline was dismantled in England in 1985, he managed to escape arrest, moving back to a Montreal suburb where he opened a pizzeria. Alfonso prepared the pizzas while his wife tended the pay-desk.

According to Di Carlo, who became a pentito (state witness) in 1996, Caruana was sentenced to death by Sicilian Mafia Commission in the early stages of the Second Mafia War. His brother Leonardo was killed on 2 September 1981 on the order of Totò Riina. Di Carlo was ordered to carry out the killing of Alfonso Caruana and Pasquale Cuntrera, but refused, which resulted in Di Carlo's suspension from the organization.

=== Cocaine trafficker ===
Meanwhile, Caruana organised a network that smuggled eleven metric tonnes of cocaine to Italy from 1991 until 1994. Caruana brought together the cocaine producers of the Colombian cartels with the Italian distributors, six 'Ndrangheta families from Calabria. At the time, the Cuntrera-Caruana family was labelled as "the fly-wheel of the drug trade and the indispensable link between suppliers and distributors".

The investigation, code-named Operation Cartagine, started when the police seized 5,497 kilos of cocaine (a European record at the time) in March 1994 in Turin. A year later, the Turin Prosecutors Office presented the indictment. The operation neutralized the most important supply line of narcotics to Europe, investigators claimed.

=== Later years and convictions ===
In March 1995, Caruana filed for bankruptcy after declaring $250 worth of assets following a notice of assessment from Revenue Canada to pay $8.6 million in unpaid taxes, plus accrued interest and various penalties amounting to $21.2 million. In early 1997, Revenue Canada took him to Quebec Superior Court in Montreal to challenge his bankruptcy claims. Caruana claimed to be a carwash attendant who made $400 per week, however, had Swiss bank accounts in his name, through which $21 million was moved; he claimed most of the money belonged to his uncle Pasquale Cuntrera. Revenue Canada was unsuccessful in recovering the amounts due, as Caruana was officially bankrupt on paper; he was ordered to pay a mere $90,000 over a three-year period.

Caruana was sentenced in absentia on 30 July 1997, by the Palermo court of appeal to 21 years and 10 months for Mafia association, conspiracy to traffic narcotics and aggravated importing, possession and sale of large quantities of narcotics for his involvement in heroin trafficking in the 1980s. At the same time, he was prosecuted in Turin for cocaine trafficking in the 1990s. The Palermo court concluded that the network was "a further indication of the high criminal capability" of Caruana who had "escaped every judicial initiative during the last decades and succeeded in reaching the top of the international drug trade, adjusting his criminal contacts and showing such skill that he is to be considered as one of the most important exponents in this sector."

In July 1998, after the Royal Canadian Mounted Police (RCMP) amassed enough evidence from surveillance and wiretaps on Caruana's home through Project Omerta, he was arrested at his Woodbridge, Ontario home, where police also found large amounts of hidden cash and jewellery.

According to police, he controlled one of the largest drug-dealing networks in the world. The officer in charge of the investigation, RCMP Chief Superintendent Ben Soave, said: "If organized crime were a hockey game, Mr. Caruana would be [Wayne] Gretzky." In February 2000, after associate Oreste Pagano testified against Caruana, Caruana pleaded guilty to charges of importing and trafficking narcotics, and was sentenced to 18 years in prison by the Ontario Superior Court. Alfonso's brothers, Pasquale and Gerlando Caruana were also arrested in the Project, receiving 10 and 18-year prison sentences respectively. In July 2004, Caruana was denied bail.

In June 2007, the Ontario Court of Appeal ruled that Caruana be extradited to Italy to face prison time. On 20 December 2007, Caruana's efforts to appeal were dismissed by the Supreme Court of Canada, and was extradited to Italy on 29 January 2008, to serve a nearly 22-year prison sentence.

In 2019, Caruana was convicted of running a cocaine trafficking and money laundering empire between Italy and North America, and after the Supreme Court of Cassation dismissed his appeal in November 2020, he faces an additional 17 years in prison.
