= Giovanni Bontade =

Member of the Sicilian Mafia (1946–1988)

- Born: 1946; Palermo, Italy
- Died: September 28, 1988 (aged 41–42); Palermo, Italy
- Cause of death: Murdered
- Spouse: Francesca Citarda
- Parent: Francesco Paolo Bontade
- Relatives: Stefano Bontade (brother)
- Status: Deceased
- Allegiance: Sicilian Mafia
- Criminal charges: Mafia association

Giovanni Bontade (1946 in Palermo – September 28, 1988 in Palermo) was a member of the Sicilian Mafia. He was commonly called Bontade but the actual surname is Bontate. He was the brother of Mafia boss Stefano Bontade, who ruled the Santa Maria di Gesù Mafia Family in Palermo and second son of Francesco Paolo Bontade.

== Biography ==
He went to university and studied to become a lawyer, but remained an important figure within the organization and, according to several pentiti, became jealous when his brother Stefano inherited control of the family after their father's death. When Stefano was murdered in 1981 by the Corleonesi in the Second Mafia War, some suspected Giovanni had "sold his brother" to Salvatore Riina in exchange for control over the Santa Maria di Gesù family. However, the Corleonesi initially put him aside and instead temporarily gave control of the family to another mafioso, Pietro Lo Iacono.

During the Maxi Trial of 1986-1987, Bontade denied all accusations said against him by Tommaso Buscetta, but also attempted to defend Cosa Nostra from the accusation of the murder of Claudio Domino, an 11-year-old boy. This decision however had the unwanted side effect of confirming the existence of the organization: as procurator Pietro Grasso explained, "With Bontade's appeal, for the first time a mafioso pronounced the word 'we': we, meaning we Cosa Nostra. They had just admitted their own existence. It was the first time a non-pentito had done so."

Following this incident, the Corleonesi decided to eliminate Bontade, who was killed together with his wife Francesca Citarda by his own lieutenant Pietro Aglieri in September 1988. Following his death, Aglieri became the new leader of Bontade's Mafia faction.

Several years later, during a confrontation between pentito Gaspare Mutolo and Salvatore Riina, Mutolo stated that the slaying of Bontade's wife, who was not involved in the Mafia and thus an innocent, was part of what motivated him to turn against the Corleonesi and become a state witness.
