= Piersanti Mattarella =

Italian politician (1935–1980)

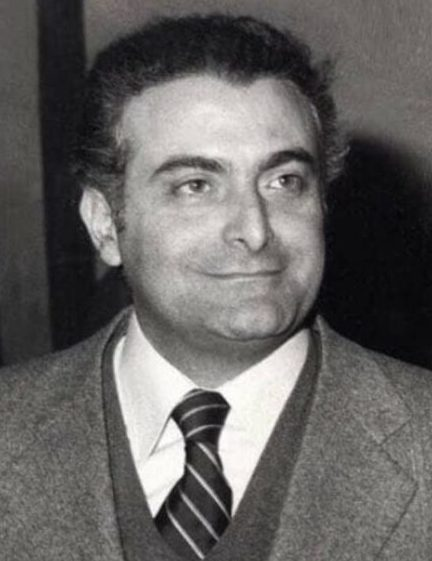

12th President of Sicily
- In office 20 March 1978 – 6 January 1980
- Preceded by: Angelo Bonfiglio
- Succeeded by: Mario D'Acquisto

Member of the Sicilian Regional Assembly
- In office 11 July 1967 – 6 January 1980
- Constituency: Palermo

Personal details
- Born: 24 May 1935 Castellammare del Golfo, Sicily, Kingdom of Italy
- Died: 6 January 1980 (aged 44) Palermo, Sicily, Italy
- Cause of death: Assassination
- Party: Christian Democracy
- Spouse: Irma Chiazzese (m. 1958)
- Children: 2
- Parents: Bernardo Mattarella (father); Maria Buccellato (mother)
- Relatives: Sergio Mattarella (brother); Laura Mattarella (niece)
- Education: University of Palermo
- Profession: Politician

Piersanti Mattarella (Italian pronunciation: [ˌpjɛrˈsanti mattaˈrɛlla]; 24 May 1935 – 6 January 1980) was an Italian politician who was assassinated by the Mafia while he held the position of President of the Regional Government of Sicily. A member of the Christian Democracy, he was the older brother of Sergio Mattarella, who has been president of Italy since 2015.

== Background and early career ==
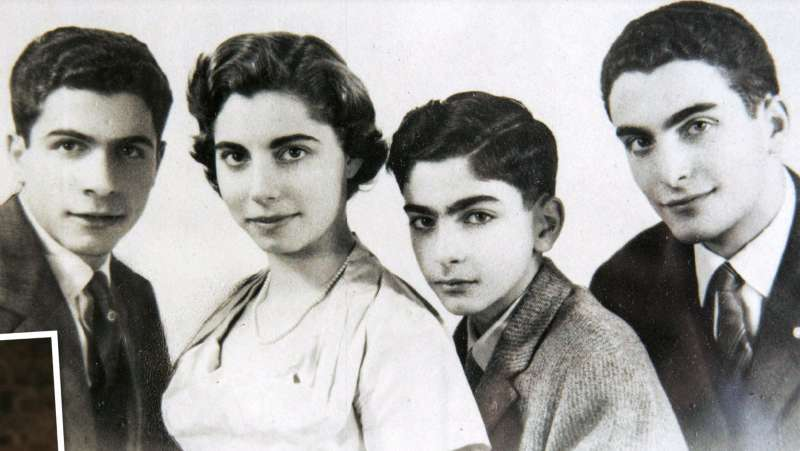
Piersanti Mattarella (first from the right) next to his younger brother Sergio and his other siblings in the early 1950s

Mattarella was born in Castellammare del Golfo, in the province of Trapani, Sicily. He was the son of Bernardo Mattarella, a member of Christian Democracy (DC), and a leading political boss in Sicily in the 1950s. The power network his father had created benefited his initial political career.

He received a Catholic-oriented education by the Jesuits. In 1960, he became a national leader of Azione Cattolica, and subsequently became an important regional member of DC. Inspired by the politics of Giorgio La Pira, he adhered to the more progressive approach of national leader Aldo Moro. In 1967, he became a deputy to the Regional Parliament of Sicily, a position he held until 1978, when he was elected President of Sicily.

== Death ==
Two years later, on 6 January 1980, he was killed by the Mafia in Palermo. Initially believed to be an act of neo-fascist terrorism, his assassination was spurred by his strong commitment against the relationships of numerous Sicilian politicians (mostly members of DC itself) with the Mafia. While in office, Mattarella had decided to launch a moral renewal of the Sicilian Christian Democracy. He wanted to clean up the government's public contracts racket that benefited Cosa Nostra, passing a law enforcing the same building standards used in the rest of Italy, thereby making the Mafia's building schemes illegal.

He soon became much more isolated politically. The inspector Mattarella had asked to investigate public contracts in Palermo, Raimondo Mignosi, recalled the air of intimidation at the time: "I told him to be careful because I ran the risk of ending up in a cement block, at which he replied, 'That's not true, I'll end up in cement.' To break the tension, we jokingly agreed that we would both end up in cement blocks side by side."

== Political involvement in murder ==
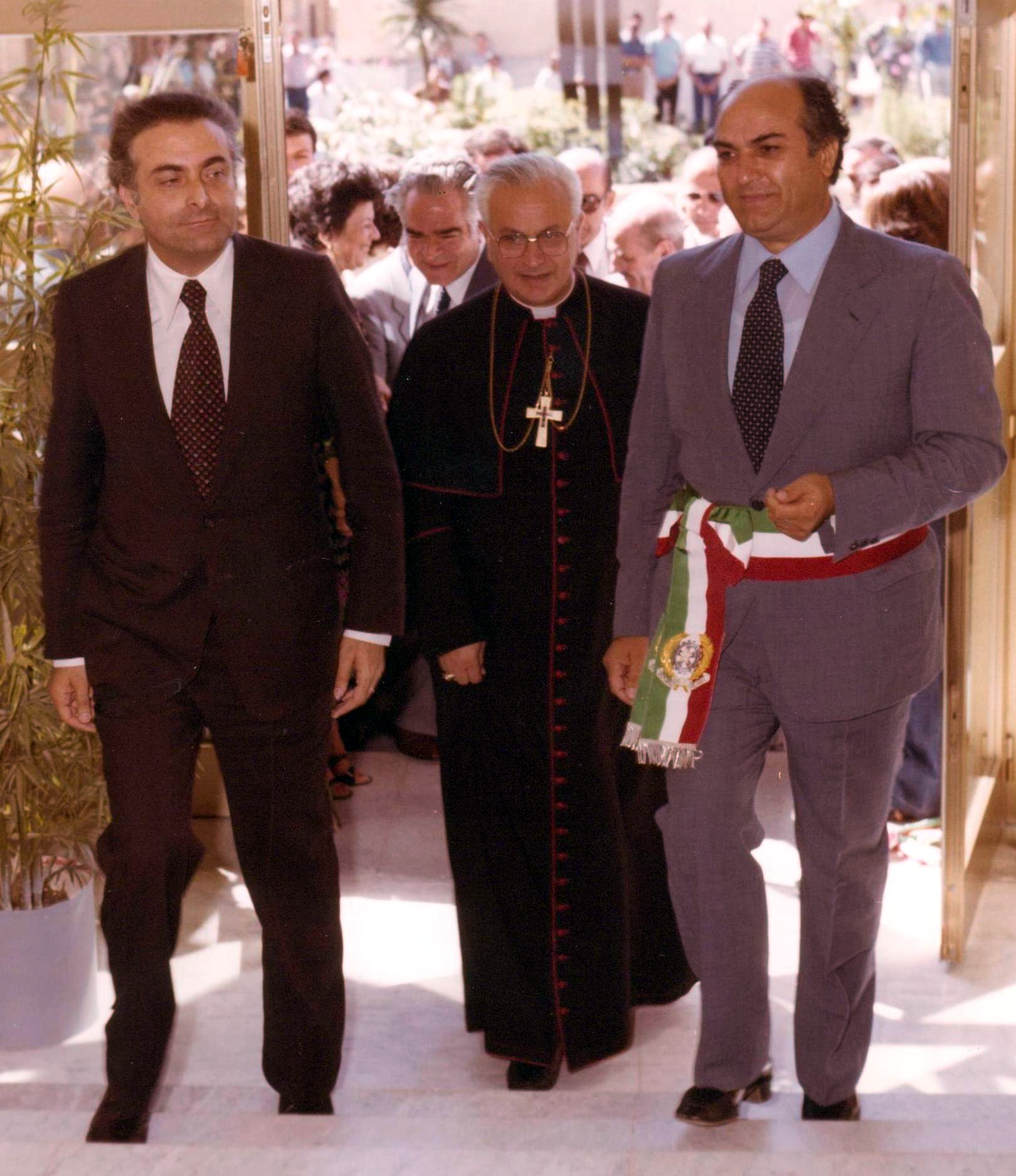
Mattarella in Catenanuova, 1979

The Mafia used its contacts with forthcoming Sicilian Christian Democratic politicians such as Salvo Lima and the Salvo cousins to complain to former prime minister Giulio Andreotti about the behaviour of Mattarella, according to Mafia turncoat (pentito) Francesco Marino Mannoia. Andreotti contacted Mafia boss Stefano Bontade to try to prevent the Mafia from killing Piersanti Mattarella. Bontade and other Mafiosi felt betrayed by Mattarella, who used to be responsive to their interests (his father Bernardo Mattarella was rumoured to be associated with the Mafia).

Andreotti's attempt failed. After the murder of Mattarella, Andreotti again contacted Bontade and Salvatore Inzerillo to try to straighten things out. Andreotti and Lima allegedly arrived at the meeting in a bullet-proof Alfa Romeo belonging to the Salvo cousins. He had come to protest the killing. However, according to Marino Mannoia, Bontade told Andreotti: "We are in charge in Sicily and, unless you want the whole DC cancelled out, you do as we say." When Andreotti's aide Franco Evangelisti asked Lima about what had happened, Lima replied: "When agreements are struck, they have to be kept".

== Trials ==
According to Marino Mannoia, Mattarella's killers were Salvatore Federico, Francesco Davì, Santo Inzerillo, and Antonio Rotolo, while the principals were on the Sicilian Mafia Commission at the time: Bontade and Inzerillo, Michele Greco, Salvatore Riina, Bernardo Provenzano, Antonino Geraci, Francesco Madonia, Pippo Calò, and Bernardo Brusca. On 12 April 1995, they were sentenced to life imprisonment.

Acting as an accomplice in the Mattarella assassination was also one of the charges against Andreotti in his trial for collusion with the Mafia. The court established that Andreotti had indeed had strong ties to the Mafia until 1980 and used them to further his political career so much that his position could be considered a component of the Mafia itself. However, the judges decided to uphold Andreotti's original acquittal on the grounds that the statute of limitations for conspiracy had expired because he had cut all ties with the Mafia in 1980 precisely out of disgust with Mattarella's murder and his inability to stop it.

== Legacy ==
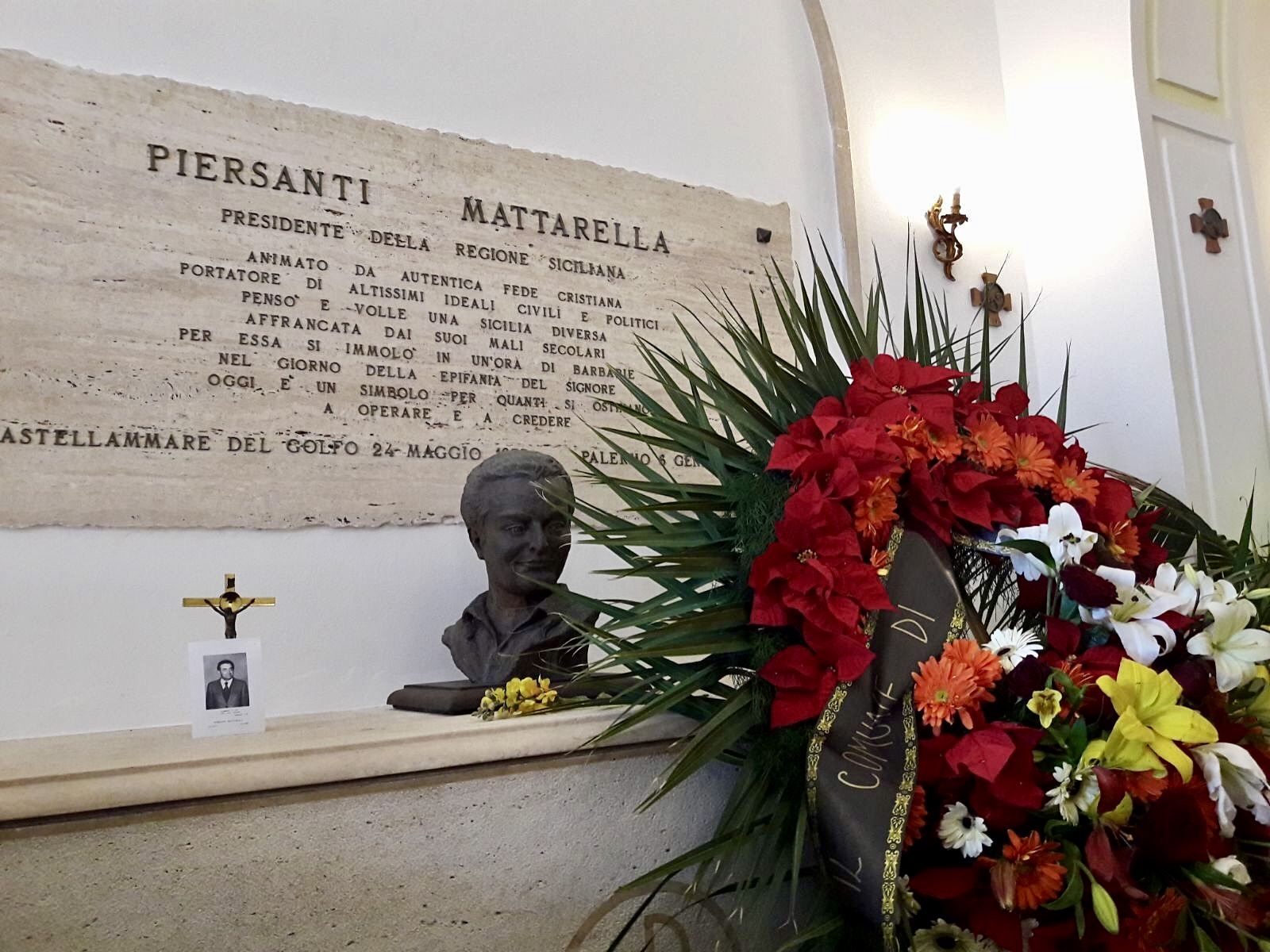
Mattarella's grave in Castellammare del Golfo

According to Leoluca Orlando, former mayor of Palermo for the DC and Antimafia activist, who had been a legal adviser to Mattarella, the rumours about his father and his party's experiences with the Mafia were probably responsible for Piersanti's aspiration to clean the Christian Democrat party of any such connections.

The Italian national Anti-mafia Prosecutor, Piero Grasso, said that Mattarella was killed because "he was trying to accomplish a new political and administrative project, a true revolution, which, through a big change in the management of the Region, aimed at breaking well-established relations between bureaucracy, politics, business and the mafia. His policy of radical moralization of public life, based on the idea that Sicily needed to present itself with 'the papers in order', had upset the system of public procurement, with stunning moves, never seen before in the Island". Judge Giancarlo Caselli, Chief Prosecutor in Palermo for many years, described Mattarella as an "honest and courageous Christian Democrat, killed just because he was honest and courageous".

His younger brother, Sergio Mattarella, was first elected as president of the Italian Republic in February 2015, and was reelected for a second seven-year term in 2022.

== See also ==
- List of victims of the Sicilian Mafia

== Sources ==
- Dickie, John (2004). Cosa Nostra. A history of the Sicilian Mafia, London: Coronet, ISBN 0-340-82435-2
- Ginsborg, Paul (2003). Italy and Its Discontents, London: Palgrave Macmillan ISBN 1-4039-6152-2 (Review Institute of Historical Research | Review New York Times)
- Grasso, Piero (2009). Per non morire di mafia, Sperling & Kupfer, ISBN
- Orlando, Leoluca (2003). Fighting the Mafia and Renewing Sicilian Culture, New York: Encounter Books, ISBN 1-893554-81-3
- Schneider, Jane T. & Peter T. Schneider (2003). Reversible Destiny: Mafia, Antimafia, and the Struggle for Palermo, Berkeley: University of California Press ISBN 0-520-23609-2
- Stille, Alexander (1995). Excellent Cadavers. The Mafia and the Death of the First Italian Republic, New York: Vintage ISBN 0-09-959491-9
