= Ignazio and Nino Salvo =

Members of the Sicilian Mafia

Nino Salvo

Ignazio Salvo (pronounced [iɲˈɲattsjo ˈsalvo]; 27 May 1931 – 17 September 1992) and his cousin Nino Salvo (born Antonino Salvo, pronounced [(anto)ˈniːno ˈsalvo]; 14 July 1929 – 19 January 1986) were two wealthy businessmen from the town of Salemi in the Italian province of Trapani. They had strong political connections with the Christian Democracy party (Democrazia Cristiana, DC), in particular with the former mayor of Palermo, Salvo Lima, and Giulio Andreotti. At the Maxi Trial against the Sicilian Mafia in the mid-1980s, they were convicted of association with Mafia members.

Salvo Lima arranged an unusually lucrative concession to collect taxes in Sicily for the Salvo cousins' island (tax collection was contracted out by the government), in exchange for their loyalty to Lima and the Andreotti faction of the DC. The Salvos were allowed 10 percent of the take – three times as much as the national average of 3.3 per cent. Subsequently, the Salvos expanded their economic activity to many other areas such as agribusiness (lavishly subsidised by the European Union and Italian government) and tourism. They owned the Zagarella Hotel complex in Santa Flavia, near Palermo.

== Rise to power ==
In 1958, the Salvo cousins as well as the old Mafia families of Greco and Bontade backed the regional Sicilian government of Silvio Milazzo, an atypical coalition government that was supported by the Italian Communist Party, the Monarchist National Party, the Italian Social Movement, and dissident Christian Democrats. The government was formed in protest against infringement on Sicilian autonomy and the threat to Sicilian patronage by the DC party headquarters in Rome. During that time, they acquired the private concession for collecting taxes in Sicily under extremely favourable conditions. To consolidate the privilege, the Salvos unscrupulously withdrew their support for Milazzo to ally themselves with the mainstream Christian Democrats which tried to regain control of the region to maintain their cliental power base.

From then until the mid-1980s, the Salvos were among the most powerful businessmen in the economic, political and social life of Sicily – until they were prosecuted by Palermo’s Antimafia pool that included Giovanni Falcone and Paolo Borsellino. They controlled the Christian Democratic party branch in the Province of Trapani that guaranteed them great influence over the regional decision making of the DC. Mafia boss Francesco Paolo Bontade and, later, his son Stefano Bontade sustained a close relationship with the Salvo cousins, which allowed them access to influential regional and even national politicians.

== Intermediaries between Mafia and politicians ==
The Salvo cousins acted as the intermediaries between the Mafia and its political counterparts. Italy’s highest court, the Court of Cassation, ruled in October 2004 that until the beginning of the 1980s former Prime Minister Giulio Andreotti had "friendly and even direct ties" with top men in the so-called moderate wing of Cosa Nostra, Gaetano Badalamenti and Stefano Bontade, favoured by the connection between them and Salvo Lima through the Salvos. The judges considered that Andreotti had ‘underestimated’ the dangers posed by his proven contact with the Salvo cousins and Mafia boss, Stefano Bontade, before 1980.

The Salvos were the main contact to 'adjust' trials against mafiosi. "The 'normal circuit' for all problems that needed attention in Rome was: Ignazio Salvo, the Honourable Salvo Lima, and Senator Giulio Andreotti," according to the pentito Gaspare Mutolo. Andreotti always denied having known the Salvos. However, old news photographs are showing Andreotti with Nino Salvo at a Christian Democratic rally held in the Salvos' Zagarella Hotel complex in 1979.

== Mafia affiliation ==
Front page of the newspaper L'Ora about the arrest of the Salvo cousins

It was the pentito Tommaso Buscetta who revealed the affiliation of the Salvos to Cosa Nostra to judge Giovanni Falcone. However, in a confidential police report from 1972 about the Mafia in Trapani, the brothers Ignazio Salvo (born in 1887 and the father of Antonino Salvo) and Luigi Salvo (born in 1888 and the father of Ignazio Salvo) were indicated as the Mafia bosses of that area. The membership of Cosa Nostra was passed on to their sons.

Antonino and Ignazio Salvo were arrested on 12 November 1984, and later convicted of Mafia association. It came out at their trial that when Lima was in Sicily, he was chauffeured around in the Salvos' bulletproof car. Later, pentiti explained even more about the Salvos' role as intermediaries between Cosa Nostra and politicians.

According to pentito Francesco Marino Mannoia, his boss Stefano Bontade told him that the affiliation of the Salvo cousins should be kept confidential because of their position in business and politics. Contact with the Salvos was maintained by a restricted group of Mafia bosses, such as Gaetano Badalamenti, Salvatore Inzerillo and Bontade. After the murder of Bontade and the defeat of the moderate wing of Cosa Nostra in the Mafia war waged by the Corleonesi in the beginning of the 1980s, the relation with the Salvos was taken over by Salvatore Riina. Although the Salvos were part of the losing side, their political connections were too important to have them killed.

The Salvo cousins were also involved in the murder of Mino Pecorelli on 20 March 1979. On 6 April 1993, Mafia turncoat Tommaso Buscetta told Palermo prosecutors that he had learnt from his boss Badalamenti that Pecorelli's murder had been carried out in the interest of Giulio Andreotti. Buscetta testified that Gaetano Badalamenti told him that the murder had been commissioned by the Salvo cousins as a favor to Andreotti. Andreotti was allegedly afraid that Pecorelli was about to publish information that could have destroyed his political career. Among the information was the complete memoirs of Aldo Moro, which would be published only in 1990 and which Pecorelli had shown to General Carlo Alberto Dalla Chiesa before his death. Dalla Chiesa was also assassinated by Mafia in September 1982.

According to pentito Francesco Marino Mannoia, the Salvos were present at a meeting with Giulio Andreotti and Mafia boss Stefano Bontade to try to prevent the Mafia from killing Piersanti Mattarella, the president of the autonomous region of Sicily. Mattarella wanted to clean up the government's public contracts racket that benefited Cosa Nostra. Mattarella was killed on 6 January 1980.

== Decline ==
Antonino Salvo died of cancer on 19 January 1986 in a clinic in Bellinzona in Switzerland. Ignazio Salvo was sentenced to seven years in prison for criminal conspiracy on 16 December 1987, at the Maxi Trial against the Mafia. He was described as a key mediator between the Mafia and Sicily's political and business elite.

On 17 September 1992, the Mafia murdered Ignazio Salvo outside his home in Santa Flavia. He was a victim in a series of murders staged by the Mafia in retaliation for the confirmation of the sentence of the Maxi Trial by the Italian Supreme Court in January 1992. In 1996, Giovanni Brusca was sentenced in absentia to a life sentence for the murder of Ignazio Salvo.

The Salvos' ally Salvo Lima had been killed in March 1992, while their adversaries, the judges Giovanni Falcone and Paolo Borsellino had been killed in May and July 1992.

In 1993, when prosecutors in Palermo indicted Andreotti, the police searched the archives of photojournalist Letizia Battaglia and found two 1979 photographs of Andreotti with Nino Salvo, whom he had denied knowing. Aside from the accounts of turncoats, these pictures were the only physical evidence of this powerful politician's connections to the Sicilian Mafia. Battaglia herself had forgotten having taken the photograph. Its potential significance was apparent only 15 years after it was taken.
