= Franklin National Bank =

Historic commercial building in New York, United States

- Franklin Square National Bank
- U.S. National Register of Historic Places
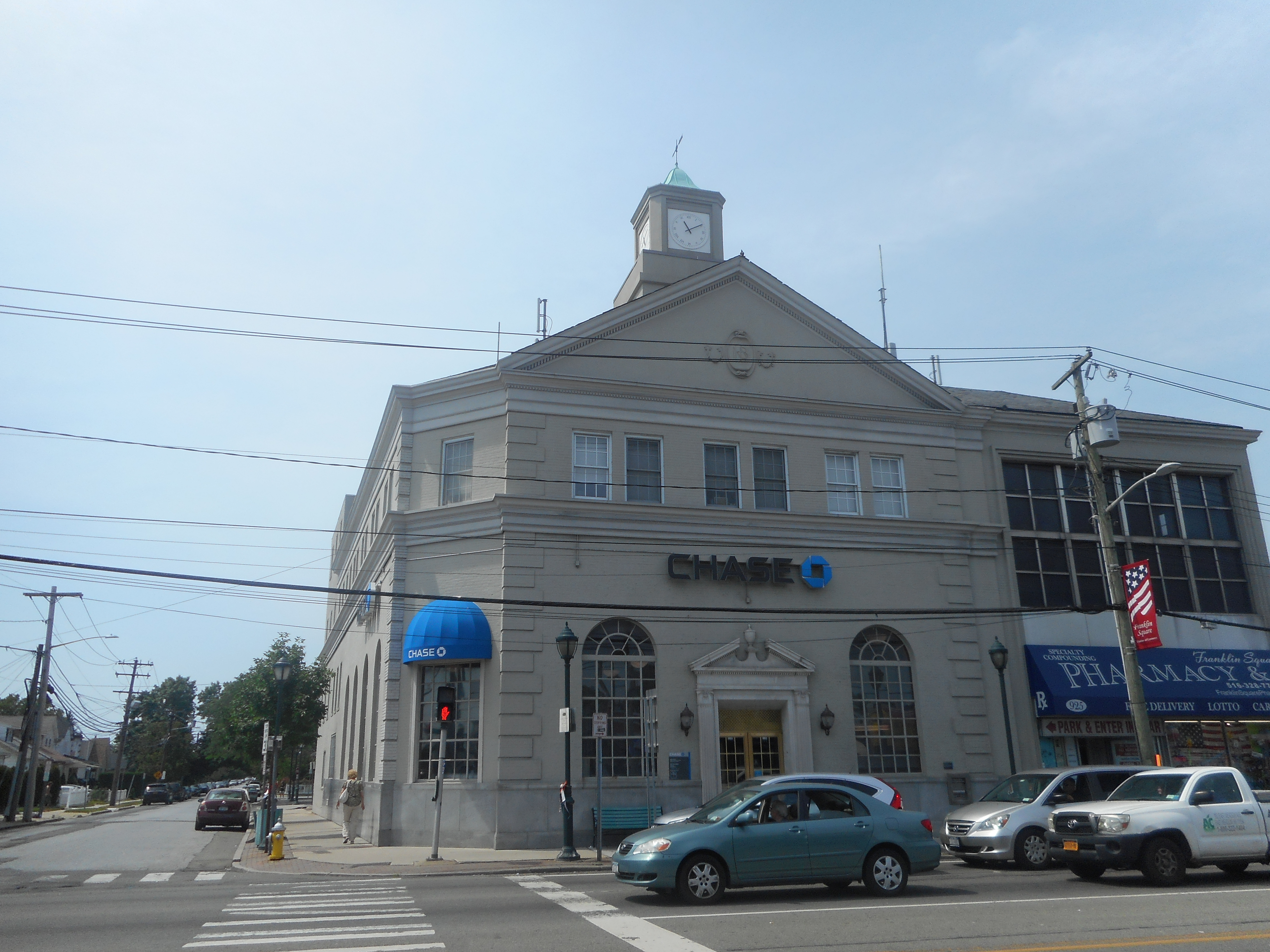
- The original headquarters for Franklin National Bank on Hempstead Turnpike (NY 24) and James Street in Franklin Square, New York

- Location within New York Location within the United States
- Location: 925 Hempstead Turnpike, Franklin Square, New York
- Coordinates: 40°42′27″N 73°40′39″W
- Area: 0.35 acres (0.14 ha)
- Built: c. 1929-1955
- Architectural style: Colonial Revival
- NRHP reference No.: 15000776
- Added to NRHP: November 10, 2015

Franklin National Bank was a bank based in Franklin Square on Long Island, New York. It was once the United States' 20th largest bank. On October 8, 1974, it collapsed in obscure circumstances involving Michele Sindona, who was a renowned Mafia-banker and member of the irregular freemasonic lodge Propaganda Due. It was at the time the largest bank failure in the history of the country.

== History ==
The bank was founded as Franklin Square National Bank in 1926 and changed its name to Franklin National Bank in 1947. Its original location was built in 1929 in Franklin Square, a suburban hamlet in Nassau County. It was subsequently expanded in stages through 1955. It consists of the original 1929 one-story Colonial Revival style building; a 1939 expansion; a 1946/47 expansion which included the addition of a second floor, pediment, partial hipped roof, cupola, rear four-story addition and a two-story banking hall; and a 1955 four-story rear office addition and drive-through teller. The building remained the bank's headquarters until 1960, when a new headquarters was built about 4 miles away in Mineola, New York, the county seat. The building was listed on the National Register of Historic Places in 2015.

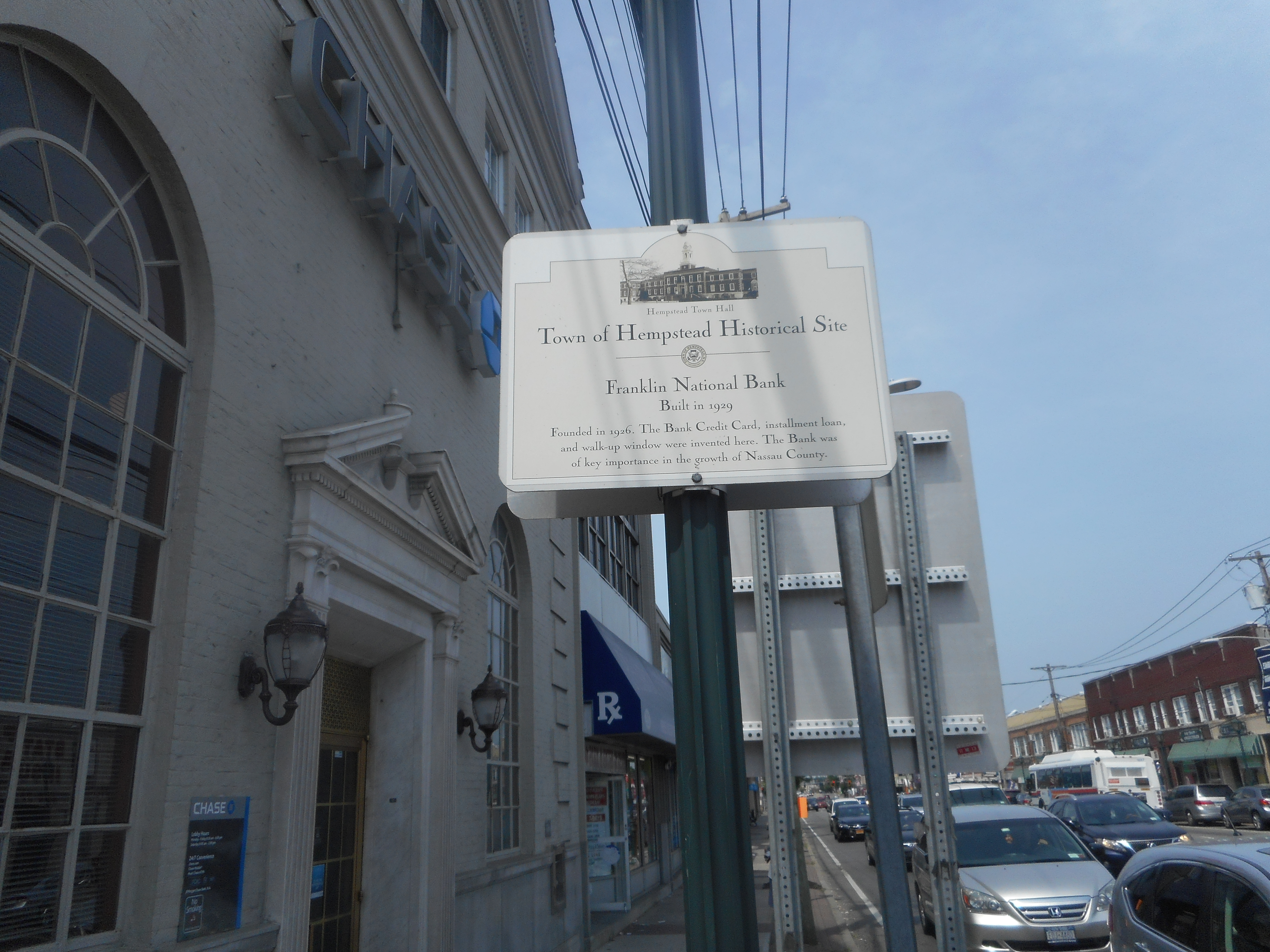
Town of Hempstead sign recognizing the historic significance of the bank.

Arthur T. Roth joined the bank in 1934 as head teller and became president in 1946. Under his leadership, Franklin National Bank introduced many banking innovations, including junior savings accounts (1947), the drive-up teller window (1950), the bank credit card (1951), a no-smoking policy on banking floors (1958), and outdoor teller machines at branch banks (1968) – along with the Franklin Savings Bond, which later developed into the Certificate of Deposit (1969).

In 1955, Franklin National Bank acquired the Roslyn National Bank and Trust Company and the First National Bank of Glen Cove.

In 1964, Franklin opened branch offices in New York City, and in 1967 merged with Federation Bank & Trust Company. In 1968, Roth was removed as CEO by his protégé, Harold Gleason, after an alleged conflict of interest real estate scandal involving Donald Roth and the proposed airfield development at Calverton, New York. Importantly, the bank had several branches on the Bahamas and other tax havens before 1971. In 1970, Roth lost his position as Chairman and was pushed off the board of directors in favor of an influential future promised by Michele Sindona. Gleason then became chairman and chief executive officer, inviting Laurence Tisch to join as vice chairman as he was a 22% shareholder.

== Collapse ==
In 1972, Michele Sindona, a banker with close ties to the Mafia, the masonic lodge P2, and the Nixon administration, purchased a controlling interest in Long Island's Franklin National Bank from Laurence Tisch, Chairman of Loews Corporation, which owned hotels in Italy. Later the U.S. Comptroller of the Currency declared Tisch an unqualified director for reasons of conflict of interest, paving the way for Sindona to take over Franklin. Sindona paid more than Tisch had paid for the stock. Tisch was later sued by the Federal Deposit Insurance Corporation (FDIC) for breach of fiduciary duty with respect to the sale of his shares to Sindona. Tisch had bought the shares in a gradual accumulation as a favor for Sindona. It would appear the sudden need to sell the shares and Sindona sitting in the wings allowed the purchase of shares by Sindona to appear as a golden angel to the rescue. Harold Gleason orchestrated the situation by appointing Tisch as a board member, creating the conflict of interest circumstance which would allow Tisch to make the sale to Sindona for other than investment quality reasons. Neither the Comptroller of the Currency, the FDIC, or the Securities and Exchange Commission showed any interest in the matter.

As a result of his acquisition of a controlling stake in Franklin, Sindona finally had a money laundering operation to aid his ties to Vatican Bank and the Sicilian drug cartel. Sindona used the bank's ability to transfer funds, produce letters of credit, and trade in foreign currencies to begin building a banking empire in the U.S. Allegedly Sindona used his influence in the Republican Party and the Nixon administration to ensure that his background did not inhibit his ability to become vice chairman and largest stockholder in the bank. Unfortunately Sindona began to suffer huge losses in the foreign exchange markets, and decided to defraud the bank of $30,000,000 to cover his losses, which brought the bank below its capital needs to operate. In mid-1974, management revealed huge losses, and depositors started taking out large withdrawals, causing the bank to have to borrow over $1 billion from the Federal Reserve Bank. On October 8, 1974, the bank was declared insolvent due to mismanagement and fraud, involving losses in foreign currency speculation and poor loan policies.

In 1975, Peter Shaddick, the former executive vice-chairman of the bank's international division, pleaded guilty to fraud. Following their 1979 trial in Federal District Court in New York, Gleason, Paul Luftig, the bank's former president and chief administrative officer, and J. Michael Carter, a former senior vice president, were convicted of falsifying financial records. The Italian lawyer and liquidator of Sindona's Italian financial empire, Giorgio Ambrosoli, provided the US Justice Department with evidence to convict Sindona for his role in the collapse of the Bank. Ambrosoli was killed by a Mafia hitman commissioned by Sindona in July 1979.

In 1980, "mysterious Michele" was convicted in the United States and in 1984 was extradited to Italy. In March 1986, he died of cyanide poisoning while serving a life sentence. Some sources indicate he was murdered, while others indicate he committed suicide. Murder could have been by actors in revenge for Sindona's alleged, but until now still unproven, murder of Pope John Paul I. Others say there was fear that old men in jail talk as they contemplate their doom. Franklin's assets were later purchased by European American Bank, itself later acquired by Citigroup.
