= Michele Sindona =

Italian banker and member of Propaganda Due (1920–1986)

- Sindona in 1974
- Born: 8 May 1920; Patti, Italy
- Died: 22 March 1986 (aged 65); Voghera, Italy
- Education: University of Messina
- Occupations: Banker, lawyer
- Organization(s): Gambino crime family Propaganda Due
- Political party: Christian Democracy (Italy); Republican Party (United States)
- Spouse: Caterina Sindona
- Children: 3

Michele Sindona (Italian: [miˈkɛːle sinˈdoːna]; 8 May 1920 – 22 March 1986) was an Italian banker. Known in banking circles as "The Shark", Sindona was a banker for the Sicilian Mafia and the Vatican. Sindona was a member of Propaganda Due (#0501), a secret Masonic lodge of the Grand Orient of Italy. He was fatally poisoned in prison while serving a life sentence for the murder of lawyer Giorgio Ambrosoli.

== Early life and education ==
Born into a poor family in Patti, a small comune (municipality) in the province of Messina (Sicily), to a Neapolitan father, a florist who specialized in funeral wreaths, and a Sicilian mother, Sindona was educated by the Jesuits, and showed very early in his life an unusual aptitude for mathematics and economics. He graduated with a law degree from the University of Messina in 1942.

== Career ==
After landing on Sicily the Allied Forces gave important posts to the mafia, to reduce the influence of Communists and for them to organise the distribution of food aid. Sindona began working in smuggling operations with the Mafia transporting food in trucks. At the same time, many American-raised Italian mafia members, like Lucky Luciano, returned to Italy. Sindona wrote that in 1946, all worked in the black market, that within six months he doubled his capital like a Wall Street banker and that he waited for Meyer Lansky, a Jewish mobster and reputed banker for the mafia, to give him "a signal".

At the beginning of the 1950s, Sindona moved from Sicily to Milan, Northern Italy where he worked as a tax lawyer for rich Italians wanting to avoid paying taxes. He was an accountant for companies such as Società Generale Immobiliare and SNIA Viscosa. At the age of 30 he founded the company Fasco AG, inventing the system of back-to-back financing. His dexterity transferring money to Switzerland and Liechtenstein to avoid taxation soon became known to Mafia bosses. At the beginning of the 1950s, he travelled to New York and met the Gambino family. By 1957, he had become closely associated and was chosen to manage their profits from heroin sales. According to the pentito Mafioso (i.e., turned state's evidence) Francesco Marino Mannoia, Sindona laundered the proceeds of heroin trafficking for the Bontade-Spatola-Inzerillo-Gambino network. The mafiosi were determined to get their money back and would play an important role in Sindona's attempt to save his banks.

=== International banker ===
Within a year of being chosen by the Gambino family to manage their heroin profits, Sindona bought his first bank. At the beginning of the 1960s, Sindona was a friend of Giovanni Battista Montini, at the time archbishop of the Archdiocese of Milan and Cardinal. In 1964 Sindona made a deal with a London banker with the newly-introduced offshore Eurodollar. By the time Montini became Pope Paul VI, Sindona had acquired, through his holding company Fasco, many more Italian banks, and his progress continued right up to the beginning of his association with the Vatican Bank in 1969. Huge amounts of money moved from Sindona's banks through the Vatican to Swiss banks, and he began speculating against major currencies on a large scale.

In 1972, Sindona's Fasco International Holding purchased a controlling interest in Long Island's Franklin National Bank from Laurence Tisch. He was hailed as "the saviour of the lira" and was named "Man of the Year" in January 1974 by the US ambassador to Italy, John Volpe. But that April, a sudden stock market crash led to what is known as Il Crack Sindona ("The Sindona Bankruptcy"). The Franklin Bank's profit fell by as much as 98% compared to the previous year, and Sindona suffered a 40 million dollar loss. Consequently, he began losing most of the banks he had acquired over the previous seventeen years. On 8 October 1974 the bank was declared insolvent due to mismanagement and fraud, involving losses in foreign currency speculation and poor loan policies. Part of the losses involved Sindona's transfer of $30,000,000 of Bank funds to Europe to recover his losses. Sindona became a member of Propaganda Due (#0501), a secret Masonic lodge of the Grand Orient of Italy.

=== Ambrosoli murder, 1979 ===
On 11 July 1979, Giorgio Ambrosoli, the lawyer who was commissioned as liquidator of Sindona's banks, was murdered in Milan by three Mafia hitmen commissioned by Sindona.

Sindona feared that Ambrosoli would expose his manipulations in the Banca Privata Italiana case. Shortly before he was killed, the American Mafia hitman William Arico, a convicted bank robber, invoked the name of Giulio Andreotti – the influential Christian Democrat politician close to Sindona – in a threatening phone call taped by Ambrosoli. Arico fell to his death while trying to escape from a federal prison in New York in 1984. Andreotti later replied in an interview that Ambrosoli "was a person who, in Romanesque words, was looking for it".

=== Imprisonment, 1980-1986 ===
In 1980, Sindona was convicted in the United States of 65 charges, including fraud, perjury, false bank statements and embezzlement of bank funds; his defence was provided by one of the leading American lawyers, Ivan Fisher. The federal court in Manhattan, in addition to the 25-year prison sentence for the failure of the Franklin National Bank, fined Sindona $207,000.

While in United States federal prison, the Italian government applied for extradition so that Sindona could be present at the murder trial of Ambrosoli; this time, the request was accepted and on 25 September 1984 Sindona returned to Italy, where he was imprisoned in Voghera.

On 16 March 1985, in the trial for the bankruptcy of Banca Privata Italiana, Sindona was sentenced to 12 years in prison for the crime of fraudulent bankruptcy. The compensation for the damages was established in civil court; Sindona was sentenced to immediately pay a provisional amount of two billion lire to the liquidators of the bank and to the small shareholders who had filed a civil action lawsuit.

On 18 March 1986, he was sentenced to life imprisonment as the instigator of the Ambrosoli murder.

== Personal life and death ==
Two days after his life sentence, Sindona drank a potassium cyanide coffee in the Voghera prison; he died in the Voghera hospital after two days in a coma, on 22 March 1986.

== See also ==
- Lucky Luciano, American gangster
- Meyer Lansky, a Jewish mob banker
- Du Yuesheng, a Chinese mob banker

== Sources ==
- DiFonzo, Luigi (1983). St. Peter's Banker. Franklin Watts.
- Sterling, Claire (1990). Octopus. How the long reach of the Sicilian Mafia controls the global narcotics trade. New York: Simon & Schuster. ISBN 0-671-73402-4.
- Tosches, Nick (1986). Power on Earth. New York: Arbor House. ISBN 9780877957966. OCLC 1036786270.
- Yallop, David (1984). In God's Name: An Investigation Into The Murder of Pope John Paul I. Jonathan Cape.

== External links and further reading ==
- "A Forcibly Retired Moneyman". TIME. 13 September 1982. Archived from the original on 12 September 2010.
- Article (in Italian) on Propaganda Due
