= Francesco Marino Mannoia =

Member of the Sicilian Mafia

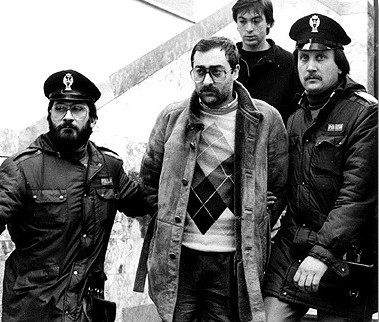
Francesco Mannoia (centre, foreground) in custody, circa 1986

Francesco Marino Mannoia (born 5 March 1951) is a former member of the Sicilian Mafia who became a pentito (government witness) in 1989. His nickname was Mozzarella. He is considered to be one of the most reliable government witnesses against the Mafia. Antimafia magistrate Giovanni Falcone, who was the first to interrogate him, recalled Marino Mannoia as an intelligent and reliable witness.

== Criminal career ==
He was raised in Palermo, the capital of Sicily, and joined the Santa Maria di Gesù Mafia Family, headed by Stefano Bontade. He was highly sought after by all Mafia families for his skills in chemistry to be used to refine heroin for the Spatola-Inzerillo-Gambino ring. Marino Mannoia recalled having refined at least 1,000 kilograms of heroin for Bontade. He had learned how to refine heroin from Antonino Vernengo, alias u dutturi (the doctor), who was the first to set up a refinery in 1977. He was also suspected of being involved in at least seventeen homicides.

During the Second Mafia War of the early 1980s his boss, Stefano Bontade, was murdered along with hundreds of associates. Mannoia only survived because he was in prison at the time for drug trafficking. He escaped from prison in 1983 with the help of his younger brother, a hitman named Agostino Marino Mannoia. They met with Corleonesi boss Salvatore Riina to establish their position in the dramatically altered landscape of the Sicilian Mafia and were both allowed to live and work under the auspices of the Corleonesi boss. Francesco Marino Mannoia became a major refiner of heroin for the Corleonesi.

In 1986 he was recaptured and returned to prison. On 20 April 1989, his brother Agostino Marino Mannoia, aged twenty-three, vanished and was never seen again. His bloodstained car was found later that day. Francesco Mannoia realised his brother had been killed. As it turned out, both Mannoia brothers had been plotting along with Vincenzo Puccio to overthrow Salvatore Riina as the boss of the Sicilian Mafia. Somehow word had got out and Agostino Marino Mannoia was the first of the conspirators against Riina who would die. Puccio and his brothers followed soon afterwards.

== Government witness ==
In the fall of 1989 Marino Mannoia’s mistress contacted the police’s Antimafia unit in Rome, indicating the mafioso was ready to talk. After negotiations over security, Marino Mannoia and magistrate Giovanni Falcone started a series of testimonies on 8 October 1989. He followed in the footsteps of Tommaso Buscetta and Salvatore Contorno in becoming an informant. Falcone recalled Marino Mannoia as an intelligent and reliable witness.

His collaboration was important because he was the first pentito that came out of the winning faction of the Second Mafia War. He was able to update the authorities on the activities within Cosa Nostra throughout the 1980s, including the lupara bianca of Filippo Marchese and Giuseppe Greco. Not long after he began to talk to the authorities, Mannoia's mother, aunt and one of his sisters were murdered in their Bagheria home as revenge, it being a common tactic by the Mafia to kill the relatives of the pentiti in order to discourage others from similar cooperation with authorities.

Marino Mannoia was admitted into the Witness Protection Program in the United States (Italy had no such programme at the time). In the US, he testified against the Sicilian faction of the Gambino Family, the so-called Cherry Hill Gambinos, John, Rosario and Joe Gambino. He had met with John Gambino, who had inspected the quality of the heroin Marino Mannoia was refining in Palermo.

== Testimonies ==
Marino Mannoia disclosed that Roberto Calvi, the so-called God's banker of the Banco Ambrosiano and the Vatican, had been killed by the Mafia because he had lost Cosa Nostra's criminal proceeds when the Banco Ambrosiano collapsed. According to Mannoia the killer was Francesco Di Carlo, a mafioso living in London at the time, and the order to kill Calvi had come from Mafia boss Giuseppe Calò and Licio Gelli. When Di Carlo became an informer in June 1996, he denied that he was the killer, but admitted that he had been approached by Calò to do the job.

Marino Mannoia testified that his former boss Stefano Bontade had close relations with Sicilian politicians, in particular with Salvo Lima, Prime Minister Giulio Andreotti’s man in Sicily. In April 1993, after the killing of Lima and the judges Giovanni Falcone and Paolo Borsellino, he gave evidence against former Italian Prime Minister Giulio Andreotti, who was accused of Mafia association. He claimed Andreotti had met with Stefano Bontade in the 1970s.

Marino Mannoia provided the first eyewitness account tying Andreotti directly to bosses of the Mafia. He described a high-level meeting in 1980 with Salvatore Inzerillo and Stefano Bontade at which Andreotti allegedly arrived with Lima in a bulletproof Alfa Romeo belonging to the Salvo cousins. Andreotti had come to protest the killing of Piersanti Mattarella in January 1980.

He also testified about the murder of journalist Mauro De Mauro. The investigative reporter had been kidnapped and killed by the Mafia in 1970. Marino Mannoia had been ordered by Bontade in 1977 or 1978 to dig up several bodies, including the one of De Mauro and dissolve them in acid.

Marino Mannoia admitted he had been one of the men who had stolen the Nativity with St. Francis and St. Lawrence, a painting by Michelangelo Merisi da Caravaggio that has never been seen since it was stolen in 1969 (the artwork was believed, at one point, to have been in the hands of the late Mafia boss Rosario Riccobono).

== Witness Protection Program ==
He lived in an undisclosed location with a new identity in the FBI Witness Protection Program, having been granted American citizenship after testifying against a number of Sicilian Mafiosi at work in the US. It was claimed, and not denied, that Marino Mannoia received US$600,000 when he gave evidence against Giulio Andreotti in the spring of 1993. At the time he was living at liberty in the US on US$3,000 per month plus his father’s pension, all paid from Italy.

He served a cumulative 17-year jail sentence in Italy and the U.S., which he finished in February 2010. In June 2011, after 16 years under protection by the US Marshall Service, he returned to Italy. Forced to not have an own identity and live in uncomfortable conditions, he considered the conditions of life in the United States unacceptable to him and especially his family. His wife and two children could not adapt to life in the United States. His allowance in Italy was reduced to 1,000 euros a month.

Marino Mannoia was disillusioned by the little reward and support he received from the Italian government in relation to the sacrifice he made and family members that had been killed. "I am disappointed, embittered, after everything I have done for the fight against the Mafia since 1989," he said. He attempted suicide by taking a cocktail of pharmaceuticals in July 2011, but was saved by his wife who got him to the hospital in time.

== Quotes ==
- Many believe that you enter Cosa Nostra for money. This is only part of the truth. Do you know why I entered Cosa Nostra? Because before in Palermo I was Mr. Nobody. Afterward, wherever I went, heads lowered. And this for me was worth any price.
