= Salvo Vitale =

Italian poet (1943–2025)

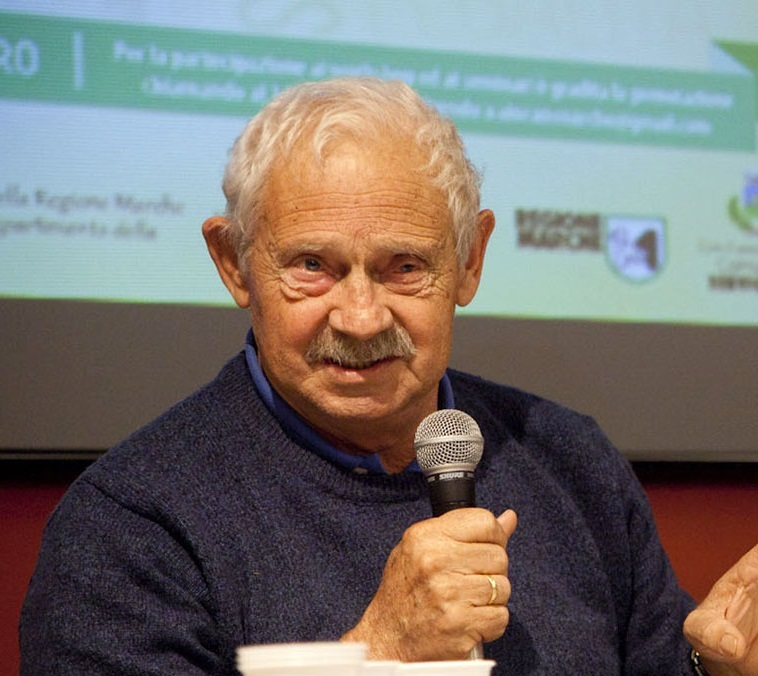
Vitale in 2014

Salvatore "Salvo" Vitale (16 August 1943 – 19 August 2025) was an Italian writer and poet.

== Life and career ==
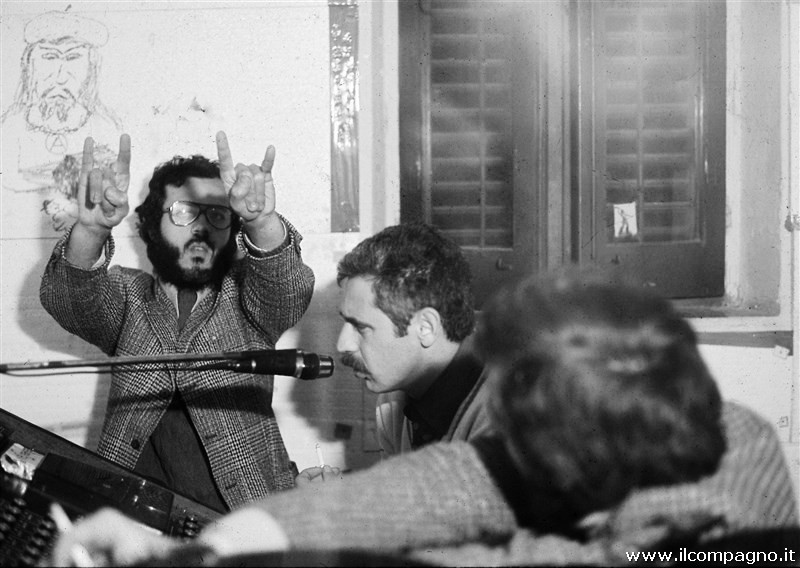
Vitale at Radio Aut in 1978

Vitale was born in Cinisi on 16 August 1943, to Vincenzo Vitale and Calogera Maltese. His father participated in the Spanish Civil War, having his right hand amputated. His mother was the daughter of a wealthy landowner from Cinisi, whose land was later expropriated and used for the construction of the third runway of Punta Raisi airport.

Vitale began his elementary studies in Terrasini, before attending the three-year middle school at the Archiepiscopal Seminary of Monreale and completed his high school studies at the Classical High School of Partinico. Since the 1960s, he had been a promoter of cultural life of his town, Terrasini, participating in activities at the local Reading Center, where he founded a local newspaper called "The Olympic Eye". From 1964 to 1968 he was the local correspondent of the newspaper "L'Ora" of Palermo.

Since its foundation, in 1977, he had been the presenter of Radio Aut, where, alongside Peppino Impastato and other collaborators, he denounced the crimes and illegal activities of the mafia of Cinisi and Terrasini, starting with the mafia boss Gaetano Badalamenti. Since Impastato was killed by the Sicilian Mafia on 9 May 1978, Vitale fought to preserve his memory, writing a number of poems and books related to him.

On 24 September 2021, he appeared in the Netflix series Vendetta, guerra nell'antimafia.

Vitale died in Partinico on 19 August 2025, at the age of 82.
