= Mount Longa =

Mountain in Italy

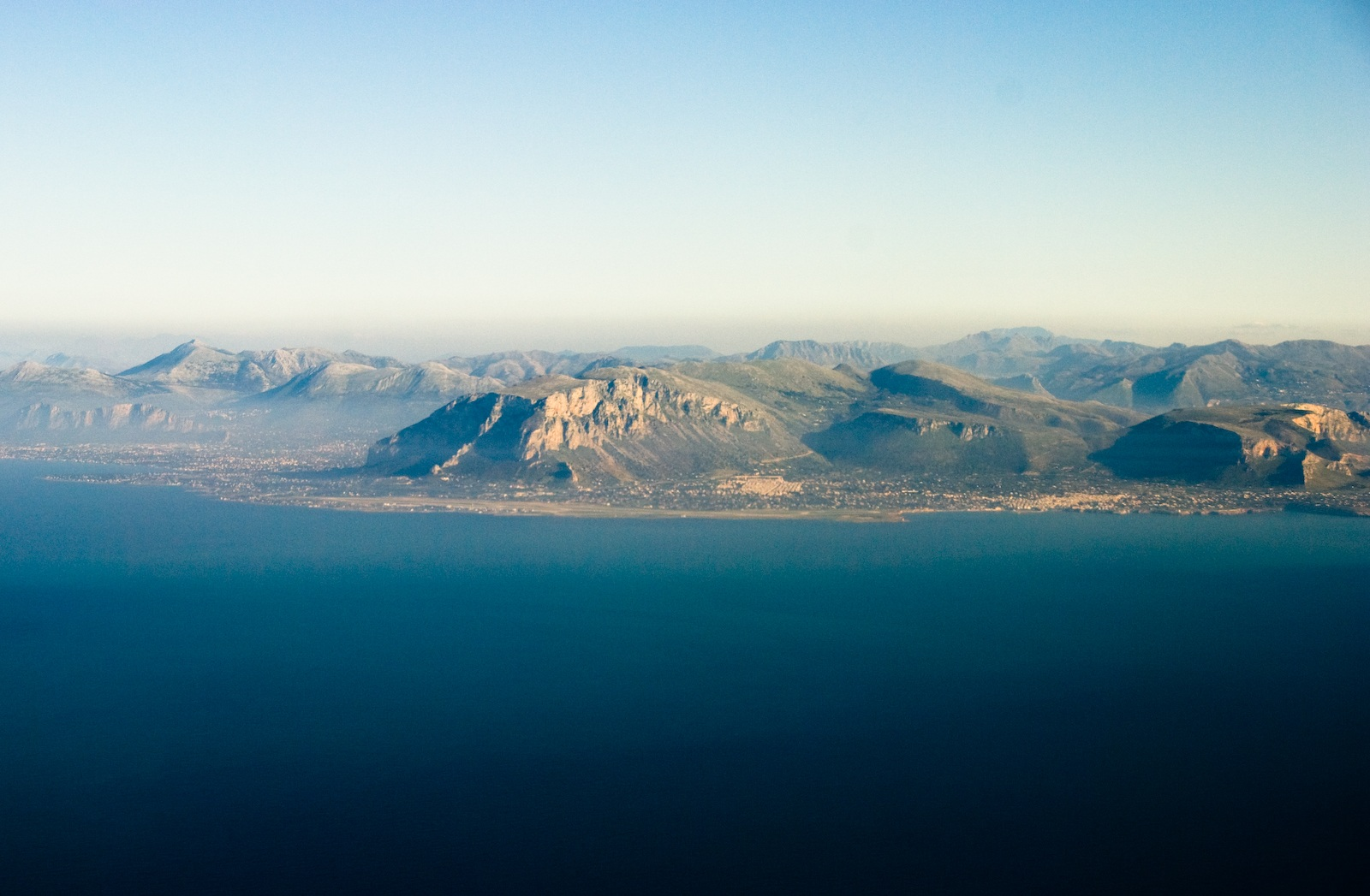
- Mount Logna in March 2008

Highest point
- Elevation: 975 metres (3,199 ft)
- Prominence: 429 metres (1,407 ft)
- Coordinates: 38°07′34.09″N 13°08′52.5″E

Naming
- English translation: Long Mountain

Geography
- Location: Metropolitan City of Palermo, Sicily, Italy
- Parent range: Mountains of Palermo

Mount Longa (Italian: Mountagna Longa, lit. Long Mountain) is a mountain located in the former Italian Province of Palermo in Sicily, between the communes of Cinisi and Carini. Its highest peak is 975 meters above mean sea level.

== Description ==
Mount Longa is located between the communes of Carini, Cinisi, and Terrasini, and is near Palermo Airport.

On May 5, 1972, Alitalia Flight 112 crashed into the mountain, killing all 115 people on board. A memorial was installed at the crash site.

The Forestry Corps of the Sicilian Region uses the mountain for fire spotting, while radio and television broadcasters install repeaters there. There is a hiking path 6 kilometres (3.7 mi) long to the top, starting at the Santa Venera forest. Remains of lookout posts, possibly of Carthaginian origin, have been found near the summit by Palermo archaeologist Mannino.
