= Sicilian Centre of Documentation =

Anti-Mafia research group in Italy

The Sicilian Centre of Documentation (Italian: Centro Siciliano di Documentazione "Giuseppe Impastato", Centro Impastato) organizes research into the Mafia in Sicily and campaigns against it. The Centre was the first study centre on the Mafia in Italy.

== Mission ==
The Centre’s purpose is defined in terms of four main points:

- Develop awareness of the Mafia and similar organizations
- Develop projects aimed at fighting Mafia organizations
- Encourage the promotion of cultural legality
- Develop and promote democratic participation in society and government.

== History and activities ==
Umberto Santino and Anna Puglisi founded the Sicilian Centre of Documentation in 1977. Since then, the Centre has developed an archive dedicated to research into the Mafia. As a result, the centre has made research available to the public in form of information packs. The centre continues active in education about the Mafia and other criminal organizations by visiting schools and universities throughout Italy and the world. The Centre also organizes and initiates public demonstrations, and played a key role in the murder investigation of Giuseppe Impastato, murdered by the Mafia in May 1978. In Impastato’s honour, the Centre was renamed “The Centre of Giuseppe Impastato” in 1980. In 1998, the Centre was renamed again to “The Centre of Giuseppe Impastato – Non-profit Organization for Social Venues”.

This self-financed centre carries out activities that include the research of political, sociological, economic and historical data, as well as hosting conferences, exhibitions, and seminars. The centre also assists with the publication of informational pamphlets and books.

In 1979 the Centre organized the first anti-Mafia demonstration in Italian history. Over 2,000 demonstrators participated in this historic event. The Centre has also organized other demonstrations, which include peace movements, the protection of democratic participation and human rights.

=== Giuseppe "Peppino" Impastato and the Centre ===
Giuseppe Impastato (born 1948) was a political activist from Cinisi in Italy, murdered by the Mafia in 1978. Impastato campaigned against the Mafia by founding a journal titled “The Socialist Idea” and a self-financed radio show, Radio Aut. A particular target of Impastato was Mafia leader Gaetano Badalamenti, who lived near Impastato's family home. On May 8–9, 1978, Impastato was murdered. His body was discovered with a charge of TNT tied to a local railway line. At the time Impastato had been running for local elections under the Proletarian Democracy party. Despite his death just before the elections, Impastato was elected.

The Sicilian Centre for Documentation fought for years alongside Impastato's family to produce evidence against his murderers – the Mafia, led by Gaetano Badalamenti. Thanks to the Centre’s involvement, demonstrations and research, Badalamenti was convicted of Impastato’s murder and sentenced to life in prison in 2002.

== Recommended resources ==
- Albanese, J.A., D.K. Das and A. Verma (eds.) Mafia and Mafia-type Organizations in Italy. Organized Crime. World Perspectives, Prentice-Hall, 2003.
- Gambetta, Diego. The Sicilian Mafia: The Business of Private Protection. Cambridge: Harvard University Press, 1993.
- Vitale, Salvo. Nel Cuore Dei Coralli: Peppino Impastato, Una Vita Contro La Mafia. Italy: Rubbetino, 1995.
