= Cesare Manzella =

Member of the Sicilian Mafia

- Born: 18 December 1897; Cinisi, Sicily, Italy
- Died: 26 April 1963 (aged 65); Cinisi, Sicily, Italy
- Occupation: Mafioso

Cesare Manzella (Italian pronunciation: [ˈtʃeːzare manˈdzɛlla, ˈtʃɛː-]; 18 December 1897 – 26 April 1963) was a boss in the Sicilian Mafia who sat on the first Sicilian Mafia Commission. He was the head of the Mafia family in Cinisi, a small seaside town near the Punta Raisi Airport. As the airport was in their territory it was an invaluable asset for the import and export of contraband, including narcotics. His deputy was Gaetano Badalamenti.

== Expelled from the US ==
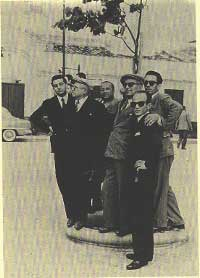
Cinisi's mafiosi at the festivities in honour of Santa Fara, the patroness of Cinisi, in 1952. From left: Leonardo Pandolfo, Cesare Manzella, Luigi Impastato and Masi Impastato, Sarino and Gaetano Badalamenti.

After a stay in the United States, where he had spent many years organising gambling houses in Chicago, Manzella settled back in Cinisi after he was expelled by US authorities in 1947. In Cinisi he owned an extensive citrus plantation. Manzella was described as a “violent and bullying individual”, by the local Carabinieri. “He is cunning and has a well-developed organisational ability, which enables him to enjoy an undisputed ascendancy over local criminals and mafiosi.” Not only in Cinisi but also in the surrounding communities Carini, Torretta, Terrasini, Partinico, Borgetto and Camporeale. He was a member of the first Sicilian Mafia Commission that was established in 1958.

Manzella loved to show off as a benefactor. As he strolled down the narrow streets of Cinisi, wearing his wide-brimmed American-style hat, he would hand out pocketfuls of sweets to orphans and street rascals. He devoted a proportion of his illicit profits to building an orphanage. His charity was rewarded by his election as president of the Azione Cattolica (Catholic Action) in Cinisi.

== First Mafia War ==
Manzella was heavily involved in cigarette smuggling and heroin trafficking. He was a protagonist in the First Mafia War. The conflict erupted over an underweight shipment of heroin. The shipment was financed by Manzella, the Greco cousins from Ciaculli and the La Barbera brothers from Palermo Centre. Suspicion fell on Calcedonio Di Pisa, who had collected the heroin for Manzella from the Corsican supplier, Pascal Molinelli, and had organised the transport to Manzella's partners in New York.

The case was brought before the Mafia Commission, but disagreement on how to handle it led to a bloody conflict, known as the First Mafia War, between the Grecos, headed by Salvatore "Ciaschiteddu" Greco, and the La Barberas – in particular when Di Pisa was killed on 26 December 1962. Manzella sided with the Grecos and became the target of the rival faction. Manzella was killed on 26 April 1963, when he was blown to pieces by a car bomb. Pieces of Manzella's body were found stuck to lemon trees hundreds of meters from the crater where the car had been.

== Impastato ==
Manzella was an uncle by marriage of Giuseppe Impastato, the Anti-mafia activist who was murdered by the Mafia in 1978. Peppino Impastato's Anti-mafia activity might have been triggered by the brutal murder of Manzella when Peppino was 15 years old. Peppino was traumatized by the event, saying: "Is this really Mafia? If this is Mafia I will fight it for the rest of my life…".
