= Alitalia Flight 112 =

1972 passenger plane crash near Palermo, Italy

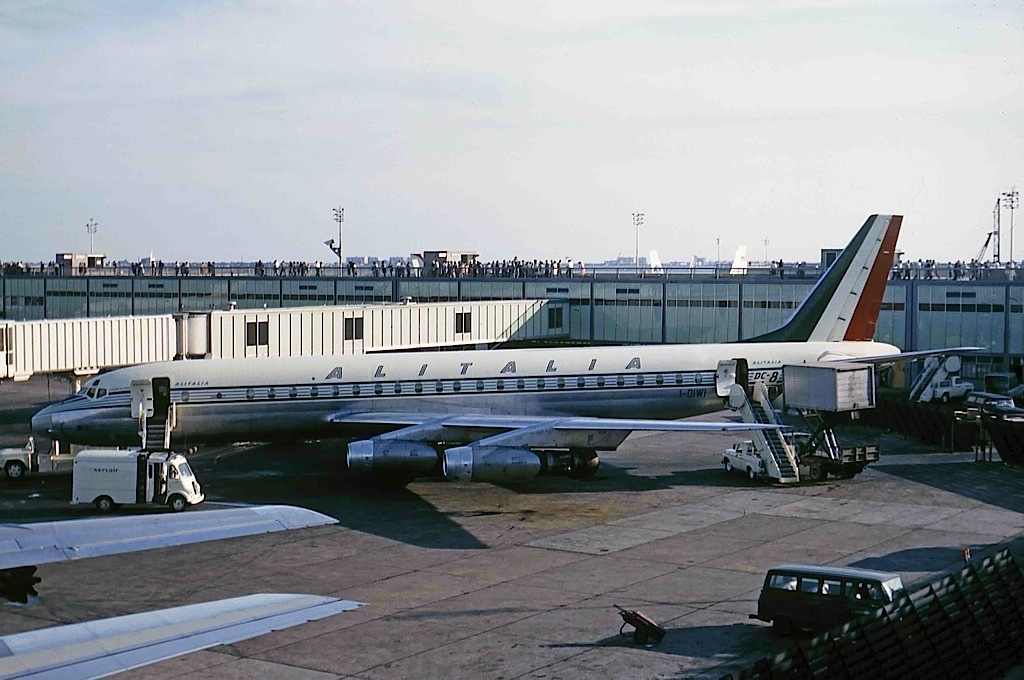
- An Alitalia Douglas DC-8-43 similar to the accident aircraft.

Accident
- Date: 5 May 1972
- Summary: Disputed: Controlled flight into terrain due to pilot error (official investigation), Explosion on board caused by an explosive device (Independent investigation)
- Site: Mount Longa, near Palermo, Italy; 38°07′23″N 13°08′53″E

Aircraft
- Aircraft type: Douglas DC-8-43
- Aircraft name: Antonio Pigafetta
- Operator: Alitalia
- IATA flight No.: AZ112
- ICAO flight No.: AZA112
- Call sign: ALITALIA 112
- Registration: I-DIWB
- Flight origin: Fiumicino – Leonardo da Vinci International Airport, Rome, Italy
- Destination: Falcone–Borsellino Airport, Palermo, Italy
- Occupants: 115
- Passengers: 108
- Crew: 7
- Fatalities: 115
- Survivors: 0

Alitalia Flight 112 was a scheduled flight from Leonardo da Vinci Airport, in Rome, Italy, to Palermo International Airport in Palermo, Italy, with 115 on board. On 5 May 1972, the Douglas DC-8 crashed into Mount Longa, about 3 miles (4.8 km) southwest of Palermo while on approach to the airport, killing all 115 passengers and crew onboard. Investigators believe that the crew had three miles visibility and did not adhere to the established vectors issued by air traffic control, while according to an independent investigation the accident was caused by an explosion on board.

It remains the deadliest single-aircraft disaster in Italy, and the second-deadliest behind the 2001 Linate Airport runway collision. The accident is the worst in Alitalia's history.

== Accident ==
On 5 May 1972, the aircraft I-DIWB of Alitalia (a Douglas DC-8-43) started the flight AZ 112 from Rome to Palermo, taking off 36 minutes late. Captain Roberto Bartoli was in charge of the radio assistance, while First Officer Bruno Dini flew the aircraft. Gino Di Fiore served as the flight engineer.

The flight AZ 112 contacted Palermo Approach around 9:10 PM stating to be at 74 nautical miles (137 km) from VOR (which is installed on Mount Gradara, above the municipality of Borgetto, with a frequency of 112.3 MHz, around 10 miles (16 km) south of the airport of Punta Raisi). Control tower replied with meteorological data (five knot wind, five kilometer visibility, cumulus clouds at 1,700 feet and cirrus clouds at 20,000 feet) and then authorized the descent, instructing the aircraft to report their position when they reached an NDB radio beacon designated PRS at an altitude of 5,000 feet. The times and locations have been precisely recovered from the recorder of Rome Control, which had a time recorder, while Palermo Approach did not.

Commander Bartoli then made the following transmission to air traffic controller Sergeant Major Terrano:

Bartoli	Palermo, AZ 112... is on the vertical leaving 5,000 and will report downwind for 25 left. (Note: At the time off the accident, Palermo had two parallel runways: 25L and 25R. 25R was later converted into a taxiway.)
Terrano	Roger, the wind is always calm.
Bartoli	Okay... [unintelligible words]

Contact between flight AZ 112 and the control tower was lost, the only communication was in English between the DC-8 itself and an Ilyushin Il-18 that was waiting for take-off, the tower tried to contact AZ 112 but received no response. Around 10:23–24 PM, the aircraft (coming from Ponente-lato Terrasini) hit a crest 935 meters (1,980 feet) high, about 300 feet (91 m) below the top of the mountain, and slid for a long time on the ground with its wings, its fuselage, and its four engines, until it disintegrated in the successive hits against the rocks of the crest. Part of the debris and bodies of the victims rolled on the mountain side (Carini side) from where the kerosene fire was witnessed. The wreckage was strewn across a 2.5-mile (4.0 km) area, so wide it took rescue teams three hours to reach it. Later on, some witnesses at Carini said that they had seen the aircraft on fire before the crash.

The crash occurred on the 26th anniversary of Alitalia.

A memorial has been erected at the site of the crash.

== Victims ==
Of the 115 passengers and crew, almost all were Italian; the only known foreigners aboard were a Belgian stewardess, three British people and a French couple. The travellers were, for the most part, returning home to vote in the Italian national elections that weekend. Among the victims of the crash were the noted film director Franco Indovina (who was working on a film about Enrico Mattei) and Cestino Vycpalek, the son of the then-coach of the Juventus team, Čestmír Vycpálek. The victims also included Palermo deputy attorney general Ignazio Alcamo (who had ordered the forced residence of Francesco Vassallo, a construction worker with ties to the Sack of Palermo and Antonietta Bagarella, the future wife of Italian mafia leader Salvatore Riina); Angela Fais, the editorial secretary of L'Ora and Paese Sera and a friend of Giovanni Spampinato; Letterio Maggiore the former doctor of bandit Salvatore Giuliano (Maggiore also testified in the trial for the Portella della Ginestra massacre); Lidia Mondì Gagliardi, one of Palermo Airport's first passengers; and Alberto Scandone a journalist for the Italian Communist Party. The crash left 98 children orphaned and 50 spouses widowed.

Persons on board by nationality:
Nationality	Passengers	Crew	Total
Italian	102	6	108
British	4	0	4
French	2	0	2
United States	1	0	1
Belgium	0	1	1
Total	108	7	115

== After the accident ==
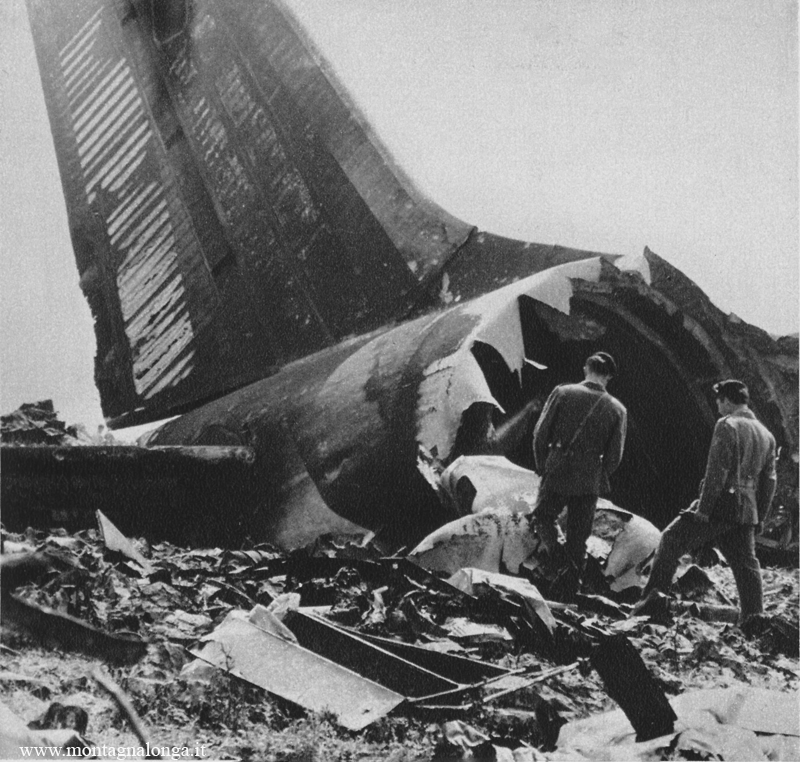
A close-up view of the tail

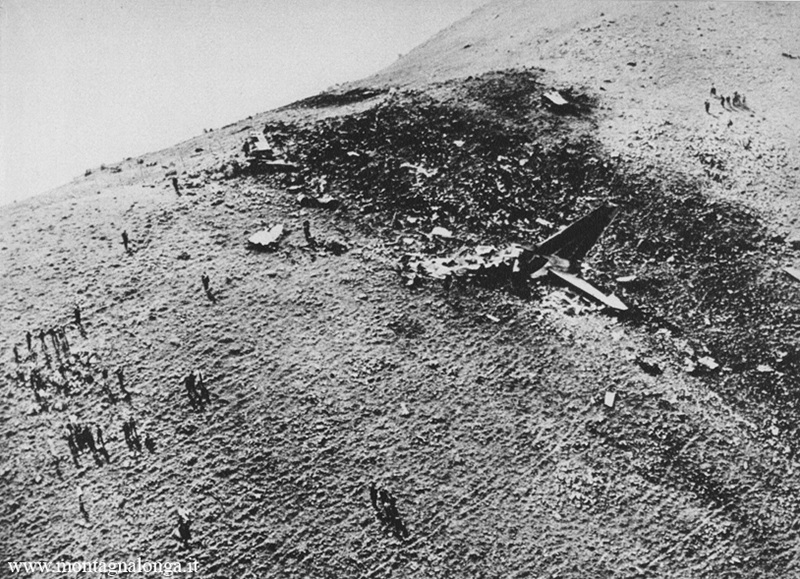
Wreckage of Flight 112

The trial represented the official version of events. The trial targeted the pilots for not following the guidelines of the flight controllers. The reason for the crash was labeled as 'pilot error' and a controlled flight into terrain (CFIT) (describes an unintentional crash by an airworthy aircraft into the ground).

There is another version of the accident held by some of the victims' relatives. Mrs. Maria Eleonora Fais, sister of Angela Fais, who died in that plane, was able to find, after many years, the report of the Vice-Chief of Police Giuseppe Peri that says that the plane exploded because of a bombing. Peri accuses an alliance of people having ties with the Mafia and with a subversive group from the Right with the responsibility for this bombing. Three days after the accident the political elections would be held in which a strong rise of the Right was foreseen. The National Association of Italian Pilots (ANPAC) sided with the pilots, refusing the possibility of a mistake due to their long experience and because the accusation of an intoxication to prove their "exclusive" responsibility had been denied. Other problems have been raised on the bad position of the airport of Punta Raisi. (On the position of the airport, see the accusations raised by Giuseppe Impastato).

There is an urban legend that in the crash of Montagna Longa a mythical first wife or partner of the songwriter Francesco De Gregori found her death. But it is only an unfounded conjecture deducted from the words of the song Buonanotte Fiorellino, which seems to make allusion to the tragedy. In reality, the song is inspired by "Winterlude" of Bob Dylan.

In March 2012, a Carabinieri general whose brother died in the accident asked the Catania prosecutor's office to reopen the investigation into the disaster because, according to him, there had been a connection between a NATO training, with related air traffic, and a photo taken the day after the accident showing what were presumably bullet holes in the wing of the DC-8.

On June 27, 2023, the families of the Montagna Longa massacre asked, launching an appeal to the Head of State, to reopen the investigations. In a note signed by Ernesto Valvo, president of the Association of the families of the victims of Montagna Longa where it is stated that: "The judiciary has recently rejected the request to reopen the investigations presented by us, resulting from the meticulous report of Professor Rosario Marretta, who hypothesizes the presence of explosives on board the DC 8 that mysteriously crashed on May 5, 1972. Not to mention that no light has ever been shed on the failure of the black box and the disappearance of the radar track".

== See also ==
- Alitalia Flight 4128
- Itavia Flight 870
- List of accidents and incidents involving commercial aircraft

== Bibliography ==
- Antonio Bordoni. "Piloti malati – Quando il pilota non-scende dall'aereo". Roma, Travel Factory S.r.l., Dicembre 2008.
- Giorgio De Stefani. "Navigazione Aerea Manuale Giuridico Amministrativo". Roma, Istituto Poligrafico e Zecca dello Stato, 1985.
- Edoardo Rebulla. "Sogni d'acqua". Sellerio Editore Palermo.
- Renato Azzinnari e Leone Zingales. "Anni difficili". Casa Editrice Istituto Gramsci Siciliano.
- Francesco Terracina, "L'ultimo volo per Punta Raisi. Sciagura o strage?", Nuovi Equilibri, 2012 ISBN 978-88-622-2285-3
- Fabrizio Berruti, "Settanta. Il poliziotto e la strage negata", Round Robin, 2022
- Rosario Ardito Marretta, "The Case of Alitalia Flight AZ 112", Unconventional Aeronautical Investigatory Methods, 2022

== Filmography ==
- La verità migliore (trans. "A better truth"), documentary directed by Lorenza Indovina, Italy, 2025, 85'
