= Badalamenti =

Badalamenti is an Italian surname. Notable people with the surname include:

- Angelo Badalamenti (1937–2022), American arranger and composer
- Gaetano Badalamenti (1923–2004), Italian mobster, father of Vito
- Vincent Badalamenti (born 1958), American mobster
- Vito Badalamenti (born 1957), Italian mobster, son of Gaetano
