= The Hundred Steps =

The Hundred Steps may refer to:

- One Hundred Steps, a 2000 Italian film known in its original language as I cento passi
- The Hundred Steps (Barmouth, Wales)
- The Hundred Steps (Renton, Scotland), a former drovers' road converted into a path
