= One Hundred Steps =

I cento passi
- Original Movie Poster for I cento passi
- Directed by: Marco Tullio Giordana
- Written by: Claudio Fava; Marco Tullio Giordana; Monica Zapelli
- Produced by: Fabrizio Mosca (producer); Guido Simonetti (line producer)
- Starring: Luigi Lo Cascio; Luigi Maria Burruano; Lucia Sardo; Paolo Briguglia; Tony Sperandeo
- Cinematography: Roberto Forza; Stefano Paradiso
- Edited by: Roberto Missiroli
- Release date: September 1, 2000 (Italy)
- Running time: 114 minutes
- Country: Italy
- Languages: Italian; Sicilian

I cento passi (English: One Hundred Steps or The Hundred Steps) is an Italian biographical crime drama film released in 2000, directed by Marco Tullio Giordana about the life of Peppino Impastato, a left-wing political activist who opposed the Mafia in Sicily. The story takes place in the small town of Cinisi in the Province of Palermo, the home town of the Impastato family. One hundred steps was the number of steps it took to get from the Impastato house to the house of the Mafia boss Tano Badalamenti. The film has been released on Regions 2 and 4 DVDs but a Region 1 release has yet to be made. Although selected as the Italian entry for the Best Foreign Language Film at the 73rd Academy Awards, it was not nominated.

== Plot ==
The film opens with Peppino as a small child singing the popular song "Nel blu, dipinto di blu" (Domenico Modugno) with his brother in the back seat of a car on the way to a family gathering. The family is of good standing in the community and they are celebrating this. In this scene, the relationship between Peppino and his uncle Cesare Manzella is established. His uncle is a Don or Mafia boss in the small town of Cinisi where the story is set. In a scene, soon after the happy family gathering, we see Don Cesare killed by a car bomb which was planted by a rival Mafia boss. This ends Peppino's time of innocence. Even as a small child he is thrust into the realities of life in the Mafia.

After his uncle's funeral, he goes to a local painter, Stefano Venuti, who is also a very outspoken member of the communist party in Sicily, to paint a picture of Cesare. Stefano refuses and does not really give him a reason. He did not get along with Cesare when he was alive because of their great difference in political views but he cannot explain this to the sad stubborn little boy. Stefano ends up taking Peppino under his wing and puts his stubborn persistent energy to better use by working with the Communist Party in Sicily. The story then jumps to when Peppino is a young adult in his early 20s protesting against the government expropriating land that belonged to local farmers to build an airport with his Comrades in the Communist Party. They all end up in the local jail where Peppino is bailed out by his father.

After this incident, Peppino brings Stefano an article he has written for a local propaganda newspaper titled "La Mafia è una montagna di merda" or "The Mafia is a pile of shit" which Stefano deems to be too extreme and very dangerous to publish. This is the point where there is a break between Peppino and Stefano. Peppino becomes more and more extreme in his hatred for the Mafia and his need to expose all of the corruption that is happening in the town. Peppino and his father get into an argument because of this article and this causes a rift between Peppino and his family.

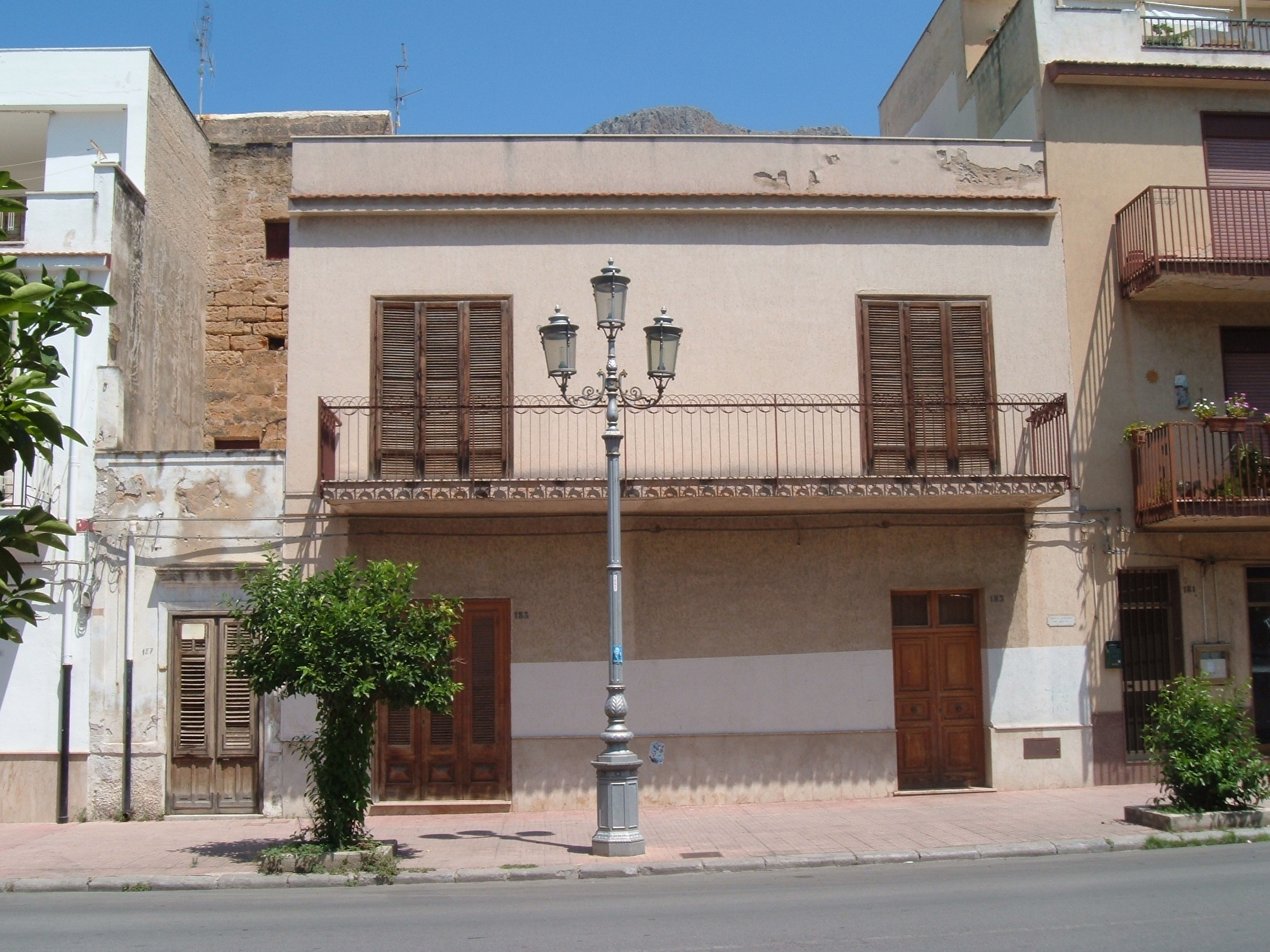
The house of Gaetano Badalamenti, hundred steps from Peppino's family house

Peppino's next step to expose the Mafia was to create a radio station with his friends called "Radio Aut" which condemned the Mafia and told about don Tano's participation in the drug trade. At this point, Peppino's father is under a lot of pressure to make his son stop what he is doing. Peppino gets kicked out of his family's house. His mother is still looking out for him. She brings him books and keeps him hidden from his father. Meanwhile, Luigi cannot handle the situation that Peppino has created at home so he goes to visit his relatives in the United States. They tell him that they can get Peppino a job in radio in the States if he wants.

Shortly after Luigi returns, he has a conversation with Peppino and then gets hit by a car on his walk home from his restaurant. Peppino does not acknowledge his father's Mafia friends at his funeral. This was not unexpected from him and it was rude and dangerous. By this point, Peppino starts to doubt in the people's commitment to resist the Mafia. He feels like he is all alone in his resistance. He decides to run for office in a local election running under a very small leftist party while continuing his radio crusade.

The Mafia eventually gets tired of Peppino and decides that life would be easier without him. They have men follow him in his car one night and when he stops at a railroad crossing they drag him out of his car beat him until he cannot move, tie him to the railroad tracks with TNT and blow him up. His friends realize that something's up and go looking for Peppino. They cannot find anything until the morning when they find the carabinieri in the spot where Peppino has been killed. They can see the blood on the ground from where he was beaten. They protest vehemently to the carabinieri to investigate it as murder (as it obviously was from the evidence) but the carabinieri, having been influenced by the Mafia, rule the case terrorist act, and then later on as suicide and leave. At his funeral, there is a huge demonstration of support from the many people who he had made an impact on in his ten years of anti-Mafia and Communist party work.

Peppino Impastato was killed on May 9, 1978. The case was originally treated as a suicide and no one was convicted for his murder until 1997 when the case was reopened and Gaetano Badalamenti was convicted and given a life sentence for the murder.

== Main characters ==
- Giuseppe "Peppino" Impastato – Played by Luigi Lo Cascio is the young activist that this movie is based on. At a young age he became very aware of the harsh reality of the Mafia when his uncle was blown up by a car bomb. He becomes a very active member of the Communist party in Sicily. He creates a radio station, radio Aut, to get the word out on how bad the Mafia is and identifies the Mafia boss on the air. He also used it as an extreme form of free speech and a rallying point for the youth of Sicily.
- Luigi Impastato – Played by Luigi Maria Burruano is Peppino's father and works for the local Mafia boss who is the center of all of the local drug trade. He and Peppino have a falling out and Luigi starts falling apart under the strain of the Mafia boss who wants him to shut Peppino up. He after a long time of non communication with his family or Peppino has one last conversation with Peppino in his diner, Peppino offers him a ride home but he cannot take it due to his emotional state and ends up being hit by a car and dies. We are left wondering if this is an accident or if it was murder.
- Felicia Impastato – Played by Lucia Sardo is Peppino's mother. She walks a fine line between her husband and her son when the two are not speaking. When Peppino has moved out of the house because of the disagreement between him and his father it is his mother who keeps him updated on the family and helps him to get food and his books and other such things. In the end she gets left behind with all of the pain and sorrow from losing her husband and oldest son.
- Giovanni Impastato – Played by Paolo Briguglia is Peppino's younger brother. He does not follow in the footsteps of his brother even though he stays friendly with him for the most part. He stays with his mother and helps her to deal with all of the drama that is happening between father, son and the local Mafia.
- Cesare Manzella – Played by Pippo Montalbano was Peppino's favorite uncle and a Mafia boss who is at the very beginning blown up with a car bomb by a rival Mafia boss.
- Gaetano "Tano" Badalamenti – Played by Tony Sperandeo is the local Mafia boss who Peppino persecutes on the radio. Tano is the person who eventually gets so fed up with Peppino's attitude toward the Mafia that he has him killed.
- Stefano Venuti – Played by Andrea Tidona is the painter who is also a leftist activist who Peppino goes to when he is very young to have him paint a picture of his Uncle Cesare who was killed. He refuses because he had not gotten along with Cesare because he was a communist and Cesare was in the Mafia. Stefano ends up inspiring Peppino to take his anger toward the Mafia to lead a movement against all of the corruption and violence. The Communist party helped Peppino get started on his political and very dangerous career.

== Awards ==
- David di Donatello awards 2001: Best actor (Luigi Lo Cascio), best supporting actor (Tony Sperandeo), best costume designer (Elisabetta Montaldo), best screenplay
- Brussels Film Festival 2001: Golden Iris – Best European feature, Silver Iris – Best screenplay
- Hollywood Foreign Press Association (Golden Globes) 2001: Nominated: Best foreign language film
- San Paolo Film Festival 2000: Audience award – Best feature
- Venice Film Festival 2000: Cineavvenire award – Best screenplay, Pasinetti award – Best film; Nominated: Golden Lion

== Other media ==
The Modena City Ramblers have recorded a song titled "I cento passi", which contains samples from the movie.

== See also ==
- List of submissions to the 73rd Academy Awards for Best Foreign Language Film
- List of Italian submissions for the Academy Award for Best Foreign Language Film
