= Pizza Connection Trial =

Criminal trial against Mafia members

United States v. Badalamenti
- Court: United States District Court for the Southern District of New York
- Full case name: United States v. Gaetano Badalamenti et al
- Decided: March 2, 1987; 39 years ago (verdict); June 22, 1987; 39 years ago (sentencing)
- Verdict: Guilty as to 18 defendants Not guilty as to 1 defendant 2 defendants pleaded guilty 1 defendant died before trial

Court membership
- Judge sitting: Pierre N. Leval

The Pizza Connection Trial (in full, United States v. Badalamenti et al.) was a criminal trial against the Sicilian Mafia and American Mafia that took place before the United States District Court for the Southern District of New York in New York City, U.S. The trial centered on a number of independently owned pizza parlor fronts used to distribute drugs, which had imported US$1.65 billion of heroin from Southwest Asia to the United States between 1975 and 1984. The trial lasted from September 30, 1985, to March 2, 1987, ending with 18 convictions, with sentences handed down on June 22, 1987. Lasting about 17 months, it was the longest trial in the judicial history of the United States at the time.

== Background ==
In the second half of the 1970s, the Palermo mafiosi Nunzio La Mattina, Tommaso Spadaro and Giuseppe Savoca purchased large quantities of morphine in Switzerland from the Turkish trafficker Yasar Avni Musullulu on behalf of the other Mafia families and transported it, by sea or by land, to Palermo and the surrounding area, where numerous illegal heroin refineries common to all the families were active. In 1980 the investigators discovered for the first time one refinery in the Piraineto district of Punta Raisi and another in Trabia, managed by the mafioso Gerlando Alberti, who was arrested together with three chemists from Marseille who worked for him. In 1982 another refinery was discovered, in Palermo, in via Messina Marine, managed by the mafioso Pietro Vernengo.

The trial centered on a Mafia-run enterprise that involved processing heroin from Sicily, morphine purchased from Turkey and Southwest Asia, and cocaine from South America, for final distribution of the drugs in the United States through independently owned pizza parlor fronts as the money was laundered through several banks and brokerages in the United States and overseas. The enterprise was estimated to have imported US$1.65 billion of heroin to the United States, namely the Northeast and the Midwest, between 1975 and 1984.

For about a year, the prosecution, consisting of Richard A. Martin, Louis J. Freeh, Robert Stewart, Robert B. Bucknam and Andrew C. McCarthy, gathered hundreds of witnesses, wiretaps, and thousands of documents, which cost several million dollars to complete. Arrests of conspirators were coordinated in the United States, Italy, Switzerland and Spain on April 8, 1984, following the capture of Gaetano Badalamenti and his son Vito Badalamenti together with Pietro Alfano in Madrid, Spain; on November 15, they were extradited to the United States. Badalamenti was formerly on the Sicilian Mafia Commission. A day later, the Federal Bureau of Investigation arrested nearly 30 people in New York City, seizing weapons and drugs.

Turncoat witness Tommaso Buscetta (in sunglasses) is led into court at the "Maxi Trial", circa 1986.

One of these witnesses was Sicilian Mafia pentito Tommaso Buscetta, who had already revealed information to Italian magistrate Giovanni Falcone to prepare for the Maxi Trial. In December 1984, Buscetta was extradited to the United States where he received a new identity from the government, American citizenship and placement in the Witness Protection Program in exchange for new revelations against the American Mafia in the Pizza Connection Trial.

Another witness was Sicilian Mafia pentito Salvatore Contorno, who followed the example of Buscetta, and began collaborating in October 1984, and also testified at the Maxi Trial.

Former undercover FBI agent Joseph D. Pistone, who infiltrated the Bonanno crime family between 1976 and 1981 using the alias "Donnie Brasco", also testified at the trial.

== Trial ==
=== Defendants ===
Out of those arrested, 22 Sicilian-born defendants stood in the trial that began on September 30, 1985:

- Gaetano Badalamenti
- Salvatore Catalano
- Joseph Lamberti
- Salvatore Mazzurco
- Salvatore Lamberti
- Giovanni Ligammari
- Baldassare Amato
- Vincenzo Randazzo
- Pietro Alfano
- Emmanuele Palazzolo
- Samuel Evola
- Vito Badalamenti
- Giuseppe Trupiano
- Giuseppe Vitale
- Lorenzo DeVardo
- Giovanni Cangialosi
- Salvatore Salamone
- Salvatore Greco
- Frank Castronovo
- Gaetano Mazzara
- Francesco Polizzi
- Filippo Casamento

=== Developments ===
Buscetta provided no direct connection between the defendants and drugs. Contorno testified that defendant Frank Castronovo, cousin of Carlo Castronovo in Sicily, used pizza parlors as fronts in the United States. Contorno also testified that he had a meeting in 1980 in Bagheria about heroin and had seen Castronovo there with three other defendants—Salvatore Catalano, Gaetano Mazzara, and Salvatore Greco. Pistone testified that he was told that a Bonanno faction headed by Dominick Napolitano had formed an alliance with a Sicilian faction, which involved Salvatore Catalano.

=== Verdicts ===
Over the course of the trial, Gaetano Mazzara was murdered and Pietro Alfano was seriously wounded, and on March 2, 1987, two of the 22 men pleaded guilty to lesser currency violations, while 18 of the remaining 19 defendants were convicted of running an international drug ring. Vito Badalamenti was the only defendant acquitted. Sentences were handed down by judge Pierre Leval on June 22, 1987. Five of the defendants were sentenced to 45 years in prison, while the 13 other defendants faced maximum sentences of between 15 and 40 years in prison for their convictions on charges of participating in the drug conspiracy. Gaetano Badalamenti was sentenced to 45 years in prison and fined $125,000, and since he was extradited from Spain with the provision that he serve no more than 30 years, he was ordered to be released after 30 years should he live that long. Salvatore Catalano was also sentenced to 45 years in prison but fined $1.15 million (equivalent to $4.25 million in 2025) and ordered to pay $1 million (equivalent to $2.8 million in 2025) in restitution; Salvatore Mazzurco was sentenced to 35 years in prison, fined $50,000 (equivalent to $142,000 in 2025), and ordered to pay $500,000 in restitution (equivalent to $1,417,000 in 2025); Salvatore Lamberti was sentenced to 20 years in prison, fined $50,000 (equivalent to $142,000 in 2025), and ordered to pay $500,000 in restitution (equivalent to $1,417,000 in 2025); and Giuseppe Lamberti was sentenced to 35 years in prison, fined $150,000 (equivalent to $425,000 in 2025), and ordered to pay $500,000 in restitution (equivalent to $1,417,000 in 2025).

== Bibliography ==
- Alexander, Shana (September 1, 1988). The Pizza Connection: Lawyers, Drugs and The Mafia. Diane Pub Co. ISBN 0788168363.
- Blumenthal, Ralph (1988). Last Days of the Sicilians. Crown Publishing. ISBN 0-8129-1594-1.
- Stille, Alexander (1995). Excellent Cadavers. Vintage.
- Decision of the United States Court of Appeals for the Second Circuit, U.S. v. Casamento, 887 F. 2d 1141 (2d Cir. 1989)
