= Alitalia Flight 4128 =

1978 aviation accident

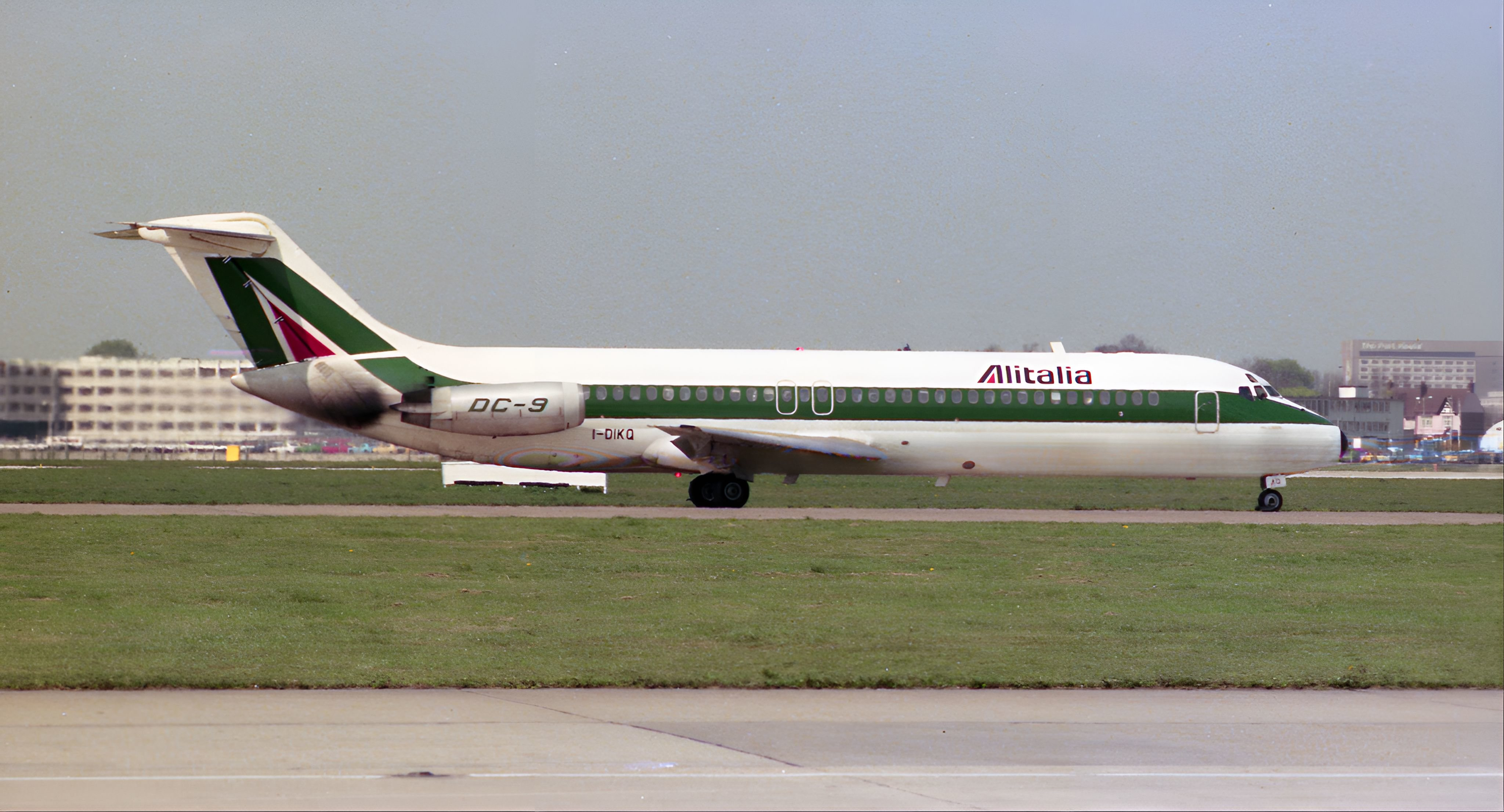
- I-DIKQ, the aircraft involved in the accident

Accident
- Date: 23 December 1978
- Summary: Controlled flight into water, pilot error
- Site: Tyrrhenian Sea, off Palermo, Italy; 38°12′28″N 13°06′32″E

Aircraft
- Aircraft type: McDonnell Douglas DC-9-32
- Aircraft name: Isola di Stromboli
- Operator: Alitalia
- IATA flight No.: AZ4128
- ICAO flight No.: AZA4128
- Call sign: ALITALIA 4128
- Registration: I-DIKQ
- Flight origin: Leonardo da Vinci Airport, Rome, Italy
- Destination: Palermo International Airport, Palermo, Italy
- Occupants: 129
- Passengers: 124
- Crew: 5
- Fatalities: 108
- Injuries: 20
- Survivors: 21

Alitalia Flight 4128 was a scheduled flight from Leonardo da Vinci Airport, in Rome, Italy, to Palermo International Airport in Palermo, Italy, with 129 on board. On 23 December 1978, the McDonnell Douglas DC-9-32 crashed into the Tyrrhenian Sea about 3 km (1.9 mi) north of Palermo while on approach.

As a result of the accident, out of 129 people (between passengers and crew), 108 perished and 21 survived, rescued by nearby fishing boats. At the time of the incident, it was the second-deadliest air crash in Alitalia's history behind Alitalia Flight 112 which had crashed 6 years earlier whilst operating the same route.

== Cause ==
The accident was attributed to the flight deck crew believing they were nearer to the runway than they were, and therefore making a premature descent. The initial part of the approach was instrumental until the flight was 2 miles (3.2 km) from Palermo International Airport. The crew then stopped the descent at 150 feet (46 m) above the sea, as though trying to locate the final approach area, thinking they were close to the runway because of the airport lights. In the final nine seconds, the aircraft flew almost level with the sea at 150 knots (280 km/h; 170 mph); then, because of the wind, the aircraft lost its final altitude and impacted the water with its right wing. 108 of the 129 passengers and crew on board were killed.
