= Vito Badalamenti =

Italian criminal

- Mug shot of Badalamenti
- Born: 29 April 1957 (age 69); Cinisi, Sicily, Italy
- Parent: Gaetano Badalamenti
- Allegiance: Cosa Nostra

Vito Badalamenti (Italian pronunciation: [ˈviːto badalaˈmenti]; born 29 April 1957) is a member of the Sicilian Mafia. He was on the "Italy's most wanted list" from 1995 until 2012 when the statute of limitations was declared expired.

== Mafia heritage ==
Vito Badalamenti was born in Cinisi, Sicily. He is the eldest son of Mafia boss Gaetano Badalamenti, one-time boss of the Sicilian Mafia Commission and a notorious heroin trafficker who was the principal defendant in the Pizza Connection Trial in the mid-1980s in New York.

In 1981, at the start of the Second Mafia War, Vito followed his father in voluntary exile after Badalamenti was expelled from Cosa Nostra by the rival faction of the Corleonesi headed by Totò Riina. They moved to Brazil and later to Spain.

== Pizza Connection ==
Vito Badalamenti was involved in the heroin trafficking activities of his father, known as the Pizza Connection. After extensive surveillance, the Spanish police arrested Vito and Gaetano Badalamenti in Madrid on April 8, 1984, capping a four-year undercover investigation by Italian and US law enforcement agencies on both sides of the Atlantic. The arrest set off a series of raids by the Federal Bureau of Investigation throughout the United States.

Both were extradited to the United States on November 15, 1984. They were unable to post multimillion-dollar bails and remained in jail throughout the trial. On June 22, 1987, Vito was the only one acquitted at the Pizza Connection Trial, while his father was sentenced to 45 years in prison. In Italy, Vito Badalamenti received a six-year sentence in the Maxi Trial.

== Fugitive ==
Vito Badalamenti was a fugitive since 1995. In 2000, the Italian police issued an international arrest warrant. He is alleged to be either in Australia or Brazil. He has not lost his contacts with Sicily, Mafia boss Salvatore Lo Piccolo was in contact with Badalamenti before Lo Piccolo was arrested in November 2007.

On 30 March 2012, the Appellate Court of Palermo, chaired by Gianfranco Garofalo, accepted the appeal of his legal advisers Paolo Gullo and Vito Ganci, declaring extinct by statute of limitations the punishment imposed on him.
