= Giuseppe Impastato =

Italian political activist (1948–1978)

Peppino Impastato in 1977

Giuseppe "Peppino" Impastato (Italian pronunciation: [dʒuˈzɛppe pepˈpiːno impaˈstaːto]; 5 January 1948 – 9 May 1978), was an Italian political activist who opposed the Mafia, which ordered his murder in 1978.

== Childhood ==
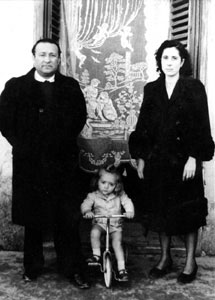
Giuseppe Impastato as a child, with his father Luigi Impastato and his mother Felicia Bartolotta

Giuseppe "Peppino" Impastato was born in Cinisi, in the then province of Palermo, into a Mafia family. His father Luigi Impastato had been sent into internal exile during the fascist era, and was a close friend of Mafia boss Gaetano Badalamenti. His father's brother-in-law, Cesare Manzella, was an important Mafia boss who was killed in a car bomb attack in 1963. As an adolescent, Peppino broke off relations with his father – who kicked him out of the house – and initiated a series of political and cultural antimafia activities.

According to his younger brother Giovanni Impastato, Peppino's antimafia activity might have been triggered by the brutal murder of his uncle by marriage, Cesare Manzella, who was blown to pieces by a car bomb in April 1963 when Peppino was fifteen years old. Pieces of his uncle – who was the Mafia boss of Cinisi at the time – were found stuck to lemon trees hundreds of meters from the crater where the car had been. Peppino was traumatized: "Is this really Mafia? If this is Mafia I will fight it for the rest of my life."

== Political activist ==
In 1965, Peppino Impastato founded the newsletter L'idea socialista (The Socialist Idea) and joined the left-wing PSIUP party (Italian Socialist Party of Proletarian Unity). He took a leading role in the activities of the new revolutionary movements that sprung up in 1968. He led struggles by Cinisi peasants whose land had been expropriated to build the third runway at Palermo's Punta Raisi Airport, as well as disputes involving construction workers and the unemployed. In 1975, he set up Music and Culture with other young people in Cinisi. The group organised debates, film, theatre and music shows and started a self-financed radio station named Radio Aut in 1976.

Peppino Impastato used humor and satire as his weapon against the Mafia. In his popular daily radio programme Onda pazza (Crazy Wave) he mocked politicians and mafiosi alike. On a daily basis he exposed the crimes and dealings of mafiosi in Mafiopoli (Cinisi) and the activities of Tano Seduto (a pun on Toro Seduto, Sitting Bull), a thinly disguised pseudonym of Gaetano Badalamenti, the capomafia of Cinisi. Nevertheless, it was Peppino Impastato and his friends that were considered to be the real nuisance and 'undesirable elements' by the authorities in town, not the 'respected' men such as Badalamenti.

Peppino's brother Giovanni declared before the Italian Antimafia Commission: "It seemed that Badalamenti was well liked by the carabinieri as he was calm, reliable, and always liked a chat. It almost felt like he was doing them a favour in that nothing ever happened in Cinisi, it was a quiet little town. If anything, we were subversives who made nuisances of ourselves. This was what the carabinieri thought. When I had a chance to speak to one of them – something which didn't happen often because I didn't really trust them – I realised that it was a widely held belief that Tano Badalamenti was a gentleman and it was us who were the trouble-makers." "I often used to see them walking arm in arm with Tano Badalamenti and his henchmen. You can't have faith in the institutions when you see the police arm in arm with mafiosi."

Impastato clearly understood the danger represented by Badalamenti, and Badalamenti clearly understood the danger of Peppino Impastato. Impastato's struggles were too public and determined for the Mafia to allow his tireless activities to continue. Apparently, his father tried to protect him but unfortunately he was killed in a car accident in 1977, which might have been a premeditated murder. Apparently, Badalamenti waited until after Impastato's father had died to give the order to kill Impastato.

== Death ==
In 1978 Peppino Impastato stood as a candidate in the Cinisi council elections for Proletarian Democracy (Democrazia proletaria). He was killed during the election campaign on the night of 8–9 May, by a charge of TNT placed under his body, which had been stretched over the local railway line – a sinister twist of fate to the car-bomb that had killed his uncle and initiated Peppino's revolt against the Mafia. The same day Christian-Democrat former Prime Minister Aldo Moro's corpse was discovered on Via Caetani in Rome. Two days later voters in Cinisi elected him as a councillor.

Initially press, police and investigative magistrates considered that Peppino Impastato had been a left-wing terrorist who had tried to bomb a railway line, but caused his own death. After the discovery of a letter written by Impastato several months before his death, authorities started talking about suicide. Thanks to the efforts of his brother Giovanni Impastato, his mother Felicia Bartolotta Impastato (who publicly broke relations with their Mafia relatives), his fellow activists, and the Centro siciliano di documentazione (founded in Palermo in 1977; Giuseppe Impastato's name was added to its masthead in 1980), the Mafia's responsibility for the crime would be identified after a struggle of many years.

Following a statement made by a former member of the Cinisi Mafia, the pentito Salvatore Palazzolo who had turned state witness, and named Badalamenti as the instigator of the murder, the investigation was formally reopened in June 1996, and in November the following year an arrest warrant was issued for Badalamenti. In 1998 a committee was formed by the Italian Parliament's permanent Antimafia Commission to investigate the 'Impastato case'. On 6 December 2000, it issued a report which outlined the responsibilities of State officials in leading the investigations astray. On 5 March 2001, the Court of Assises declared Vito Palazzolo to be guilty of murder, initially handing down a thirty-year sentence, however, the Court later overturned his conviction. Gaetano Badalamenti was given a life sentence on 11 April 2002.

Peppino's mother, Felicia Bartolotta Impastato, reacted to the conviction in a very dignified manner: "I never have had any feelings of revenge. All I have done is call for justice for my son's death. I have to confess that, after so many years of waiting, I had lost faith; I never thought we would reach this point. Now I feel a great deal of contentment and of satisfaction. I always knew what had happened. Badalamenti used to call my husband Luigi to complain about Peppino, and my husband begged him not to kill the boy." The epitaph engraved on Peppino's grave in Cinisi reads as follows: "Revolutionary and Communist militant - Murdered by the Christian-Democratic mafia".

== In popular culture ==
- In the 1994 Italian TV series La piovra, season 7, the character of Daniele Rannisi, a young man who disavows his family connection to the Mafia and starts a satirical pirate radio show denouncing their activities, was based on Impastato.
- In 2000, the movie I cento passi, directed by Marco Tullio Giordana, was released about the life and death of Peppino Impastato. "I cento passi" (one hundred steps) was the distance between the Impastato's house and the house of Tano Badalamenti.
- In 2004 the song "I cento passi" was released by Italian band Modena City Ramblers in the memory of Peppino Impastato.
- The 2011 album La cretina commedia by Italian "ska" band Talco is a concept album about the life and work of Peppino Impastato.
- In 2016 the movie Felicia Impastato in the memory of Peppino Impastato's mother for justice struggle in IMDB.
- In 2018, the indie game 1977: Radio Aut was released, which is an interactive story chronicling Peppino Impastato's early life and his efforts to bring to light the harm caused by the Mafia and local corruption.

== See also ==
- List of victims of the Sicilian Mafia
- List of journalists killed in Europe
