= Terrasini =

- Comune
- Comune di Terrasini
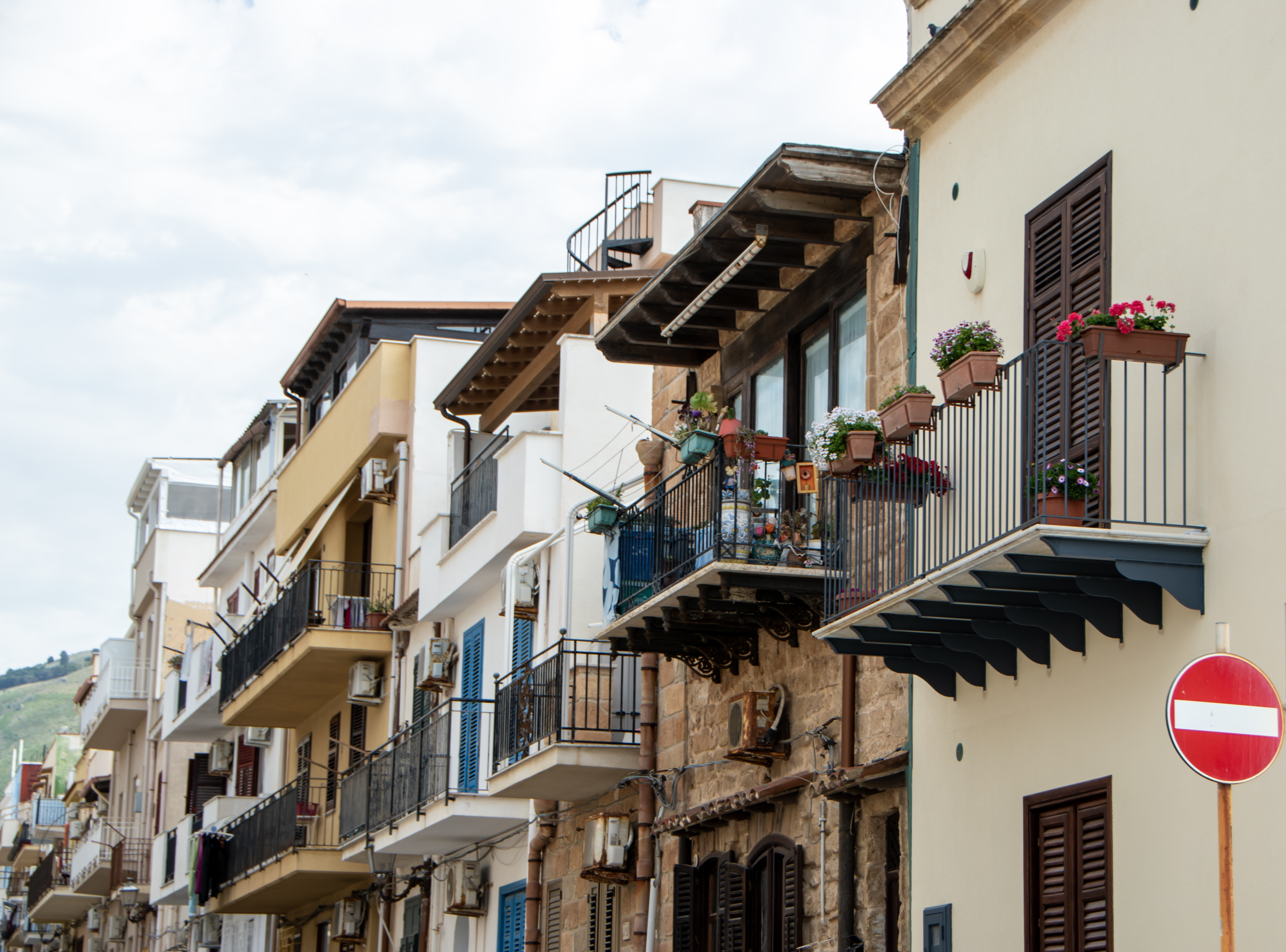
- Buildings in Terrasini

- Location within Italy Location within Sicily
- Coordinates: 38°9′N 13°5′E
- Country: Italy
- Region: Sicily
- Metropolitan city: Palermo (PA)

Government
  - Mayor: Giosuè Maniaci (since 5 June 2018)

Area
  - Total: 19.85 km^{2} (7.66 sq mi)
- Elevation: 33 m (108 ft)

Population (31 October 2018)
  - Total: 12.693
  - Density: 0.6394/km^{2} (1.656/sq mi)
- Time zone: UTC+1 (CET)
  - Summer (DST): UTC+2 (CEST)
- Postal code: 90049

Terrasini is a town and comune (municipality) in the Metropolitan City of Palermo on the island of Sicily in Italy.

== Data ==
Terrasini is located 30 kilometres (19 mi) west of Palermo at the motorway between Palermo and Trapani, between the mountains and the Gulf of Castellammare near the Palermo International Airport. Neighboring municipalities are: Carini, Cinisi, San Vito Lo Capo, Balestrate, Partinico and Trappeto.

Terrasini's population works mainly in fishing and tourism.

== History ==
The name Terrasini probably derives from Latin "terra sinus" = "land at the gulf" (the Gulf of Castellamare) or from "terra sinorum" = "land of the bays" due to the strongly curved coastline with a large number of larger and smaller bays. The name was first cited for the region in a letter from the archive of the abbey San Martino delle Scale near Monreale of 24 November 1350 as "terras vocatas li Terrasini".

The grottoes in the area of Terrasini were inhabited already in the late Paleolithic times. On different sites, tracks of Roman settlers were found.

The origin of the town goes back to the late medieval times to a small settlement (called Favarotta) of agricultural workers on the large-scale landed property of the family "La Grua Talamanca" from Carini.

In the 17th century, fishermen settled at the coast. When the former feudal property was left to the agricultural workers for cultivation, a flourishing agriculture developed around the fishers' village.

Modern Terrasini was founded 24 October 1836, when King Ferdinand II issued a decree that the village Favarotta, then considered part of neighboring Cinisi, should be merged with adjoining Terrasini as a single community.

== Sights ==
=== Culture ===
- Chiesa Madre "Maria SS delle Grazie", (18th century, facade of 1901)
- Chiesa "Maria SS della Provvidenza"
- Chiesa "Maria SS del Rosario"
- Chiesa "S Rosalia", (18th century)
- Palazzo Grua, (18th century), now seat of the town administration
- Palazzo Cataldi, (18th century), now seat of the town library
- Palazzo Aumale, built in the 19th century as a winery by Henri d'Orléans, duc d'Aumale, the son of king Louis-Philippe of France, now comprising the three sections of the Museo Civico:
  - Museo del Caretto (ethno-anthropological section)
  - Antiquarium (archeological section)
  - Museum of history of nature
- Old watchtowers along the coast: Torre Alba (16th century), Torre di Capo Rama (15th century), Torre Toledo or Paternella (16th century)
- Villa Fassini
- Fishers and tourists port

=== Nature ===
- Grotta Perciata, a large grotto in the cliffs
- Cala Rossa (red bay, due to the red colour of the rocks)
- Natural Park (Riserva Naturale) Capo Rama

== Festivals ==
- Festa di li schietti (on Easter Sunday)
- Festa di San Pietro (end of June)
- Festa di Maria Santissima delle Grazie (4 September)
- Estate Terrasinense (June - September): Season of theater and concert performances throughout the town

== Gallery ==
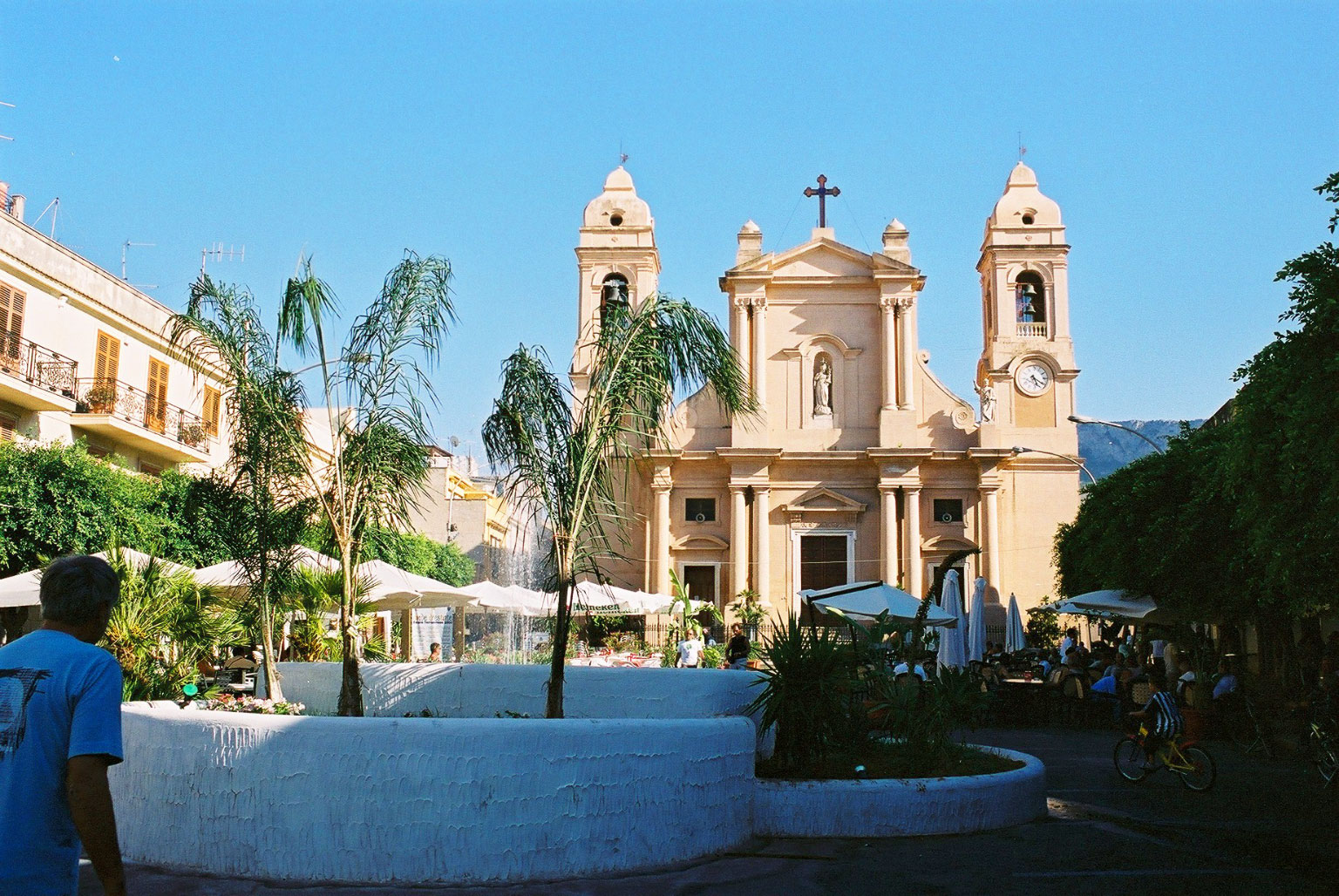
Piazza Duomo with Chiesa Madre

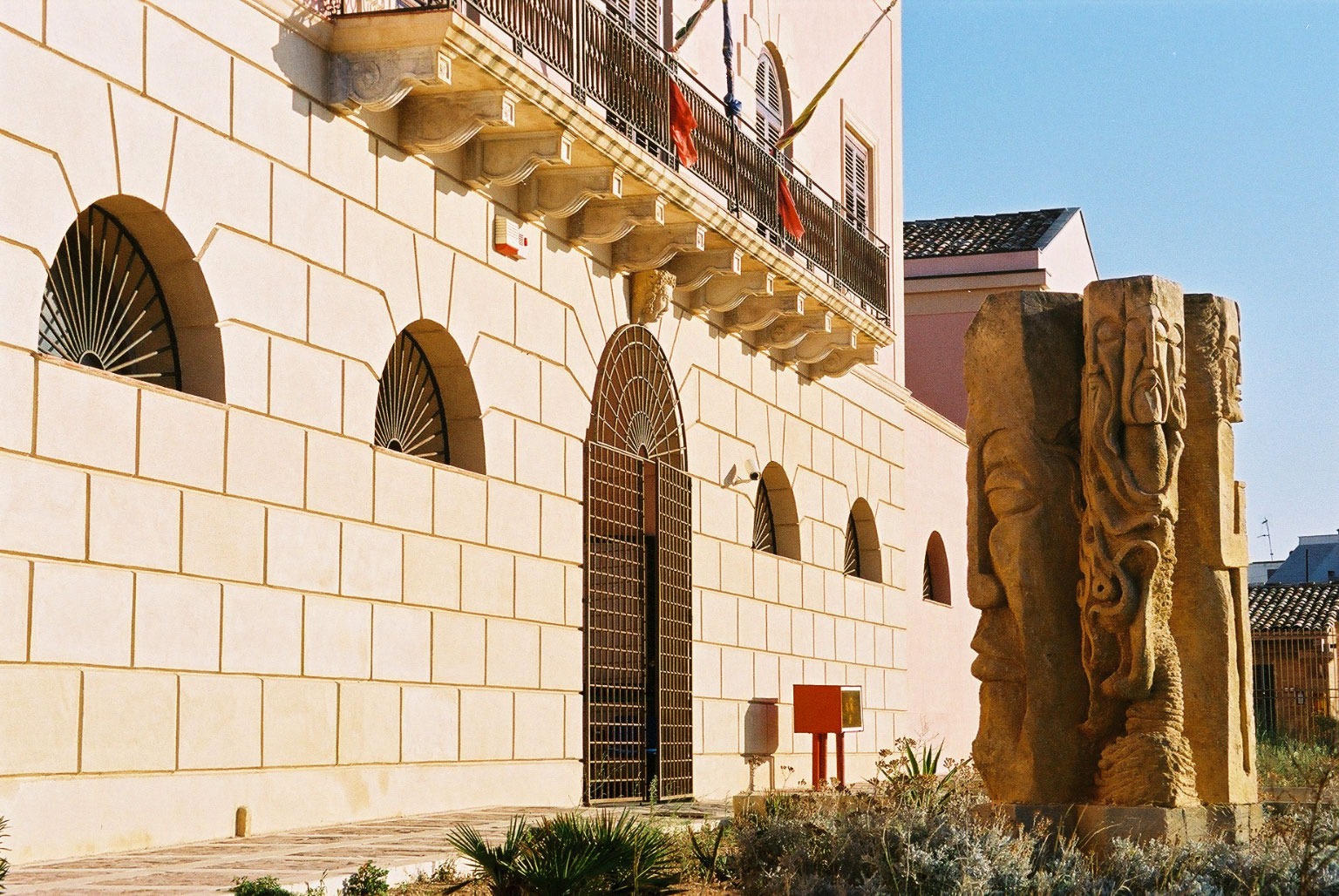
Palazzo Aumale

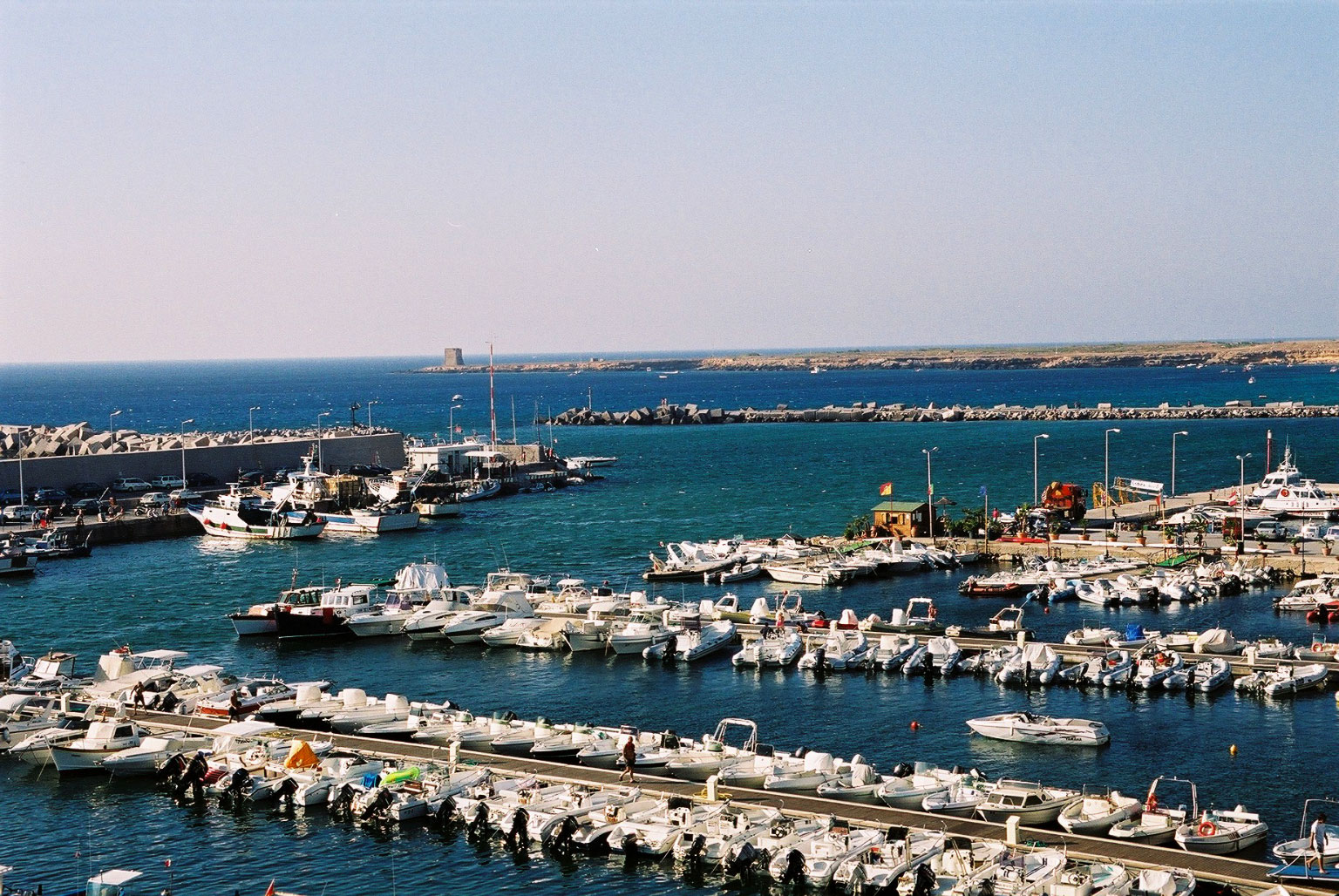
Port

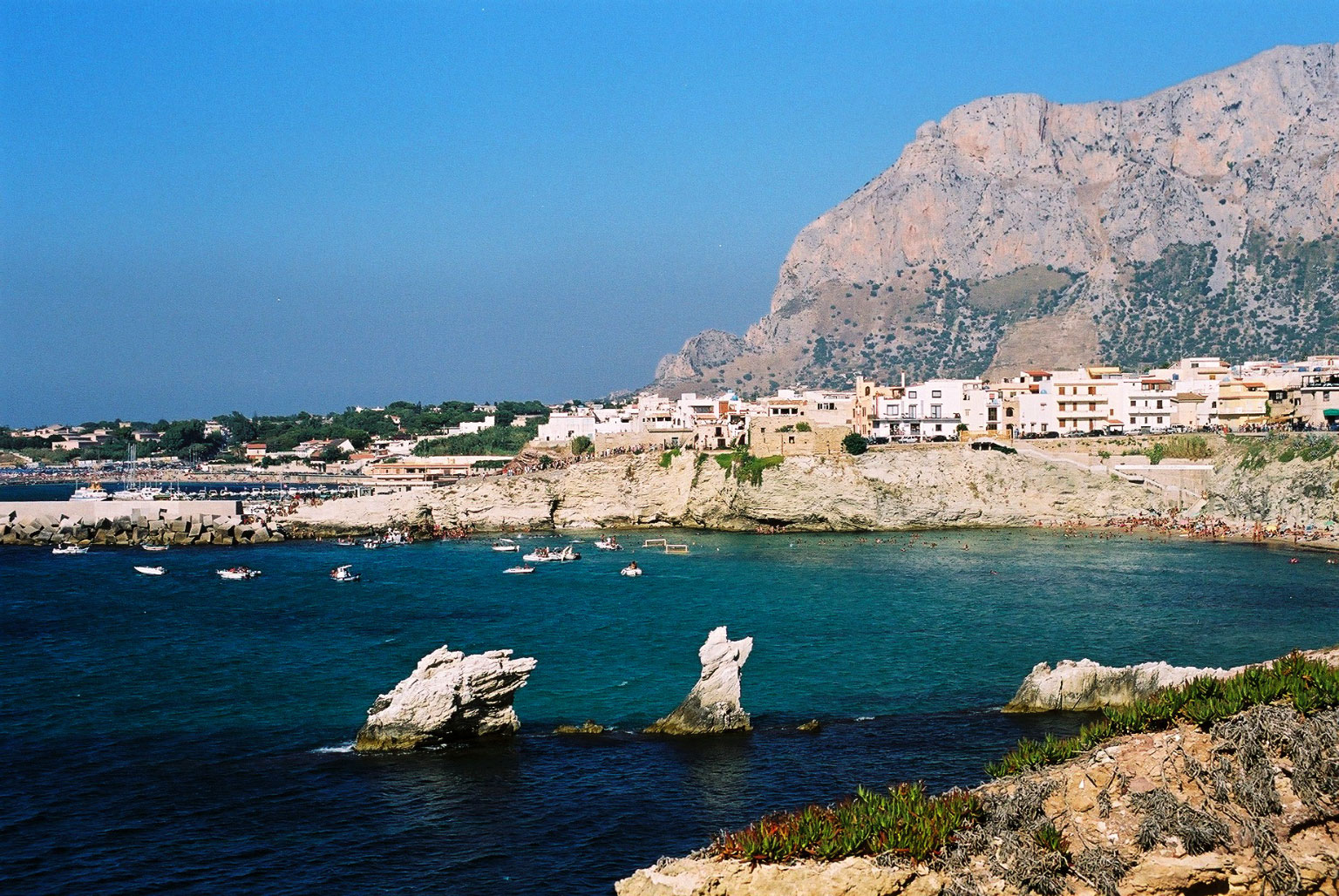
Seaside

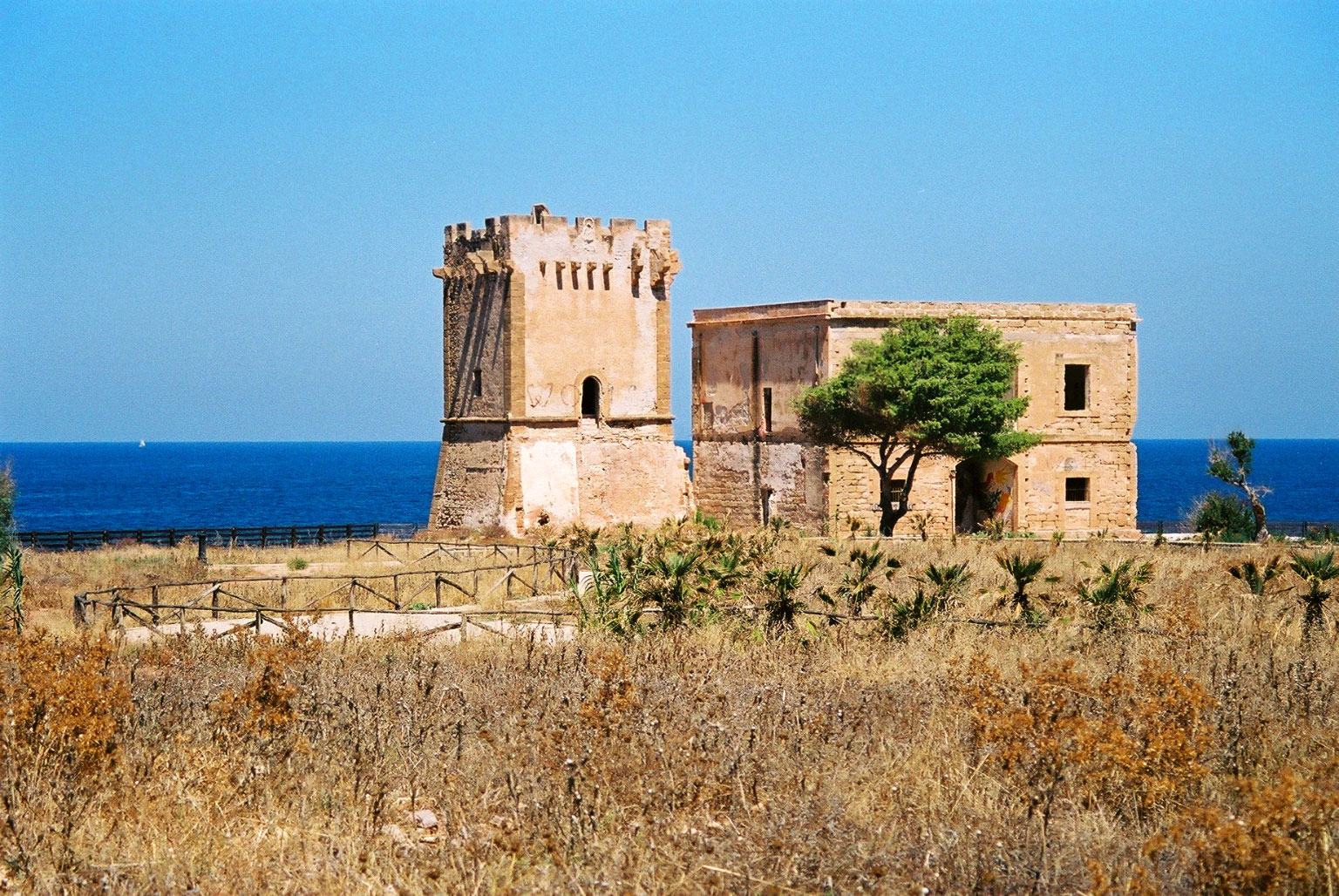
Torre Alba

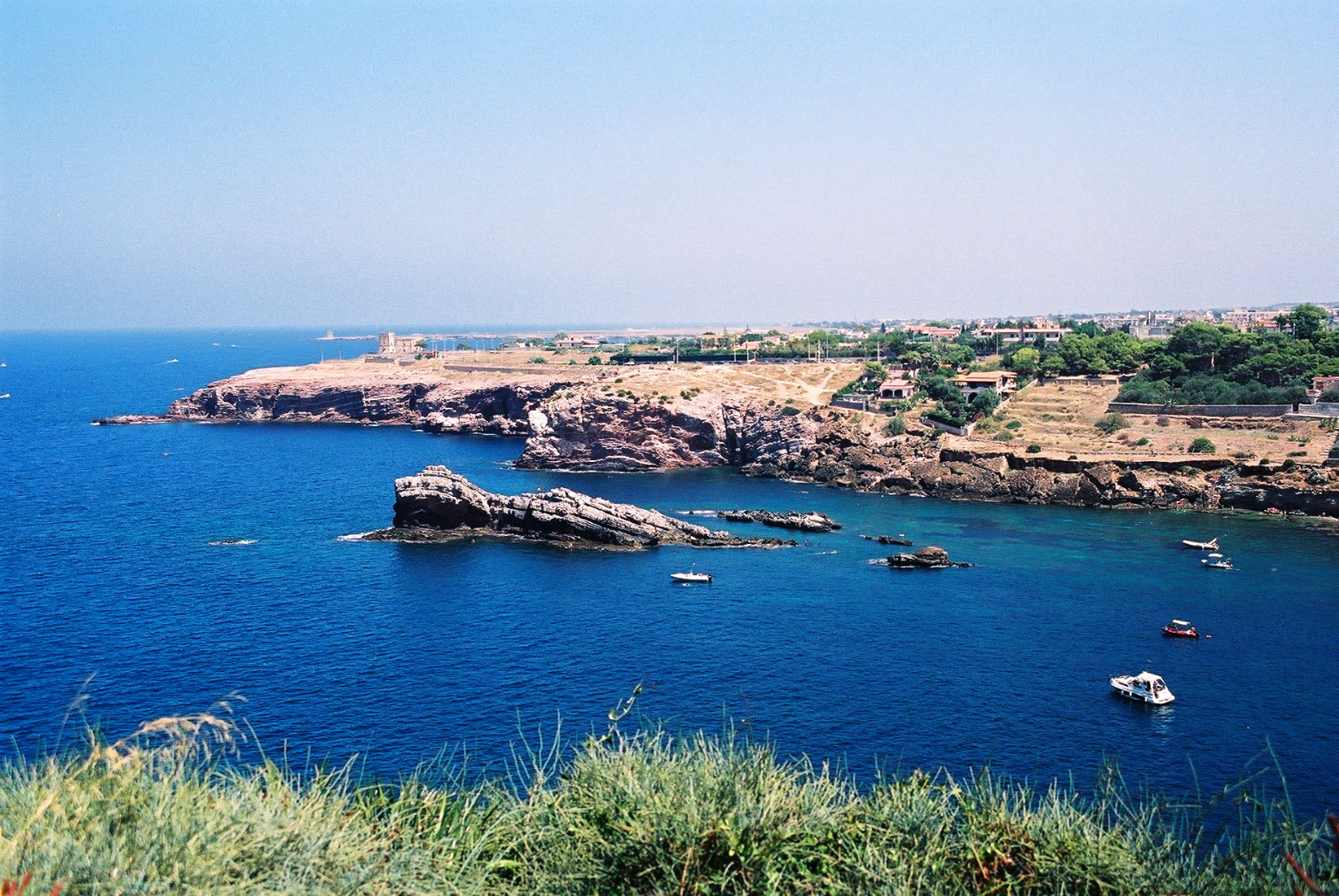
Calarossa Bay

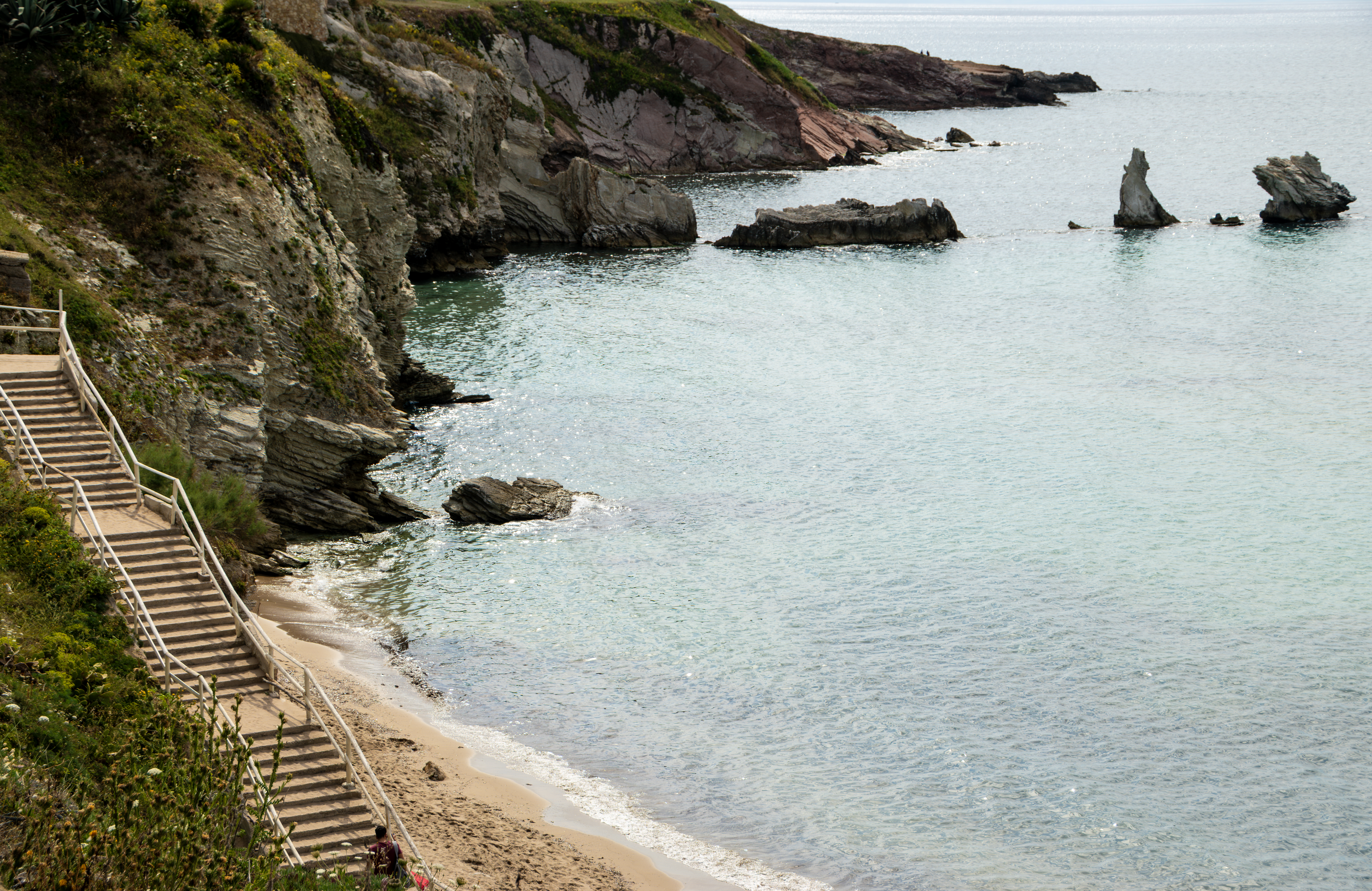
Seaside

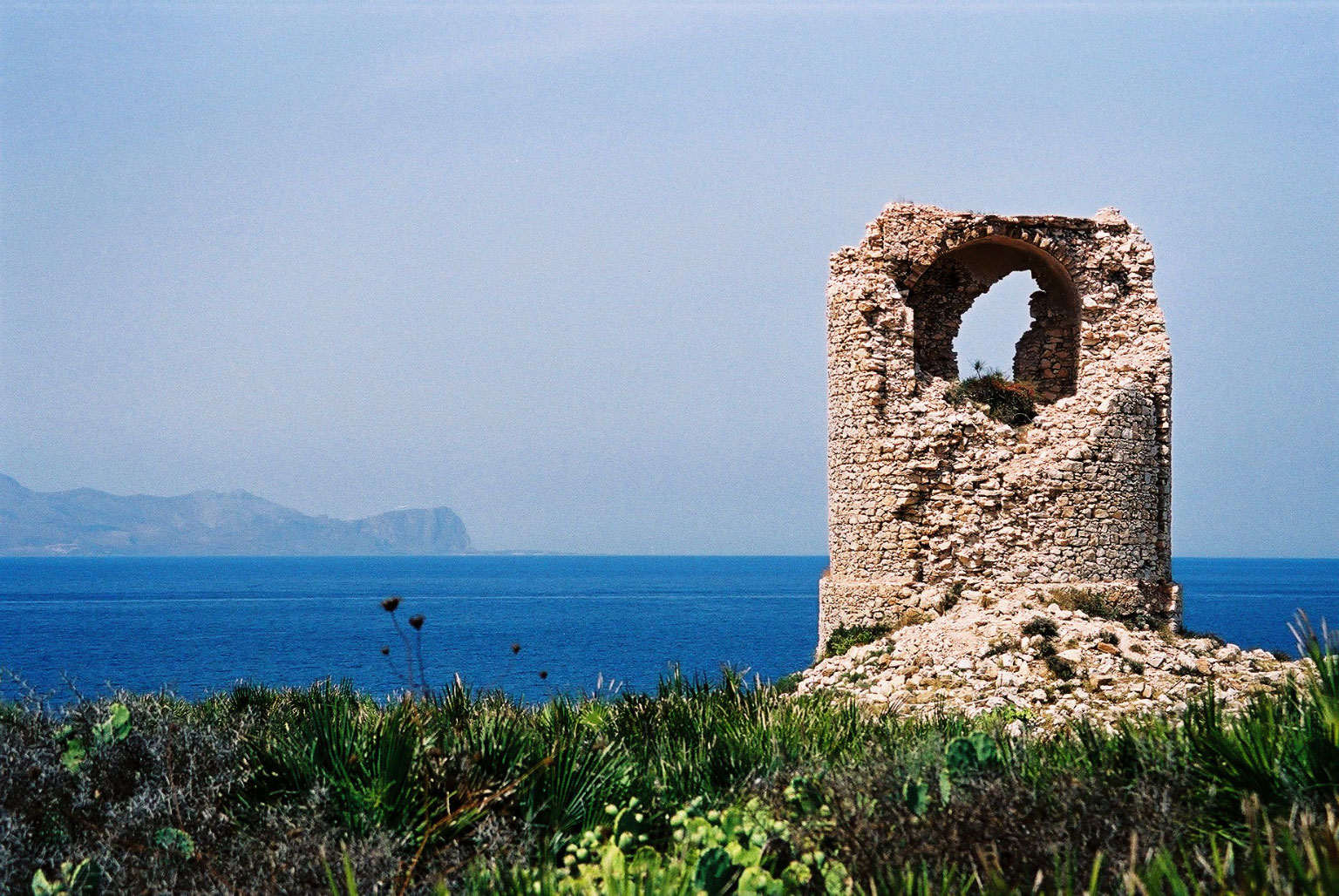
Torre di Capo Rama

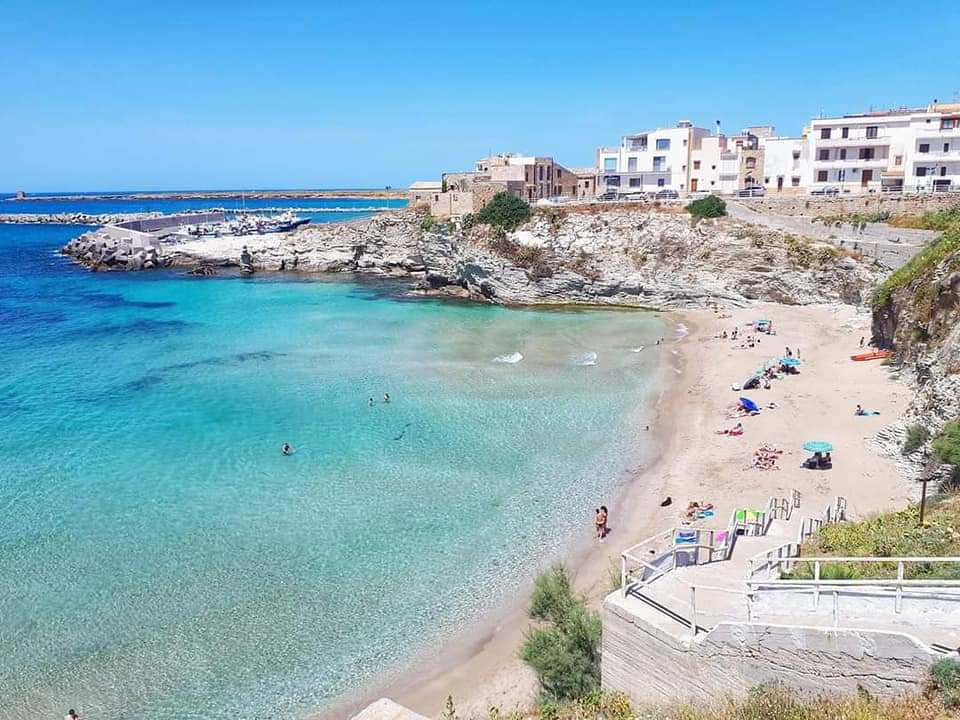
Seaside

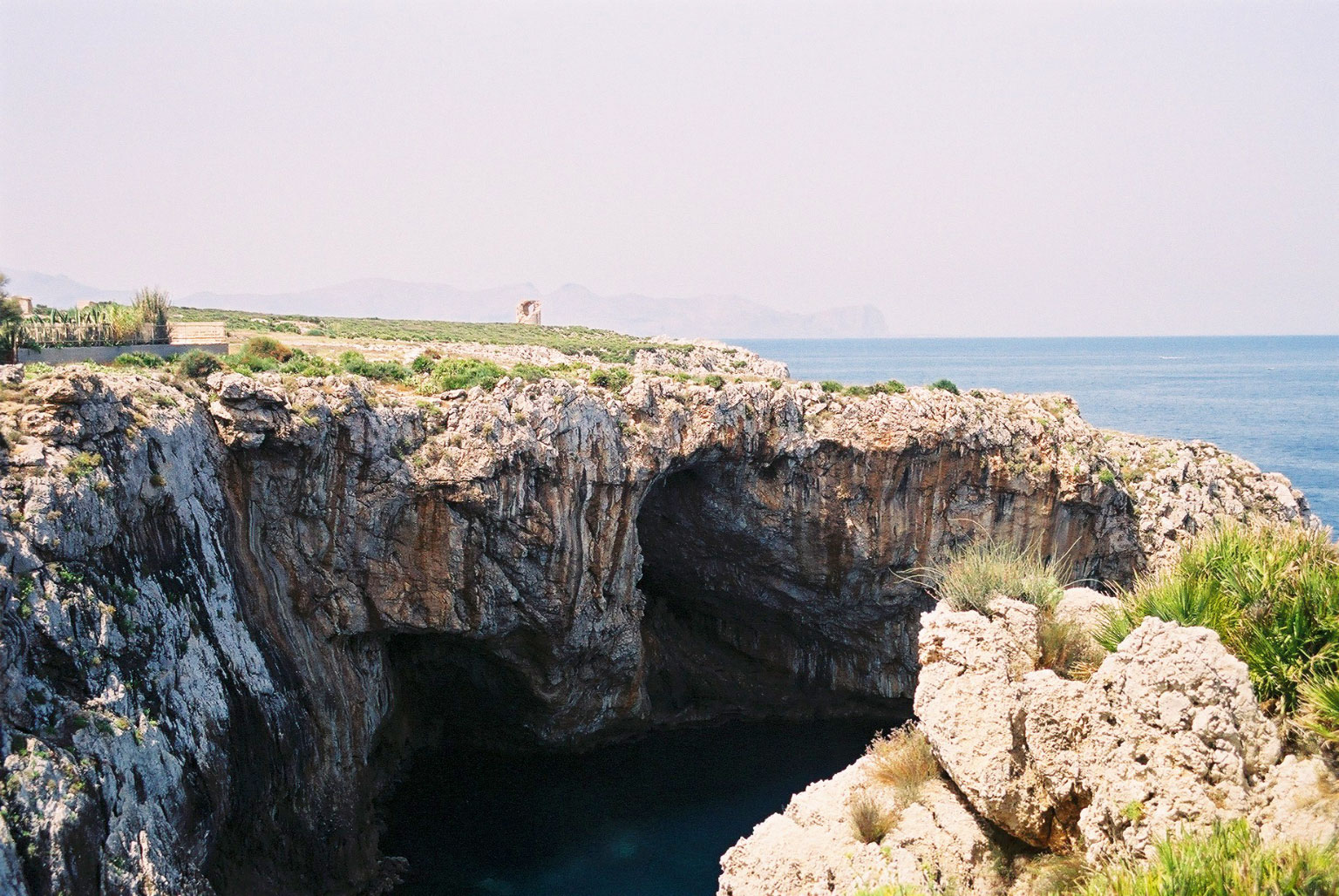
Cliffs with Grottoes
