= Cinisi =

Cinisi Cìnisi (Sicilian)
- Comune
- Comune di Cinisi
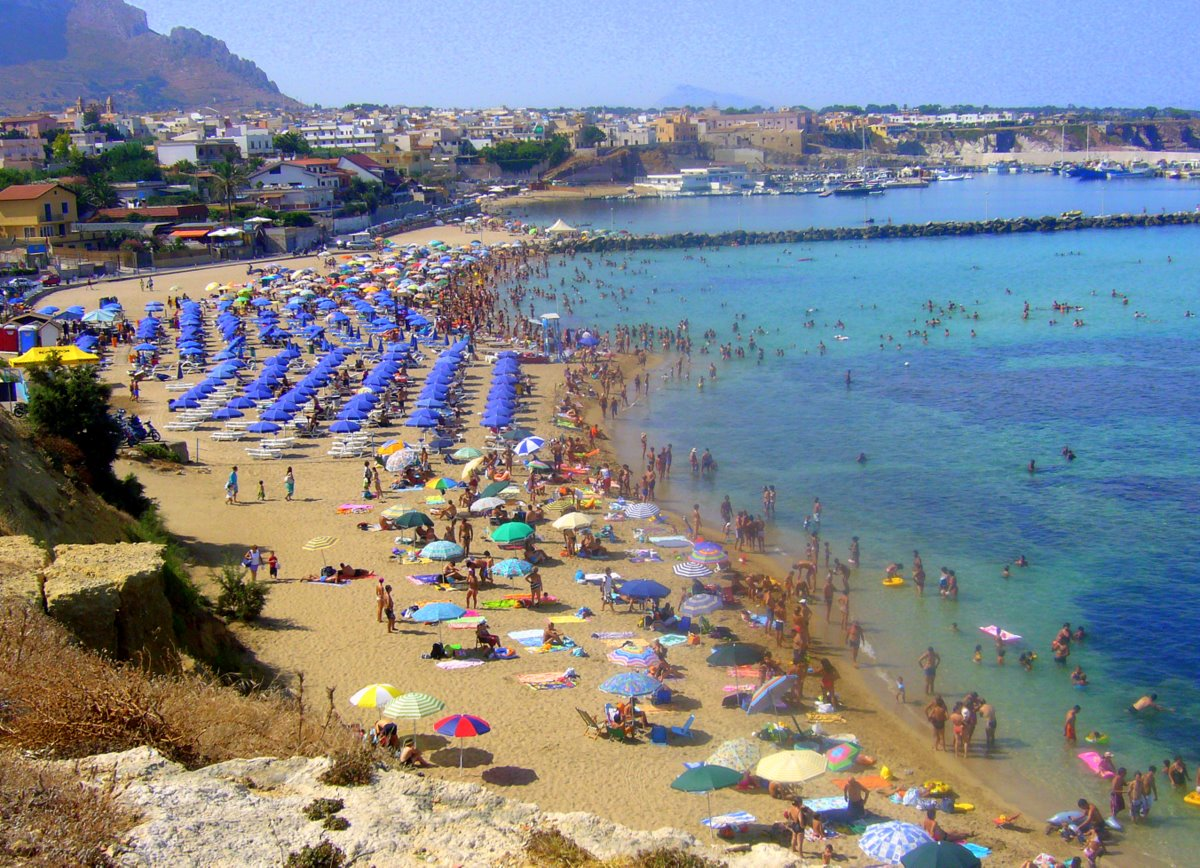
- Cinisi beach

- Location of Cinisi in the Province of Palermo

- Location of Cinisi in Italy Cinisi (Sicily)
- Coordinates: 38°10′N 13°6′E
- Country: Italy
- Region: Sicily
- Metropolitan city: Palermo (PA)
- Frazioni: Punta Raisi, Orsa, Pozzillo, Carini, Terrasini

Government
  - Mayor: Vera Abbate (Civic List)

Area
  - Total: 33.16 km^{2} (12.80 sq mi)
- Elevation: 75 m (246 ft)

Population (1-1-2022)
  - Total: 11,846
  - Density: 357.2/km^{2} (925.2/sq mi)
- Demonym: Cinisense(i)
- Time zone: UTC+1 (CET)
  - Summer (DST): UTC+2 (CEST)
- Postal code: 90045
- Dialing code: 091
- ISTAT code: 082031
- Patron saint: Santa Fara
- Website: Official website

Cinisi (Italian: [ˈtʃiːnizi]; Sicilian: Cìnisi [ˈtʃiːnɪsɪ]) is a town and a comune in the Metropolitan City of Palermo in Sicily. As of 1 January 2022 it has a population of 11,846.

== Geography ==
The town is part of the Palermo metropolitan area, it borders with the municipalities of Carini and Terrasini and it includes the civil parish (frazione) of Punta Raisi, the location of Palermo Airport. It is 36 kilometres (22 mi) from Palermo centre, 77 kilometres (48 mi) from Trapani and 31 kilometres (19 mi) from Alcamo.

=== Climate ===
Climate data for Cinisi (Punta Raisi Airport), elevation: 21 m or 69 ft, 1961-1990 normals, Extremes 1960-1990
Month	Jan	Feb	Mar	Apr	May	Jun	Jul	Aug	Sep	Oct	Nov	Dec	Year
Record high °C (°F)	25.6 (78.1)	29.4 (84.9)	34.7 (94.5)	34.6 (94.3)	40 (104)	44 (111)	43.1 (109.6)	42.4 (108.3)	40.6 (105.1)	35.2 (95.4)	31 (88)	26.7 (80.1)	44 (111)
Mean daily maximum °C (°F)	14.8 (58.6)	15.1 (59.2)	16.1 (61.0)	18.4 (65.1)	21.8 (71.2)	25.1 (77.2)	28.3 (82.9)	28.8 (83.8)	26.6 (79.9)	22.9 (73.2)	19.3 (66.7)	16.0 (60.8)	21.1 (70.0)
Daily mean °C (°F)	12.5 (54.5)	12.6 (54.7)	13.5 (56.3)	15.7 (60.3)	18.9 (66.0)	22.4 (72.3)	25.6 (78.1)	26.2 (79.2)	24.1 (75.4)	20.3 (68.5)	16.8 (62.2)	13.7 (56.7)	18.5 (65.4)
Mean daily minimum °C (°F)	10.2 (50.4)	10.1 (50.2)	10.9 (51.6)	12.9 (55.2)	16.0 (60.8)	19.7 (67.5)	22.9 (73.2)	23.6 (74.5)	21.5 (70.7)	17.8 (64.0)	14.3 (57.7)	11.5 (52.7)	16.0 (60.7)
Record low °C (°F)	1.4 (34.5)	2.4 (36.3)	2.4 (36.3)	5.8 (42.4)	9 (48)	13.3 (55.9)	16 (61)	17.9 (64.2)	13 (55)	8 (46)	5.1 (41.2)	1.6 (34.9)	1.4 (34.5)
Average precipitation mm (inches)	71.6 (2.82)	65.4 (2.57)	59.5 (2.34)	44.1 (1.74)	25.5 (1.00)	12.2 (0.48)	5.1 (0.20)	13.3 (0.52)	41.5 (1.63)	98.0 (3.86)	94.3 (3.71)	80.0 (3.15)	610.5 (24.02)
Average precipitation days	10	10	9	6	3	2	1	2	4	8	9	11	75
Average relative humidity (%)	73	72	72	72	72	71	69	71	72	71	70	73	72
Source 1: NOAA
Source 2: Altervista Extreme temperatures.

== Culture ==
Cinisi's cultural life revolves significantly around its central piazza, which serves as the location of communal activities. The town square hosts various events, from concerts and festivals to activities for both children and adults. Events held in the area include:

- Carnivale parade: The annual Carnivale features elaborately themed papier-mâché floats created by local citizens. These floats compete for the most impressive design and theme, and the event includes parades, DJ and BBQ/food floats, and dance performances along the main street "Corso Umberto I". The Carnivale's attendees occupy the town in elaborate costumes and masks. The festivities traditionally begin with "Lu Nannu (Grandpa)", a symbolic figure of the Carnivale, being paraded from the train station to the town center, accompanied by majorettes, drummers, and a marching band. On the final day, the floats are judged, and the creators of the best float receive a cash award, and the funeral of lu nannu is held (previously an effigy was burnt).
- Summer festivals: In the Summer, the piazza often becomes a venue for music festivals and concerts, where local and regional artists perform, providing entertainment for the community and tourists.
- Festival of the Madonna del Furi: Another event held locally is the celebration of the Madonna del Furi, featuring religious processions and festivities.

== Giuseppe Impastato ==
Famous anti-mafia activist Giuseppe Impastato was assassinated in Cinisi by the Mafia in 1978. Today, his boyhood home can be found on the main street of Cinisi, Corso Umberto I, and is open to tourists. The house displays evidence and tells the interesting and significant story of Impastato, or "Peppino", as some knew him, in his final years as he fought the Mafia. Cinisi also has landmarks and places related to Impastato's life that attract many school groups and writers.

== Demographics ==
- Note: 2007 estimation by The World Gazetteer.

== Transport ==
The Falcone-Borsellino Airport of Palermo, also known as Punta Raisi, is located in its municipal territory. Cinisi counts a pair of train stations (Cinisi-Terrasini on the Palermo-Trapani line and Punta Raisi, served by the Palermo metropolitan railway service) and is served by the A29 motorway.

== Personalities ==
- Giovanni Meli (1740–1815), Sicilian poet.
- Gaetano Badalamenti (1923–2004), leading Mafia figure held responsible for the murder of Giuseppe Impastato.
- Giuseppe Impastato (1948–1978), political activist against the Mafia. The 2000 film I cento passi, dedicated to him, was filmed in Cinisi.
