= Carini =

- Comune
- Comune di Carini
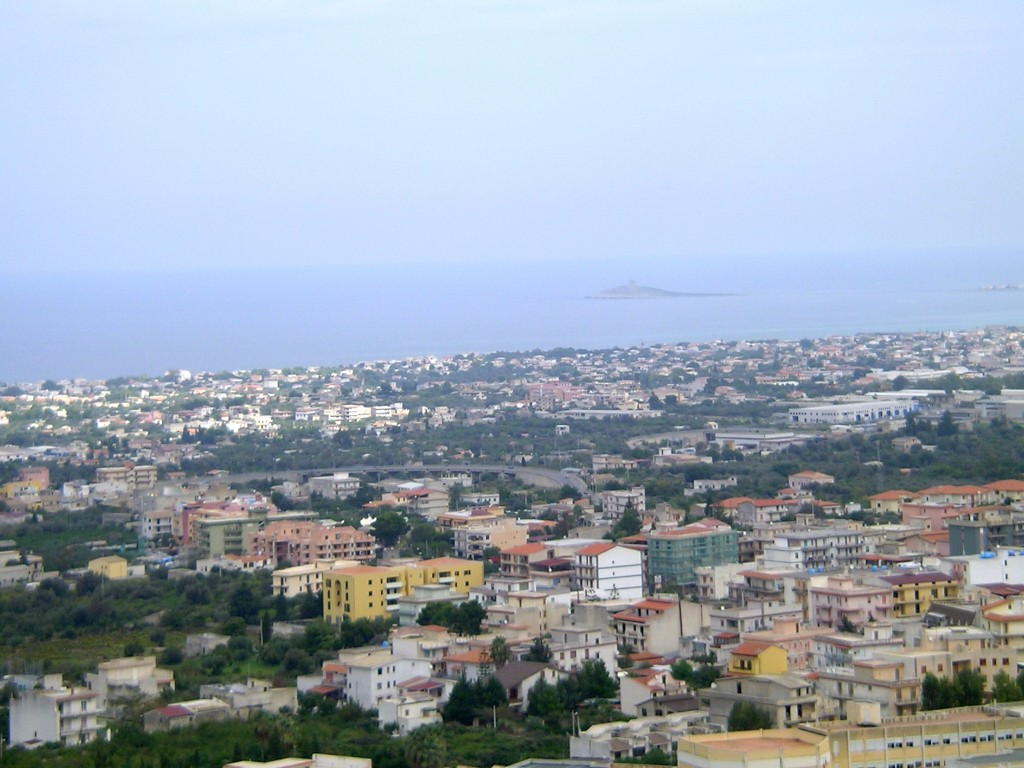
- View of Carini

- Location within Italy Location within Sicily
- Coordinates: 38°8′N 13°11′E
- Country: Italy
- Region: Sicily
- Metropolitan city: Palermo (PA)

Area
  - Total: 76.6 km^{2} (29.6 sq mi)

Population (2011)
  - Total: 38,000
  - Density: 500/km^{2} (1,300/sq mi)
- Time zone: UTC+1 (CET)
  - Summer (DST): UTC+2 (CEST)
- Website: Official website

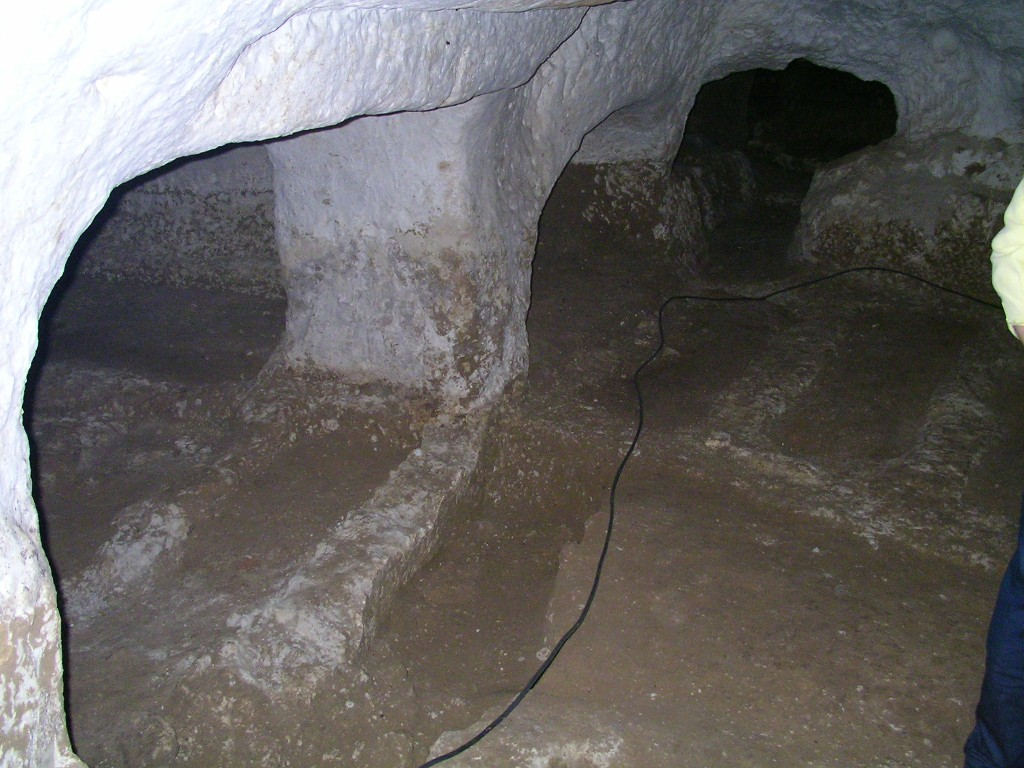
Catacombs of di Villagrazia

Carini (Latin: Hyccara or Hyccarum, Ancient Greek: Ὕκαρα and Ὕκαρον) is a city and comune in the Metropolitan City of Palermo, Sicily, 19 kilometres (12 mi) by rail west-northwest of Palermo. It has a population of 37,752.

== History ==
Timaeus, in the thirteenth book of his work Histories, said that it was called Hyccara because the first men who arrived there found a species of fishes which were called hycae (Ancient Greek: ὕκας).

Hyccara reached its maximum splendour in the second half of the 5th century BC. It became an important maritime emporium and was popular with the Phoenicians who brought numerous products and metals unknown to Sicily. War broke out between Athens and Syracuse after the Athenians came to Sicily to aid Segesta and Selinunte, enemies of Syracuse. In 415 BC Nicias with 5,000 Athenian warriors attacked and destroyed Hyccara. Its inhabitants were enslaved and sold at the Catania market, among them the girl Lais, who later became a famous courtesan in Corinth.

The Hyccarini who escaped the massacre and slavery built the second Hyccara (calling it Iccara) away from the sea nearer the mountains and among the woods in the locality now called San Nicola, around 370 BC. The territory was also colonised and inhabited by numerous Carthaginians, attracted by the fertility of the soil, to protect which they built the so-called Wall of Carini. The practice of agriculture and trade soon brought wealth to the city, where sumptuous houses were built, many of which had mosaic floors which still remain today. Under Roman rule, after the defeat of the Carthaginians (264 BC), a long period of peace followed, during which agriculture in particular flourished. The first important event, mentioned by the historians of Rome, is the stay of the emperor Antoninus Pius.

The Catacombs of Villagrazia are the largest in western Sicily which prove that a large early Christian community existed between the fourth and seventh centuries AD. It was also large enough support a bishopric complex nearby at San Nicola, probably connected to the large settlement there.

The first historical mention of a bishop of the see is in two letters of Pope Gregory the Great, in the 6th century, one addressed to Bonifacius of Reggio Calabria, the other to Barbarus of Carini. But many signs, including local catacombs, show that a Christian community existed at Carini from the 3rd century. A lead seal bears the name of a Felix, bishop of this see. One of Gregory the Great's letters show that the diocese was incorporated into that of Reggio Calabria in September 595, but by 602 it was again under its own bishop. A Bishop John of the see took part in a synod at Rome in 649. The last testimony to its existence dates from the 8th century, and the Muslim conquest of Sicily, which began in 827, brought it to an end as a residential bishopric. As a result, Carini/Hyccara/Hyccarum is today listed by the Catholic Church as a titular see.

== Archaeological areas ==
Given the history of the city and the many settlements in the area, Carini has numerous archaeological areas, where finds from various historical periods have been found:

- Archaeological Area Baglio-Carburangeli: consists of a strip of land, with an average extension of 150 m, which starting from the Baglio di Carini, extends for about one km to the south-west, skirting the coast in the first stretch and then continuing in the hinterland as far as the Carburangeli cave. Inside the pit tombs, now destroyed by the construction of some buildings, artifacts have been found that reveal the occupation of the territory since the third century BC The finds, partly preserved in the National Museum of Palermo, consist of funds of amphorae, lava stone millstones, fragments of oil lamps and a late Roman marble column base.
- Archaeological area contrada S. Nicola: during the excavations carried out in the area important finds from the Byzantine Roman era were found, including a basilica mosaic and a Byzantine coin from the Justinian age. Near the district, identified as the possible seat of the “Hyccara” described by Thucydides, on the coast east of Carburangeli, an area rich in 5th century BC ceramics was discovered.
- Archaeological area "Moscala": there are signs of an urban settlement, with traces of walls, blocks of worked tuff, tools and ceramic fragments from the 3rd, 4th, and 5th centuries BC.
- Archaeological area "Manico di Quarara": a necropolis of the Elima civilisation was found.
- Archaeological area "Ciachea": near the border between Capaci and Carini there is a vast necropolis, dating back to the Aeneolithic period, where the "Bicchiere di Carini" ceramic, unique in its manufacture, dated to 4,000 BC was found.

Of considerable importance are the catacombs found near Villagrazia di Carini, which extend for about 3,500 m^{2} and confirm the existence of a vast Christian community in the area and, probably, of a bishop's seat. Of considerable interest are the numerous caves distributed throughout the territory, which have allowed the discovery of numerous remains of prehistoric fauna.

== Tourism and retail ==
Tourism is an important part Carini's economy. Carini's lure for tourists is based mainly on shopping but also on its possession of other ancient and modern attractions. Carini has one of the biggest shopping areas in Sicily called the Zona Industriale where more than ten big shopping centres can be found. The Zona Industriale attracts people from the surrounding areas and beyond, especially during weekends and the summer season. Carini has two shopping malls, including one of sicily's largest, centro commerciale Poseidon. The other shopping mall is called Portobello - Le Gallerie del Risparmio.

== Military Architecture ==
Carini Castle

The building was erected in the late ninth and early twelfth century, certainly on a previous Arab construction, by the first Norman feudal lord Rodolfo Bonello, warrior in the retinue of Count Roger. The excavations carried out during the recent restoration, both in the east and in the north, they have surfaced walls of earlier times to the Norman. The castle has a large courtyard, where there is the residential structure made primarily in two elevations. The ground floor consists of: a room with a cross vault that contains a wall in stone, which originally served as the exterior wall. In this are visible windows and a pointed front door with splays of the old medieval structure; A large hall divided by two pointed arches with the central column; The private chapel contains a wooden tabernacle of the first decade of '600, with Corinthian columns that mark prospectively space. Outside the chapel, a portal giving access to the bastion, where the remains of a perimeter wall are visible. The second floor, reached by an outside stone staircase Billiemi, architect Matteo Carnalivari, comprises: the ballroom, classic example of fifteenth-century room with coffered wooden ceiling, fireplace adorned with the emblem of La Grua and large windows with leaning seats and from the sleeping area, composed of frescoed rooms. A small circular staircase leads to the kitchen, while another adjoining rooms on the upper floors. From the west side there is access to an area called "Foresteria." A staircase leads to the castle tower or male. The continuous tower with a wooden gallery from which a mullioned window with the emblem of Abbate can observe the south side of the country. The Abbate family commanded the castle from 1283 to 1397 after Palmerio Abbate campaigned with Geovanni Procida during the War of the Sicilian Vespers. The castle was then commanded by the La Grua Talamanca family. Here is the time to cruise with plumes also ending with Billiemi stone. A scale, which no longer exists, allowing the output to the battlements of the tower.

Coastal Defensive Towers

Torre Muzza, built in the seventeenth century and located on the coastal strip in Piraineto area;

Internal Defensive Towers to the Territory Franco tower, built in the seventeenth century and located close to the Villagrazia di Carini; Guardiola Tower, built in the seventeenth century and located near Zucco Fund; Tower of Life, built in the eighteenth century and located near the historic center

Defensive Towers Incorporated into Beams

Tower and trap Baglio, the first of which was built in the thirteenth century and incorporated in the beam in the sixteenth century, located on the coast in places Carborangeli; Tower and beam Chiachea, built in the sixteenth century and located on the coastal strip in locations Chiachea; Tower and beam Milioti, built in the sixteenth century and located near the coast in places Milioti; Tower and beam Aiello, built in the eighteenth century and located near the village of Olives Park; The farm Zucco, complex built in the eighteenth century, surrounded by four towers, known for its wines.

== Main sights ==
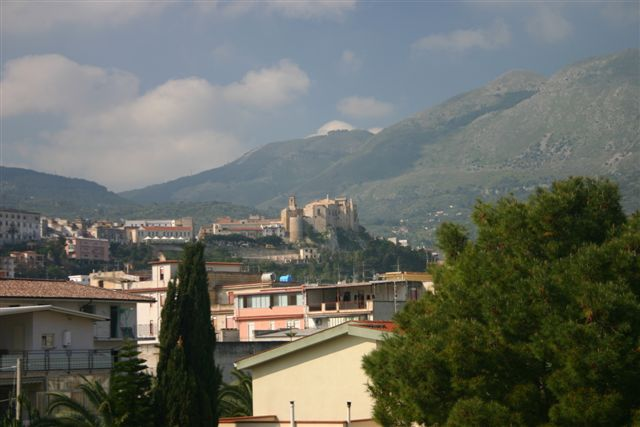
View of 'Il Castello di Carini'

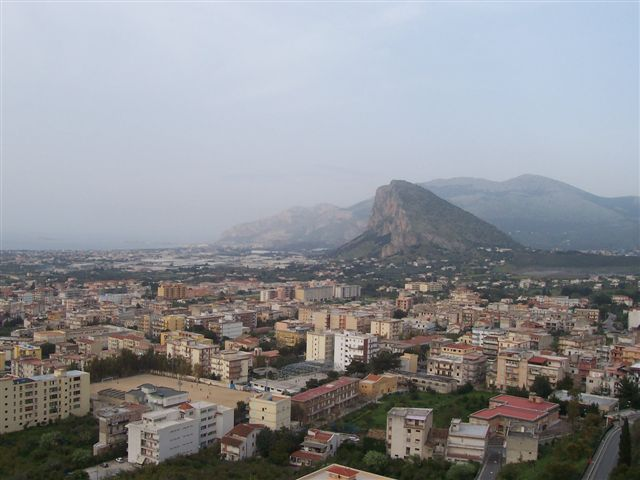
View of the town from 'Il Castello di Carini'

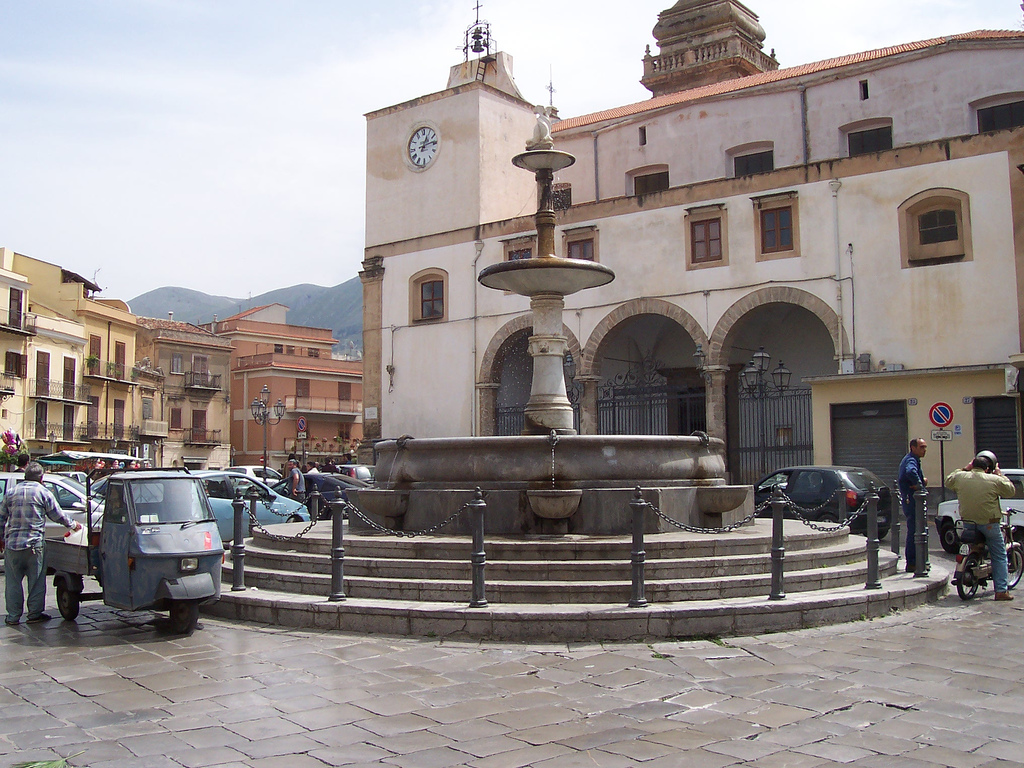
View of the 'Piazza Duomo' and 'La Chiesa Madre'

== Noted Natives ==
Vido Musso (January 17, 1913 -January 9, 1982 (Rancho Mirage, California). Jazz tenor saxophonist, clarinetist, bandleader. ' Teen Age Dance Party ' LP, 1957: Crown Records: CLP5029. Actor Doug McClure on cover. Frank (Franco) Cutietta (Actor/Photographer portrayed physicist Enrico Fermi in Fat Man and Little Boy (L'ombra di mille soli), alongside Paul Newman and other celebrated actors).
