= Calcedonio Di Pisa =

Member of the Sicilian Mafia

- Born: 11 October 1931; Palermo, Sicily, Kingdom of Italy
- Died: 26 December 1962 (aged 31); Palermo, Sicily, Italy
- Cause of death: Shot and killed by rival Mafia faction
- Other name: Doruccio
- Known for: Di Pisa's murder triggered the outbreak of the First Mafia War
- Allegiance: Noce Mafia family / Sicilian Mafia

Calcedonio Di Pisa (Italian pronunciation: [kaltʃeˈdɔːnjo di ˈpiːsa, - ˈpiːza]; 11 October 1931 – 26 December 1962), also known as Doruccio, was a member of the Sicilian Mafia. He was the boss of the Mafia family in the Noce neighbourhood in Palermo and sat on the first Sicilian Mafia Commission, the coordinating body of Cosa Nostra in Sicily. Di Pisa's murder in 1962 triggered the outbreak of the First Mafia War.

== Mafia career ==
Di Pisa was born in Palermo. He was described by British author Norman Lewis in "The Honoured Society" as "a garish young freebooter, habitually begloved, shirted in a puce silk and with a coat of the palest camel hair – a kind of latter-day George Raft. He drove a butter-coloured, gadget-festooned Alfa Romeo, and with his dandified presence he was anathema to the mafiosi of the old school …." Di Pisa was a contrabandist in cigarettes and was actively involved in the flourishing real-estate racket, known as the Sack of Palermo, during the reign of Salvo Lima as mayor of Palermo. He was known as one of the ablest emissaries of the Mafia in Palermo in the field of tobacco smuggling and drug trafficking.

Di Pisa was present at a series of meetings in the hotel Delle Palme and the Spanò seafood restaurant between top Italian-American and Sicilian mafiosi in Palermo on 12–16 October 1957. Joseph Bonanno, Lucky Luciano, John Bonventre, Frank Garofalo, Santo Sorge and Carmine Galante were among the American mafiosi present, while among the Sicilian side were Salvatore "Ciaschiteddu" Greco and his cousin Salvatore Greco, known as "l'ingegnere" or "Totò il lungo", Giuseppe Genco Russo, Angelo La Barbera, Gaetano Badalamenti, Totò Minore and Tommaso Buscetta.

Di Pisa was killed on 26 December 1962, on the Piazza Principe di Camporeale in Palermo while walking to a tobacco kiosk. Three men shot him with a sawn-off shotgun and a revolver. None of the bystanders on the square could even recall hearing any shots when questioned by the police.

== First Mafia War ==
Di Pisa's murder triggered the outbreak of the First Mafia War. The conflict erupted over an underweight shipment of heroin. The shipment was financed by Cesare Manzella, the Greco cousins from Ciaculli and the La Barbera brothers (Angelo and Salvatore) from Palermo Centre. Suspicion of double-crossing fell on Di Pisa, who had collected the heroin for Manzella from the Corsican supplier, Pascal Molinelli, and had organised the transport to Manzella's partners in New York.

Di Pisa was summoned to appear before the Sicilian Mafia Commission but managed to convince most of the members that he was not guilty. However, the La Barbera brothers contested the decision, and they were suspected of being behind the murder of Di Pisa and Manzella. The disagreement led to a bloody conflict between the Grecos and the La Barberas. The war ended with the Ciaculli massacre which changed the Mafia war into a war against the Mafia. It prompted the first concerted anti-mafia efforts by the state in post-war Italy. The Sicilian Mafia Commission was dissolved and of those mafiosi who had escaped arrest, many went abroad.

Only later did it become clear that Mafia boss Michele Cavataio had killed Di Pisa, according to Tommaso Buscetta after he became a cooperating witness in 1984. Cavataio had lost out to the Grecos in a war of the wholesale market in the mid-1950s. Cavataio killed Di Pisa in the knowledge that the La Barberas would be blamed by the Grecos and a war would be the result. He kept fueling the war through other bomb attacks and killings.

== Sources ==
- (in Italian) Catanzaro, Raimondo (1988). Il delitto come impresa. Storia sociale della mafia, Milan: Rizzoli, ISBN 978-8876755347
- Dickie, John (2004). Cosa Nostra. A history of the Sicilian Mafia, London: Coronet, ISBN 0-340-82435-2
- Lewis, Normann (1967) [1964]. The Honoured Society: The Sicilian Mafia Observed, Harmondsworth: Penguin Books ISBN 0-907871-48-8
- Lupo, Salvatore (2009). History of the Mafia, New York: Columbia University Press, ISBN 978-0-231-13134-6
- Servadio, Gaia (1976), Mafioso. A history of the Mafia from its origins to the present day, London: Secker & Warburg ISBN 0-436-44700-2
- Shawcross, Tim & Martin Young (1987). Men Of Honour: The Confessions Of Tommaso Buscetta, Glasgow: Collins ISBN 0-00-217589-4
- Sterling, Claire (1990). Octopus. How the long reach of the Sicilian Mafia controls the global narcotics trade, New York: Simon & Schuster, ISBN 0-671-73402-4.
- Stille, Alexander (1995). Excellent Cadavers. The Mafia and the Death of the First Italian Republic, New York: Vintage ISBN 0-09-959491-9
