= Santo Sorge =

Member of the Sicilian Mafia

Santo Sorge (Mussomeli, January 11, 1908 – New York, May 1972) was a Sicilian Mafioso living in the United States. His exact role has never been very clear; he was one of the great 'unknowns' of the Sicilian and American Mafia. He was one of the highest-level Sicilian Mafia leaders in his time. His counsel was sought in important decisions affecting the American Mafia as well. He traveled extensively between Italy and the United States.

== Mafia career ==
Sorge was a relative of Sicilian Mafia boss Giuseppe Genco Russo. His first problems with the judicial authorities go back to 1928 in his hometown Mussomeli for brawling and grievous bodily harm. The charges were dismissed when the peasant accusing him retracted, offering his apologies for causing trouble. In 1932 he was convicted in Paris (France) to six months' incarceration and a fine of 1,200 French francs for forgery and using a false passport. A year later he was convicted in Ghent (Belgium) to five months and 20,000 Belgian francs for fraud.

Other sentences for fraud and bad checks followed in Palermo in 1937 and in Turin in 1939. In 1948 he was convicted to three years and four months on unclear charges for 'political conspiracy' in Florence (probably related to espionage). Meanwhile, he moved to the United States. He became a naturalized US citizen living in New York City, and maintained a respectable front in America, through directorships in front companies such as Rimrock International Oil Company of New York and the Foreign Economic Research Association.

== Lieutenant of Luciano ==
He was considered to be a lieutenant of Lucky Luciano in the post-World War II heroin business, trafficking heroin produced in France by Corsican gangsters to the US. The opium needed to produce the heroin was cultivated in Turkey and Iran. The opium was processed into morphine base, after it was transported across Syria into Lebanon. From Beirut, Lebanon, or Aleppo, Syria, the morphine base was shipped to clandestine laboratories in France for conversion into heroin.

Sorge, an articulate and well looking man with a good education, was probably in charge of moving the money. Owing to his friendship with Genco Russo, he had the right high political contacts in Italy, even among government members. He used companies in the US, Sicily and Panama.

== Grand Hotel des Palmes Mafia meeting ==
Sorge was present at series of meetings between top American and Sicilian mafiosi that took place in Palermo between October 12–16, 1957, in the Grand Hotel Delle Palme in Palermo. Joseph Bonanno, Lucky Luciano, John Bonventre, Frank Garofalo and Carmine Galante were among the American Mafiosi present, while among the Sicilian side there were Salvatore "Ciaschiteddu" Greco and his cousin Salvatore "The Engineer" Greco, Giuseppe Genco Russo, Angelo La Barbera, Gaetano Badalamenti, Calcedonio Di Pisa, Totò Minore and Tommaso Buscetta.

According to some, one of the main topics on the agenda was the organization of the heroin trade on an international basis. The FBI believed it was this meeting that established the Bonanno crime family in the heroin trade. Sorge apparently was key to the meeting, which did not start before he arrived in Palermo, although Bonanno, Bonventre and Galante had already spent some days in Sicily. The meeting ended when Sorge left Palermo.

== Indicted ==
In August 1965, Sorge and 16 others associated with the Sicilian and American Mafia were indicted in Palermo by judge Aldo Vigneri for criminal conspiracy and narcotics and currency rackets in relation with 1957 meeting. Also indicted were Joe Bonanno, John Bonventre, Carmine Galante, Gaspare Magaddino, John Priziola, Raffaele Quasarano, Frank Coppola and Joe Adonis. Sorge was never arrested although Italy sought his extradition. The case against the accused was dismissed for insufficient evidence in June 1968.

In 1967, Sorge sued the city of New York and two retired senior New York police men, John F. Shaney and Ralph Salerno of the NYPD's special unit on organized crime, in a defamation and libel case asking US$418,000 in damages. Salerno had testified in 1965 before judge Vigneri of the Palermo Criminal Court, that Sorge had close relationships with Luciano, Vito Genovese, Galante and Bonanno.

== Top Mafia boss ==
According to Sorge the retired officers provided false information, who admitted that they could not prove their allegations with certainty. According to Salerno, Sorge "was interested in Cosa Nostra in general for which he maintains public relations." The libel suit was dismissed in March 1968. Sorge also brought a libel suit against Parade Publications for US$1.16 million on the basis of a magazine article by Jack Anderson published on January 21, 1962, which had said that Sorge was listed by Harry Anslinger, the former Commissioner of the Federal Bureau of Narcotics, as the number five boss in the top ten bosses of the American underworld.

Judge Vigneri had also gone to visit Mafia turncoat Joe Valachi, who told him: "I know Santo Sorge and I know he belongs to the Cosa Nostra. It is my personal knowledge that his function was to go and come from America to Italy and vice-versa, carrying out tasks that I don't know. I was never able to understand to what family he belongs. He was a close friend of all Cosa Nostra bosses." He was very close with Carlo Gambino, the head of the Gambino crime family in New York City.
