= Grand Hotel et des Palmes Mafia meeting =

Meetings between Sicilian Mafia and American Mafia members

A series of meetings between Sicilian Mafia and American Mafia members were allegedly held at the Grand Hotel et des Palmes in Palermo, Sicily, between October 12–16, 1957. Also called the 1957 Palermo Mafia summit, the gathering allegedly discussed the transatlantic illegal heroin trade between the American and the Sicilian Mafia. The FBI believed it was this meeting that established the Bonanno crime family from New York in the heroin trade.

== Origins of reputed purpose ==
This "heroin summit" was described by journalist Claire Sterling: "Although there is no firsthand evidence of what went on at the four-day summit itself, what followed over the next thirty years has made the substance clear. Authorities on both sides of the Atlantic are persuaded by now that the American delegation asked the Sicilians to take over the import and distribution of heroin in the United States, and the Sicilians agreed." However, she fails to back this claim with solid evidence, and even has the dates of the alleged meeting wrong.

At the time, although the Sicilian Mafia was involved to some extent in the heroin business in the 1950s and 1960s, it never had anything more than a secondary role. According to the McClellan Hearings, Sicily was no more than a staging-post in the shipment of French-produced heroin to the US. Sicilian mafiosi did not acquire an oligopoly on the transatlantic heroin market until the 1970s, because they were not initially competitive compared to other criminal groups, in particular the French Connection by Corsican groups in Marseille.

The first mention of the "summit" in the United States was during the McClellan Hearings on October 10–16, 1963. Among the American mafiosi present were Joe Bonanno, his underbosses and advisors Carmine Galante, John Bonventre and Frank Garofalo, as well as Lucky Luciano, Santo Sorge, John Di Bella, Vito Vitale and Gaspare Magaddino. While among the Sicilian side there were Salvatore "Little Bird" Greco and his cousin Salvatore Greco, also known as "l'ingegnere" or "Totò il lungo", Giuseppe Genco Russo, Vincenzo Rimi and Filippo Rimi, Angelo La Barbera, Gaetano Badalamenti, Totò Minore, Rosario Mancino, Calcedonio Di Pisa, Cesare Manzella, Gioacchino Pennino and Tommaso Buscetta.

== No first-hand accounts ==
There are no first-hand accounts of the meeting, except for the version of Mafia turncoat Tommaso Buscetta, who denied a summit ever took place at all. According to Buscetta, Bonanno did stay at the Grand Hotel des Palmes and received many guests all the time, but there was no summit as such. In his memoirs, Joe Bonanno mentions his trip to Palermo, but says nothing about a summit. Professor Alfred W. McCoy does not mention the summit in his landmark book The Politics of Heroin in Southeast Asia, a detailed account of the heroin trade after World War II.

According to Buscetta a gathering took place in a private room at the Spanò seafood restaurant on the evening of October 12, 1957, where Bonanno was fêted as the guest of honour by his old friend Lucky Luciano. Among the other guests were Bonanno's underboss Carmine Galante, the brothers Salvatore and Angelo La Barbera, Salvatore "Little Bird" Greco, Gaetano Badalamenti, Gioacchino Pennino, Cesare Manzella, Rosario Mancino, Filippo and Vincenzo Rimi, and Tommaso Buscetta. According to Buscetta, it was at this dinner that Bonanno suggested to form a Sicilian Mafia Commission to avoid violent disputes, following the example of the American Mafia that had formed their Commission in the 1930s.

The Italian police had been following Luciano and in so doing found out about the meetings. They observed the gatherings. However, the report was buried in some filing cabinet in Palermo. A copy was sent to the Federal Bureau of Narcotics in Washington. Only eight years later the report was used to indict the participants and some of their associates in Palermo.

== Trial against participants ==
In August 1965, the Palermo public prosecutors issued 14 arrest warrants and arrested 10 defendants all over Italy at the crack of dawn. Among those arrested were Genco Russo, Garafolo and Frank Coppola. They were charged with criminal conspiracy and narcotics and currency rackets and tobacco smuggling and had been present at the 1957 Palermo summit.

In the end, 17 Sicilians and Italo-Americans associated with the Sicilian and American Mafia were indicted by judge Aldo Vigneri for criminal conspiracy and narcotics and currency rackets. Among the indicted were Bonanno, Bonventre, Galante, Sorge, Magaddino, John Priziola, Raffaele Quasarano, Frank Coppola and Joe Adonis. The trial began on 14 March 1968, after a five-year investigation that uncovered a transatlantic drug trafficking network operating since 1957. Judge Vigneri had travelled to the U.S. to interrogate Joe Valachi, the first member of the Italian-American Mafia to testify against the organisation. The Court of Palermo dismissed the charges in June 1968 because of lack of evidence.

== Status as heroin summit ==
What can be said about the events in October 1957 in Palermo is that the gatherings reforged the links between the most Sicilian of the American Five Families, the Bonanno Crime Family, and the most American of the Sicilian Mafia families. It was not a conference between "the" Sicilian Mafia and "the" American Cosa Nostra as such, according to historian John Dickie. Rather than a diplomatic summit, it was a business convention where heroin trafficking between these two groups might have been discussed, but there certainly was not a general agreement on the heroin trade between "the" Sicilian Mafia and "the" American Cosa Nostra.

In his testimonies to judge Giovanni Falcone, Buscetta, questioned nearly three decades later and the only participant in the meetings who has spoken publicly about it, consistently avoided the topic of heroin trafficking and his potential involvement in it, and denied that any meeting ever took place. Unsurprisingly, both Bonanno and Luciano did not mention a meeting in their memoirs. That said, the amount of arrests and heroin seizures in the years after Bonanno's sojourn in Palermo did rise significantly.

The important result of 1957 Palermo gatherings was that the Sicilian Mafia composed its first Sicilian Mafia Commission and appointed "Little Bird" Greco as its first "primus inter pares".

== See also ==
- Atlantic City Conference, 1929
- Havana Conference, 1946
- La Stella Restaurant meeting, 1966
