= 1960s Sicilian Mafia trials =

Trials in Italy

The 1960s Sicilian Mafia trials took place at the end of that decade in response to a rise in organized crime violence around the late 1950s and early 1960s. There were three major trials, each featuring multiple defendants, that saw hundreds of alleged Mafiosi on trial for dozens of crimes. From the authority's point of view, they were a failure; very few defendants were convicted, although later trials as well as information from pentiti confirmed most of those acquitted were Mafiosi members, and were guilty of many crimes including some of those they were acquitted of.

Emanuele Notarbartolo was stabbed to death on a train in 1893. A number of suspected Mafiosi were rounded up and tried in 1900 of the murder, and though convicted they were acquitted on appeal due to a minor technicality. In the 1920s, Cesare Mori was sent to Sicily by Benito Mussolini to combat the Mafia, although Mori's crude method of imprisoning thousands of men – many of them innocent – without trial meant the Mafia were able to swiftly reestablish themselves as before once Mori had departed.

In the late 1950s, there was an increase in violence around the town of Corleone as rival factions in the local Mafia clan, the group around Michele Navarra and the Corleonesi, battled it out. More significantly there were a wave of murders and car bombings in and around Palermo in the First Mafia War that started in 1962. The event that triggered a major crackdown against the Mafia was the Ciaculli massacre, when seven police officers were killed on 30 June 1963, whilst trying to defuse a car bomb left by one group of mobsters who had actually intended it to kill some rival mobsters. The death of the policemen caused an outcry. In Octopus (see References), author Claire Sterling quotes the regional army commander for Sicily, General Aldo De Marco as ordering his men to: "Get everybody with a criminal record and throw them into jail, on my orders. Torture them and see what they let out, or shoot them on sight. I'll go to prison. But we can't go on like this."

A crackdown – albeit not quite as disregarding of civil liberties as General Aldo De Marco initially requested – did indeed follow, and during the mid-1960s, 1,995 suspected Mafiosi were arrested and charged with hundreds of crimes. It took many trials to process the accused, including three major ones.

== First trial ==
Giuseppe Genco Russo

The first trial opened in 1967 and concentrated on the growing involvement of the Sicilian Mafia in the international heroin trade. Specifically, the defendants were all those who had been at a series of meetings in October 1957 between American and Sicilian Mafiosi at the Grand Hotel Des Palmes in Palermo. The meeting was about heroin, with the Americans apparently not keen on getting too involved in drugs due to the lengthy sentences for trafficking, whilst the Sicilians were apparently all for it. At the time, authorities did not know of the decision the two organisations came to (which was for the Sicilians to import and distribute heroin into the US, with their American counterparts taking a slice of the profits), but they were aware it concerned trafficking heroin. (The meeting also concluded that, following the American model, the Sicilians should start up their own commission.)

Amongst the defendants were Gaetano Badalamenti, Tommaso Buscetta and Giuseppe Genco Russo. They were mostly charged with Organized Delinquency, an old law that was the nearest prosecutors had to a charge of being a Mafiosi (many in authority—whether out of naivety or otherwise—denied the existence of the Mafia in the 1960s, and in fact it was not until 1982 that being a member of the Mafia became a formal crime.)

All the Americans at the meeting, including Joseph Bonanno and Carmine Galante, were indicted, but none were extradited because the US had no such criminal charge of Organized Delinquency. Charles "Lucky" Luciano, who was the principal organizer of the meeting, would have stood trial but he had since died of natural causes.

The prosecutors did not have a great deal of evidence at the trial, principally relying on information from Joseph Valachi, an American Mafiosi who began co-operating with the government in 1962. As a low-level mobster, Valachi was not at the Grand Hotel Des Palmes meeting, but he was aware of the growing heroin trade and the Sicilian Mafia's involvement in it. The police had also put those at the meeting under surveillance at the time and for months afterwards in the hope of collecting evidence that they were dealing in narcotics.

The evidence was still thin on the ground and at the conclusion of the trial in August 1968 every single defendant was acquitted.

== Trial of the 114 ==
Overlapping the above trial was the Trial of the 114, so-called because it featured 114 defendants. This trial took place in Catanzaro on the Italian mainland, partly due to there being no facilities for such a large trial in Sicily and also in the hope of minimizing intimidation of witnesses. Anti-Mafia judge Cesare Terranova signed the order to send the men to trial in 1965, ruling that the crimes and those accused of carrying them out were all linked and should be tried as an organized body.

The defendants were accused of crimes relating to the First Mafia War, the charges including multiple murder, kidnapping, tobacco smuggling, theft, "public massacre" (the Ciaculli bombing) and Organized Delinquency.

Amongst those on trial were the heads of the opposing factions in the Mafia War, Salvatore Greco and Angelo La Barbera, as well as the man who had actually triggered the war by framing La Barbera, Michele Cavataio. Also there were Giuseppe Calò and Luciano Leggio.

The trial opened in December 1967 and lasted until 22 December 1968. It resulted in ten convictions, with several of those being just for Organized Delinquency. This only carried a sentence of a few years, and most of those convicted of it were released instantly thanks to time already served.

The longest sentence was handed to Angelo La Barbera, who was given twenty-two-years for ordering the kidnap and murder of two rival mobsters who had vanished in 1963 after they were seen being bundled off the streets; someone who witnessed the kidnapping testified for the prosecution despite death threats, one of the few witnesses to do so. Tommaso Buscetta was given a thirteen-year sentence for kidnapping the men but his conviction was in absentia because he was not present at the trial. He had fled Sicily after the Ciaculli Massacre to avoid the inevitable crackdown. Buscetta was captured in Brazil in 1973 and sent back to Sicily to serve his sentence. Salvatore Greco was also convicted in absentia. No-one was found guilty of the Ciaculli Massacre.

Amongst the 104 defendants acquitted was Luciano Leggio. It is not known for certain what role – if any – he played in the First Mafia War, although he spent a lot of time in Palermo in the early 1960s and was apparently friends with Salvatore Greco.

== Corleonesi trial ==
Leggio would play a significant role in the third trial which began in February 1969, just two-months after the end of the Trial of the 114. This trial, which took place once again on the Italian mainland, in the town of Bari, had sixty-four defendants, all from the town of Corleone.

The charges related to a Mafia War in Corleone that started in 1958 when the local Mafia boss Michele Navarra was gunned down by Leggio and his men and lasted five-years, resulting in over fifty murders, as Leggio and his faction battled it out with Navarra's supporters. Leggio, who was victorious and now the new Corleonesi Boss, was the key defendant, charged with murdering nine people, including Navarra. Amongst his co-defendants was his eventual successor, Salvatore Riina, also accused of Navarra's slaying.

Bernardo Provenzano should have stood trial too, having been indicted for triple murder in 1963, but he had somehow escaped the police dragnet, something he managed to do until 2006.

The prosecutor was once again Cesare Terranova, who had made it clear that he was intent on putting Leggio away for good.

As was the case in all three trials, the defendants pleaded innocent and insisted they were not members of any Mafia, and that they had never heard of such an organization. When Leggio took the stand he made the rather strange claim that he was being framed by a police officer who had "begged me repeatedly to pleasure his wife; and I, for moral reasons, refused...Please don't ask me for names, I am a gentleman." He and some other defendants did, however, admit to the minor crime of dealing on the black market during World War II.

There was significant evidence tampering during the trial. For example, fragments of a broken car light found at the Navarra murder scene which had been identified as belonging to an Alfa Romeo car owned by Leggio had, by the time of the trial, been replaced by bits of a broken light from a completely different make of car.

As the jury retired in July, they and the judge received an anonymous note that read:

To the President of the Court of Assizes of Bari and members of the Jury:

You people in Bari have not understood, or rather, you don't want to understand, what Corleone means. You are judging honest gentlemen of Corleone, denounced through caprice by the Carabinieri and police.

We simply want to warn you that if a single gentleman from Corleone is convicted, you will be blown sky high, you will be wiped out, you will be butchered and so will every member of your family.

We think we've been clear. Nobody must be convicted. Otherwise you will be condemned to death – you and your families.

A Sicilian proverb says: "A man warned is a man saved". It's up to you. Be wise.

All sixty-four defendants were acquitted.

Cesare Terranova successfully appealed the acquittal of the "gentlemen from Corleone" so many, including Leggio and Riina, had to go into hiding almost as soon as they were released. Leggio was retried in absentia for the Navarra murder in 1970, and this time found guilty, but it was four years before he could be captured and sent off to serve his life sentence.

Salvatore Riina, also convicted in absentia at a second trial for murdering Navarra, remained a fugitive until 1993.

== Aftermath ==
Many of the prosecutors and judges involved in the trials, including Terranova, complained that the political will from Rome to prosecute the Mafia that followed the after the Ciaculli Massacre had evaporated by the end of the 1960s, leaving prosecutors on their own. Whilst there was undoubtedly witness intimidation and evidence tampering, a lot of the evidence was fairly thin. There were almost no pentiti at the time and few non-Mafiosi willing to risk death by testifying for the prosecution. The trial against the Corleonesi did however have one pentito, Luciano Raia, a former associate of Leggio and Riina. He later withdrew his confessions and was sent to a psychiatric hospital in Turin.

Cesare Terranova was gunned down in 1979. Leggio was accused of ordering the killing from his prison cell, but acquitted due to insufficient evidence.

On 10 December 1969, once all the trials were over, Michele Cavataio and three of his men were shot to death in a gun battle that left one of the attackers dead as well. Having drastically reduced its activities during the crackdown following the Ciaculli Massacre, the Mafia was back in business and its first job was to dispose of Cavataio, who they had finally realised had triggered the First Mafia War.

Many of those in the above trials were convicted at a later date. For example, Gaetano Badalamenti would end his days in a US prison after being convicted of doing in the 1970s and 1980s exactly what he had been accused of planning in the 1960s, namely trafficking heroin into America. Tommaso Buscetta would eventually become one of the first Mafia pentiti and revealed a great deal about the Mafia, although he was a little reluctant to implicate himself or his friends too much, his revelations concentrating on his enemies such as Leggio, Riina and Giuseppe Calo.

== See also ==
- Maxi Trial, which ended in over 300 convictions, took place in 1986/87 in the aftermath of the Second Mafia War. Several defendants in the 1960s trial were present, including Luciano Leggio, Giuseppe Calo and (in absentia) Bernardo Provenzano and Salvatore Riina. Tommaso Buscetta was also present, both as a defendant and also a prosecution witness.
