= Giuseppe Genco Russo =

Italian mafioso and politician (1893–1976)

- Genco Russo in his later years
- Born: 26 January 1893; Mussomeli, Italy
- Died: 18 March 1976 (aged 83); Mussomeli, Italy
- Other name: Zi Peppi Jencu
- Allegiance: Cosa Nostra

Giuseppe Genco Russo (26 January 1893 – 18 March 1976) was a Sicilian Mafia boss from Mussomeli in the province of Caltanissetta, Sicily. Genco Russo, also known as "Zi Peppi Jencu", was an uncouth, sly, semi-literate thug with excellent political connections. A vulgar man, as he used to spit on the floor no matter who was present, he was often photographed with bishops, bankers, civil servants and politicians. He was considered to be the arbiter of Mafia politics, and was regarded as the successor of Calogero Vizzini, who had died in 1954. Although by then a wealthy landowner and politician as a member of Christian Democracy (DC), Genco Russo still kept his mule in the house and the toilet outside, which was little more than a hole in the ground with a stone for a seat and no walls or door, according to Mafia turncoat Tommaso Buscetta.

Traditional mafiosi like Genco Russo and Calogero Vizzini, the Sicilian Mafia bosses in the years between the two world wars until the 1950s and 1960s, were the archetypes of the "man of honour" of a bygone age, as a social intermediary and a man standing for order and peace. Although they used violence to establish their position in the first phase of their careers, in the second stage they limited recourse to violence, turned to primarily legal sources of gain, and exercised their power in an open and legitimate fashion and became "[men] of order".

== Early years ==
Genco Russo at the funeral of Calogero Vizzini on 10 July 1954

Genco Russo was born on 26 January 1893, in Mussomeli, Sicily, into a life of deep poverty. His father was a peasant, and, according to one local, Russo himself had once been little more than a beggar. As a young boy, he had to work as a goatherd on the vast Polizzello estate, which belonged to the aristocratic Lanza Branciforti family. He began his criminal life early, engaging in juvenile highway robbery and livestock theft, rustling cattle and sheep. From the 1920s through the 1940s, he embarked on a "career of violence" to climb the ranks, eventually securing his status as a mafioso — or a "man of honour," as the Mafia calls it.

From 1918 to 1922, Genco Russo served in the military, leaving a record of "rebellious behaviour and impatience to discipline". In a 1927 report by the police chief of Caltanissetta, he was described as "a mafioso that acquired a respectable financial position out of nothing" and on the countryside people feared him. In 1929, he married a local girl; four years later, his first son Vincenzo was born. Best man at the baptism was fellow mafioso Calogero Vizzini, who would also be the witness at the marriage of Vincenzo in 1950 together with Rosario Lanza, the president of the Sicilian Regional Assembly.

Until 1934, Genco Russo officially held no significant land holdings. As caretaker and leaseholder (gabelotto or bailiff), he controlled part of an estate and was an associate in a cooperative that controlled another. As an associate of a cooperative of ex-combatants, he also had a share in the Polizzello estate. He ruled the cooperative through intimidation and threats, while at the same time, he kept working as a labourer in the fields.

== Arrests and acquittals ==
Under Fascist rule in Italy, when the regime launched a crackdown on the Mafia, Genco Russo was repeatedly arrested on a range of charges, including theft, extortion, involvement in a criminal organization, and responsibility for 11 murders and several attempted murders. Yet, with only one exception, he was consistently acquitted due to "insufficient evidence", which was the mark of a successful mafioso showing his power to intimidate potential witnesses and enforce the law of silence (omertà).

In 1929, the National Fascist Party prefect Cesare Mori arrested him with 331 other mafiosi during a massive raid. In 1928, he was acquitted for lack of evidence by the prosecution of four murders, robberies and extortion and a year before, in 1927, he was acquitted of criminal conspiracy. He was sentenced to seven years in prison for criminal association, later reduced to three years, and submitted to special surveillance between 1934 and 1938. In 1944, Genco Russo was officially granted a decree of rehabilitation by the court for his sole conviction, thereby allowing him "to recreate a moral and social virginity, acquiring a respectability which will permit him to undertake even political activity."

== From man of honour to man of order ==
From 1944, Genco Russo was to face no more criminal charges. Police files described him as a "man of order". Once established, the mafioso Genco Russo changed his original behaviour as a "man of honour" to become a "man of order", inserting himself in public life and looking for a political position. His integration into the official power elite proceeded rapidly. After World War II, Genco Russo managed to control two large estates, one being the Polizzello estate where he once herded the goats. The princes of Lanza Branciforti di Trabia made him gabelotto (bailiff) of the domain that measured 2,000 hectares or 20 km^{2}.

Both Genco Russo and Calogero Vizzini established peasant cooperatives in the aftermath of both world wars. These cooperatives served to undermine the influence of left-wing political movements, reinforce their control over the rural population, and secure continued access to land. When land reform was finally introduced in 1950 with the "Gullo law" – named after the former Minister of Agriculture Fausto Gullo – the mafiosi benefitted since they were well positioned to assume their traditional role as intermediaries between peasants, landlords, and the state. They took advantage of the peasants' desperation for land, brokered deals that secured concessions from landlords by softening the reform's effects, and profited significantly from mediating land transactions. In the 1940s, Genco Russo and his followers controlled the rural savings bank, Cassa Rurale in Mussomeli, leaving access to the money market partly in the hands of the Mafia.

A local peasant described to the social activist Danilo Dolci how Genco Russo's reputation changed. He said: "He is constantly in contact with priests, priests go to his place, and he goes to the bank – which is always run by priests – the bank director is a priest, the bank has always been the priests' affair. Spending time with this sort of person has changed him, and now the police treat him with great respect, they greet him when they see him and go out of their way to show their regard for him. He wears better clothes today, and the marshal goes up to him and takes him by the hand, calls him Cavaliere ... during the election campaign, he went and had dinner with Zaccagnini, the Minister, and with Lanza, the Deputy – the three of them together – they had dinner and then they came out arm-in-arm."

== Post-war activities ==
Genco Russo at a Christian Democracy rally

Election poster for Genco Russo on the Christian Democracy list

Persecution by the Italian Fascist authorities proved a blessing in disguise when the regime of Benito Mussolini was toppled, and the Allies of World War II military invaded Sicily in July 1943 (Operation Husky). The Allied Military Government of Occupied Territories (AMGOT), looking for anti-fascist notables to replace Fascist authorities, made Genco Russo mayor of his hometown, Mussomeli. Coordinating the AMGOT effort was the former lieutenant governor of New York, Colonel Charles Poletti, whom Lucky Luciano once described as "one of our good friends".

Initially, Genco Russo's political activity was in support of the separatist and monarchist causes (he was awarded the honorific title of Cavaliere della Corona d'Italia in 1946), and ultimately for the DC party. During the crucial 1948 Italian general election that would decide on Italy's post-war future, Genco Russo and Calogero Vizzini sat at the same table with leading DC politicians, attending an electoral lunch. In 1950, when Genco Russo's oldest son married, Don Calò Vizzini was a witness at the ceremony, just as the DC member Rosario Lanza, the president of the Sicilian Regional Assembly. He became a local DC leader and town councillor in the 1960s, but in 1962 he was forced to step down after he was denounced in the press.

Genco Russo once explained his role in the community to social activist Danilo Dolci, offering a glimpse into how he saw himself during the later phase of his career – not as a dangerous criminal, but as a public benefactor. This reflects the evolving self-image of the mafioso, portraying himself as a protector and community leader rather than an outlaw.

"It's in my nature. I have no ulterior motives. If I can do a man a favour, no matter who he is, I will; because that's how I'm made... I can't say 'no' to anyone. The trouble I'm put to is not so great that I have to refuse people in need... Very often warm-heartedness will win a man gratitude and friendship, and then the time comes to ask for one thing or another in... Folks come and ask how they should vote because they feel the need for advice. They want to show that they are grateful to those who have worked for their good; they want to thank them for what they've done by voting for them; but they are ignorant, and want to be told how to do it."

== Heir of Vizzini ==
Genco Russo apparently irritated other Mafia bosses because he was too much in the media spotlight. A mafioso once said, "Did you see him in the newspaper today, that Gina Lollobrigida?", referring to the notoriously ugly appearance of Genco Russo.

Genco Russo was considered to be the heir of Calogero Vizzini when Don Calò died in 1954. Genco Russo had been at the right-hand side of Don Calò's bier, the ancient sign that the heir-apparent was taking the place of the deceased. In the media, both mafiosi were often depicted as the "boss of bosses" (capo di tutti i capi), although such a position does not exist in the loose structure of the Mafia. According to Antonino Calderone, a Mafia turncoat (pentito), Genco Russo had never been the boss of Cosa Nostra, the real name of the Mafia. The notoriety of Genco Russo was not looked upon well by other mafiosi. Like Vizzini, he exposed himself too much, giving interviews and getting photographed.

Genco Russo was present at the Grand Hotel et des Palmes Mafia meeting, which was a series of meetings between top American and Sicilian mafiosi that took place in Palermo between 12 and 16 October 1957. Joseph Bonanno, Carmine Galante, and Lucky Luciano were among the American mafiosi present, while among the Sicilian side there were, apart from Genco Russo, Salvatore "Ciaschiteddu" Greco, his cousin Salvatore "The Engineer" Greco, Angelo La Barbera, Gaetano Badalamenti, Totò Minore, and Tommaso Buscetta. One of the outcomes of this meeting was that the Mafia composed its first Sicilian Mafia Commission and appointed "Ciaschiteddu" Greco as its "primus interpares".

In the aftermath of the First Mafia War in 1962–1963 and the Ciaculli massacre that prompted the first concerted anti-Mafia efforts by the state in post-war Italy through the Antimafia Commission, Genco Russo was among the many mafiosi arrested on 6 February 1964, when he turned himself in. He was often seen with Sicily's DC deputy Calogero Volpe, and Antonino Pietro Gullotti, the future Minister of Public Works, was photographed hand in hand with Genco Russo at the time when he was secretary for the DC in Sicily. All of this was duly recorded by the Antimafia Commission.

His appearance at the 1960s Sicilian Mafia trials made many of the island's establishment very nervous. When showing up in court, Genco Russo presented petitions from prominent politicians, priests, bankers, doctors, lawyers, and businessmen who declared to testify on his behalf. His lawyer threatened to publish telegrams from 37 DC deputies, including one cabinet minister, thanking Genco Russo for helping them to get elected. Minister and prominent DC politician Bernardo Mattarella denied that he had been sent one. Genco Russo was sentenced to five years' confinement by the Court of Caltanissetta and sent to Lovere, near Bergamo.

== Decline and death ==
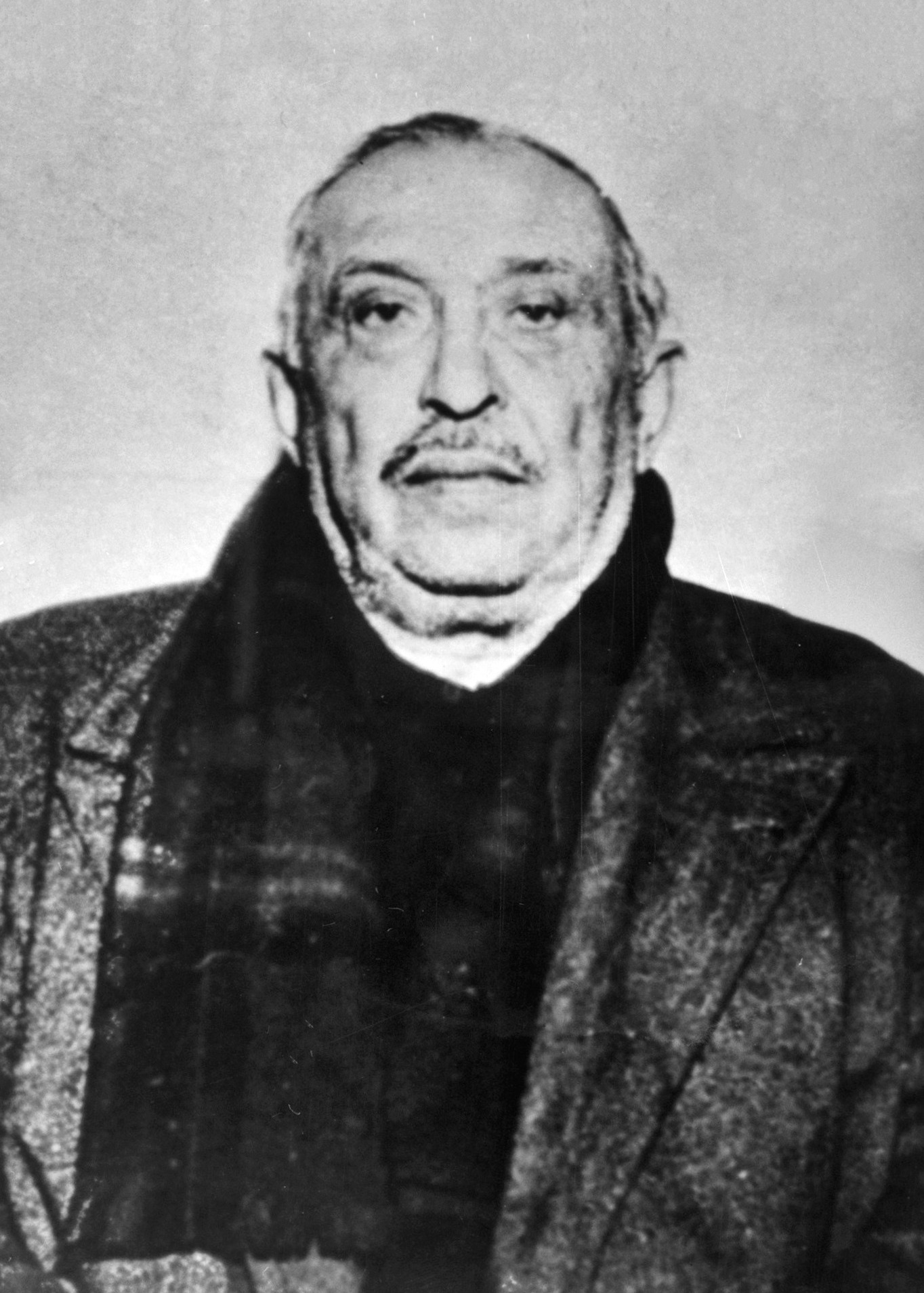
Genco Russo in 1964

His forced retirement as town councillor of Mussomeli, his arrest and years of confinement initiated the decline of Genco Russo's power. Within the Mafia, a new generation of mafiosi was coming to the forefront. Genco Russo represented the old rural and semi-feudal Mafia that based their power on access to land and openly acknowledged community power. The new generation was more entrepreneurial and made their money with cigarette smuggling, drug trafficking, skimming off public contracts, and speculating in real estate.

Genco Russo was never the "boss of all bosses" as the media depicted him. He certainly had leverage providing voters for the DC at a local level, but it is hardly imaginable that the Mafia was ruled from a small and isolated town in the interior of Sicily, and not by the powerful Mafia families in Palermo. The fact that Salvatore "Ciaschiteddu" Greco, a representative of the Palermo-based Mafia, was made secretary of the first Sicilian Mafia Commission and not Genco Russo was a clear sign that his influence was limited. Genco Russo was probably only present at the Grand Hotel et des Palmes Mafia meeting in 1957 because Santo Sorge, one of his relatives from the United States, was there as well. Genco Russo apparently irritated other Mafia bosses because he was too much in the media spotlight. A mafioso once said, "Did you see him in the newspaper today, that Gina Lollobrigida?", referring to the notoriously ugly appearance of Genco Russo.

The new generation of mafiosi did not share the style of openly exercised power. Instead, they preferred to operate clandestinely and detested publicity. In 1972, Genco Russo returned to Mussomeli from his banishment. The journalist Giampaolo Pansa visited the old boss that year and described the decline in an article entitled "The Sunset of the Mafia" (Il tramonto del mafioso) in which he depicted the old boss in rather squalid and degenerating circumstances after the death of his wife Rosalia. He did not answer the many questions and denied the existence of the Mafia. He said: "Mafia? Mafia in Sicily? Out of the question! I have no knowledge, I do not know what to tell you."

Genco Russo died peacefully at the age of 83 in March 1976 from pulmonary emphysema. Half blind from cataracts and broken in health, he had spent the last four years living quietly in his son's home. At the time of his death, he possessed 147,000 hectares of land in several holdings around Caltanissetta, Canicattì, and Casteltermini through front men and family members. The final testament of Genco Russo was written by the Antimafia Commission in its final report. It read: "Genco Russo was really a typical example of a Sicilian mafia boss ... a typical example of someone who particularly is able to assume and exercise to the community the function of commander, protector, mediator and adviser."

== Bibliography ==
- Arlacchi, Pino (1988). Mafia Business. The Mafia ethic and the spirit of capitalism, Oxford: Oxford University Press ISBN 0-19-285197-7
- Arlacchi, Pino (1993). Men of Dishonor: Inside the Sicilian Mafia, New York: Morrow ISBN 0-688-04574-X
- Chubb, Judith (1989). The Mafia and Politics, Cornell Studies in International Affairs, Occasional Papers No. 23.
- Dolci, Danilo (1981). Sicilian lives, New York: Pantheon Books ISBN 0-394-51536-6
- Dickie, John (2004). Cosa Nostra. A history of the Sicilian Mafia, London: Coronet ISBN 0-340-82435-2.
- Gambetta, Diego (1993).The Sicilian Mafia: The Business of Private Protection, London: Harvard University Press, ISBN 0-674-80742-1.
- Hess, Henner (1998). Mafia & Mafiosi: Origin, Power, and Myth, London: Hurst & Co Publishers, ISBN 1-85065-500-6 (Review).
- (in Italian) Mangano, Antonello (2000). Mafia come sistema, Terrelibre.it
- Paoli, Letizia (2003). Mafia Brotherhoods: Organized Crime, Italian Style, New York: Oxford University Press ISBN 0-19-515724-9.
- Servadio, Gaia (1976), Mafioso. A history of the Mafia from its origins to the present day, London: Secker & Warburg ISBN 0-436-44700-2
- Sterling, Claire (1990). Octopus. How the long reach of the Sicilian Mafia controls the global narcotics trade, New York: Simon & Schuster, ISBN 0-671-73402-4.
