= Giudici (surname) =

Giudici is an Italian surname, meaning "judges". Notable people with the surname include:

- Battista dei Giudici (1428–1484), Italian bishop
- Carlo Maria Giudici (1723–1804), Italian painter
- Catherine Giudici (born 1986), American graphic designer and reality television star
- Enzo Giudici (1920–1985), Italian academic, specialising in French Renaissance literature
- Gianni Giudici (born 1946), Italian racing driver
- Giorgio Giudici (born 1945), Swiss architect and politician
- Giovanni Giudici (1924–2011), Italian poet and journalist
- Lena Giudici (1898–1995), American lawyer and clubwoman
- Luca Giudici (born 1992), Italian football player
- Luigi De Giudici (1887–1955), Italian painter
- Paolo Giudici, Italian professor of Statistics
- Paolo Emiliani Giudici (1812–1872), Italian writer
- Pietro Giudici (1921–2002), Italian racing cyclist
- Reinaldo Giudici (1853–1921), Italian-born Argentine painter

== See also ==
- Giudice
