= Ralph Salerno =

Police officer and expert on the American mafia

Ralph Salerno (1925–2003) was a New York police officer, author and recognized expert on the American Mafia. Upon his retirement The New York Times described him as a man "who has gained the reputation of knowing more about the Mafia than any other non-member".

== Biography ==
Salerno was the youngest of 11 children born to Italian immigrants from Avellino, Italy. He was the only child born in The Bronx when his family moved there from East Harlem. They had fled an Italian ghetto there filled with organized crime. When he graduated high school he joined the US Navy in 1943, fighting in the Pacific Theater before being discharged in December 1945.

Salerno joined the police in 1946. He was made a detective in 1950 and promoted to sergeant in 1960. He joined Criminal Intelligence Bureau of the force. Salerno frequently provided testimony to the US Congress and both federal and state courts on the issue of organized crime. He provided testimony to the McClellan Committee (1957–1960) and worked as a consultant to it. Later he worked as a consultant for the House Select Committee on Assassinations (1977–1979), in this capacity he produced a report for the committee.

In 1967, Santo Sorge sued the city of New York alongside Salerno and John F. Shaney of the NYPD, in a defamation and libel case asking for US$418,000 in damages. Salerno had testified in 1965 before Judge Vigneri of the Palermo Criminal Court that Sorge had close relationships with Lucky Luciano, Vito Genovese, Carmine Galante and Joe Bonanno. According to Sorge the retired officers provided false information and admitted that they could not prove their allegations with certainty. According to Salerno, Sorge "was interested in Cosa Nostra in general for which he maintained public relations." The libel suit was dismissed in March 1968.

He retired from the NYPD in 1967. Afterwards he became a consultant to the US Department of Justice and to the non-profit National Council on Crime and Delinquency. In 1967 he travelled to Canada to speak before the Quebec Royal Commission. In 1970 Mayor John V. Lindsay appointed him as special advisor to the Off-Track Betting Corporation amid concerns that organized crime was attempting to infiltrate or sabotage the corporation. In 1973 he joined the Rackets Bureau in the Queens County District Attorney's office following the election of Nicholas Ferraro.

Salerno spoke at public forums and gave lectures at universities across North America. In 1969 his book The Crime Confederation was published by Doubleday. He retired from public service in 1975, going on to become a consultant in the private sector. In March 1981, he was interviewed on the talk show Tomorrow Coast to Coast.

He died from congestive heart failure in October 2003, aged 78. He had lived at Lake Ariel in Pennsylvania since 1988.

== Works ==
- (with John S. Tompkins) The Crime Confederation: Cosa Nostra and Allied Operations in Organized Crime. Doubleday. 1969.
