= Salvatore La Barbera =

Member of the Sicilian Mafia

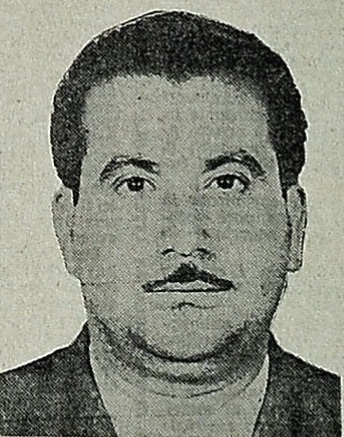
- Born: 20 April 1922; Palermo, Sicily, Kingdom of Italy
- Died: 17 January 1963 (aged 40); Sicily, Italy
- Occupation: Mafioso

Salvatore La Barbera (Italian: [salvaˈtoːre la barˈbɛːra]; 20 April 1922 – 17 January 1963) was a Sicilian mafioso. Together with his brother Angelo La Barbera he ruled the Mafia family of Palermo Centro. Salvatore La Barbera sat on the first Sicilian Mafia Commission that was set up in 1958 as the capo mandamento for Mafia families of Borgo Vecchio, Porta Nuova and Palermo Centro. La Barbera disappeared during the First Mafia War, a victim of the lupara bianca, never to be seen again.

The Palermo police suspected that Salvatore Greco "Ciaschiteddu" and his cousin Salvatore Greco "The Engineer" had arranged a deal whereby Tommaso Buscetta betrayed his former friend, killed him and disposed of his body in the furnaces of his glass factory. Buscetta claimed to know nothing about the disappearance. Later on, pentito Antonino Calderone revealed that La Barbera was killed by Cicchiteddu and the body was made to disappear with the help of Cicchiteddu's ally Gigino Pizzuto, capomandamento of Castronovo di Sicilia.

== See also ==
- Angelo La Barbera
- Il Capo dei Capi
