= Angelo La Barbera =

Member of the Sicilian Mafia

- Angelo La Barbera
- Born: 3 July 1924; Palermo, Sicily, Kingdom of Italy
- Died: 28 October 1975 (aged 51); Perugia, Umbria, Italy
- Cause of death: Stabbed to death in prison
- Known for: Protagonist in the First Mafia War
- Status: Deceased (imprisoned from 1968)
- Allegiance: Palermo Centro Mafia family / Sicilian Mafia
- Conviction: Murder
- Penalty: 22 years (later reduced to 10 years and 6 months)

Angelo La Barbera (Italian: [ˈandʒelo la barˈbɛːra]; 3 July 1924 – 28 October 1975) was a powerful member of the Sicilian Mafia. Together with his brother Salvatore La Barbera he ruled the Mafia family of Palermo Centro. Salvatore La Barbera sat on the first Sicilian Mafia Commission that was set up in 1958 as the capo mandamento, or district head, for Mafia families of Borgo Vecchio, Porta Nuova and Palermo Centro.

Gaia Servadio, an English/Italian journalist who wrote a biography on Angelo La Barbera, described him as the symbol of the quick, clever gangster – the new post-war mafioso who in the end became the victim of the many politicians he himself had built. He represented the proletariat who tried to become mafioso, middle class, and ultimately did not succeed.

== Mafia career ==
Angelo and Salvatore La Barbera were born in the slums of the neighbourhood of Partanna-Mondello in Palermo. Their father was an itinerant charcoal burner and vendor. They started with petty larceny and murder and raised themselves to become prominent leaders of a new generation of mafiosi in the 1950s and 1960s who made their fortune in real estate transactions, cigarette smuggling and heroin trafficking. The brothers were bent on transcending the indignities of their poverty. Angelo la Barbera became the protégé of a local Mafia boss, and by 1952 they had organized a building supply company. They then murdered the right-hand man to the contractor Salvatore Moncada, so that they could become the construction entrepreneur’s lieutenants.

By 1955 Angelo La Barbera had become the vice-boss and de facto head of the Palermo Centro cosca. One of La Barbera’s hitmen was Tommaso Buscetta, who subsequently became a pentito (collaborating witness) in 1984. Still in his thirties, Angelo la Barbera began acting like a man of affairs, acquiring bulldozers, trucks and other construction equipment as well as apartment buildings. Generous and charming, he embraced a flamboyant lifestyle marked by new cars, luxurious clothes and frequent visits to Milan and Rome, where he stayed in the best hotels, surrounded by beautiful women. Buscetta remembers Angelo La Barbera as "arrogant and haughty".

The La Barbera brothers together with other upstart Mafia bosses like Pietro Torretta and their henchmen formed the so-called ‘New Mafia’ which adopted new gangster techniques. Other smaller cosche came to recognize the supremacy of these bosses – a supremacy achieved by sheer violence. Men who were starting their ‘careers’ in their shadow were forming into new generation of mafiosi; they had initiative, and the road to the leadership of a cosca had suddenly become quicker and available to those who were fast with their tommy-guns. One of these upstarts was Tommaso Buscetta, another was Gerlando Alberti.

== Ties with politics ==
The new generation of mafiosi like La Barbera needed to create a new political base of their own, pushing forward new politicians through which they could influence control over regional corporations, and credit banks and circumvent building regulations. Angelo La Barbera had connections with local politicians of the Christian Democrat party (DC - Democrazia Cristiana) – in particular with Salvo Lima, the mayor of Palermo from 1958-1963. In 1964, during an investigation, Lima had to admit that he knew Angelo La Barbera. According to Buscetta, Lima’s father, Vincenzo Lima, was a "man of honour" of the Palermo Centro Mafia family that was led by the La Barbera brothers. Lima's election was supported by the La Barbera clan. Their candidate in the national parliament was Giovanni Gioia.

Lima’s period as mayor of Palermo was later referred to as the "Sack of Palermo" because the construction boom led to the destruction of the city's green belt and villas that gave it architectural grace, to make way for characterless and shoddily constructed apartment blocks. In the meantime, Palermo’s historical centre was allowed to crumble. The La Barbera's were connected to the leading construction entrepreneur Francesco Vassallo. In five years, 4,000 building licences were signed, more than half of them in the names of three pensioners who acted as frontmen and had no connection with construction at all.

== Heroin trafficking ==
The La Barbera brothers were present at a series of meetings between top American and Sicilian mafiosi that took place in Palermo between 12-16 October 1957, in hotel Delle Palme in Palermo. Joseph Bonanno, Lucky Luciano, John Bonventre, Frank Garofalo, Santo Sorge and Carmine Galante were among the American mafiosi present, while among the Sicilian side there were Salvatore "Ciaschiteddu" Greco and his cousin Salvatore Greco "The Engineer", Giuseppe Genco Russo, Gaetano Badalamenti, Calcedonio Di Pisa and Tommaso Buscetta. One of the issues at the meetings was the organisation of heroin trafficking to the United States.

In 1960 Angelo La Barbera was spotted in Mexico City and subsequently expelled from the United States and Canada for allegedly organising trafficking in heroin. According to Buscetta, La Barbera tried to smuggle heroin from Mexico into the US, but was stopped by Carlo Gambino, the boss of the powerful Gambino crime family in New York City, who threatened to kill him if he would proceed.

== On the Commission ==
Salvatore La Barbera became a member of the first Sicilian Mafia Commission when it was set up somewhere in 1958. However, the La Barberas soon ran into trouble with the Commission, when the contractor Moncada (formerly La Barbera’s patron) complained before the Commission that the La Barberas overcharged him on building supplies. The Commission decided in Moncada’s favour and ordered Angelo La Barbera to give up the leadership of the Palermo Centro family—which he refused to do. Angelo La Barbera refused to recognize the authority of the Commission over his family altogether.

== First Mafia War ==
The La Barbera brothers were the protagonists in a bloody conflict between rival clans in Palermo in the early 1960s. Known as the First Mafia War—a second started in the early 1980s—the struggle was about wresting control of Palermo’s rackets in the markets, sale of building sites, construction and heroin trade to North America from the older Mafia.

The conflict erupted over an underweight shipment of heroin. Cesare Manzella, the Greco cousins from Ciaculli and the La Barbera brothers had financed the shipment. Suspicion fell on Calcedonio Di Pisa, who had collected the heroin for Manzella from the Corsican supplier, Pascal Molinelli, and had organised the transport to Manzella’s partners in New York.

The case was brought before the Mafia Commission, but disagreement on how to handle it, and old hostility towards the La Barberas, led to a bloody conflict, between clans allied with the Grecos, headed by Salvatore Greco "Ciaschiteddu", and clans allied with the La Barberas. What sparked a series of attacks and counter-attacks was the killing of Di Pisa on 26 December 1962. The Grecos suspected Salvatore and Angelo La Barbera of the attack, although the one behind it was in fact another mafioso, Michele Cavataio, as he tried to pit the Grecos and La Barberas against one another for his own goals.

On 17 January 1963, Salvatore La Barbera disappeared and was never heard of again. Angelo La Barbera also disappeared, but two weeks later he reappeared in Milan, in the north of Italy, giving a press conference. The involvement of the media in Mafia affairs was unheard of at the time. Meanwhile, La Barbera tried to retaliate, but the rival clans were closing in. On 25 May 1963, he was shot in Milan and severely wounded. He was arrested in the hospital. Buscetta admits to having accepted a contract to kill Angelo La Barbera but claims that someone else carried out the shooting in Milan before he could.

On 30 June 1963, a car bomb in Ciaculli killed seven police and military officers sent to defuse it after an anonymous phone call. The outrage over the Ciaculli massacre changed the Mafia war into a war against the Mafia. It prompted the first concerted anti-Mafia efforts by the state in post-war Italy. The Sicilian Mafia Commission was dissolved and of those mafiosi who had escaped arrest, many went abroad.

== Trial and death ==
Angelo La Barbera was charged with seven murders. He was one of the few mafiosi who received a heavy sentence at the Trial of the 114 against the Mafia in Catanzaro in December 1968. He was sentenced to 22 years but appealed. In May 1970, a government decree established that defendants whose sentences had not yet become final after they had been held without bail for four to six years had to be released provisionally pending their appeals. La Barbera was one of the benefactors and had to post USD 1,400 bail.

Pending the appeal, he was sent into banishment in the North of Italy and later to Linosa, a remote island off the coast of Sicily. At the end of 1973, his sentence was reduced to ten years and six months. When he was finally locked up in a prison in Perugia in 1975, three mafiosi stabbed him to death on 28 October 1975. By then his power and influence had declined sharply. The Mafia family he had led was dissolved. According to newspaper reports, the murder was probably ordered by the Greco cousins. Mafia expert and journalist Michele Pantaleone claimed that La Barbera was eliminated because he might have threatened to reveal the involvement of politicians with the Mafia.

== Biography ==
- Servadio, Gaia (1974). Angelo La Barbera: the profile of a Mafia boss, London: Quartet Books, 1974.
