= Lo Giudice =

Lo Giudice or LoGiudice is a surname of Italian origin. Notable people with this surname include:

- Franco Lo Giudice (1893–1990), Italian operatic tenor
- Jack LoGiudice, American television writer and producer
- Lauren LoGiudice (born 1983), American artist, writer and creator of sketch comedy characters

== See also ==
- Giudice (disambiguation)
