= Giudice =

Giudice is Italian for the profession "judge". It is also a surname, and may refer to:

== People ==
- Dominick Giudice (born 2002), American football player
- Geoffrey Giudice (1947–2021), judge of the Federal Court of Australia
- Gia Giudice (born 2001), American television personality and podcaster, daughter of Teresa
- Gian Francesco Giudice (born 1961), Italian theoretical physicist
- Linda Giudice, American gynaecologist and obstetrician
- Teresa Giudice (born 1972), American reality television cast-member, author, and entrepreneur

== Role ==
- Giudice, the monarch of a giudicato, an autonomous state entity in medieval Sardinia

== See also ==
- Giudici (surname)
- Lo Giudice (surname)
- Giudici (rulers of Sardinian Judicates, historical Sardinian kingdoms)
