= Salvatore "Ciaschiteddu" Greco =

20th-century Sicilian mafioso

Salvatore "Ciaschiteddu" Greco (Italian: [salvaˈtoːre ˈɡrɛːko], Sicilian: [tʃascɪˈtɛɖɖʊ]; 13 January 1923 – 7 March 1978) was a powerful mafioso and boss of the Sicilian Mafia in Ciaculli, an outlying suburb of Palermo famous for its citrus fruit groves, where he was born. His nickname, "Ciaschiteddu" or "Cicchiteddu", translates from the Sicilian alternatively as "little bird" or as "little wine jug".

"Ciaschiteddu" Greco was the first "secretary" of the first Sicilian Mafia Commission that was formed somewhere in 1958. That position came to him almost naturally because he headed one of the most influential Mafia clans at the time, which went back to the late 19th century.

== Early life ==
He was the son of Giuseppe Greco who was killed during a bloody internal feud between the factions of the Greco Mafia clan in Ciaculli and Croceverde Giardini in 1946–47. The peace between the two rival factions of the Greco clan was settled by giving the rights of the Giardini estate to Salvatore "Ciaschiteddu" Greco and his cousin Salvatore Greco, also known as "l'ingegnere" or "Totò il lungo". Although descendants of the old, established rural Mafia, the Greco cousins quickly learned to profit from the post-war economic boom and became involved in cigarette smuggling and heroin trafficking.

== Head of the Mafia Commission ==
"Ciaschiteddu" Greco was present at a series of meetings between top American and Sicilian mafiosi that took place in Palermo between 12–16 October 1957, in hotel Delle Palme in Palermo. Joseph Bonanno, Lucky Luciano, John Bonventre, Frank Garofalo, Santo Sorge and Carmine Galante were among the American mafiosi present, while among the Sicilian side, there were – apart from the Greco cousins – Giuseppe Genco Russo, Angelo La Barbera, Gaetano Badalamenti, Calcedonio Di Pisa and Tommaso Buscetta.

One of the outcomes of this meeting was that the Sicilian Mafia composed its first Sicilian Mafia Commission and appointed "Ciaschiteddu" Greco as its "primus inter pares".

== The Mattei affair ==
According to Buscetta, who became a repentant in 1984, "Ciaschiteddu" Greco was involved in the killing of Enrico Mattei, the controversial president of the state oil company Ente Nazionale Idrocarburi, who died in a mysterious plane crash on October 27, 1962. Mattei allegedly was killed at the request of the American Mafia because his oil policies had damaged important American interests in the Middle East. The American Mafia in turn was possibly doing a favour to the large oil companies.

Buscetta claimed that Mattei's death was organized by Mafia bosses "Ciaschiteddu" Greco, Stefano Bontade and Giuseppe Di Cristina on the request of Angelo Bruno, a Sicilian born Mafia boss from Philadelphia. Gaetano Iannì, another pentito, declared that a special agreement had been achieved between Cosa Nostra and "some foreigners" for the elimination of Mattei which was organized by Giuseppe Di Cristina. These statements triggered new inquiries, including the exhumation of Mattei's corpse.

The Commission was probably also involved in the decision to kill the journalist Mauro De Mauro, who disappeared on 16 September 1970, while investigating the Mattei case on the request of film director Francesco Rosi, for the film The Mattei Affair (Italian: Il Caso Mattei) released in 1972.

== First Mafia War ==
"Ciaschiteddu" Greco was one of the protagonists in a bloody Mafia war between rival clans in Palermo in the early 1960s – known as the First Mafia War and followed by a second in the 1980s – for the control of the profitable opportunities brought about by rapid urban growth and the illicit heroin trade to North America. The conflict was sparked by a quarrel over an underweight shipment of heroin and the murder of Calcedonio Di Pisa – an ally of the Grecos – in December 1962.

The Grecos suspected the brothers Salvatore and Angelo La Barbera of the attack. Salvatore La Barbera disappeared on 17 January, and the police suspected Greco of ordering the murder. Many mafiosi from both the Greco and La Barbera sides were killed in the conflict, but it was later discovered that the war was in fact started by Michele Cavataio, who was hostile to both Grecos and La Barbera and successfully pitted them against one another for his own goals.

On 30 June 1963, a car bomb exploded near Greco's house in Ciaculli, killing seven police and military officers sent to defuse it after an anonymous phone call. The outrage over the Ciaculli Massacre changed the Mafia war into a war against the Mafia. It prompted the first concerted anti-mafia efforts by the state in post-war Italy. The Sicilian Mafia Commission was dissolved and of those mafiosi who had escaped arrest, many went abroad. "Ciaschiteddu" Greco fled to Caracas in Venezuela.

The repression caused by the Ciaculli Massacre disarranged the Sicilian heroin trade to the United States. Mafiosi were banned, arrested and incarcerated. Control over the trade fell into the hands of a few fugitives: the Greco cousins, Pietro Davì, Tommaso Buscetta and Gaetano Badalamenti.

On 22 December 1968, "Ciaschiteddu" Greco was sentenced in absentia to four years in prison at the trial against "the 114" in Catanzaro that was a consequence of the Ciaculli Massacre. In the appeal, he was acquitted. In 1973 he received the maximum period of five years of internal banishment on the remote island of Asinara, but he was nowhere to be found.

== In Venezuela ==
Meanwhile, in Venezuela Greco formed alliances with the Gambino crime family in New York and the Cuntrera-Caruana Mafia clan from Siculiana (Sicily) to facilitate drug trafficking.

While he resided in Venezuela, "Ciaschiteddu" Greco still remained an important figure in the internal leadership of Cosa Nostra, for which he travelled to Italy regularly. He was involved in the decisions to re-establish the Mafia Commission in 1970, and whether or not to take part in the neo-fascist coup attempt of Junio Valerio Borghese for which Borghese had offered amnesty for Mafia members in prison. Cosa Nostra decided not to take part and the attempt was foiled on 8 December 1970.

In January 1978, an ailing Greco travelled from his home in Venezuela to Italy in an effort to restrain Gaetano Badalamenti, Giuseppe Di Cristina and Salvatore Inzerillo from retaliating against the growing power of the Corleonesi headed by Totò Riina. His efforts were in vain and the struggle was the prelude to the Second Mafia War.

On 7 March 1978, Greco died in Caracas, Venezuela from cirrhosis of the liver.
