= The Terror Network =

Book by Claire Sterling

- Author: Claire Sterling
- Subject: Counter-terrorism
- Publisher: Henry Holt & Company
- Publication date: 1981
- ISBN: 0030506611

The Terror Network: The Secret War of International Terrorism (ISBN 0030506611) is a 1981 book by Claire Sterling, published by Henry Holt & Company, which argued that the USSR was using terrorists as a proxy force.

In part because of the book, CIA director William J. Casey commissioned a Special National Intelligence Estimate on Soviet support for terrorism. After receiving the draft estimate, Casey objected that there was less in the draft on Soviet ties to terrorism than in Sterling's book. Although Casey was advised that the CIA had played a part in supplying Sterling with "concocted misinformation for public propaganda", he requested that the draft be revised. The resulting estimate had this to say about the book:

The publication of The Terror Network by Claire Sterling and the selections in the press have created a great deal of interest inside and outside the Intelligence Community. Although well-written and extensively documented, amassing information in public sources, the book is uneven and the reliability of its sources varies widely. Significant portions are correct; others are incorrect or written without attending to important detail. Sterling's conclusion is that the Soviets are not coordinating worldwide terrorism from some central point, but that they are contributing to it in several ways.

Michael Ledeen promoted the book's claims when it was published. He was quoted in National Review, a conservative magazine, claiming that "Almost everything Claire said was borne out" by Stasi files that emerged after the end of the Cold War.

According to Melvin Goodman, the Head of Office of Soviet Affairs at the CIA from 1976 to 1987, the claims of a terror network were in fact black propaganda created by the CIA.
