= Mussomeli =

- Comune
- Comune di Mussomeli
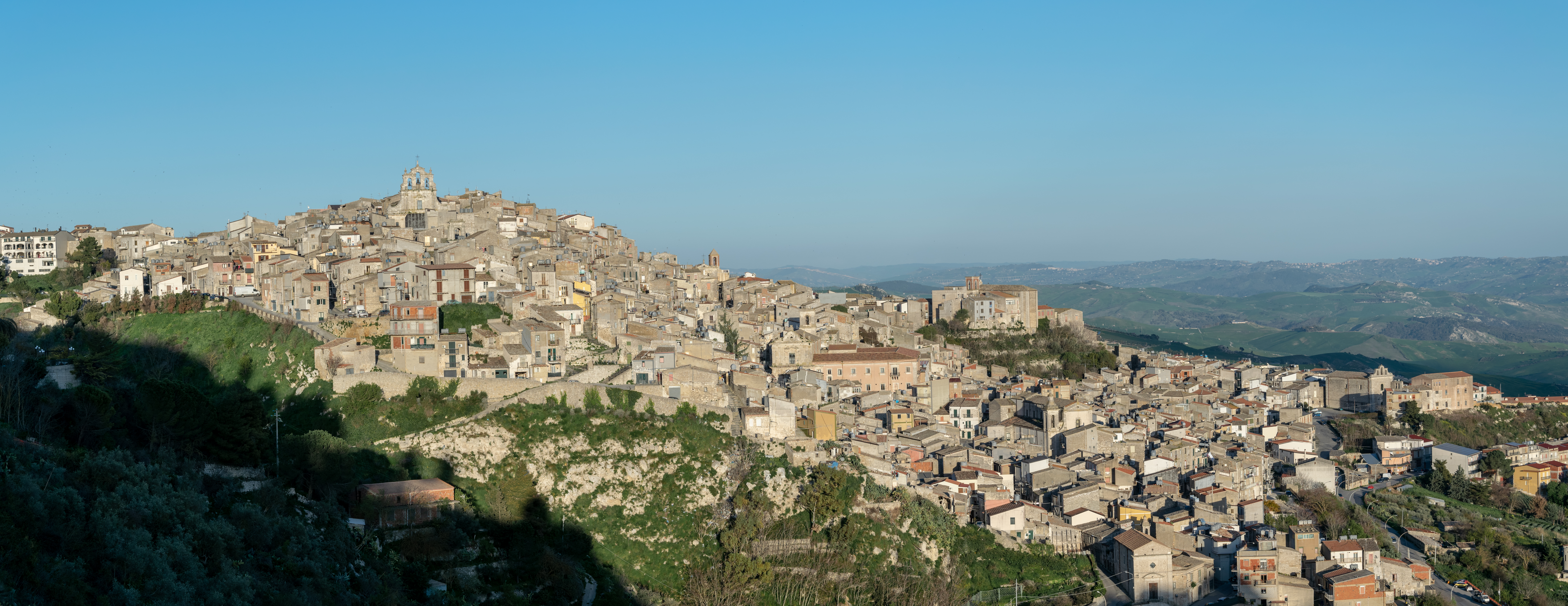

- Coat of arms

- Location within Italy Location within Sicily
- Coordinates: 37°34′46″N 13°45′09″E
- Country: Italy
- Region: Sicily
- Province: Caltanissetta (CL)
- Frazioni: Mappa, Polizzello

Government
  - Mayor: Gianluca Nigrelli

Area
  - Total: 161 km^{2} (62 sq mi)
- Elevation: 650 m (2,130 ft)

Population (January 31, 2004)
  - Total: 11,354
  - Density: 70.5/km^{2} (183/sq mi)
- Demonym: Mussomelesi
- Time zone: UTC+1 (CET)
  - Summer (DST): UTC+2 (CEST)
- Postal code: 93014
- Dialing code: 0934
- Patron saint: Madonna of the Miracles
- Saint day: September 8
- Website: Official website

Mussomeli (Mussumeli in Sicilian) is a town and comune in the province of Caltanissetta, Sicily, Italy.

== History ==
Mussomeli is claimed to have been founded in the 14th century by Manfredo III Chiaramonte with the name Manfredi, but later the current name, of Latin or Arab origin, was imposed. In 1549 it became a county under the Lanza family.

== Culture ==
A feast is held every September for the Madonna of the Miracles. A similar feast is held simultaneously in Buffalo, NY, which has a large number of Mussomeli émigrés and their descendants.

== Diaspora ==
Many townspeople emigrated to the UK, to London and Woking, Surrey where the Madonna dei Miracoli (Madonna of Miracles) is celebrated every July. This created a depopulation problem in the town, and as of 2021 the town is seeking foreign purchasers of the empty houses in central Mussomeli.

== People linked to Mussomeli ==
- Don Francesco Langela (1598-1679)
- Don Giuseppe Langela, mayor in 1625 and in 1648
- Paolo Emiliani Giudici (1812-1872), writer and literary critic
- Salvatore Frangiamore (1853-1915), painter
- Joseph A. Mussomeli (1952), American diplomat
- Giuseppe Sorge (1857-1937), historian, prefect and director of the public security
- Giuseppe Genco Russo (1893-1976), organized crime figure
- Santo Sorge (1908-1972), organized crime figure
- Domenico Canalella (1914-1978), priest and translator
- Salvatore Cardinale (1948), politician
- Roberto Mistretta (1963), journalist and poet

== Main sights ==
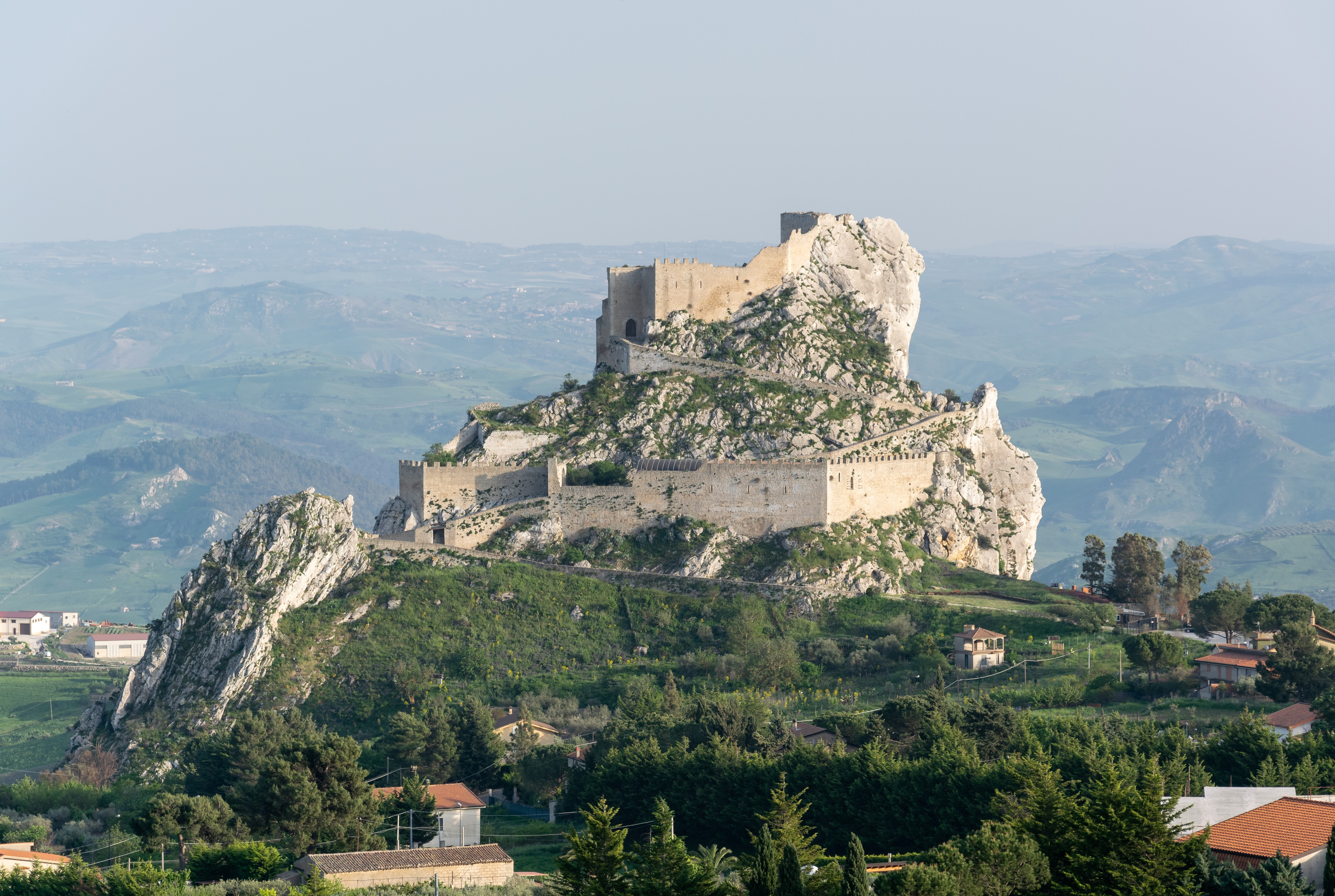
The Castle of Mussomeli.

- The Chiaramonte Castle Castello Manfredonico, built in 1370 in Norman-Gothic style. It stands on a high crag, elevation 778 metres (2,552 ft), 2 kilometres (1.2 mi) outside the town. It has large halls, dungeons and torture cells, and a chapel with a precious alabaster depicting the Madonna dell Catena (1516). Near the castle are the ruins of a Greek-Italic village.
- The Santuario della Madonna dei Miracoli (Church of Our Lady of the Miracles)
- The Chiesa Madre of San Ludovico (14th century). It was restored along Baroque lines in the 17th century.
- The Renaissance church of San Francesco.
- The 17th Palazzo Trabìa, with a noteworthy art gallery.
- The church of St. Anthony (16th century)
