= Paolo Giudici =

Professor of Statistics

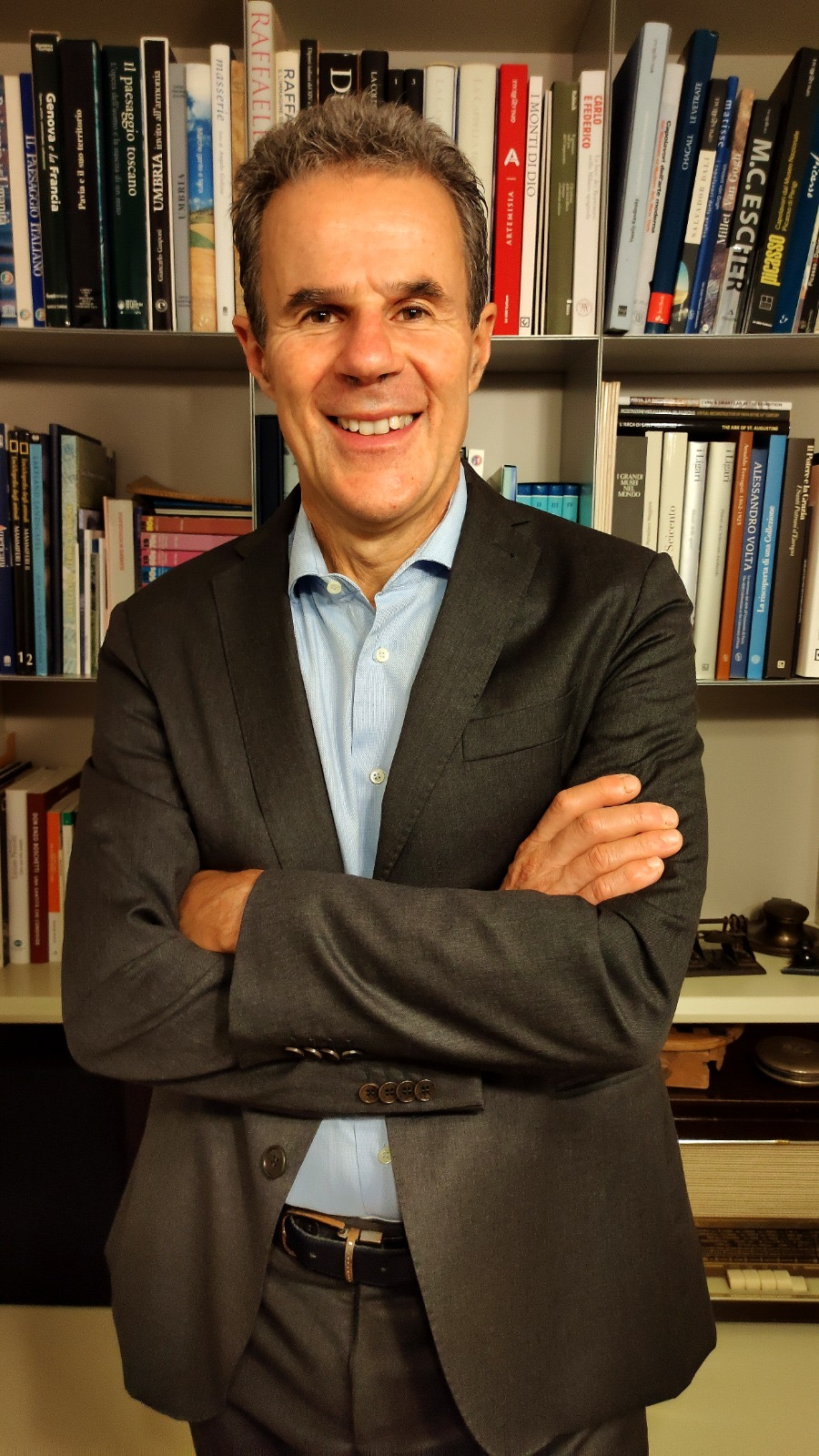
- Occupations: Academic and author

Academic background
- Education: Master of Science in Economics; Master of Science in Statistics; Doctor of Philosophy in Statistics
- Alma mater: Bocconi University; University of Minnesota; University of Trento

Academic work
- Institutions: University of Pavia

Paolo Giudici is an academic and an author. He is a full professor of Statistics at the University of Pavia.

Giudici's research interests include statistical inference and machine learning, with a particular focus on risk analysis, explainable AI, and financial technologies.

== Education ==
Giudici completed his Master of Science in Economics at Bocconi University in 1989 and his Master of Science in Statistics at the University of Minnesota in 1990. Later, he earned his PhD in Statistics from the University of Trento in 1994.

== Career ==
Giudici began his career as an assistant professor of Statistics at the University of Pavia from 1994 to 1999. At the same institution, he also held other appointments, including associate professor of Statistics at the faculty of Economics from 2000 to 2006, full professor of Statistics at the faculty of Political Sciences from 2007 to 2011, and, since 2012, he has been a full professor of Statistics at the Department of Economics and Management.

Giudici has coordinated European-funded research projects, including FIN-TECH and PERISCOPE. He holds the appointment of specialty chief editor at the Artificial Intelligence in Finance (Frontiers).

== Research ==
To characterize the contagion impact between asset prices, Giudici introduced an extended Vector Autoregressive model based on network models, concluding that Bitcoin prices have a low correlation with traditional assets. Together with Bussmann and others, he proposed an explainable AI model to analyze credit management and risk during peer-to-peer lending, assessing Shapley values, and analyzing 15,000 firms to identify non-risky and risky borrowers, as well as underscoring their financial characteristics. He also conducted a study to evaluate two explainable AI models: Local Interpretable Model-agnostic Explanations (LIME) and SHapley Additive Explanations (SHAP), employing XGBoost to predict the default probability for Small and Medium Enterprises. The study highlighted that LIME has less discriminatory power than SHAP.

Giudici authored a book titled Applied Data Mining: Statistical Methods for Business and Industry, in which he described applied data mining techniques (including computational and statistical modelling) within a unified statistical framework and demonstrated their practical applications. Wei Jiang, in his review of the book, stated that "the book provides a detailed presentation of these case studies". However, he described the discussed criterion as "quite brief but transparent" and suggested that "it would be better to provide a clear link between different criteria". Lesley F. Wright from Liverpool John Moores University commented that "the book's strength lies in the number and diversity of these case studies". Richard J. Cleary characterized it as a book with many "nice features". However, he highlighted the presence of "some sections that are perhaps too difficult".

Furthermore, Giudici and Raffinetti expanded the use of Lorenz Zonoids to develop assessment tools for the four main artificial intelligence trustworthiness criteria: S.A.F.E. (Sustainability, Accuracy, Fairness, and Explainability).

== Awards and honours ==
- 2021 – Top Italian Scientist (TIS) in Mathematics
- 2022 – Elected Fellow, International Statistical Institute

== Bibliography ==
=== Books ===
- Giudici, Paolo (2003). Applied data mining: statistical methods for business and industry. Wiley. ISBN 9780470871393.
- Giudici, Paolo; Figini, Silvia (2009). Applied Data Mining for Business and Industry. Wiley. ISBN 9780470058862.
- Duke, Toju; Giudici, Paolo (2025). Responsible AI in Practice: A Practical Guide to Safe and Human AI. Apress. ISBN 9798868811661.

=== Selected articles ===
- Giudici, P.; Green, P. J. (1999). "Decomposable graphical Gaussian model determination". Biometrika. 86 (4): 785–801. doi:10.1093/biomet/86.4.785.
- Brooks, S. P.; Giudici, P.; Roberts, G. O. (2003). "Efficient construction of reversible jump Markov chain Monte Carlo proposal distributions". Journal of the Royal Statistical Society Series B: Statistical Methodology. 65 (1): 3–39. doi:10.1111/1467-9868.03711.
- Giudici, Paolo; Spelta, Alessandro (2016). "Graphical network models for international financial flows". Journal of Business & Economic Statistics. 34 (1): 128–138. doi:10.1080/07350015.2015.1017643.
- Bussmann, N.; Giudici, P.; Marinelli, D.; Papenbrock, J. (2021). "Explainable machine learning in credit risk management". Computational Economics. 57 (1): 203–216. doi:10.1007/s10614-020-10042-0.
- Gramegna, A.; Giudici, P. (2021). "SHAP and LIME: an evaluation of discriminative power in credit risk". Frontiers in Artificial Intelligence. 4 752558. doi:10.3389/frai.2021.752558. PMC 8484963. PMID 34604738.
- Giudici, P.; Raffinetti, E. (2023). "SAFE Artificial Intelligence in finance". Finance Research Letters. 56 104088. doi:10.1016/j.frl.2023.104088.
- Babaei, G.; Giudici, P.; Raffinetti, E. (2025). "A rank graduation box for SAFE AI". Expert Systems with Applications. 259 125239. doi:10.1016/j.eswa.2024.125239.
