= Minore Mafia clan =

- Founded: 1910s
- Founding location: Castellammare del Golfo, Sicily
- Years active: 1910s–1986
- Territory: Trapani, Valderice and Paceco in Sicily
- Activities: Price fixing, Bid rigging, corruption
- Allies: Buccellato Mafia clan Catania Mafia family (until 1978); Corleonesi (1970s)
- Rivals: Rimi Mafia clan (1960s and 1970s); Corleonesi (1980s)

The Minore Mafia clan was a historical Sicilian Mafia clan originating from the city of Castellammare del Golfo on Sicily's west coast. It was probably founded sometime at the start of the 20th century.

From the 1950s, the Minore clan led the Trapani Mafia family and later rose to control the mandamento of Trapani. Their leadership lasted until a falling out with the Corleonesi, which led to the assassination of Totò Minore in 1982 and the subsequent decline of the family's influence.

== History and notable members ==
The first recorded mention of the clan is from the 1910s, when Salvatore Minore, nicknamed "Don Totò", was named as a powerful mafioso in the city. Minore's sister Elisabetta married Salvatore Maranzano, who would later emigrate to the United States and become an important figure within the American Mafia.

The best known members of the clan, however, are the Minore brothers and cousins who took control of the city of Trapani in the 1950s, taking over from Andrea Fazio. The boss thus became Antonio Salvatore Minore, commonly known as Totò Minore, who controlled the city and held great sway over the province together with his brothers Giovanni, Calogero, Giuseppe and Giacomo. Totò Minore, who was already well known to law enforcement and was banished as part of the "soggiorno obbligato" measure to the island of Ustica in 1948 for five years. Calogero Minore was considered the peacemaker of the family for his ability to mediate disputes in the region, and was tied to Mazara boss Leonardo Bonafede. The Minore clan went on to form a very strong alliance with the Buccellato Mafia clan, which like the Minores hailed from Castellammare del Golfo, and eventually came to control that city. Totò Minore was one of the mafiosi present at the 1957 Palermo Mafia summit with American crime boss Joe Bonanno. In 1966, Totò Minore emigrated to the United States and linked up to the Gambino family, opening up a series of pizzerias that were used as a front for narcotics trafficking. He also traveled to Libya, Brazil (where he owned a hotel) and Argentina (once with future Mafia pentito Tommaso Buscetta), and was involved in a large money laundering operation in mainland Italy and in the province of Trapani itself.

Totò Minore developed very close ties to the Catania Mafia family. In 1960, he was the godfather at the baptism of the son of Giuseppe Calderone, the Mafia boss of Catania. Minore was also in business relations with Carmelo Costanzo, dubbed one of "the four horsemen of the Mafia apocalypse" by journalist Pippo Fava. According to pentito Antonino Calderone, Minore was a family friend of Carmelo Costanzo and his other relatives, and some "men of honor" who were forced to leave the province of Trapani due to police attention were employed at the Costanzo facilities under Minore's direction. Both Totò and Calogero Minore came to own two hundred hectares of land each near Trapani, which were frequently used for Mafia summits and hiding fugitives, and they owned many businesses in and around the city, including tourism facilities, vehicle dealerships, cooperatives, and most importantly the city's banks.

Both the Minore and Buccellato clan developed a fierce rivalry with the Rimi Mafia clan over the course of the 1970s, and in turn with the Mafia family of Cinisi headed by Gaetano Badalamenti, who was related to the Rimis by marriage. The Minore and Buccellato clans resented the Rimis' strong links with the Palermitan families, and when Badalamenti was in power he even warned Minore against going to the province of Palermo under the threat of death. The emerging Corleonesi Mafia clan at this point backed the Minores and Buccellatos against the Rimis and Badalamentis in their quest to isolate the Palermo families. But while such threats of violence and other acts of hostility abounded, the rivalry never developed into a proper war.

The Minore clan was involved in a controversy in the late 1970s with the prosecutor of Trapani, Giangiacomo Ciaccio Montalto. Montalto was investigating Mafia activities in the city and province and scrutinized the Minore's many illegal dealings, including several kidnappings in the area such as the fake kidnapping of the businessman Rodittis and the kidnapping and murder of Luigi Corleo, the father-in-law of Nino Salvo. Montalto even ordered an exhumation of the elder brother Giovanni, who had died of natural causes, something which caused great resentment against him by the clan. Montalto issued an arrest warrant for Totò Minore in 1979 for weapons trafficking, and from then on the boss of Trapani and his brother lived as fugitives. Ciaccio Montalto would eventually be murdered in January 1983, and for a long time police suspected Totò Minore of being the organizer, although it later came to light that the murder was carried out by the Corleonesi and saw no involvement from the Minore clan.

== Decline ==
The Minore and Buccellato clans had been close to the Corleonesi clan of Totò Riina prior to the outbreak of the Second Mafia War. Nevertheless, as the war began, Riina saw them as unreliable due to their insistence on being neutral and most importantly, he was eager to weaken the two clans to reward his main allies in the province: Francesco Messina Denaro from Castelvetrano, Mariano Agate from Mazara del Vallo and Vincenzo Virga from Trapani.

On 20 November 1982, Totò Minore, Nicolò Miceli, Martino Buccellato from Castellammare del Golfo and Vincenzo Palazzolo from Cinisi were summoned to a meeting in Palermo by the boss of Partanna-Mondello, Rosario Riccobono. There, on the orders of Totò Riina, the four were strangled and their bodies made to disappear, a practice colloquially known as lupara bianca. News of the massacre did not emerge in mainstream media until 1998, when Calogero Ganci, son of Raffaele Ganci and one of the killers of Totò Minore, confessed to police. Underworld legend goes that Totò Minore's severed head, on Riina's orders, was delivered to his relatives as a warning. Ironically, this would be Rosario Riccobono's last betrayal on behalf of the Corleonesi, as the boss of Partanna-Mondello himself would be murdered in similar circumstances only ten days later, on 30 November. Totò Minore's brother Calogero remained a fugitive until 1986, when he was arrested while hiding in a house in Trapani. He died of natural causes in 1998, before any of his trials had concluded. Many other associates of the Minores were either murdered or forced to step down during the war, and the clan lost all of the power it had accumulated over decades in Sicily, as did the Buccellatos and many other "old guard" Mafia clans defeated by the Corleonesi.
