= Paolo Emiliani Giudici =

Italian writer and historian (1812–1872)

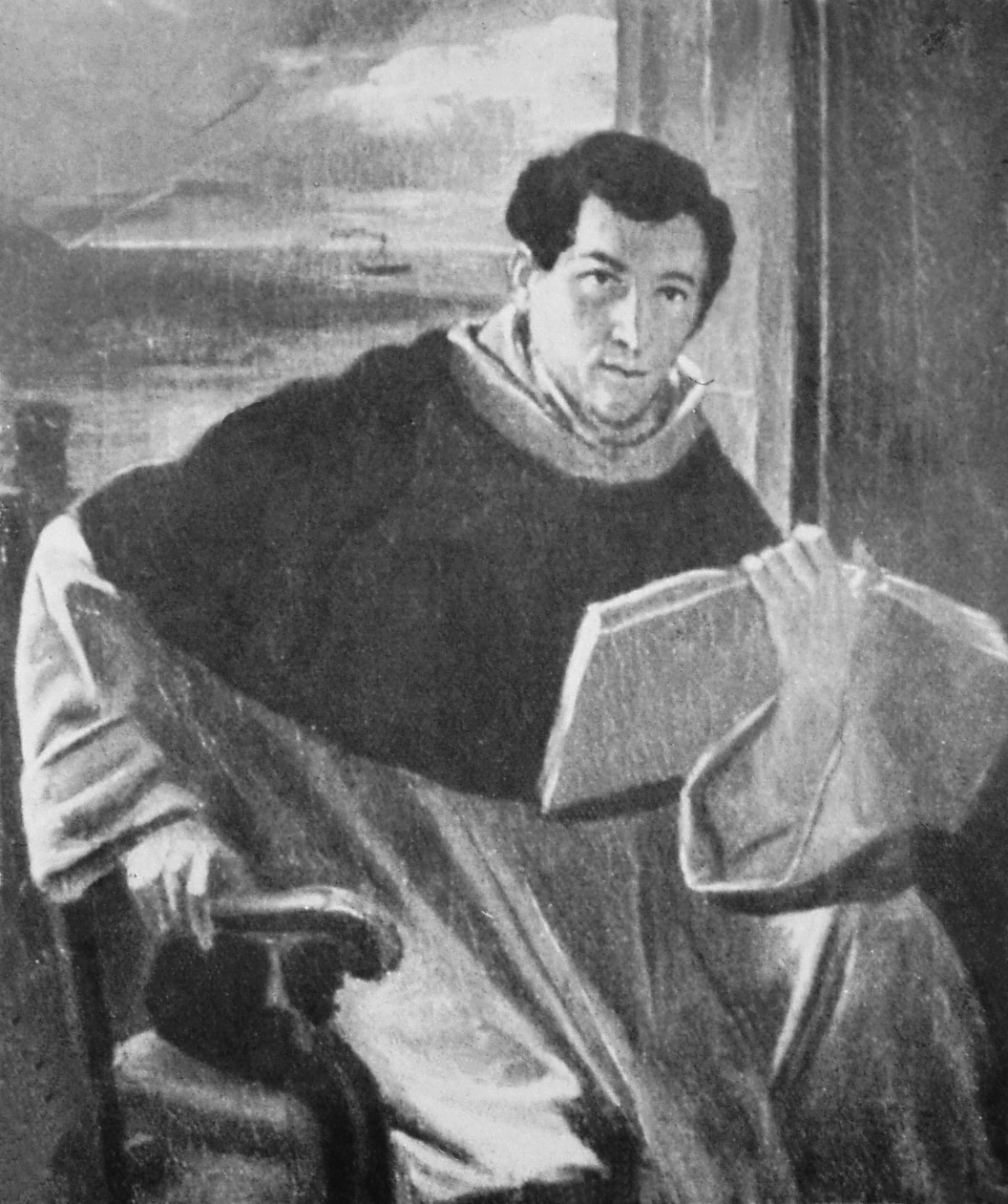
Paolo Emiliani Portrait

Paolo Emiliani Giudici (13 June 1812 – 8 September 1872), Italian writer, was born in the town of Mussomeli, in central Sicily, Italy.

== Biography ==
Paolo was initially educated by tutors until entering the Dominican convent of San Zita in Palermo. However, over the years, his superiors noted he was far more interested in artistic and political interests, and he separated from the order in 1840. Unable to find a position in Sicily and increasingly upsetting the authorities for his friendship with anti-bourbon Sicilians, he went into exile in Tuscany. There he was formally adopted by Annibale Emiliani, also in exile from Sicily.

His publication of History of Italian Literature (Storia della letteratura italiana, 1844) was a significant success. He gained an appointment in 1848 he became professor of Italian literature at Pisa, but after a few months was deprived of the chair on account of his liberal views in politics and religion. On the creation of the new Kingdom of Italy he became professor of aesthetics (replacing Giovanni Battista Niccolini and resigning 1862) and secretary of the Academy of Fine Arts at Florence, and in 1867 was elected to the chamber of deputies, representing a district in Sicily.

He held a prominent place as an historian, his works including a Storia del teatro (1860), and Storia dei comuni italiani (1861), besides a translation of Macaulay's History of England (1856).

In December 1862, in Tonbridge, he married a wealthy Englishwoman, Ann Alsager. For the next decade, he mainly resided in England, travelling with his wife through Europe. He died at Tonbridge on 8 September 1872.
