= Grand Hotel et des Palmes =

Historic hotel in Palermo, Italy

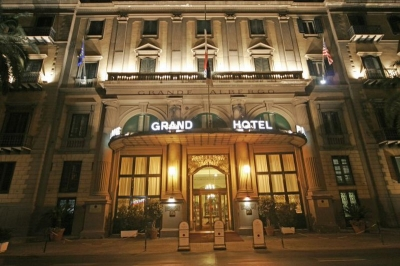

General information
- Location: Palermo, Sicily, Italy
- Coordinates: 38.123889°N 13.35922°E 38°07′26″N 13°21′33.2″E

The Grand Hotel et des Palmes is a historic hotel in Palermo, Sicily, on the central Via Roma.

The building was built on the initiative of the Ingham-Whitaker family in 1874 and used as a private residence. The house was connected by a secret passage to the adjacent Anglican church. Initially, the building consisted of a two-story low body with an exotic winter garden that reached the sea.

At the end of the 19th century, the house was sold to the knight Enrico Ragusa, who in 1907 commissioned the transformation of Palazzo Ingham in the Grande Albergo delle Palme to the architect Ernesto Basile. It became a luxury hotel, symbol of the Belle Époque. In November 2018 it was acquired by Algebris for roughly €12 million.

Notable people who have resided in the hotel include:

- Richard Wagner, the composer who in 1881 finished the composition of the Parsifal there;
- Raymond Roussel, the poet who lived there until his death;
- Aleister Crowley, the occultist who founded the Abbey of Thelema in Cefalù;
- Charles Poletti, who for political and then military reasons for the duration of the conflict, turned it into a US headquarters during the Second World War;
- José Enrique Rodó, Uruguayan writer and essayist, who spent his last days there.

== See also ==
- Grand Hotel des Palmes Mafia meeting 1957

== Bibliography ==
- Melinda Zacco, Grand Hotel et des Palmes - Storia e Mistero, Editions Zacco Pittographiae, Palermo 2005.

38°07′26″N 13°21′33.2″E
