= Salvatore "The Engineer" Greco =

Member of the Sicilian Mafia

Salvatore Greco (Italian: [salvaˈtoːre ˈɡrɛːko]; born 12 May 1924), also known as "l'ingegnere" ("The Engineer") or "Totò il lungo" ("Totò the tall"), was an Italian criminal and member of the Sicilian Mafia.

== Life ==
He was born in Ciaculli, as the son of Pietro Greco, who was killed during a bloody internal feud between the factions of the Greco Mafia clan in Ciaculli and Croceverde Giardini in 1946. His cousin Salvatore Greco "Ciaschiteddu" was the first ‘secretary’ of the Sicilian Mafia Commission.

== Position in the Mafia ==
Salvatore Greco "the engineer" is one of the most enigmatic mafiosi of the Sicilian Cosa Nostra. He was described as the "gray eminence of the entire organization, the one who held and pulled the strings, whether the task was to guide the extermination of enemies or to decide on strategies for moving drugs." He joined the masonic lodge Garibaldi in Palermo in 1946.

Judge Cesare Terranova, who investigated the Grecos and indicted them in the 1960s (when they were already at large), described "the engineer" as a pivotal figure in the international cigarette and heroin smuggling networks. He travelled constantly to Marseille, Tangier, Gibraltar, Malta, Milan and Genoa, all crucial nodes in the international trafficking circuit of the Mediterranean. In 1952, the name of "the engineer" was connected with heroin when a load of six kilograms sent to him by Frank Coppola was intercepted at Alcamo. Greco owned clandestine boats that changed names constantly.

== First Mafia war ==
The Greco cousins were protagonists in a bloody Mafia war between rival clans in Palermo in the early 1960s – known as the First Mafia War, a second started in the early 1980s – for the control of the profitable opportunities brought about by rapid urban growth and the illicit heroin trade to North America. The conflict was sparked by a quarrel over an underweight shipment of heroin and the murder of Calcedonio Di Pisa – an ally of the Grecos' – in December 1962. The Grecos suspected the brothers Salvatore and Angelo La Barbera of the attack.

On 30 June 1963, a car bomb exploded near "Ciaschiteddu" Greco’s house in Ciaculli, killing seven police and military officers sent to defuse it after an anonymous phone call. The outrage over the Ciaculli Massacre changed the Mafia war into a war against the Mafia. It prompted the first concerted anti-mafia efforts by the state in post-war Italy. The Sicilian Mafia Commission was dissolved and of those mafiosi who had escaped arrest, many went abroad.

== Fugitive ==
The repression caused by the Ciaculli Massacre disarranged the Sicilian heroin trade to the United States. Mafiosi were banned, arrested and incarcerated. Control over the trade fell into the hands of a few fugitives: the Greco cousins, Pietro Davì, Tommaso Buscetta and Gaetano Badalamenti.

Salvatore "The Engineer" was condemned to 10 years at the Trial of the 114 in 1968, but as he had been on the run since 1963, he did not serve a day. Interpol believed he was in Lebanon, where he controlled a slice of the international trafficking channels. Other sources say he moved to Venezuela. Of the two cousins, "the engineer" was the more accomplished and powerful, according to Interpol and the US Federal Bureau of Narcotics (FBN). In 1973 they were both given the maximum period of five years of internal banishment at the remote island of Asinara (now a national park), but they were nowhere to be found.

The sister of "the engineer", Girolama Greco, is married to Antonio Salamone of the San Giuseppe Jato Mafia. According to Mafia boss Giuseppe Guttadauro – overheard by the police during a ‘lesson’ about the history of the Mafia – Greco was still alive in 2001.
