= Lupara bianca =

Journalistic term

Lupara bianca (Italian pronunciation: [luˈpaːra ˈbjaŋka]; "white lupara") is a journalistic term for a Mafia murder done in such a way that the victim's body is never found. Typical ways to carry out a lupara bianca include burying a victim in the open countryside or in remote places where their body would be difficult to find, burying the victim in concrete at a construction site, or dissolving the body in acid and throwing the remains into the sea. This last method was widely used by the Sicilian Mafia's Corleonesi faction during the Second Mafia War, mostly taking place from 1981 to 1984. Other methods included dissolving a body in a wet lye pit, feeding remains to hogs, or pitching the victim (dead or alive) into a steel mill's molten metal. The lupara bianca prevents the family of the victim from holding a proper funeral, and it also destroys evidence that might point to the killers' identities. The term comes from the lupara, a weapon typically associated with the Sicilian Mafia.

== Examples ==
Sicilian Mafia member Santino Di Matteo's son Giuseppe's body was dissolved in acid in 1996, after 779 days of being held hostage. Italian investigative journalist Mauro De Mauro was kidnapped on the evening of 16 September 1970, while coming back home from work, in the via delle Magnolie in Palermo. Thousands of police and carabinieri with helicopters and dogs combed Sicily in vain in search of the reporter. De Mauro's body has never been found.

On 28 July 1980, John Favara was abducted and disappeared several months after he accidentally killed 12-year-old Frank Gotti, the son of mobster John Gotti. On March 10, the child had been riding a family friend's minibike carelessly into the path of Favara's vehicle when he was struck, and police concluded that Favara was not at fault. There were several witnesses to the abduction and accounts ranged from him being beaten with a baseball bat, shot with a silenced .22 caliber pistol, or both. Accounts differed on what was done with Favara's body. One account said that while Favara was alive, he was dismembered with a chainsaw, his remains were stuffed into a barrel filled with concrete and dumped in the ocean, or buried somewhere on the lot of a chop shop. In January 2009, Brooklyn federal court papers filed by federal prosecutors contained allegations that mob hitman Charles Carneglia killed Favara and disposed of his body in acid.

On 11 September 1982, Sicilian Mafia member Tommaso Buscetta's two sons, Benedetto and Antonio, from his first wife, disappeared, never to be found again, which later prompted his collaboration (pentito) with Italian authorities.

== See also ==
- Murder conviction without a body
