= Claire Sterling =

American journalist

Claire Sterling (née Neikind; October 21, 1919 – June 17, 1995) was an American author and journalist whose work focused on crime, political assassination, and terrorism. Her theories on Soviet bloc involvement in international terrorism and the attempted assassination of Pope John Paul II, presented in The Terror Network and The Time of the Assassins, respectively, were politically influential and controversial.

== Life ==
Sterling was born in Queens, New York City. She earned a bachelor's degree in economics at Brooklyn College, worked as a union organizer. After receiving a master's degree in journalism from Columbia University in 1945, she became the Rome correspondent of "a fly-by-night American news agency." When it folded, she joined The Reporter, which she wrote for until it ceased publication in 1968. Sterling began writing her second book after losing her job at The Reporter; it was published in 1969. She also wrote for various newspapers and magazines, including The New York Times, The Washington Post and Reader's Digest.

She married Thomas Sterling, a novelist, in 1951. After spending their honeymoon in Italy the two moved there, living in Rome for several decades. They had two children. She died of cancer at age 75, in a hospital in Arezzo.

== Work as an author ==
Her first book, titled Our Goal was Palestine, was published by Victor Gollancz under her maiden name Claire Neikind in 1946, it is described as 'an American journalist writes of her experiences in a refugee ship.' She was at this time reportedly 'the Rome correspondent of the Overseas News Agency', which was a covert British propaganda operation run by British Security Co-ordination, set up in New York City by the British Secret Intelligence Service (MI6) upon the authorisation of Prime Minister Winston Churchill.

Sterling's second book revisited the 1948 death of Jan Masaryk, the Czechoslovak foreign minister, which she blamed on Soviet or Czechoslovak Stalinists. More controversial were her books The Terror Network (1981) and The Time of the Assassins (1984). In the former book, which was translated into 22 languages, she claimed that Soviet Union was a major source of backing behind terrorist groupings around the world. The book was read and appreciated by Alexander Haig and William Casey, but its arguments were dismissed by the CIA's Soviet analysts; Lincoln Gordon one of three members of a senior review panel at the CIA charged with bringing non-intelligence professional and academic review to the agency discovered comparing CIA intelligence reports and the book at Casey's request that at least some of Sterling's claims had come from stories that the CIA itself had planted in the Italian press.

Sterling was the first to claim (in a September 1982 article in Reader's Digest) that the 1981 assassination attempt on Pope John II had been ordered by the Bulgarian Secret Service, a theory that became known as the "Bulgarian Connection" She was one of three journalists who developed and published details supporting the theory - the others were Paul Henze, a propaganda expert and former CIA station chief in Turkey, and Michael Ledeen, associated with the Georgetown Center for Strategic and International Studies (CSIS) in Washington, a right-wing think tank. Ledeen had strong connections with a faction of the Italian secret service (SISMI) linked to the Propaganda Due secret masonic lodge, which first revealed the fraudulent proposed attack on the Pope by the Soviet Minister of Defence Dmitry Ustinov. The three journalists wrote articles and appeared on television and her and Henze's books were enthusiastically reviewed. Individually, or as a team, the two were repeatedly invited as guests on to the three principal American networks and programmes on British television. They insisted that no expert who supported a contrasting view be interviewed with them on the same programme and, in most cases, the producers obliged. The Sterling-Henze duo was almost able to monopolise coverage of the story. In the American media, for a certain time, it became almost impossible to express a different view and anyone who did was considered unpatriotic at best. The "Bulgarian Connection" theory has also been, in detail, refuted and attributed to bias by Edward S. Herman and Noam Chomsky in Manufacturing Consent. The Time of the Assassins dealt with the assassination attempt and advanced this now-discredited theory. Her last two books dealt with the Sicilian Mafia and post-Communist globalized organized crime, respectively.

== Books ==
- Our Goal Was Palestine. London: Victor Gollancz (1946).

A 28-page pamphlet published as Claire Neikind.

- The Masaryk Case. New York: Harper & Row (1969). LCCN 70-83623.
- The Terror Network: The Secret War of International Terrorism. New York: Berkley (1981). ISBN 978-0425053409, 0425053407.
- The Time of the Assassins. New York: Holt, Rinehart, and Winston (1984). ISBN 978-0030635540, 0030635543.
- Octopus: The Long Reach of the International Sicilian Mafia. New York: Simon & Schuster (1990). ISBN 0671734024.
  - UK ed.: The Mafia: The Long Reach of the International Sicilian Mafia. London: Hamish Hamilton (1990).
- Thieves' World: The Threat of the New Global Network of Organized Crime. New York: Simon & Schuster (1994). ISBN 978-0671749972, 0671749978.
  - UK ed.: Crime Without Frontiers. London: Warner (1995).
