= Carmine Galante =

American mobster and boss (1910–1979)

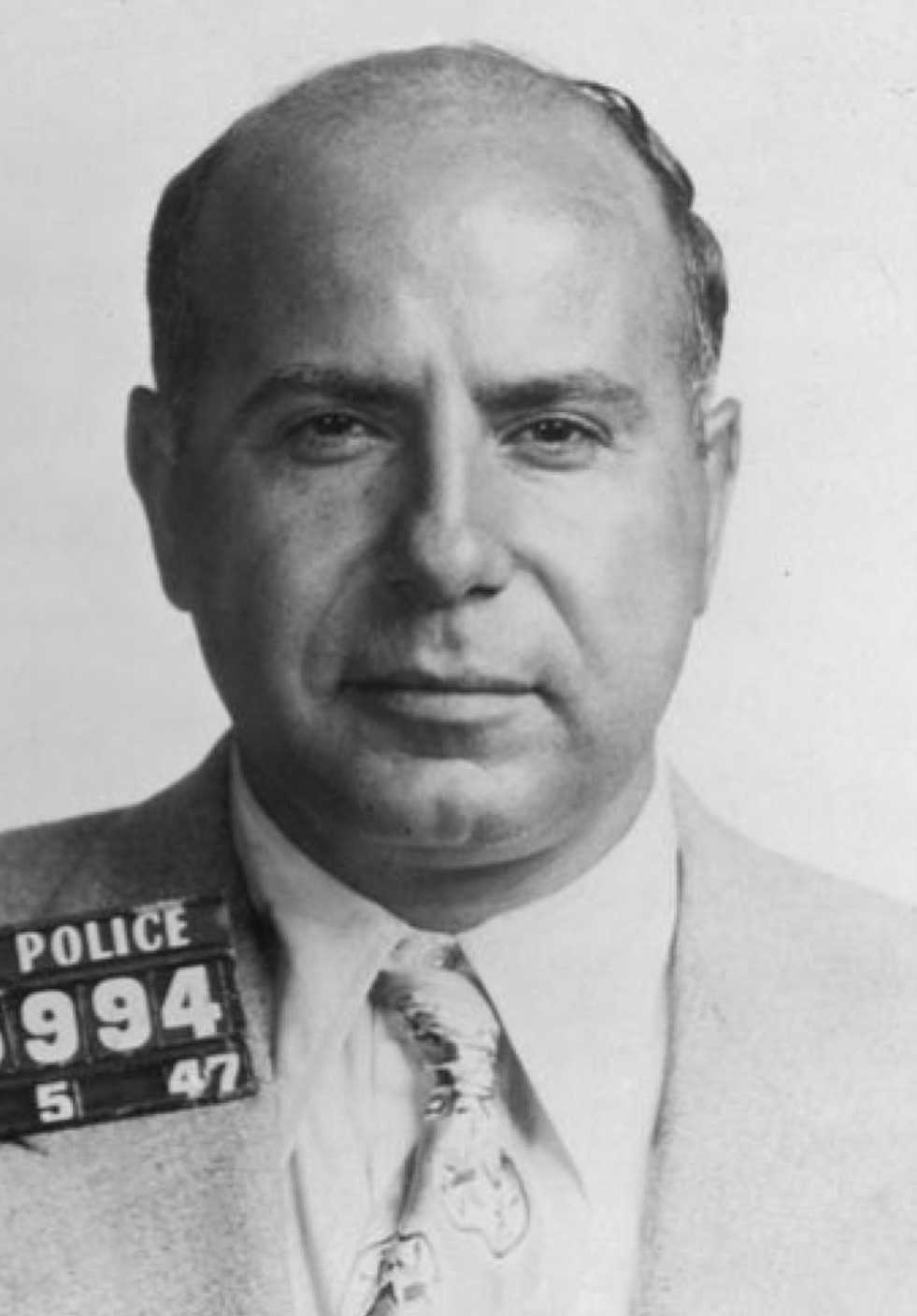
- Mugshot of Galante in 1947
- Born: February 21, 1910; New York City, New York, U.S.
- Died: July 12, 1979 (aged 69); New York City, New York, U.S.
- Cause of death: Gunshot wounds
- Resting place: Saint John's Cemetery, Queens, New York City, New York, U.S.
- Other names: "Lilo", "The Cigar", "The Heroin Don".
- Occupation: Crime boss
- Spouse: Helen Marulli (m. 1945)
- Children: 5
- Allegiance: Bonanno crime family
- Convictions: Contempt of court (1961); Drug trafficking (1962)
- Penalty: 20 days' imprisonment 20 years' imprisonment and fined $20,000

Camillo Carmine Galante (Italian: [ˈkarmine ɡaˈlante]; February 21, 1910 – July 12, 1979) was an American mafioso who was de facto boss of the Bonanno crime family of New York City. Law enforcement accused Galante of participating in between 80 and 100 murders, with an extensive arrest record dating back to 1926 for murder, assault, robbery, grand larceny, alcohol tax violation and narcotics. According to FBI files, Galante served as an enforcer for Vito Genovese during the 1930s and 1940s. During the 1950s, he ran an international narcotics ring with Joe Bonanno. Galante also attended the infamous October 1957 Apalachin meeting.

Between 1958 and 1960, Galante was indicted for drug trafficking. In 1962 he was sentenced to twenty years in prison and was paroled in 1974. He was rarely seen without a cigar hanging from his mouth, leading to the nickname "The Cigar" and "Lilo", named after the Italian slang word for "a stubby little cigar". Galante was assassinated on Commission orders in 1979 while dining at the patio of a Brooklyn restaurant, alongside his cousin Giuseppe Turano and Bonanno associate Leonardo Coppola.

== Background ==
Camillo Carmine Galante was born on February 21, 1910, in a tenement building in the East Harlem section of Manhattan in New York City. His parents, Vincenzo "James" Galante and Vincenza Russo, had emigrated from Castellammare del Golfo, Sicily, Italy, in 1906, where Vincenzo had been a fisherman. Galante had two brothers, Samuel and Peter, and two sisters, Josephine and Angelina. On February 10, 1945, he married Helen Marulli, by whom he had three children: James, Camille and Angela. For the last twenty years of his life, Galante lived with Ann Acquavella; the couple had two children together. He was the uncle of Bonanno crime family caporegime (captain) James Carmine Galante.

While in prison in 1931, doctors diagnosed Galante as having a psychopathic personality. He owned the Rosina Costume Company in Brooklyn and was associated with the Abco Vending Company of West New York, New Jersey.

== Criminal career ==
=== Early years ===
At the age of 10, Galante was sent to reform school due to his criminal activities. He soon formed a juvenile street gang on Manhattan's Lower East Side. By the age of 15, Galante had dropped out of seventh grade. He subsequently became a Mafia associate during the Prohibition era, becoming a high-ranking enforcer by the end of the decade. During this period, Galante also worked as a fish sorter and at an artificial flower shop. On December 12, 1925, the fifteen-year-old Galante pleaded guilty to assault charges. On December 22, 1926, he was sentenced to at least two and a half years in state prison.

In August 1930, Galante was arrested for the murder of New York Police Department (NYPD) officer Walter DeCastilla that occurred during a payroll robbery. However, he was never indicted. Also in 1930, NYPD officer Joseph Meenahan caught Galante and other gang members attempting to hijack a truck in Williamsburg, Brooklyn. In the ensuing gun battle, Galante wounded Meenahan and a six-year-old bystander; both survived. On February 8, 1931, after pleading guilty to attempted robbery, Galante was sentenced to twelve and a half years in the state prison. On May 1, 1939, Galante was released from prison on parole.

By 1940, Galante was carrying out "hits" for Vito Genovese, the official underboss of the Luciano crime family (now the Genovese crime family). Galante had an underworld reputation for viciousness and was suspected by the NYPD of involvement in over eighty murders. In 1943, Galante allegedly murdered Carlo Tresca, the publisher of an anti-fascist newspaper in New York. Genovese, living in exile in Italy, offered to kill Tresca as a favor to Italian dictator Benito Mussolini. Genovese allegedly gave the murder contract to Galante. On January 11, 1943, Galante allegedly shot and killed Tresca as he stepped outside his newspaper office in Manhattan, and then got in a car and drove away. Although Galante was arrested as a suspect, no one was ever charged in the murder. After the Tresca murder, Galante was sent back to prison on a parole violation. On December 21, 1944, Galante was released.

=== Later years ===
In 1953, boss Joseph Bonanno sent Galante to Montreal, Quebec, Canada, to organize the family’s drug business and rackets there. He worked with Vincenzo Cotroni of the Cotroni crime family in the French Connection, in which the Bonannos imported huge amounts of heroin by ship into Montreal and then smuggled it into the United States. Police also estimated that Galante was collecting gambling profits in Montreal worth about $50 million per year. In April 1956, due to his strong-arm extortion tactics, the Canadian government deported Galante back to the U.S.

In October 1957, Bonanno and Galante, now a consigliere, held a meeting at the Grand Hotel et des Palmes in Palermo, Sicily, on plans to import heroin into the U.S. Attendees included Lucky Luciano and American mobsters, with a Sicilian Mafia delegation led by Giuseppe Genco Russo. As part of the agreement, Sicilian mobsters would come to the U.S. to distribute the narcotics. Galante brought many young men, known as zips, from his family home of Castellammare del Golfo to work as bodyguards, contract killers and drug traffickers. In 1958, after being indicted on drug conspiracy charges, Galante went into hiding. On June 3, 1959, New Jersey State Police officers arrested Galante after stopping his car on the Garden State Parkway close to New York. Federal agents had recently discovered that he had been hiding in a house on Pelican Island off the Jersey shore. After posting $100,000 bail, he was released.

On May 18, 1960, Galante was indicted on a second set of narcotics charges; he surrendered voluntarily. Galante's first narcotics trial started on November 21, 1960; one of his co-defendants was William Bentvena, a Gambino made man who was murdered by mob associates James Burke and Thomas DeSimone. From the beginning, the first trial was characterized by jurors and alternates dropping out and coercive courtroom displays by the defendants. On May 15, 1961, the judge declared a mistrial. Galante was sentenced to twenty days in jail for contempt of court. On July 10, 1962, after being convicted in his second narcotics trial, Galante was sentenced to twenty years in federal prison and fined $20,000.

=== Power grab ===
In January 1974, Galante was released from prison on parole. Following his release, he allegedly ordered the bombing of the private mausoleum of his enemy Frank Costello, who had died in 1973, in St. Michael's Cemetery. On February 23, 1974, at a meeting at the Americana Hotel in Manhattan, the governing body known as the Commission named Philip "Rusty" Rastelli as Bonnano boss. When Rastelli was sent to prison in 1976, Galante seized control of the Bonannos as unofficial acting boss and in turn becoming de facto boss.

During the late 1970s, Galante allegedly organized the murders of at least eight members of the Gambino family, with whom he had an intense rivalry, to take over a massive drug trafficking operation. On March 3, 1978, Galante's parole was revoked by the United States Parole Commission for allegedly associating with other Bonanno mobsters, and he was sent back to prison. However, on February 27, 1979, a judge ruled that the government had illegally revoked Galante's parole and ordered his immediate release.

== Assassination ==
Galante shot dead at a restaurant patio with a cigar still held between his teeth

The Five Families of New York were alarmed at Galante's brazen attempt to take over the narcotics market. Genovese family boss Frank Tieri began contacting other mob leaders to build a consensus for Galante's murder, even obtaining approval from the retired Bonanno. In 1979, they received a boost when the Bonnano family's official boss, Rastelli, sought Commission approval to kill Galante. Joseph Massino, a Bonanno soldier loyal to Rastelli, relayed the request to the Commission, which swiftly approved a contract on Galante.

On July 12, 1979, Galante was killed just as he finished eating lunch on an open patio at Joe and Mary's Italian-American Restaurant at 205 Knickerbocker Avenue in Bushwick, Brooklyn. He was dining with Leonard Coppola, a Bonanno captain and staunch Galante loyalist, and restaurant owner/cousin Giuseppe Turano, a Bonanno soldier. Also sitting at the table were Galante's Sicilian bodyguards, Baldassare Amato and Cesare Bonventre. At 2:45 pm, three men wearing balaclavas entered the restaurant, walked to the patio and opened fire with shotguns and handguns. Galante, Turano and Coppola were killed instantly. A picture of the murdered Galante showed a cigar still in his mouth. Amato and Bonventre, who had done nothing to protect Galante, were left unharmed. The gunmen then ran out of the restaurant.

=== Aftermath ===
The Archdiocese of New York refused to allow a funeral mass for Galante due to his notoriety. He was buried at Saint John's Cemetery in Middle Village, Queens. In 1984, Bonventre was found murdered in a New Jersey warehouse, allegedly to guarantee his silence in the Galante murder. On January 13, 1987, Anthony Indelicato was sentenced to forty years in prison, as a defendant in the Commission trial, for the Galante, Coppola and Turano murders.

== Books ==
- Pistone, Joseph D.; & Woodley, Richard (1999) Donnie Brasco: My Undercover Life in the Mafia, Hodder & Stoughton. ISBN 0-340-66637-4.
- Pistone, Joseph D.; & Brandt, Charles (2007). Donnie Brasco: Unfinished Business, Running Press. ISBN 0-7624-2707-8.
- DeStefano, Anthony. The Last Godfather: Joey Massino & the Fall of the Bonanno Crime Family. California: Citadel, 2006.
