= Tommaso Buscetta =

Sicilian Mafia boss and government informant

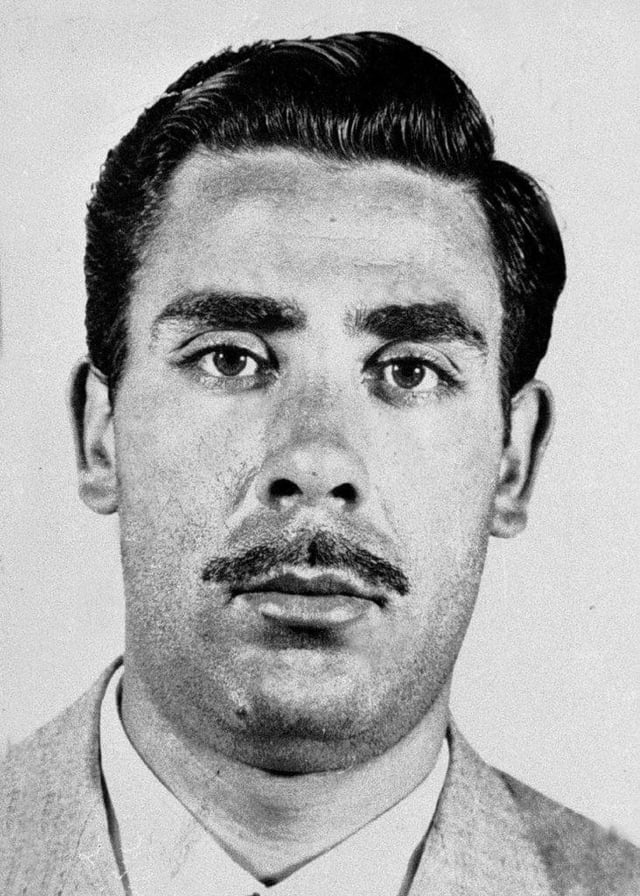
- Tommaso Buscetta in an undated photograph, c. 1950s
- Born: 13 July 1928; Palermo, Sicily, Kingdom of Italy
- Died: 2 April 2000 (aged 71); Florida, United States
- Resting place: North Miami, Florida, U.S.
- Other names: "The Boss of Two Worlds" "Don Masino"
- Occupation: Mobster
- Spouses: Melchiorra Cavallaro (m. 1944) Vera Girotti (m. 1966; dis. 1968) Cristina De Almeida Guimarães (m. 1968)
- Children: 8
- Allegiance: Porta Nuova Mafia family / Sicilian Mafia
- Conviction: Drug trafficking (1972)
- Penalty: 10 years imprisonment; reduced to eight years on appeal

Tommaso Buscetta (Italian pronunciation: [tomˈmaːzo buʃˈʃetta]; 13 July 1928 – 2 April 2000), also known as "Don Masino" or "The Boss of Two Worlds" (Italian: il boss dei due mondi), was a high-ranking Italian mobster and a member of the Sicilian Mafia. He became one of the first of its members to turn informant (pentito) and explain the inner workings of the organization.

Buscetta participated in criminal activity in Italy, the United States and Brazil before being arrested and extradited from Brazil to Italy. He became disillusioned with the Mafia after the murders of several of his family members, and in 1984, decided to cooperate with the authorities. He provided important testimony at the 1986/87 Maxi Trial, the largest anti-Mafia trial in history. After the murder of the judges Giovanni Falcone and Paolo Borsellino, Buscetta gave further testimony to the Antimafia Commission linking Italian politicians to the Mafia. Buscetta entered the Witness Protection Program in the United States, where he remained until his death in 2000.

== Early life ==
Tommaso Buscetta was born on 13 July 1928, in Palermo, Sicily, the youngest of 17 children; his father was a glazier. Buscetta was raised in Kalsa, a poverty-stricken area of Palermo, which he escaped by getting involved with crime at a young age. He first became involved with the Sicilian Mafia in 1945, and in the following years, he became a full-fledged member of the Porta Nuova mandamento, where he worked mostly in cigarette smuggling.

Buscetta married his first wife Melchiorra Cavallaro in 1944 and had three children. In 1949, he moved to Argentina and then to Brazil, where he opened a glassworks store, but in 1956, he returned to Palermo where he joined Angelo La Barbera and Salvatore "Ciaschiteddu" Greco together with mafiosi Antonino Sorci, Pietro Davì and Gaetano Badalamenti, dealing with the cigarette and drug smuggling. He married his second wife Vera Girotti in 1966 and had one child. Two years later, he married his third wife Cristina De Almeida Guimarães after moving to Brazil, and had four children. In 1958 he was arrested for cigarette smuggling and criminal association during an investigation conducted by the Guardia di Finanza against the Corsican Pascal Molinelli and the Tangerian Salomon Gozal, indicated as major suppliers of cigarettes and drugs for the Sicilian gangs. In January 1959 he was arrested again for the smuggling of two tons of cigarettes to supply Yugoslavia.

== First arrest ==
After the Ciaculli massacre in 1963, part of an internal Mafia conflict known as the First Mafia War, he was wanted by the police. Buscetta fled to Switzerland, Mexico, Canada, and finally, the United States. In 1968, Buscetta was convicted in absentia by an Italian court of two murders related to the Ciaculli massacre.

On 25 August 1970, Buscetta was arrested in Brooklyn, New York, but was released on 4 December 1970. On 21 July 1971, an arrest warrant was issued by Italian police. Buscetta moved to Brazil, having undergone plastic surgery and vocal cord surgery, he set up a drug trafficking network. He partnered with the French drug trafficker Lucien Sarti. In February 1972 Buscetta, Sarti, Carlo Zippo from New York, and various French associates held a meeting at the Copacabana Palace hotel and came up with a new network and buyer system. On 3 November 1972, was arrested by the Brazilian military government, and subsequently extradited to Italy exactly one month later where he began a ten-year sentence at Palermo's Ucciardone prison for drug trafficking, reduced to eight years after appeal. He was later transferred to the Le Nuove prison in Turin.

== Second arrest ==
In February 1980, he was granted "half-freedom", immediately fleeing back to Brazil to escape the brewing Second Mafia War instigated by Salvatore Riina. On 11 September 1982, Buscetta's two sons from his first wife, Benedetto and Antonio, disappeared, never to be found again, which prompted his collaboration with Italian authorities. This was followed by the deaths of his brother Vincenzo, son-in-law Giuseppe Genova, brother-in-law Pietro and four of his nephews, Domenico and Benedetto Buscetta, and Orazio and Antonio D'Amico. The war subsequently led to the deaths of many of Buscetta's allies, including Stefano Bontade. Buscetta was arrested again in São Paulo, Brazil on 23 October 1983. He was extradited to Italy on 28 June 1984, where he attempted suicide by ingestion of barbiturates; when that failed, he decided that he was utterly disillusioned with the Mafia. Buscetta asked to talk to the anti-Mafia judge Giovanni Falcone, and began his life as an informant, referred to as a pentito.

== Pentito ==
Buscetta (in sunglasses) is led into court at the Maxi Trial, circa 1986.

Buscetta revealed information to Falcone for 45 days, explaining the inner workings and hierarchical structures of Cosa Nostra including the Sicilian Mafia Commission, that, until then, were unclear because of the strict code of silence. Buscetta's explanation of the internal structure of the Mafia became known as the "Buscetta theorem". He also revealed Mafia initiation rituals. Buscetta refused to speak with Falcone of the political ties of Cosa Nostra because, in his opinion, the state was not ready for statements of that magnitude, and proved to be quite general on that subject.

In December 1984, he was extradited to the United States where he received a new identity from the government and American citizenship and was placed in the Witness Protection Program in exchange for new revelations against the American Mafia. He testified in the Pizza Connection Trial, which took place in 1985 in New York and saw defendants Gaetano Badalamenti and other Sicilian-American mafiosi accused of drug trafficking. He also testified in 1986 at the largest trial against the Mafia in history, the Maxi Trial in Palermo, arising from the statements made to Falcone. Buscetta helped judges Falcone and Paolo Borsellino achieve significant success in the fight against organized crime, which led to 475 Mafia members indicted and 338 convicted; those sentences were upheld in 1992.

In mid-1992, following the bomb attacks in which Falcone and Borsellino were killed, Buscetta began to speak of the political ties of the Cosa Nostra with magistrates, accusing Salvo Lima, killed a few months earlier, and Giulio Andreotti of being the main political referents of the organization; in particular, he reported that he had known Lima personally since the late 1950s, and had met him last in 1980, and also reported that he had learned that the murder of the journalist Mino Pecorelli in 1979 would have been carried out in Andreotti's interest. Buscetta was one of the main witnesses of the trials against Andreotti for mafia association and for the Pecorelli murder. Andreotti was eventually acquitted in 1999 of the charge of having commissioned the assassination of Pecorelli. In court, Buscetta also elaborated in great detail the hidden exchanges that linked politicians and the Mafia. He stated:

It is not Cosa Nostra that contacts the politician; instead a member of the Cosa Nostra says, that president is mine (è cosa mia), and if you need a favor, you must go through me. In other words, the Cosa Nostra figure maintains a sort of monopoly on that politician. Every family head in the Mafia selects a man whose characteristics already make him look approachable. Forget the idea that some pact is reached first. On the contrary, one goes to that candidate and says, "Onorevole, I can do this and that for you now, and we hope that when you are elected you will remember us". The candidate wins and he has to pay something back. You tell him, "We need this, will you do it or not?". The politician understands immediately and acts always.

During a trial in 1993, the Mafia member Salvatore Cancemi confessed to Buscetta that he had strangled two of Buscetta's sons to death. After the trial, Buscetta embraced Cancemi and said: "You could not refuse the order. I forgive you because I know what it means to be in Cosa Nostra."

== Death ==
Buscetta died of cancer on 2 April 2000, aged 71, having lived out most of his life in hiding with his third wife and family in Florida, United States, under false names. He was buried under a false name in North Miami, Florida.

== In popular culture ==
He was played by F. Murray Abraham in the 1999 film Excellent Cadavers. He was played by Vincent Riotta in the 2007 mini-series Il Capo dei Capi. He was portrayed by Sergio Vespertino in the 2016 Italian TV series The Mafia Kills Only in Summer. He was portrayed by Pierfrancesco Favino in the 2019 film The Traitor, directed by Marco Bellocchio and selected to compete for the Palme d'Or at the 2019 Cannes Film Festival. Also released in 2019, Our Godfather is a documentary by Mark Franchetti and Andrew Meier which includes onscreen testimony by Buscetta's third wife and surviving children "who still live in anonymity because of fear of reprisal", according to one review.
