= L'Ora =

Sicilian daily newspaper

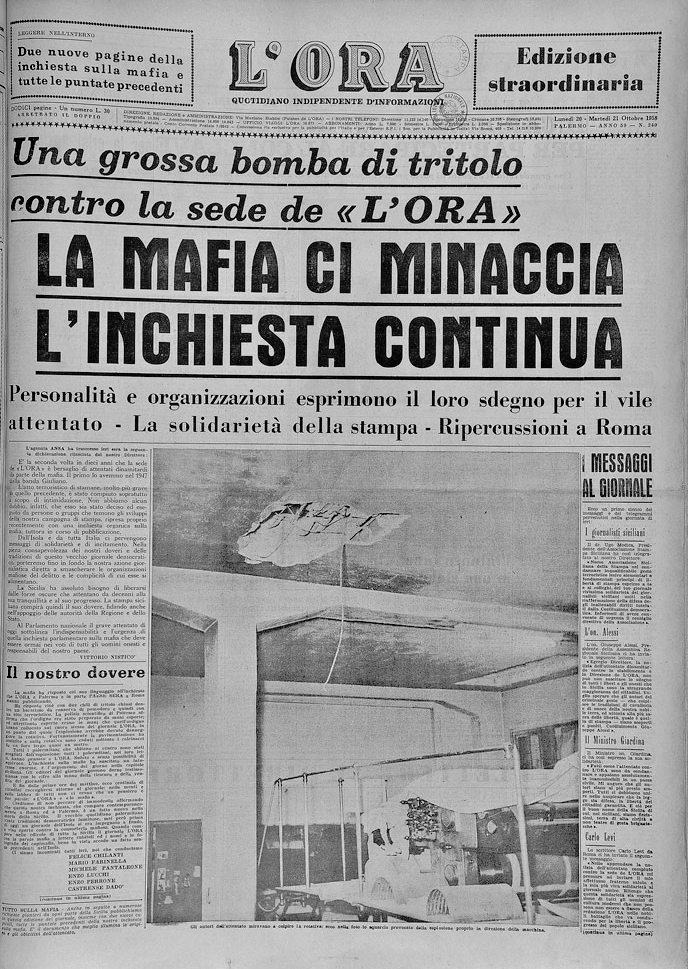
- The frontpage of L'Ora after a Mafia bomb attack against the paper in 1958
- Type: Daily newspaper
- Founder: Florio family from Palermo
- Founded: April 22, 1900
- Ceased publication: May 8, 1992
- Political alignment: Republican and progressive, later left-leaning
- Language: Italian
- Headquarters: Piazzetta Napoli (Palermo)
- City: Palermo, Sicily
- Country: Italy

L'Ora (English: "The Hour") was a Sicilian daily newspaper published in Palermo. The paper was founded in 1900 and stopped being published in 1992. In the 1950s–1980s the evening paper was known for its investigative reporting about political corruption in Palermo and into the Sicilian Mafia, when the Italian Communist Party took ownership. The Mafia made it a target: a bomb exploded in the press room in 1958, and its journalists Cosimo Cristina and Giovanni Spampinato were murdered in 1960 and 1972, while investigative reporter Mauro De Mauro disappeared without trace in 1970.

== Foundation and early years ==
The paper was founded on the initiative of the entrepreneurial Florio family from Palermo with interests in shipping, shipbuilding, trade, the wine industry, fisheries, mining, metallurgy and ceramics. The first issue was published on April 22, 1900. The formal owner was Carlo Di Rudinì, the son of the former prime minister of Italy Antonio Di Rudinì, but the main shareholder and financier was Ignazio Florio Jr. The first editor of the paper until 1902 was Vincenzo Morello, one of the most respected Italian political journalists of the time. Before directing L'Ora, Morello had worked for La Tribuna, at that time the most widespread newspaper in the center-south of Italy. Other collaborators were Napoleone Colajanni, Francesco Saverio Nitti and Luigi Capuana.

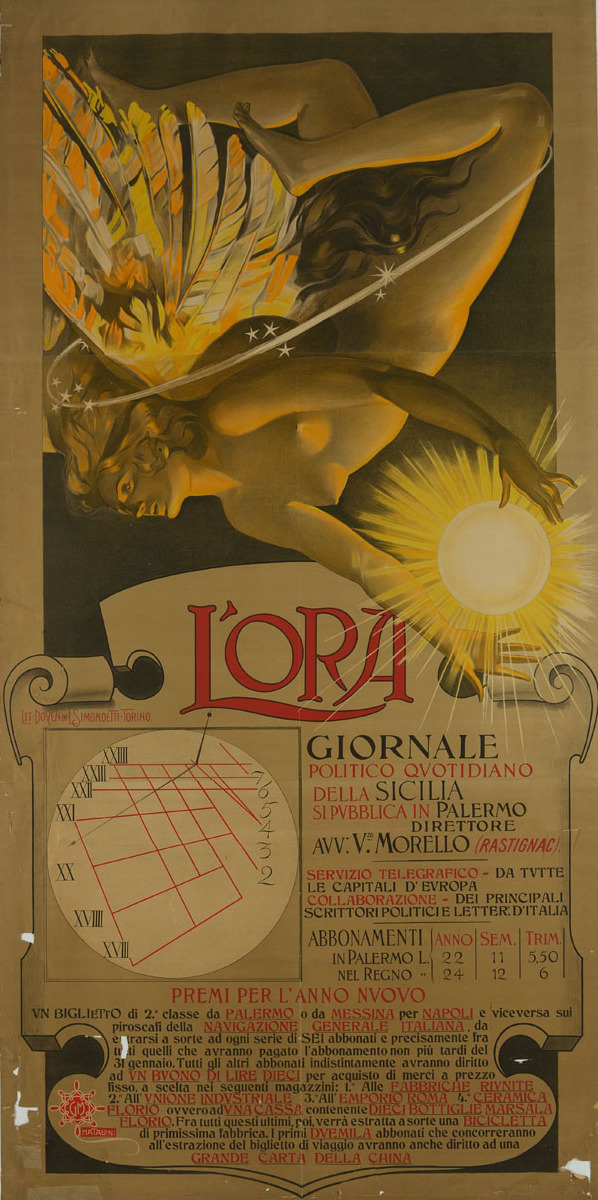
Early 20th-century advertising poster of L'Ora by Giovanni Maria Mataloni

From 1904 to 1907, the newspaper was edited by Edoardo Scarfoglio, already the founder and editor of the daily Il Mattino in Naples. L'Ora became a newspaper with a European outlook and agreements were made for the exchange of information with other major foreign newspapers including Le Matin of Paris, The Times of London and the U.S. daily The New York Sun. A correspondent was sent to Tokyo and correspondence offices were opened in Vienna and Berlin. Many prestigious collaborators appeared in the newspaper's cultural pages, including Matilde Serao (Scarfoglio's wife), Luigi Pirandello, Salvatore Di Giacomo and Giovanni Verga.

The political direction of the newspaper was generally republican and progressive, representing the Sicilian entrepreneurial middle class. After the First World War the editorial line turned against the rise of fascism. During this period one of the significant contributors was Alberto Cianca. In November 1926, in the aftermath of the failed attack against Benito Mussolini in Bologna, the paper was suppressed, along with other anti-Fascist newspapers.

L'Ora reappeared in January 1927 under the direction of Nicola Pascazio, a man close to the Fascist regime, former editor of the Il Popolo d'Italia ("People of Italy"), the organ of the National Fascist Party, with the subtitle "fascist newspaper of the Mediterranean". The Allied invasion of Sicily in July 1943 resulted in the suspension of the newspaper, but publishing resumed on April 8, 1946.

The paper changed ownership several times. In 1954, the widow of the last owner sold the newspaper to the GATE company, which was owned by the Italian Communist Party (Partito Comunista Italiano – PCI) and directed by Amerigo Terenzi, already in charge of the newspaper Paese Sera.

== Golden years ==
Under the new ownership, the newspaper enjoyed its golden years under the editor-in-chief Vittorio Nistico, who directed the paper between 1954 and 1975. In this period the journal developed into a newspaper that published many investigative reports about the Sicilian Mafia, in an era that the organisation was hardly mentioned. In 1958, the paper printed the word 'Mafia'—an unmentionable word in those years—in enormous letters spread over the front page, when the published a series of articles about Mafia boss Luciano Leggio.

L'Ora published the series of investigative reports about the rise of Mafia boss Leggio in Corleone after the killing of the previous boss Michele Navarra in August 1958, by reporters Felice Chilanti, Mario Farinella, Enzo Lucchi, Michele Pantaleone, Castrense Dadò and Enzo Perrone. The retaliation of Leggio was swift: at 4:52 a.m. on October 19, 1958, a bomb of five kilos TNT exploded in front the newspaper office blowing up half the printing press. Two days later the paper appeared again; the front-page headline read: "The mafia threatens us, the investigation continues" (see Infobox). The newspaper was not intimidated: "Today’s outrage must bring home to the National Parliament the urgent necessity of a Parliamentary inquiry into the Mafia. Such an inquiry must now be in the forefront of every responsible and upright citizen’s thoughts," the editorial demanded.

In June 1961, L'Ora published a groundbreaking three-part investigative report on what they labelled the "sacco di Palermo" (Sack of Palermo), about the profitable real-estate fraud taking place in the city during the early 1960s that that led to the destruction of the city's green belt and historic villas to make way for characterless and shoddily-constructed apartment blocks. Since those reports, this devastation of parts of Palermo has been known by that name: the Sack of Palermo. At that time, the role of the Mafia in property speculation was not yet clear, but in later reports in 1963 and 1964 the newspaper identified the so-called VA.LI.GIO business consortium (from Vassallo-Gioia-Lima), consisting of the builder Francesco Vassallo and the two Christian Democratic leaders, Giovanni Gioia and Palermo mayor Salvo Lima which together with the DC councillor for public works, Vito Ciancimino, were responsible for destroying the layout of Palermo.

The price of the journal's civic engagement was the killing of three of its journalists. The first was Cosimo Cristina, who was killed on May 5, 1960, investigating the Mafia in the area of Termini Imerese. Next was Mauro De Mauro who disappeared on September 16, 1970, investigating the involvement of the Mafia with the death of Eni president Enrico Mattei. And finally, Giovanni Spampinato, who was killed on October 27, 1972, while looking into the activities of neo-fascism in Sicily and Mafia smuggling activities along the east coast of Sicily.

== Decline ==
In the 1970s, the newspaper started to have financial problems. As an afternoon paper, it was more vulnerable to the competition of TV news than its main competitor, the Giornale di Sicilia. The paper also lost support of the PCI that decided to concentrate on its main publication L'Unità in combination with the historic compromise, trying to accommodate the Christian Democrats (DC).

Although L'Ora changed to publish as a morning newspaper in 1976, the costs that this entailed proved to be excessive and in 1979 the PCI decided the closure of the newspaper. L'Ora, however, "refused to die": a cooperative of journalists and administrators got the right to use the title and the property, while a cooperative of workers got the use of the equipment under the same conditions. The measures were taken in the hope of acquiring financial and editorial independence. Nevertheless, by 1980 the Giornale di Sicilia managed to take advantage of the paper's weakened position and demoralized staff to lure away four of its younger and promising reporters (Roberto Ciuno, Francesco La Licata, Daniele Billiteri and Franco Nicastro) to form a new crime staff, which competed with L'Ora on one of its main news subjects.

From the economic point of view the journal was kept alive thanks to the NEM (Nuova Editrice Meridionale), a company formed by the cooperatives in agreement with the Communist Party, which owned the title and the equipment. Despite the fact that the technological upgrading and renovation of the headquarters in Palermo was successful, editorial and managerial problems led to a lack of adequate leadership. Although the paper enjoyed a revival of sales in 1992, this did not prevent the PDS (Partito Democratico della Sinistra - Democratic Party of the Left), the successor of the PCI, to liquidate L'Ora. The last issue was published on May 8, 1992.

On 29 September 2019, the street where the editorial staff of the newspaper used to be located was renamed Via "Giornale L'Ora" on the occasion of the tenth anniversary of the death of Vittorio Nisticò, the historical director of the newspaper. A commemorative plaque was inaugurated to honour the three reporters killed by the Mafia: Mauro De Mauro, Cosimo Cristina and Giovanni Spampinato and the Mafia attack that hit the printing house in 1958.

== See also ==
- List of newspapers in Italy

== Sources ==
- Schneider, Jane T. & Peter T. Schneider (2003). Reversible Destiny: Mafia, Antimafia, and the Struggle for Palermo, Berkeley: University of California Press. ISBN 0-520-23609-2
- Servadio, Gaia (1976), Mafioso. A history of the Mafia from its origins to the present day, London: Secker & Warburg ISBN 0-436-44700-2
