= Mauro De Mauro =

Italian investigative journalist (1921–1970)

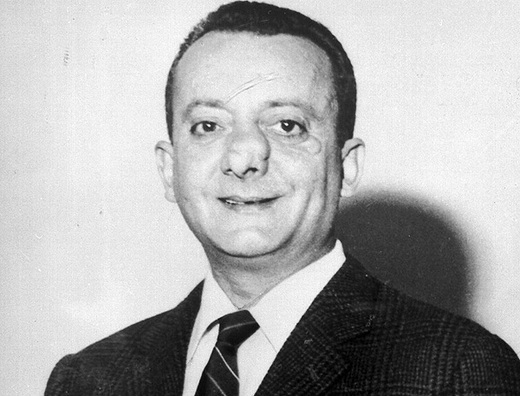
- De Mauro in 1970
- Born: 6 September 1921; Foggia, Italy
- Disappeared: 16 September 1970 (aged 49); Palermo, Italy
- Status: Missing for 56 years and 9 days
- Occupation: Journalist
- Known for: Investigative journalism
- Relatives: Tullio De Mauro (brother)

Mauro De Mauro (Italian pronunciation: [ˈmauro de ˈmauro]; 6 September 1921 – disappeared 16 September 1970) was an Italian investigative journalist. Originally a supporter of Benito Mussolini's Fascist regime, De Mauro eventually became a journalist with the left-leaning newspaper L'Ora in Palermo. He disappeared in September 1970 and his body has never been found. The disappearance and probable death of the "inconvenient journalist" (giornalista scomodo), as he became known as a result of his investigative reporting, remains one of the greatest unsolved mysteries in modern Italian history.

Several explanations for De Mauro's disappearance are current. One is related to the death of Enrico Mattei, the president of Italy's state-owned oil and gas conglomerate Eni. Another is that De Mauro had discovered a drug trafficking network between Sicily and the United States. A third explanation links his disappearance with the Golpe Borghese, a 1970 foiled right-wing coup d'état. De Mauro was apparently convinced that he had got hold of a story of a lifetime and had told colleagues at L'Ora, "I have a scoop that is going to shake Italy."

== Fascist past ==
Mauro De Mauro was born in 1921 in Foggia, Apulia. His father Oscar De Mauro belonged to a reputable family of doctors and pharmacists that had been living in Foggia for several generations. His mother Clementina Rispoli came from Naples and was a math teacher. His younger brother Tullio De Mauro (31 March 1932 – 5 January 2017) was a linguist and politician who became minister of education in 2000–2001.

De Mauro was a supporter of the Italian fascist regime of Benito Mussolini. After the armistice with the Allied Forces in September 1943, he chose to follow the hard-line fascist regime of the Italian Social Republic (Repubblica Sociale Italiana, or RSI) in German-held northern Italy. During the German military occupation of Rome in 1943–1944, he was vice-commander of police under Commander Caruso, informant of Captain Erich Priebke and Colonel Herbert Kappler of the SS. De Mauro was also a member of the Koch Band, a special unit of the Home Security in the RSI. Using a variety of aliases, De Mauro managed to infiltrate several resistance organizations in Rome and Milan in order to hunt the partisans.

De Mauro and his wife Elda volunteered to join the Decima MAS, a brutal anti-partisan force under the command of Prince Junio Valerio Borghese, also known as the "Black Prince". He worked for the journal La Cambusa (The Galley) of the propaganda unit of the military formation. De Mauro was arrested during the liberation in Milan in April 1945. He escaped from the prison camp Coltano (Tuscany) in December 1945 and took refuge in Naples with his young wife, along with his two daughters, Junia and Franca Valeria (the names referred to Junio Valerio Borghese). Accused of having participated in the Fosse Ardeatine massacre in March 1944 in which 335 people were executed, he was absolved by the court in 1948.

== Journalist in Sicily ==
De Mauro at work in 1960

In 1948, De Mauro moved to Palermo, Sicily, under an assumed name, and worked for local newspapers such as Il Tempo di Sicilia and Il Mattino di Sicilia. In 1959 he started working for L'Ora, a communist-oriented paper. Other journalists were puzzled about De Mauro's presence at the newspaper, as he had been a supporter of Mussolini until the bitter end and fought in the brutal war against the anti-Fascist partisans. Rumour had it that his nose had been broken by partisans.

At L'Ora, De Mauro joined a group of crack investigative reporters that included Felice Chilanti and Mario Farinella. From the mid-1950s to the 1970s, the left-leaning newspaper often hit the national spotlight for its investigations and denunciations of ties between corrupt politicians and the Sicilian Mafia. In 1960 De Mauro was among the winners of the Premiolino, one of the most important Italian journalism awards, for his crime investigations. De Mauro also wrote pieces on drug trafficking and on the Sack of Palermo, the construction boom in the 1950s and 1960s that led to the destruction of the city's green belt and ancient villas.

In 1962, De Mauro was the first to publish a detailed map of the Mafia, which was confirmed 22 years later by the Mafia pentito (turncoat) Tommaso Buscetta in his testimony to Judge Giovanni Falcone. In January 1962 he published a series of articles in L'Ora disclosing the testimony of Melchiorre Allegra, a medical doctor and a member of the Mafia from 1916 until his arrest in 1937. Upon being arrested, Allegra disclosed his membership and testified about Mafia activities. It was one of the first testimonies about the Mafia from within, but the document had been neglected until De Mauro republished it.

After these and other revelations, De Mauro became a target for the Mafia. "De Mauro was a walking corpse," said Buscetta. "Cosa Nostra had been forced to 'forgive' the journalist because his death would arouse too much suspicion, but at the first opportunity, he would have to pay for the scoop. The death sentence had only been temporarily suspended."

== Mattei affair ==
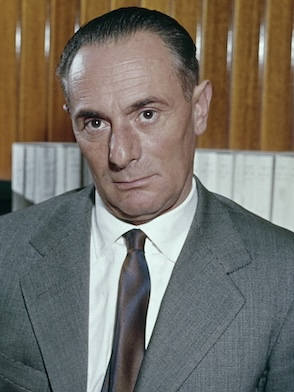
Mattei in the 1950s

In 1962, De Mauro investigated the mysterious death of Enrico Mattei, the powerful president of Italy's state-owned oil and gas conglomerate Eni, who died in suspicious circumstances in a plane crash on 27 October. During his controversial tenure of Eni, Mattei had tried to break the oligopoly of the "Seven Sisters" (a term Mattei coined to refer to the dominant oil companies of the mid-20th century). and in 1959, in the middle of the Cold War, brokered an oil import deal with the Soviet Union over intense protests from the United States and NATO, while supporting independence movements against colonial powers such as Algeria. The U.S. National Security Council described Mattei as an irritation and an obstacle in a classified report from 1958, while the French could not forgive Mattei for his Algeria involvement. Responsibility for his death has been attributed to the Mafia, the CIA, and the French nationalist group the Organisation armée secrète (OAS).

In September 1970, De Mauro was again investigating the case upon request of the movie director Francesco Rosi for the movie Il caso Mattei (The Mattei Affair), which would eventually be released in 1972. He was convinced that Mattei's aircraft had been sabotaged and looked into possible links between the Mafia and the crash. Two days before his disappearance, De Mauro interviewed Graziano Verzotto, a Christian Democrat politician and former right-hand man of Mattei as head of public relations for Eni. Verzotto knew Mafia boss Giuseppe Di Cristina quite well; he had been best man at De Cristina's wedding. Verzotto had been with Mattei on his airplane the day before it crashed. De Mauro was convinced that he had got hold of a story of a lifetime. Before his disappearance, he told colleagues at the newspaper L'Ora, "I have a scoop that is going to shake Italy".

== Disappearance ==
Front page of L'Ora five days after the disappearance of De Mauro begging for help to locate him

De Mauro was kidnapped on the evening of 16 September 1970, while coming back home from work, in the via delle Magnolie in Palermo. In response, thousands of police and Carabinieri, equipped with helicopters and dogs, combed Sicily in vain in search of the reporter. De Mauro's body has never been found, a victim of the so-called lupara bianca, despite intensive search efforts assisted by top-level forces from Rome and even a special investigative committee of the Italian Parliament.

Over the years, the investigations into De Mauro's disappearance by the Carabinieri and the police followed widely divergent leads. Colonel Carlo Alberto Dalla Chiesa and Captain Giuseppe Russo of the Carabinieri were among the first to work on the case. Years later, and in different circumstances, both were murdered by the Mafia. They focused on the lead of drug trafficking. According to them, De Mauro would have been a victim of lupara bianca after discovering leads on drug trafficking by the Mafia between Sicily and the U.S.

The first inquiries of the police by Bruno Contrada and Boris Giuliano instead focused on the lead of De Mauro's investigations into the death of Mattei, prompted by the disappearance a few pages of notes and a tape of Mattei's last speech from De Mauro's office. The investigations were seriously hampered due to deviations by people within the Italian police and secret services. According to police inspector Giuliano, there was "someone at the ministry in Rome that does not want to go to the bottom of the death of De Mauro." According to Giuliano, an order to scale down the investigation was issued by the head of the secret service, Vito Miceli, allegedly involved in the Borghese coup. Miceli had been in contact with the mafiosi Di Cristina and Giuseppe Calderone, who wanted to support the coup, which was scheduled for December 1970.

== Italian mystery ==
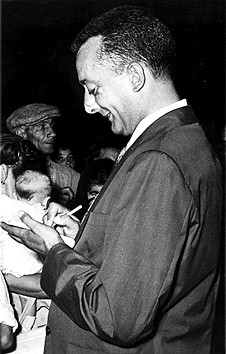
De Mauro on an assignment

The disappearance of De Mauro remained a mystery and the focus of many speculations. In May 1994, Buscetta declared that the Sicilian Mafia had been involved in the murder of Mattei, and that De Mauro had been killed for investigating that murder. According to Buscetta, Mattei was killed at the request of the American Mafia because his oil policies had hurt U.S. interests in the Middle East. The American Mafia in turn was possibly doing a favour to the Seven Sisters. Buscetta claimed that Mattei's death was organized by Mafia bosses Di Cristina, Salvatore Greco "Ciaschiteddu", and Stefano Bontade at the request of Angelo Bruno, a Sicilian-born Mafia boss from Philadelphia. Gaetano Iannì, another pentito, declared that a special agreement had been reached between the Sicilian Mafia and "some foreigners" for the elimination of Mattei, which was organized by Di Cristina. These statements triggered new inquiries, including the exhumation of Mattei's corpse.

Buscetta claimed that Bontade organized De Mauro's kidnapping because his investigations into the death of Mattei came very close to the Mafia, and to Bontade in particular. Another pentito, Francesco Di Carlo, declared in 2001 that De Mauro was killed because he had learned that one of his former fascist friends, Prince Borghese, was involved in the planned 1970 coup with like-minded army officers, determined to stop what they considered as Italy's drift to the left. Yet another pentito, Rosario Naimo, who started to collaborate with the Italian authorities after his arrest in October 2010, said that the journalist was killed because of his investigative reporting that damaged the Mafia. The order for De Mauro's killing came from the heads of the Sicilian Mafia Commission, Bontade, Gaetano Badalamenti and Salvatore Riina, according to Di Carlo and Buscetta. Both Di Carlo and Naimo say that De Mauro was kidnapped by Emanuele D'Agostino, a mafioso from Bontade's Santa Maria di Gesù crime family.

According to Di Carlo, the remains of De Mauro were buried under a bridge over the Oreto River near Palermo. However, the police, after a search, did not find the body. The pentito Francesco Marino Mannoia later claimed that he had been ordered by Bontade in 1977 or 1978 to dig up several bodies at the bridge and dissolve them in acid. According to the new testimony of Naimo, De Mauro was taken to a terrain in Pallavicino neighbourhood in Palermo where the Mafia boss Francesco Madonia owned a chicken farm. He was killed there and dumped in a pit.

== 2006 murder trial ==
In 2001, as a result of the declarations of Di Carlo, the judicial inquiry was reopened. In April 2006, more than 35 years after De Mauro's disappearance, the trial on his murder started at the Court of Palermo with the former Mafia boss of bosses Riina as the only remaining defendant. D'Agostino and Bontate were killed by Riina's Corleonesi in the Second Mafia War; Badalamenti died in a US prison in April 2004. In 2011, the new Mafia turncoat Naimo testified at the trial saying that the journalist was killed by the Mafia on the orders of Riina.

The "inconvenient journalist" (giornalista scomodo), as De Mauro had become known, was kidnapped and killed because the Mafia and their backers wanted to know his sources of confidential and potentially devastating information, public prosecutor Antonio Ingroia told the court in his closing speech in March 2011. Ingroia said: "The death sentence on De Mauro was passed because of a convergence of two elements," Ingroia said. Riina, Bontade, and Badalamenti decided to eliminate De Mauro because he was about to go public about Mattei's 1962 murder as a result of research for Francesco Rosi's landmark movie, as well as the fact the journalist had uncovered the plans for staging the Mafia-backed far-right Borghese coup d'état, thanks to his former wartime Fascist connections.

According to Ingroia, "De Mauro was very busy piecing together the elements of the plot, and his death stopped it being uncovered. The other 'convergent' element in his death was the fact that he knew, from its inception, about the subversive project involving spies, neofascists and Mafia groups [to stage the Borghese Coup]. From his sources in neofascist circles, from his past in Prince Junio Valerio Borghese's crack Decima Mas unit, as well as from tip-offs from Mafia boss Emanuele D'Agostino, he knew something was in the offing."

The "preventive crime" might even have had other motives, such as other events that concerned the "friends in Rome" of the Corleonesi headed by Riina, as emerged from documents retrieved from the former mayor of Palermo, Vito Ciancimino. Cosa Nostra was behind the murder of De Mauro, but there were other backgrounds and individuals, allied with the Mafia, such as deviated freemasons and corrupt public officials. According to Ingroia, "De Mauro was not killed out of revenge, but to prevent harm to the Mafia. The Mafia did not just execute instructions of others, but also because his investigations affected Cosa Nostra itself and other powers associated with it." He said the investigations for the trial had unearthed an "institutional cover-up" in the initial probe into De Mauro's disappearance.

== Mystery continues ==
On 10 June 2011, Riina was acquitted of charges of ordering the kidnap and killing of De Mauro by the Court in Palermo because of insufficient evidence. His daughter, Franca De Mauro, commented: "It's certainly a surprise, but we'll see the reasons for this ruling. I am very upset because after 40 years we still have no answer about what happened that day." In their explanation of the ruling that became public in August 2012, the judges of the Court of Palermo decided that De Mauro had died because he had gone too far in his quest for the truth about the last hours of Mattei in Sicily. They pointed to Graziano Verzotto as a possible man behind the killing of De Mauro and Mattei but without a clear conviction. Verzotto had died in June 2010.

The prosecution, which had requested a further life term for Riina, appealed the acquittal. The appeal trial began in April 2013. On 27 January 2014, the Palermo Appeal Court confirmed the acquittal of Riina. The court was convinced of the involvement of Cosa Nostra in De Mauro's murder but attributed the murder to the group that was headed by Stefano Bontade and identified the likely motive in the discovery by the journalist of important facts about the death of Eni president Enrico Mattei. There was insufficient evidence for the involvement of Riina, due to contradictory evidence, lack of clarity of the evidence gathered and conflicting statements by government witnesses, in particular those of Di Carlo.

In June 2015, Riina was absolved by the court of last instance, the supreme Court of Cassation. The evidence collected by the prosecution did not allow to establish a direct or indirect role of the accused in the crime. The Court concluded that De Mauro most likely had been killed by the Mafia because he knew of their involvement in Enrico Mattei's death rather than the Borghese coup attempt. De Mauro's disappearance and likely death remains one of the unsolved mysteries in Italian history. The Sicilian writer Leonardo Sciascia once summarized the puzzle of De Mauro's death saying: "He said the right thing to the wrong man and the wrong thing to the right man."

== See also ==
- List of journalists killed in Europe
- List of people who disappeared mysteriously: 1910–1990
- List of unsolved murders (1900–1979)
- List of victims of the Sicilian Mafia
