= Mazzarino =

Mazzarino may refer to:

- Mazzarino, Sicily, a city and commune in Sicily, Italy
- Mazzarino Friars, a criminal group of Capuchin friars active in Mazzarino in the 1950s and 60s
- Joey Mazzarino (born 1968), American puppeteer and actor
- Giulio Raimondo Mazzarino (1602–1661), Italian cardinal
- Michele Mazzarino (1605–1648), Italian cardinal
- Nicolás Mazzarino (born 1975), Uruguayan basketball player
- Santo Mazzarino (1916–1987), Italian historian
