= Guido Piovene =

Italian writer and journalist (1907–1974)

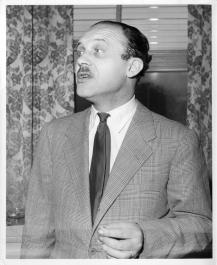
- Piovene in 1951
- Born: 27 July 1907; Vicenza, Italy
- Died: 12 November 1974 (aged 67); London, England
- Occupation: Writer

Guido Piovene (27 July 1907 – 12 November 1974) was an Italian writer and journalist.

== Biography ==
Born in Vicenza into a noble family, Piovene graduated in philosophy in Milan and then devoted himself to journalism, notably collaborating with Corriere della Sera, La Stampa and Il Tempo. He took part in the anti-fascist resistance with the Movimento Comunista d'Italia. According to Felice Chilanti's daughter, he wrote the statutes for its youth association COBA (so named in homage to Joseph Stalin's youthful pseudonym).

His 1970 novel Le stelle fredde (The Cold Stars) won the Strega Prize. In 1974 he co-founded the newspaper Il Giornale with Indro Montanelli.
