= Spampinato =

Spampinato is an Italian surname that may refer to

- Giovanni Spampinato (1946–1972), Italian investigative journalist
- Joey Spampinato (born 1948), American rock musician
  - The Spampinato Brothers, a rock band from Cape Cod, Massachusetts, U.S.
- Stefania Spampinato (born 1982), Italian actress
- Vincenzo Spampinato (born 1953), Italian pop-rock singer-songwriter, composer and lyricist
