= Sack of Palermo =

Architectural degradation of Palermo, Italy

The sack of Palermo is the popular term for the construction boom from the 1950s through the mid-1980s in Palermo, Italy, that led to the destruction of the city's green belt and historic villas to make way for characterless and shoddily constructed apartment blocks. In the meantime, Palermo's historic centre, severely damaged by Allied bombing raids in 1943, was allowed to decay. The bombing condemned nearly 150,000 people to live in crowded slums, shantytowns, and even caves.

== Background ==
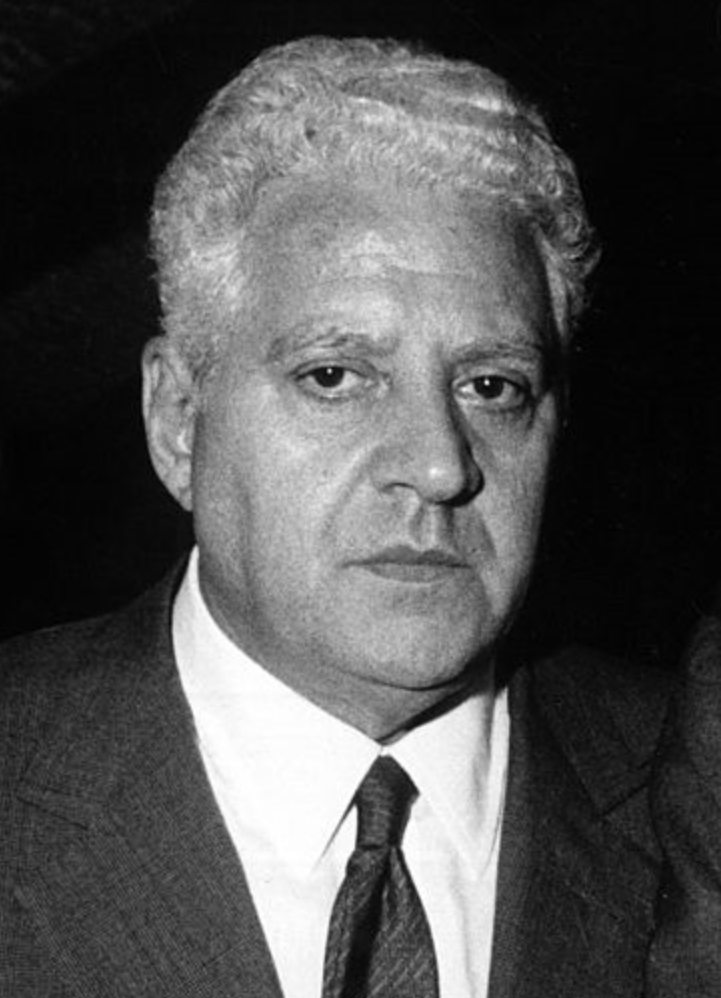
Salvo Lima

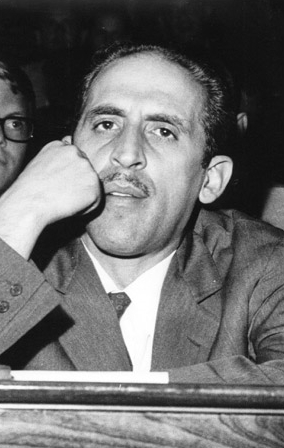
Vito Ciancimino

Between 1951 and 1961, the population of Palermo had risen by 100,000, caused by a rapid urbanization of Sicily after World War II as land reform and mechanization of agriculture created a massive peasant exodus and rural landlords moved their investment into urban real estate. This led to an unregulated and undercapitalised construction boom from the 1950s through the mid-1980s that was characterised by the aggressive involvement of the Sicilian Mafia in real estate speculation and construction. The years 1957 to 1963 were the high point in private construction, followed in the 1970s and 1980s by a greater emphasis on public works. The population of Palermo grew from 503,000 in 1951 to 709,000 in 1981, an increase of 41 percent.

More significant than the wartime destruction of the old city was the political decision against its restoration in favor of building a “new Palermo”, at first concentrated at the northern end, beyond the Art Nouveau neighborhood of 19th-century expansion. Subsequently, in other zones to the west and the south spreading over, and destroying, the Conca d'Oro orchards, villas, and hamlets, accelerating the cementification of what had been green.

Real estate developers ran wild, pushing the center of the city out along Viale della Liberta toward the new Punta Raisi Airport. With hastily drafted zoning variances or in wanton violation of the law, builders tore down countless Art Nouveau palaces and asphalted many of the city's parks, transforming one of the most beautiful cities in Europe into a dense, unappealing landscape of cement condominia. Villa Deliella, one of the most important works of Sicilian architect Ernesto Basile was completely demolished in the middle of the night, hours before it would have come under the protection of historic preservation laws.

== Mafia involvement ==
The high point of the sack happened when the Christian Democrat Salvo Lima was mayor of Palermo (1958–1963 and 1965–1968) and Vito Ciancimino the assessor for public works. They supported Mafia-allied building contractors such as Palermo's leading construction entrepreneur Francesco Vassallo – a former cart driver hauling sand and stone in a poor district of Palermo. Vassallo was connected to mafiosi like Angelo La Barbera and Tommaso Buscetta. In five years, over 4,000 building licences were signed, some 2,500 in the names of three pensioners who had no connection with construction at all.

In June 1961, the local Palermo newspaper L'Ora published a groundbreaking three-part investigative reports on what they labelled the "sacco di Palermo", about the profitable real-estate fraud taking place in the city during the early 1960s. Since those reports, this devastation of parts of Palermo has been known by that name: the Sack of Palermo. At that time, the role of the Mafia in property speculation was not yet clear, but in later reports in 1963 and 1964 the newspaper identified the so-called VA.LI.GIO business consortium (from Vassallo-Gioia-Lima), consisting of the builder Vassallo and the two Christian Democratic leaders, Giovanni Gioia and Lima, together with the DC councillor for public works, Vito Ciancimino, as those responsible for destroying the layout of Palermo.

Developers with close ties to the Mafia were not afraid to use strong-arm tactics to intimidate owners into selling or to clear the way for their projects. The Parliamentary Antimafia Commission noted:

It was in Palermo in particular that the phenomenon [of illegal construction] took on dimensions such as not to leave any doubts about the insidious penetration by the Mafia of public administration. The administrative management of Palermo City Council reached unprecedented heights of deliberate non-observation of the law around 1960.
