= Giovanni Gioia =

Italian politician (1925–1981)

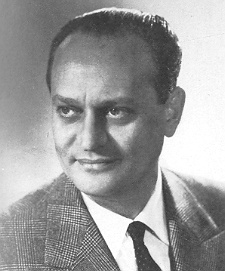

Minister of Merchant Navy
- In office 23 November 1974 – 28 July 1976
- Prime Minister: Aldo Moro
- Preceded by: Dionigi Coppo
- Succeeded by: Attilio Ruffini

Minister for Parliamentary Relations
- In office 6 July 1973 – 22 November 1974
- Prime Minister: Mariano Rumor
- Preceded by: Giorgio Bergamasco
- Succeeded by: Adolfo Sarti

Minister of Post and Telecommunications
- In office 26 June 1972 – 5 July 1973
- Prime Minister: Giulio Andreotti
- Preceded by: Giacinto Bosco
- Succeeded by: Giuseppe Togni

Member of the Chamber of Deputies
- In office 12 June 1958 – 27 November 1981

Personal details
- Born: January 16, 1925 Palermo, Sicily, Italy
- Died: November 27, 1981 (aged 56) Palermo, Sicily, Italy
- Party: Christian Democracy

Giovanni Gioia (16 January 1925 – 27 November 1981) was an Italian politician.

== Biography ==
Giovanni Gioia was grandson of the industrialist Filippo Pecoraino and had kinship relationships with Tagliavia shipowners.

Gioia was one of the most influential members of Amintore Fanfani's political faction within Christian Democracy in the 1950s and 1960s. In 1954 Gioia was appointed provincial secretary of the Christian Democracy of Palermo and also head of the Party Organization Office, which supervised the membership cards: Gioia inaugurated the so-called "card strategy", which consisted in the distribution of membership cards to relatives, friends and even to the dead, arriving to open 59 Christian Democratic sections only in Palermo. Around the years 1954-1957 the breakdown of the agrarian bloc allowed Gioia to transfer liberal and monarchist exponents (often compromised with the mafia) to the Christian Democrats.

The two main lieutenants of Gioia, Salvo Lima and Vito Ciancimino, managed to reach the top of the municipal administration of Palermo: during the period of the city council of the mayor Lima and the assessor for public works Ciancimino (1958-1964), 1,600 of 4,000 building permits appeared in the name of three figureheads, who had nothing to do with building, inaugurating the season of the so-called "Sack of Palermo". During this period, the builder Francesco Vassallo (son-in-law of Giuseppe Messina, head of the Tommaso Natale village and one of the protagonists of the Sack of Palermo) managed to obtain numerous loans issued without guarantee by the Cassa di Risparmio, chaired by Gaspare Cusenza, father-in-law of Gioia; according to their relationships, the families of Gioia and Cusenza went to live in the numerous apartments built by Vassallo.

In 1958 Gioia was elected to the Chamber of Deputies, being re-elected for five other terms.

In 1966 he was appointed Undersecretary for Finance in the third Moro government and re-confirmed in the second Leone government, in office from 24 June 1968 to 12 December 1968. Giovanni Gioia was also national deputy secretary of the Christian Democracy from 22 January 1969 to November 22, 1969.

Subsequently he served as Minister of Post and Telecommunications in the second Andreotti government (1972–73), as Minister for Parliamentary Relations in the fourth and fifth Rumor governments (1973–74) and as Minister of Merchant Navy in the fourth and fifth Moro governments (1974–76).

== Controversies ==
=== Pasquale Almerico case ===
In 1957 Pasquale Almerico, secretary of the Christian Democratic section of Camporeale, denied the membership card to Vanni Sacco, head of the local mafia gang. Almerico decided to inform with a memorial the secretary of the Sicilian DC, Nino Gullotti, and Giovanni Gioia, in his role as provincial secretary of the DC and head of the Organization Office, but received no response: on March 25, 1957 Almerico was barbarously murdered in Camporeale. Gioia welcomed the mobster of Camporeale into the ranks of the DC and replied to the accusations of abandoning Almerico to his fate of violent death saying that "The party needs people to join forces, needs new men, some cannot be impeded compromise attempts".

In 1958 the Palermo newspaper L'Ora denounced the responsibilities of Gioia and the leaders of the local DC for the murder of Pasquale Almerico. So Gioia immediately sued the newspaper. Subsequently the complaint was withdrawn after the publication of a denial agreed between the complainant and the journalists involved.

=== The investigation of the Parliamentary Anti-Mafia Commission ===
In the early 70s, Gioia was investigated by the Parliamentary Anti-Mafia Commission for his links with the builder Vassallo (The Court of Palermo has excluded that Vassallo had links with the mafia, a decision confirmed by the Court of Appeal of Potenza with a decree of May 24, 1974) and with mafia members. Finally in 1976 the minority report of the Anti-Mafia Parliamentary Commission, also drafted by the deputies Pio La Torre and Cesare Terranova, severely accused Gioia and his lieutenants Vito Ciancimino and Salvo Lima of having relations with the mafia.

=== The ISAB Case of Melilli ===
Regarding the establishment of the ISAB company in Melilli, the name of Giovanni Gioia was included in a significant list of bribes distributed as stated in various newspaper articles. In reference to Gioia, the newspapers spoke of ₤65 million in bribes. The list "extra undocumented expenses" relating to the ISAB Refinery in Melilli was found by the Guardia di Finanza of Genoa in the home of Giampiero Mondini, brother-in-law of the oil tanker Riccardo Garrone and managing director of Garrone Petroli SpA.
