= Premiolino =

- Awarded for: Excellence in journalism and communication
- Country: Italy
- Presented by: Premiolino
- First award: 1960
- Website: http://www.premiolino.it/

The Premiolino is the oldest and one of the most important Italian journalism awards. It is made annually to six journalists from print media and television for their career achievements and their contributions to the freedom of the press.

== History ==
The prize was founded in Milan in 1960 by a group of special correspondents including Gaetano Tumiati, Orio Vergani, Paolo Monelli, Luigi Barzini, Jr., Indro Montanelli, Enrico Emanuelle, and Enzo Biagi, the jury chairman. The first year the prize was sponsored by Reader's Digest, but replaced the following year by Bassetti.

In 1961, the prize took its present name, which involves a play on words. ‘Premiolino’ can be translated as little prize (or ‘prizelet’), the diminutive suffix ‘lino’ intended to convey the award’s unpretentious nature; but ‘lino’ also means ‘linen’ and refers to the sponsor’s household linen range. The value of the prize was 200,000 lire, a remarkable sum when the prize was founded, but one which remained unchanged for nearly two decades despite inflation. Initially, the prize was awarded to the "Journalist of the Month" and was delivered every three months.

Bassetti remained the sponsor for 23 years, before being replaced by Parmalat in the 1980s, which established the "Journalist of the Year" and "Best Journalist of Europe" awards. Since 2007, the prize sponsor has been Birra Moretti.

== Awards ==
Eleven awards were made in 1960, the first year of the Premiolino. The winners were Achille Patitucci (Corriere della Sera), Arturo Carlo Jemolo (La Stampa), Vittorio Notarnicola (Corriere d'Informazione), Felice Chilanti (Paese Sera), Eugenio Ferdinando Palmieri (La Notte), Giuseppe Signori (Il Campione), Sennuccio Benelli (Tempo settimanale), Mauro De Mauro (Settimo Giorno), Enzo Forcella (Il Giorno), Gianni Granzotto (Rai tv) and Aldo Chiappelli (L'Espresso)

Over the following half century the Premiolino has been awarded both to nationally celebrated journalists and writers, and to those less known who work on local newspapers. Among the most celebrated recipients of the prize have been Sergio Zavoli, Giorgio Bocca, Camilla Cederna, Oriana Fallaci, Alberto Moravia, Pier Paolo Pasolini, Alberto Ronchey and Roberto Saviano.

In 2009 awards were made under five categories. Roberto Saviano of L'Espresso received the award for journalists working on weeklies, Massimo Bordin (Radio Radicale) for radio, Emilio Carelli (Sky Tg 24) for television, Gianni Dragoni (Il Sole 24 Ore) and Simonetta Fiori (La Repubblica) for the dailies, and the Italian Wikipedia under the new media category.
