= Movimento Comunista d'Italia =

Italian revolutionary partisan brigade

The Movimento Comunista d'Italia (MCd'I), best-known after its newspaper Bandiera Rossa, was a revolutionary partisan brigade, and the largest single formation of the 1943-44 Italian Resistance in Rome.

== History ==
Growing out of communist underground circles like Scintilla that sought to recreate the Communist Party of Italy crushed in 1926, the MCd'I would clash with other anti-fascist forces, including Palmiro Togliatti's Moscow-backed Partito Comunista Italiano, over the correct attitude to take to the partisan struggle.

The MCd'I, which suffered some 186 deaths among its close to three-thousand members under Wehrmacht occupation, advocated 'turning the war between nations into a war between classes' in 'the struggle to create a Soviet republic on Italian soil', but it would be banned by the Western Allies soon after Liberation.. Its leaders included lifelong communist militant Tigrino Sabatini (executed 3 May 1944), Raffaele de Luca, Antonino Poce, Felice Chilanti and Guido Piovene.
