= Mazzarino Friars =

Group of Italian friar criminals that sparked controversy in the late 50's

The Mazzarino Friars were a group of Capuchin friars who turned to crime. They were active around the town of Mazzarino, Italy, in the 1950s. Their trial was a much-debated issue in the early '60s in Italy, in the context of the historical struggle between clerical and anti-clerical political forces prominent at that time.

The whole story was pieced together in 1989 by journalist Giorgio Frasca Polara in his book La Terribile Istoria dei Frati di Mazzarino (The Terrible History of the Mazzarino Friars), published by Sellerio.

== Criminal history ==
=== The friars ===
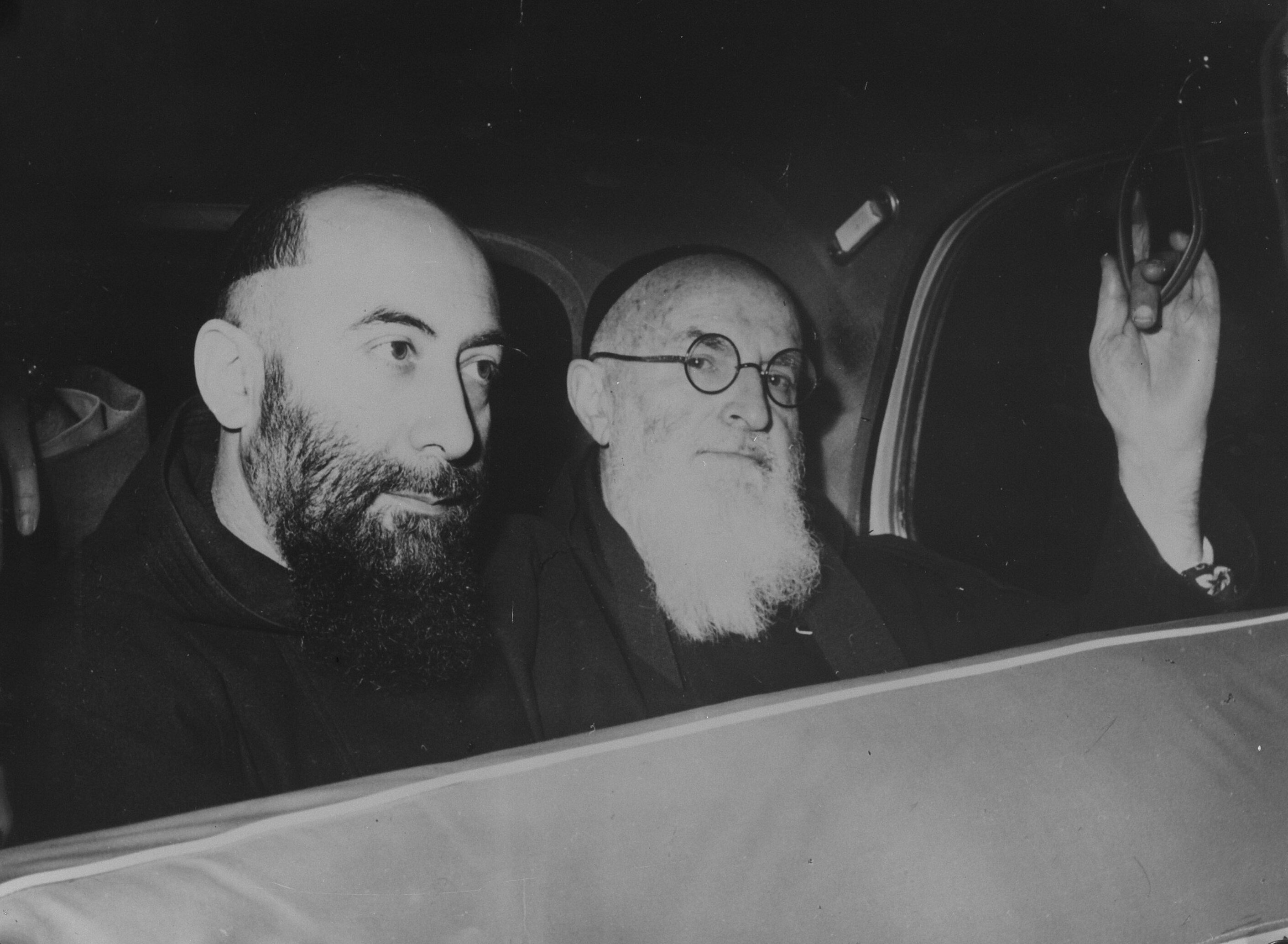
Vittorio (l.) and Carmelo (r.) on March 13, 1962

In April 1956, the provincial Father of the order came to Mazzarino for a visit, after hearing rumors about an extortion business managed by four friars. These four Capuchin friars were Venanzio, Carmelo, Agrippino and Vittorio. (Agrippino had earlier apparently been coerced into joining the gang after shotgun fire nearly hit him. He was told that they "would aim better next time" by monastery gardener Carmelo Lo Bartolo.) After arriving at the friary, the superior spoke with two suspects, who told him that his life was in great danger and that he could save himself only by dropping the inquiry and paying 600.000 lire to someone they knew. The scared superior paid the large sum, but was later blackmailed again by the Friars, acting like humble and frightened emissaries of a powerful crime covenant.

=== Extortion and murders ===
After their success with the provincial prior, Father Enrico, the gang turned its attention to more wealthy villagers. The Friars demanded money from the local pharmacist, Ernesto Colajanni. He refused firmly, and a few days later the oak door of his house was set on fire. Colajanni spoke to the friary prior, Father Venanzio, noting that he had a very profound knowledge of his earnings and wealth. Venanzio agreed to intercede with the blackmailers, and came back to Colajanni two days later with bad news: the criminals were now asking for at least 2 million lire (as a comparison, the sale price of a brand-new Fiat 1400 sedan in 1950 was 1.275.000 lire). Colajanni, unable to afford such a sum, asked Father Venanzio to haggle, and ultimately agreed to pay half a million.

One year later, the Friars tried again to get money from a local landowner, Angelo Cannata. After he refused to pay, they met him one evening while he was returning from work. They stopped his car, which had him, his wife, son and chauffeur inside it, threatened him with a gun, shot his legs and fled. The man died minutes later from blood loss.

After a few days, Father Carmelo met with Cannata's wife and relatives, asking for more money to have the mysterious crime group spare their lives. The relatives, not understanding the role of the Friars in the murder, politely declined and told Father Carmelo that they had faith in Divine Providence. Angered, the friar left the house allegedly crying "che Provvidenza e Provvidenza! Ci avimu a pinzari nuantri, no Diu! ("What Providence and Providence, [to solve this problem] we can only rely on ourselves, not God!"). The Cannata family paid the required ransom.

=== Arrest ===
On May 5, 1959, a further extortion went awry when the victim refused to pay and was gunned down by the Friars. The victim, city guard Giovanni Stuppia, got severe wounds to his legs and passed out, but managed to wake up and go to the Mazzarino Carabinieri station. He told them about the extortion, the names of the four friars intended to receive the money and identified the four killers: Carmelo Lo Bartolo, Girolamo Azzolina, Giuseppe Salemi and Filippo Nicoletti. Two friars and three laypeople were arrested the same evening, while Lo Bartolo succeeded in escaping capture. Father Agrippino and Father Venanzio turned themselves in one month later. Lo Bartolo was later found in Ventimiglia, trying to buy a house with 20 million lire, allegedly acquired from extortion.

The Caltanissetta public prosecutor began an extensive investigation that ultimately led to the indictment of the four friars, along with four laypeople, on February 16, 1960. Among them was Carmelo Lo Bartolo, the market gardener of the friary, who was deemed to be the head of the killer commando.

== Controversy ==
The trial was a very divisive issue in Italian society in the late '50s and early '60s. Although the public prosecutor quickly managed to gather much unquestionable evidence and accounts about the role of the friars, clerical supporters (mostly linked to the Democrazia Cristiana Church and other Catholic institutions), led by the Palermo Archbishop Ernesto Ruffini, promptly stated that the friars were innocent victims of a trap by anti-Catholic forces. The Catholic newspaper Avvenire was the main means of propaganda for those stating the innocence of the friars.

Lo Bartolo was deemed by the Catholic press to be a communist and was accused of being violent and the leader of the group. He was found dead in jail on the day before he was supposed to testify, with his death declared a suicide by hanging. The suicide looked suspicious, as his body was hanged with a bed sheet to a nail in the wall placed only about one meter from the ground, but no formal inquiry was conducted. Allegations were brought forth by Catholic supporters claiming that he was the mastermind of a plan by the communists to discredit the friars, who were not only called "victims", but even "saints".

== Inquiry and trial ==
=== Defense ===
Francesco Carnelutti, a very prominent Italian attorney and jurist of the 20th century, was called to defend the Capuchins. Despite being very close to the Church, and risking a breach with the other Catholic forces in the country by this action, Carnelutti advised the friars to acknowledge their role, but stated that they could not act in any other way since they were under threat from the Sicilian Mafia themselves.

As part of the defense, Carnelutti stated that one of the friars, Father Agrippino, risked being killed when he decided not to collaborate, and showed some holes in the wall of his cell, allegedly marks of bullets from a lupara shotgun. When asked about their cooperation with the alleged Mafia crime ring, Carnelutti publicly told the friars "If you will ever find yourself in that kind of trouble another time, do the same error again".

=== Involvement of Cosimo Cristina ===
Cosimo Cristina, a Sicilian journalist, wrote an article for the Prospettive Siciliane, affirming he had proof that a notable attorney and journalist from Mazzarino was behind the criminal covenant, along with the friars. The name of this attorney was not explicitly stated, but only three people matched the profile. Attorney Alfonso Russo Cigna, a correspondent for Giornale di Sicilia, sued Cristina for defamation and won in an unusually short trial promptly instructed and lasting only 20 days. Cristina was sentenced to one year and four months of suspended sentence, along with a 2 million lire fine. Two months later, while waiting for the appeal where he would have presented his evidence, he was killed in a fake suicide in Termini Imerese, his body apparently trampled by a train. The suicide was shown to be a murder by other journalists six years later.

=== First sentence ===
Ultimately, on June 22, 1962, the four laypeople were found guilty of extortion and manslaughter, with Azzolina and Salemmi receiving sentences of up to 30 years and Nicoletti receiving 14 years. Lo Bartolo was dead at the time, but his role was acknowledged. The friars were discharged because of Carnelutti's defense. The sentence was well received by the high-ups of the Catholic hierarchy, but many jurists and citizens were outraged.

Giovanni Leone, a preeminent jurist and then Speaker of the lower house of the Italian Parliament, decided to speak out against the sentence, while also wanting to avoid hurting his relations with his peers at the Democrazia Cristiana. In a letter to the magazine Epoca, he attacked the "state of necessity" exception brought by the court, and wrote that any gentleman, whatever his dress, knows how not to get involved with the Mafia.

=== Sentence revisions ===
On July 6, 1963, the Appeal Court of Perugia revised the sentence, finding three of the four friars guilty of extortion, manslaughter, violence and simulation of a crime, sentencing each to 13 years. Father Vittorio was discharged again. The typewriter used in the ransom letters was proven to be Vittorio's, but he proved that he usually left it unattended outside his room.

On February 10, 1965, the Corte di Cassazione found procedural faults in the proceedings and restarted the trial. The new trial ended with sentences of 8 years for Father Venanzio and Agrippino, 14 years for Nicoletti, 17 years for Salemi and 24 years for Azzolina. Father Carmelo, over 80 years old, had died a few months earlier, on December 12, 1964. The sentence was confirmed on September 30, 1967.

The friars were set free because of remissions and good behavior on July 5, 1969. Being compromised, Agrippino left for Peru, while Venanzio came back to Mazzarino in bad health, dying on February 11, 1970.
