= Salvatore Lima =

Italian politician (1928–1992)

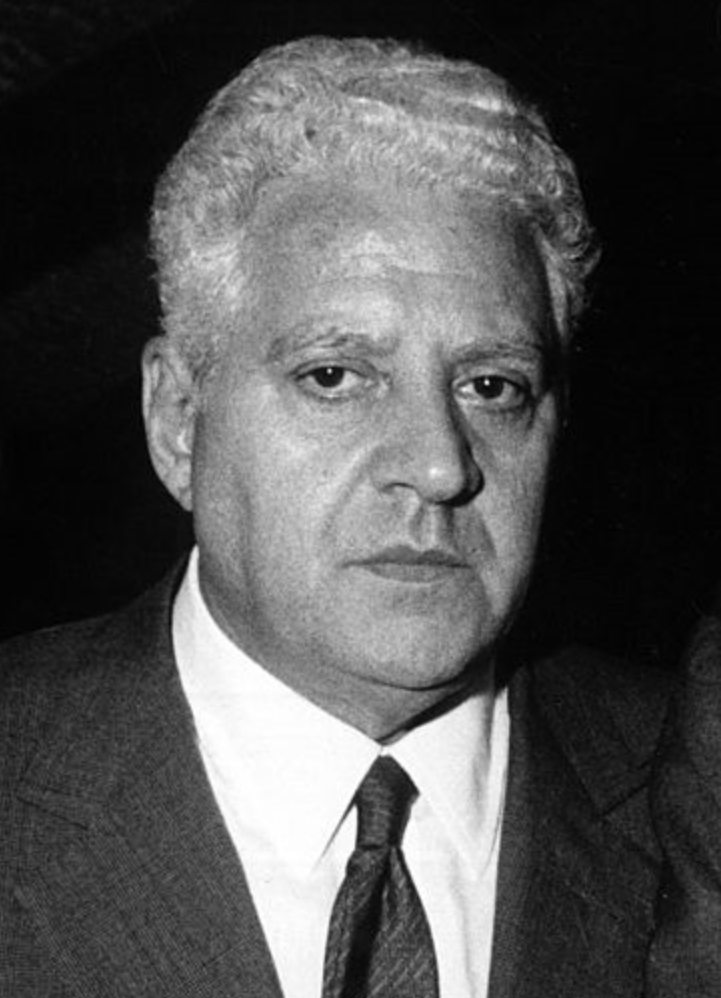

Member of the European Parliament
- In office 17 July 1979 – 12 March 1992
- Constituency: Italian Islands

Member of the Chamber of Deputies
- In office 5 June 1968 – 17 July 1979
- Constituency: Palermo

Mayor of Palermo
- In office 27 January 1965 – 9 July 1966
- Preceded by: Paolo Bevilacqua
- Succeeded by: Paolo Bevilacqua
- In office 7 June 1958 – 23 January 1963
- Preceded by: Luciano Maugeri
- Succeeded by: Francesco Saverio Diliberto

Personal details
- Born: Salvatore Achille Ettore Lima; 23 January 1928 Palermo, Sicily, Kingdom of Italy
- Died: 12 March 1992 (aged 64) Palermo, Sicily, Italy
- Cause of death: Assassination
- Party: Christian Democracy
- Education: University of Palermo
- Profession: Lawyer
- Nickname: Salvo

Salvatore Achille Ettore "Salvo" Lima (Italian: [salvaˈtoːre ˈliːma]; 23 January 1928 – 12 March 1992) was an Italian politician from Sicily who was associated with, and murdered by, the Sicilian Mafia (Cosa Nostra). According to the pentito (Mafia defector) Tommaso Buscetta, Lima's father Vincenzo was a member of the Mafia, but it is not known whether Lima himself was a made member of Cosa Nostra. In the final report of the first Antimafia Commission (1963–1976), Lima was described as one of the pillars of Mafia power in Palermo.

During his long career with Christian Democracy (DC) that began in the 1950s, Lima was first allied with the faction of Amintore Fanfani and after 1964 with the one of Giulio Andreotti, a seven-time prime minister and member of almost every post-war Italian government until the 1980s. That shift earned him a seat in the national parliament in 1968. Lima was often referred to as Andreotti's "proconsul" on Sicily. Under Andreotti, Lima once held a cabinet post. At the time of his death, he was a member of the European Parliament. Lima rarely spoke in public or campaigned during elections but usually managed to gain large support from seemingly nowhere when it came to voting day. He was assassinated in 1992 by the Sicilian Mafia.

== Early life and mayor of Palermo ==
Lima was born in Palermo on 23 January 1928, the son of Vincenzo Lima, an archivist from the municipality of Palermo. In the early 1950s, after obtaining a degree in Law from the University of Palermo, he found a job at the Banco di Sicilia. Following the 1956 Italian local election, Lima was elected municipal councilor of the municipality of Palermo and became a supporter of the Christian Democracy deputy and minister Giovanni Gioia several times, adhering to Amintore Fanfani's party current and becoming councilor with delegation to public works within the municipal council led by the new Palermo mayor Luciano Maugeri. From 1958 to 1963, Lima was mayor of Palermo, his birthplace, while his fellow Christian Democrat Vito Ciancimino was assessor for public works.

Between 1951 and 1961, the population of Palermo had risen by 100,000. Under Lima and Ciancimino an unprecedented construction boom hit the city. They supported Mafia-allied building contractors such as Palermo’s leading construction entrepreneur Francesco Vassallo – a former cart driver hauling sand and stone in a poor district of Palermo. Vassallo was connected to mafiosi like Angelo La Barbera and Tommaso Buscetta. In five years, over 4,000 building licences were signed, more than half of them in the names of three pensioners who had no connection with construction at all. This period was later referred to as the "Sack of Palermo" because the construction boom led to the destruction of the city's green belt, and villas that gave it architectural grace, to make way for characterless and shoddily constructed apartment blocks. In the meantime, Palermo's historical centre was allowed to crumble. During an investigation in 1964, Lima had to admit that he knew La Barbera, one of Palermo's most powerful mobsters. Lima's election was supported by the La Barbera clan. From 1965 to 1968, Lima was again mayor of Palermo.

== Early Mafia connections ==
As mayor of Palermo, Lima arranged an unusually lucrative concession to collect taxes in Sicily to Antonio Salvo and Ignazio Salvo, two wealthy Mafia cousins from the town of Salemi in the province of Trapani, in exchange for their loyalty to Lima and the Andreotti faction of Christian Democracy. The Salvos were allowed 10 percent of the take – three times as much as the national average of 3.3 percent. According to the Mafia defector Tommaso Buscetta, Lima's father was a man of honour of the Palermo Centro Mafia family that was led by Angelo and Salvatore La Barbera, of which Buscetta's family (the Porta Nuova Mafia family) was also part. The La Barbera brothers helped Lima in getting elected. Buscetta himself met Lima many times and they became good friends. Every year, Lima provided Buscetta with tickets for the Teatro Massimo in Palermo.

At the time, the public and authorities did not know these connections. Buscetta only revealed facts about the relations between mafiosi and politicians after judge Giovanni Falcone was killed in 1992. Already in 1964, one of Falcone's predecessors, judge Cesare Terranova, unequivocally demonstrated Lima's connections with the La Barberas. In an indictment in 1964, Terranova wrote that "it is clear that Angelo and Salvatore La Barbera (well-known bosses in the Palermo area) ... knew former mayor Salvatore Lima and maintained relations in such a way as to ask for favours ... The undeniable contacts of the La Barbera mafiosi with the one who was the first citizen of Palermo ... constitute a confirmation of ... the infiltration of the Mafia in several sectors of public life." Nevertheless, Lima was allowed to continue in politics as if nothing had happened.

== Alliance with Andreotti ==
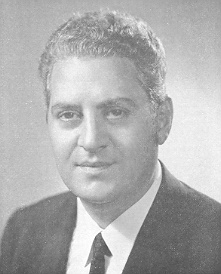
Lima as member of the Chamber of Deputies

In 1968, Lima was elected to the Italian Chamber of Deputies, suddenly surpassing established politicians in Sicily. The alliance between Lima and Andreotti proved beneficial to both. Although Andreotti had a strong electoral base in and around Rome, his faction had no power base in the rest of Italy. With Lima, who at some time was in control of 25 percent of all party members in Sicily, the Andreotti faction turned into a truly national group. While Andreotti had been an important government minister before his alliance with Lima, he now became one of the most powerful politicians in Italy. Andreotti became prime minister for the first time in 1972. In 1974, Lima became Under-Secretary of the Budget. In 1979, Lima was elected in the European Parliament.

In 1981, Palermo witnessed the outbreak of a bloody Mafia war. A new dominant group within the Mafia, headed by Salvatore Riina of Corleone, killed and replaced the traditional bosses of Palermo and their associates. The Corleonesi also turned against state representatives and politicians, such as the communist senator Pio La Torre, the Carabinieri general Carlo Alberto Dalla Chiesa who had been appointed as the prefect of Palermo to fight the Mafia, and Rocco Chinnici, chief prosecutor in Palermo. A mounting public outcry demanded the Christian Democrats to clean up its house in Sicily. The mayor of Palermo, one of Lima's protégés, was forced to resign, and Andreotti's Sicilian faction was on the defensive. At the Maxi Trial against the Mafia in the mid 1980s, two of Lima's closest allies, the cousins Nino and Ignazio Salvo, were convicted as members of the Mafia.

When in Sicily, Lima was allowed to use the bulletproof car of the Salvo's. Lima himself was never part of a criminal investigation because of the unwillingness of both witnesses and prosecutors. Mafia boss Tommaso Buscetta, whose testimonies as a collaborating witness during the Maxi Trial had been instrumental in convicting many Mafia bosses, refused to talk about the relationship between Cosa Nostra and politicians. He told Giovanni Falcone, one of the prosecutors at the Maxi Trial: "I have told you repeatedly that I would not discuss it until and if the time is ripe. It would be extremely foolish to discuss this subject – which is the crucial knot of the Mafia problem – while the very people whom we would be discussing remain fully active on the political scene." Italy's Supreme Court of Cassation, which is the court of final appeal, (Note: According to the Italian law, which has three degrees of judgment and follows the "presumption of innocence" principle, a defendant is "not guilty" until the sentence "becomes final". A defendant has the right to all three levels of judgment (Court, Court of Appeal, and Supreme Court of Cassation) and to advance, in any level, a request for a constitutional complaint. They also have the right to go to supranational courts, such as the Court of Justice of the European Union and the European Court of Human Rights, to stand up for their reasons. See "Presunzione di non colpevolezza". Treccani (in Italian). 2013.) ruled in October 2004 that Andreotti had "friendly and even direct ties" with the Mafia, particularly top men in the moderate wing of Cosa Nostra, such as Stefano Bontade and Gaetano Badalamenti, and that this was favoured by the connection between them and Lima.

== Death ==
The body of Lima after his murder

On 12 March 1992, 64-year-old Lima was on his way to Palermo in his chauffeur-driven car when his tires were shot by a hitman on a motorcycle. After his car screeched to a halt, Lima scrambled out and attempted to flee but the hitman got off the motorbike, shot Lima in the back, and then ran over and finished him off with a bullet to the neck. The hitman then sped away. The killing took place three weeks before Italy's national election, billed as a watershed in Italian politics. The murder of Lima meant a turning point in the relations between the Mafia and its reference points in politics. The Mafia felt betrayed by Lima and Andreotti. In their opinion they had failed to block the confirmation of the sentence of the Maxi Trial by the Supreme Court of Cassation in January 1992, which upheld the Buscetta theorem that Cosa Nostra was a single hierarchical organisation ruled by the Sicilian Mafia Commission and that its leaders could be held responsible for criminal acts that were committed to benefit the organisation. In September 1992, the Mafia murdered Ignazio Salvo, the prominent Mafia businessman who had been close to Lima.

The Mafia had counted on Lima and Andreotti to appoint Corrado Carnevale to review the sentence. Carnevale, known as "the sentence killer", had overturned many Mafia convictions on the slenderest of technicalities previously. Carnevale had to withdraw due to pressure from the public and from Giovanni Falcone, who at the time had moved to the ministry of Justice. Despite the fact that he served under an Andreotti-led government, Falcone was backed by the minister of Justice Claudio Martelli. In 1998, several Mafia bosses were sentenced to life in prison for Lima's murder, including Salvatore Riina. Tommaso Buscetta, moved by the deaths of Falcone and Borsellino, decided to break his long silence on ties between politics and Cosa Nostra. He acknowledged that he had known Lima since the late 1950s. On 16 November 1992, Buscetta testified before the Antimafia Commission presided by Luciano Violante about the links between Cosa Nostra and Lima and Andreotti. He indicated Lima as the contact of the Mafia in Italian politics. Buscetta testified: "Salvo Lima was, in fact, the politician to whom Cosa Nostra turned most often to resolve problems for the organisation whose solution lay in Rome."

Other collaborating witnesses confirmed that Lima had been specifically ordered to fix the appeal of the Maxi Trial with the Supreme Court of Cassation and had been murdered because he failed to do so. Gaspare Mutolo stated: "I knew that for any problems requiring a solution in Rome, Lima was the man we turned to. Lima was killed because he did not uphold, or couldn’t uphold, the commitments he had made in Palermo ... The verdict of the Supreme Court was a disaster. After the Supreme Court verdict, we felt we were lost. That verdict was like a dose of poison for the mafiosi, who felt like wounded animals. That's why they carried out the massacres. Something had to happen. I was surprised when people who had eight years of a prison sentence still to serve started giving themselves up. Then they killed Lima and I understood." According to Mutolo, "Lima was killed because he was the greatest symbol of that part of the political world which, after doing favours for Cosa Nostra in exchange for its votes, was no longer able to protect the interests of the organisation at the time of its most important trial."

== Legacy ==
While the allegations of Lima being tied to the Mafia are generally held as true, he was never formally charged or convicted of such allegations, and it remains unknown whether he was a made man within the Mafia. The suspicion that he had relations with Cosa Nostra appeared several times in various reports of the Antimafia Commission, and the Chamber of Deputies rejected requests for authorization to proceed against him four times. In 1993, the Antimafia Commission led by senator Luciano Violante concluded that there were strong indications of relations between Lima and members of Cosa Nostra. According to the Mafia defector Leonardo Messina, "Lima became the prisoner of a system. Before this latest generation, being a friend of mafiosi was easy for everybody ... It was a great honour for a mafioso to have a member of parliament at a wedding or a baptism ... When a mafioso saw a parliamentarian he would take off his hat and offer him a seat." With the rise of power of the Corleonesi, this changed profoundly. Messina said: "Now, it has become an imposition: do this or else."

In the 1998 trial for the murder of Lima, Giuseppe Calò, Francesco Madonia, Bernardo Brusca, Salvatore Riina, Giuseppe Graviano, Pietro Aglieri, Salvatore Montalto, Giuseppe Montalto, Salvatore Buscemi, Nenè Geraci, Raffaele Ganci, Giuseppe Farinella, Benedetto Spera, Antonino Giuffrè, Salvatore Biondino, Michelangelo La Barbera, and Simone Scalici were sentenced to life imprisonment, while Salvatore Cancemi and Giovanni Brusca were sentenced to 18 years in prison and the collaborators of Justice Francesco Onorato and Giovan Battista Ferrante (who confessed to the crime) were sentenced to 13 years as material perpetrators of the ambush. In 2003, the Supreme Court of Cassation annulled the sentence to life imprisonment for Pietro Aglieri, Giuseppe Farinella, Giuseppe Graviano, and Benedetto Spera.

== Electoral history ==
Election	House	Constituency	Party	Votes	Result
1968	Chamber of the Deputies	Palermo–Trapani–Agrigento–Caltanissetta	DC	80,387	Elected
1972	Chamber of the Deputies	Palermo–Trapani–Agrigento–Caltanissetta	DC	84,755	Elected
1976	Chamber of the Deputies	Palermo–Trapani–Agrigento–Caltanissetta	DC	100,792	Elected
1979	European Parliament	Italian Islands	DC	305,308	Elected
1984	European Parliament	Italian Islands	DC	256,633	Elected
1989	European Parliament	Italian Islands	DC	246,912	Elected

== Bibliography ==
- Dickie, John (2004). Cosa Nostra: A History of the Sicilian Mafia. London: Coronet. ISBN 0-340-82435-2.
- Jamieson, Alison (2000). The Antimafia: Italy's Fight Against Organized Crime. London: MacMillan Press. ISBN 0-333-80158-X.
- Schneider, Jane T.; Schneider, Peter T. (2003). Reversible Destiny: Mafia, Antimafia, and the Struggle for Palermo. Berkeley: University of California Press. ISBN 0-520-23609-2.
- Servadio, Gaia (1976). Mafioso: A History of the Mafia from Its Origins to the Present Day. London: Secker & Warburg. ISBN 0-440-55104-8.
- Stille, Alexander (1995). Excellent Cadavers: The Mafia and the Death of the First Italian Republic. New York: Vintage. ISBN 0-09-959491-9.
