= Tullio De Mauro =

Italian linguist (1932–2017)

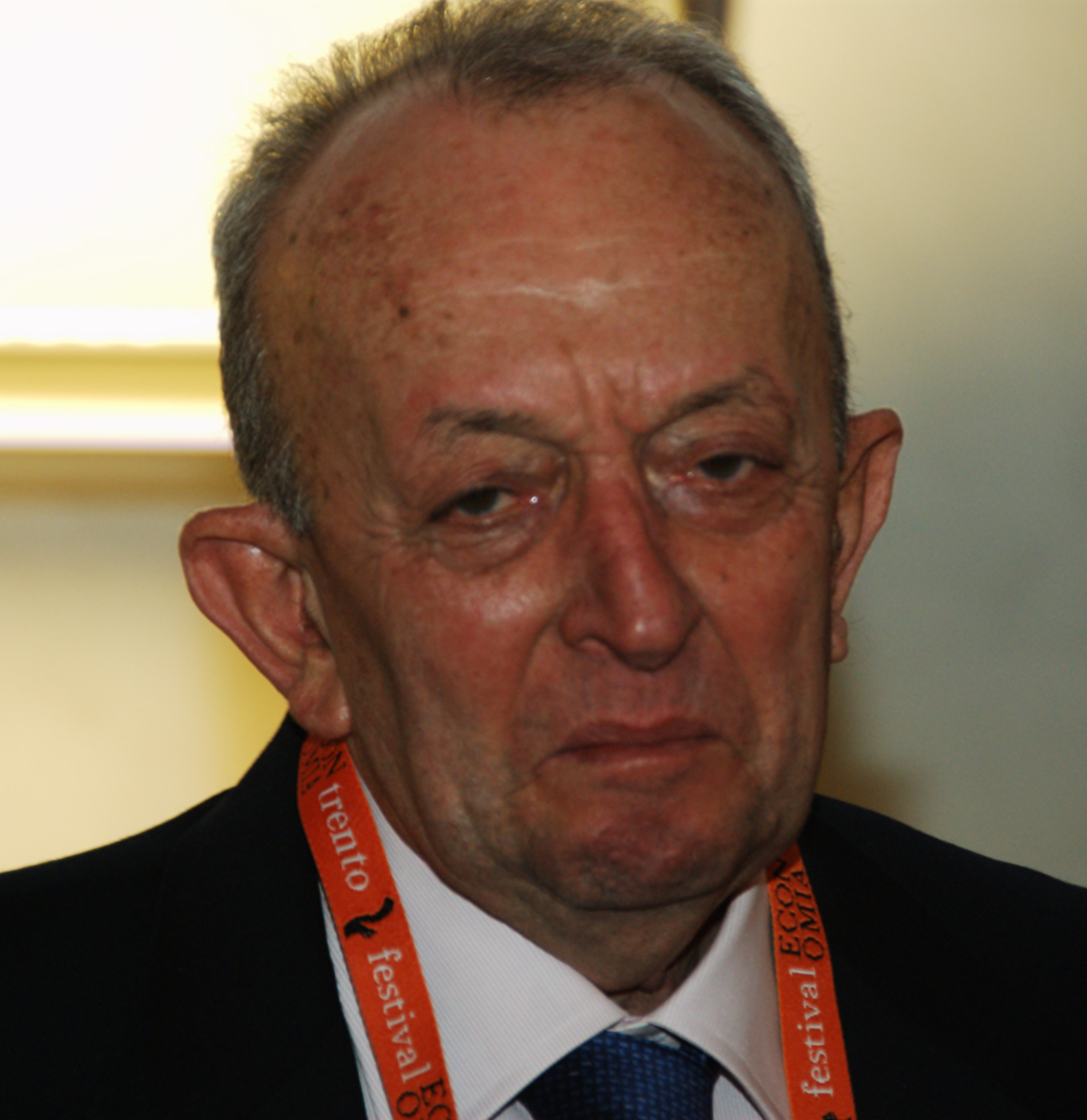
- De Mauro in 2007.

Italian Minister of Education
- In office 25 April 2000 – 11 June 2001
- Prime Minister: Giuliano Amato
- Preceded by: Luigi Berlinguer
- Succeeded by: Letizia Moratti

Personal details
- Born: 31 March 1932 Torre Annunziata, Italy
- Died: 5 January 2017 (aged 84) Rome, Italy
- Party: Independent
- Relatives: Mauro De Mauro (brother)
- Education: Sapienza University of Rome

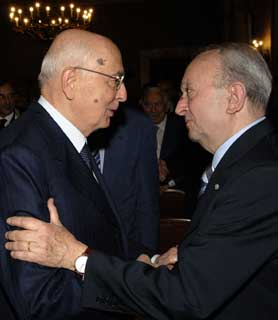
Tullio De Mauro with the Italian President Giorgio Napolitano

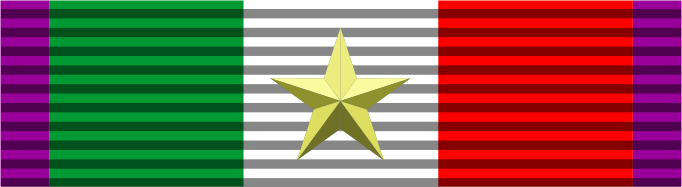
Medal meritorious of science and culture - Rome, 1 June 2007

1st Class / Knight Grand Cross - Rome, 11 June 2001

2nd Class / Grand Officer - Rome, 2 May 1996

Tullio De Mauro (31 March 1932 – 5 January 2017) was an Italian linguist and politician. De Mauro was Professor Emeritus of General Linguistics at the Sapienza University of Rome, and held the post of Italian Minister of Education from 2000 to 2001.

== Career ==
Born in Torre Annunziata, De Mauro was the younger brother of the journalist Mauro De Mauro, who was kidnapped and killed in September 1970, while investigating the Sicilian Mafia.

In 1963, De Mauro published the monumental Storia linguistica dell'Italia unita ("Linguistic History of Unified Italy"). Two years later De Mauro published L'introduzione alla semantica ("Introduction to Semantics") and, in 1971, Senso e significato. After preparing the entries on semiotics of the Treccani encyclopedia and publishing the short volume Minisemantica (1982), De Mauro turned to the problem of language education.

De Mauro was a professor at the D'Annunzio University of Chieti–Pescara, and was director of the Department of Linguistic Science at the University of Rome La Sapienza, where his students included the noted linguists Gennaro Chierchia and Anna Thornton.

In 1975 he was elected to the Regional Council of Lazio in the lists of PCI. In 1976 he has been appointed commissioner for culture, position he held until 1978.

He served as Minister of Education during the second Government of Prime Minister Guliano Amato.

From 2001 to 2010 he chaired digital world, the foundation of the city of Rome.

His newspaper and magazine writing included: from 1956 to 1964 in the weekly Il Mondo, from 1966 to 1979 in the newspaper Paese Sera, and from 1981 to 1990 regular columns on schooling (1981–85) and language (1986 onward) in the weekly L'Espresso. He made occasional contributions to L'Unità, La Stampa, La Repubblica, Il Manifesto, Il Sole-24 Ore, and Il Mattino. He wrote a regular column for Internazionale under the rubrics "The word" starting in 2006 and "Schools" from 2008.

From 1960 to 1973 he often appeared on radio and television RAI, an activity he resumed in 1997-2000. From 1978 onward he also worked on various RTSI (Swiss Italian Radio and Television) radio and TV broadcasts.

== On Esperanto ==
As a linguist, De Mauro also took an interest in Esperanto, writing about the language in his works. He was especially interested in the likely advantages of Esperanto for the EU legislative system, as a witness or reference version of European laws and official documents. He also edited a foreword for the Esperantic manual of Bruno Migliorini (Cooperativa Editoriale Esperanto, Milan, 1995).

== Conferences ==
De Mauro delivered lectures and gave seminars at universities in several countries:

- Albania (Tirana, 2005),
- Argentina (1995, Buenos Aires),
- Belgium (1968: UL Brussels 1974: Leuven and Louvain visiting UC),
- Brazil (1995 and Fluminense Federal Rio de Janeiro),
- Canada (1988 Quebec; 1993 Montreal),
- Chile (1995: State, Santiago),
- China (1988: Peking Bedo;, 2005: Faculty of languages),
- France (1969: Aix-en-Provence; 1972: Paris VII),
- West Germany (1987: Heidelberg, Tübingen, 1990: Köln, Hamburg),
- Germany (1994: Freie Universitaet Berlin, Potsdam, 2008 Freie Universitaet Berlin and Humboldt, Stuttgart 2009),
- Japan (1980: Waseda University and University of Tokyo Tokyo, Kyoto, Osaka, 1987, visiting Waseda University Tokyo, 1988, Waseda University Tokyo, Kyoto, 1990: Waseda University, Sophia University, Tokyo, 1995, Waseda University, as a guest of the Japan Foundation;, 2002, 2004, 2006, 2008: Tokyo Waseda),
- Great Britain (1979: Reading, London 2004),
- Greece (2009: Panteion University of Athens),
- Hungary (1985: Budapest, Szeged),
- Netherlands (1975: Amsterdam),
- Norway (1978: Oslo, Bergen),
- Romania (Bucharest, 2009),
- Spain (1969: Madrid, 1985.1989, 2003 Barcelona, 1993, Cordoba, Málaga, 1994: Zaragoza),
- Sweden (1966: Stockholm, Uppsala, Gothenburg, 1978: Uppsala, 1989, Stockholm, 2005 Stockholm),
- Switzerland (1968: Geneva, Zürich, Basel, 1972: Geneva, 1977 Geneva, Bern, 1987, Geneva, 1991: visiting Bern),
- United States (New York University 1992).

He held single guest lectures at numerous Italian universities and Italian cultural institutes abroad. Among his most noteworthy lecture series were those held at the Scuola Normale Superiore di Pisa in 1973, the Scuola Superiore Studi Pavia IUSS as visiting professor in 2007, the University of Tübingen in 2009, and the online Università telematica internazionale Uninettuno in 2009.

== Honors ==
- Rome 1 June 2007 - Medal meritorious of science and culture (From the Italian President Giorgio Napolitano)
- Rome 11 June 2001 - 1st Class / Knight Grand Cross (From the Italian President Carlo Azeglio Ciampi)
- Rome 2 May 1996 - 2nd Class / Grand Officer (From the Italian President Oscar Luigi Scalfaro)

He received the Giambattista Vico Foundation of Naples and Vatolla international prize in 2009. On 23 June 2006, in recognition of lifetime research and scholarship, the Accademia Nazionale dei Lincei awarded him the Prize of the President of the Republic, which was presented by Italian President Giorgio Napolitano in October.

He was granted numerous honorary degrees, including:

- 1999 he was nominated honorary doctor philosophiae et litterarum by the Catholic University of Louvain
- 2005 doctor honoris causa ENS (École Normale Supérieure)
- 1 April 2008, the Waseda University in Tokyo nominated doctor honoris causa in humanities
- 27 February 2009 the University of Bucharest named him an honorary doctor
- 10 November 2010 by the University Sorbonne Nouvelle.

== Bibliography ==
- Storia linguistica dell'Italia unita (prima edizione 1963, Laterza)
- Introduzione alla semantica (prima edizione 1965, Laterza)
- Introduzione, traduzione e commento del Corso di linguistica generale di Ferdinand de Saussure (prima edizione 1967, Laterza; dal 1972 l'apparato di De Mauro correda l'edizione originale francese)
- Senso e significato (raccolta di saggi, 1971, Adriatica, Bari)
- Ludwig Wittgenstein: his Place in the Development of Semantics (1966, Dordrecht)
- Parlare italiano (1973)
- Scuola e linguaggio (1977, 1978)
- Guida all'uso delle parole (prima edizione 1980, Editori Riuniti)
- Minisemantica (prima edizione 1982, Laterza)
- Capire le parole (raccolta di saggi, prima edizione 1994, Laterza)
- Direzione del Grande Dizionario Italiano dell'Uso, 6 voll. (1999, Utet)
- Prima lezione sul linguaggio (2002, Laterza)
- La cultura degli italiani a cura di Francesco Erbani (2004, Laterza)
- La fabbrica delle parole (2005, Utet)
- Introduzione, traduzione e commento degli Scritti inediti di linguistica generale di Ferdinand de Saussure (2005, Laterza)
- Parole di giorni lontani (2006, il Mulino)
- Lezioni di linguistica teorica (2008, Laterza)
- Che cosa è una lingua
- In principio c'era la parola? (2009, Il Mulino)
- Parole di giorni un po' meno lontani (2012, il Mulino)
- La lingua batte dove il dente duole (2013, Laterza; scritto con Andrea Camilleri)
