= Scintilla (communist group) =

Scintilla was a communist circle created in Rome in 1940, as one of a number of attempts to refound the Communist Party of Italy (PCd'I) banned since 1926. Most of its leaders would later contribute to creating the dissident-communist Movimento Comunista d'Italia, largest formation of the Italian Resistance in Rome.

It issued two issues of a newsletter, and brought together a number of former communist and anarchist militants working in post, rail and other sectors. The organisation was smashed by Roman police in December 1942, only to resurface in the liberalisation period following Pietro Badoglio's 25 July 1943 coup against Benito Mussolini.

Leading members of Scintilla included Tigrino Sabatini (executed 3 May 1944), a veteran of the PCd’I and Arditi del Popolo; the youthful San Lorenzo carpenter Orfeo Mucci, son of an anarchist bakers’ union leader; the cobbler Ezio Lombardi (executed 24 March 1944), a 1920s organiser of the Rome PCd’I who had been expelled from a confino organisation on ‘security grounds’ in 1930; the septuagenarian lawyer Raffaele de Luca, a former anarchist who served as Socialist mayor of Paola in 1921 before joining the PCd’I; the postman Ernesto Sansone (who died at a German prison camp after his November 1943 deportation); the Christian-socialist graphic designer Francesco Cretara, who was later co-editor of Bandiera Rossa; the florist Agostino Raponi, a veteran Communist from the Abruzzo region who joined Togliatti's PCI in prison after his December 1942 arrest; the Socialist statistician Pietro Bàttara; the grenadier captain Aladino Govoni (executed 24 March 1944), whose father was a futurist poet; and Socialist journalist Ezio Villani. Scintilla's only female member, Anna-Maria Enriques (executed 12 June 1944 in Florence) was a Christian-socialist sacked from her job at the Tuscan capital's state archives in 1938 because her father was Jewish.
