= Giovanni Spampinato =

Italian investigative journalist

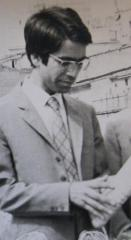
- Giovanni Spampinato
- Born: Giovanni Spampinato; November 6, 1946; Italy
- Died: October 27, 1972 (age 26); Italy
- Cause of death: Murder
- Occupation: Journalist
- Employer: L'Ora
- Organization: Newspaper
- Relatives: Alberto Spampinato (Brother)
- Website: giovannispampinato.it

Giovanni Spampinato (Italian pronunciation: [dʒoˈvanni spampiˈnaːto]; 6 November 1946 – 27 October 1972) was an Italian investigative journalist for the Italian newspaper L'Ora (Translated: "The Hour") in Ragusa, Province of Ragusa, Sicily, Italy, who brought to attention mafioso Roberto Campria's connection to a murder in February 1972, before his own murder eight months later.

== Personal ==
As children, the Spampinato brothers were influenced by the politics of their father Peppino, who had fought in Yugoslavia and was an active communist. Giovanni and his brother Alberto Spampinato both became journalists. Giovanni Spampinato took a job at the newspaper L'Ora after graduating with a degree in philosophy from the University of Catania in 1969. He was a member of the Italian Communist Party and ran for a political office but lost.

== Career ==
Giovanni Spampinato was an investigative journalist for the L'Ora, a communist newspaper. There he reported on fascists in Ragusa and Catania. Among his reports for L'Ora was a connection between the Sicilian mafia and murder, which is how he began to report about the person who confessed to murdering him. While his reporting focused on Roberto Campria's involvement in the mafia, some people believe it was his reporting of Campria's alleged involvement in the murder of Angelo Tumino, an antiquity dealer, that led to Campria murdering him. In 2008, the Spampinato family received an anonymous and previously unpublished letter about the motive of jealousy behind Angelo Tumino's murder 25 February 1972 and was an act out of jealousy. After Angelo Tumino was killed, Spampinato began to investigate the murder and dig deeper into the Sicilian Mafia. He was investigating Roberto Campria involvement with the Mafia and his connection to Tumino's murder. During this time, he was leaking information about the Mafia in great detail.

L'Ora eventually stopped publishing in 1992 after being around since the early 1900s.

== Death ==
Ragusa, Polermo is located in Italy and shown relative to the capital Rome.

Roberto Campria confronted Giovanni Spampinato around the corner from a prison in Ragusa, Italy, and Campria shot him six times with a Smith & Wesson revolver while Spampinato was inside of his white Fiat Cinquecento shortly before 11 p.m., 27 October 1972. Campria then went to the prison and confessed to the murder. He said he acted out in a fit of rage due to Spampinato falsely accusing him of his Mafia work. Although Campria was originally sentenced to 24 years, his sentence was reduced to 14 years on appeal, but he served only eight years.

== Context ==
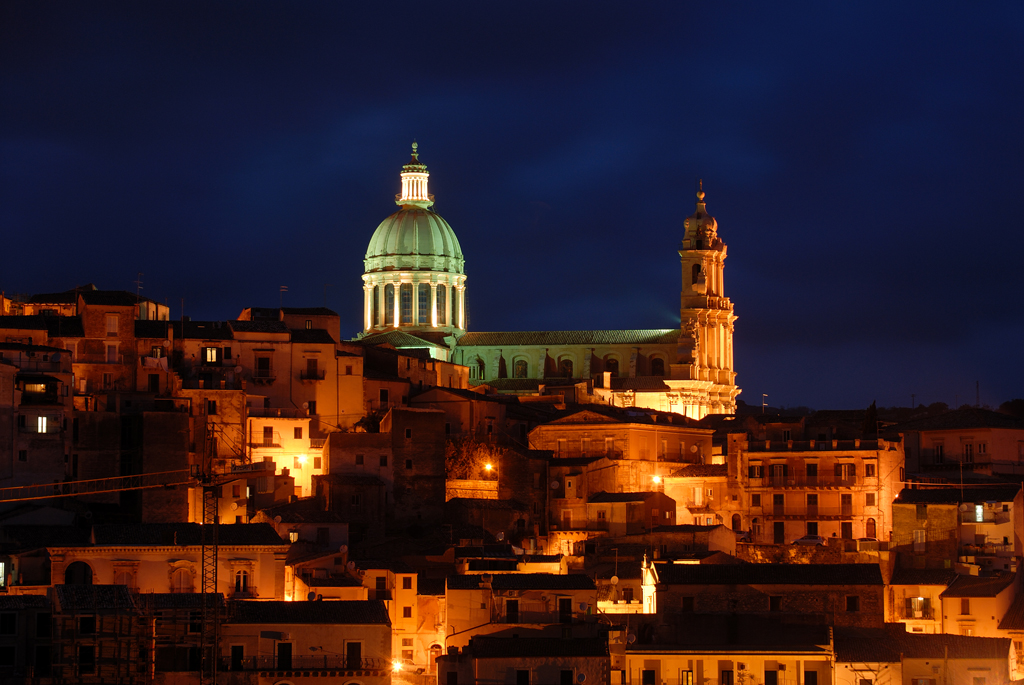
The city scape of Ragusa, Italy at night.

The Sicilian Mafia, also known as Cosa Nostra ("Our Thing"), not only killed Spampinato but 12 other journalists as well. Cosimo Cristina (in Italian) was murdered in 1960 on railroad tracks by the mafia. Mauro De Mauro was disappeared in 1970 after uncovering details about the death of politician Enrico Mattei. Cristina, De Mauro and Spampinato also worked at L'Ora. This newspaper, under the leadership of Vittorio Nisticò, published anti-Mafia information. Other journalists killed by the Sicilian mafia were Giuseppe Impastato, murdered in 1978, Carmine "Mino" Pecorelli in 1979, Mario Francese in 1979, Giuseppe Fava in 1984, Giancarlo Siani in 1985, Mauro Rostagno (in Italian) in 1988, and Beppe Alfano (in Italian) in 1993. Those journalists were primarily working at the local level and were not nationally known.

== Impact ==
Alberto Spampinato, inspired by his brother's murder, founded Ossigeno per l'informazione Osservatorio (Translated: Oxygen for Information Observatory) that is aligned with Freedom House and Reporters Without Borders and monitors the journalistic environment in Italy and safety and security issues.

== Reactions ==
Alberto Spampinato, journalist for the news agency Ansa and co-author of Vite ribelli, describes his brother: "A boy slim, slender, who by his looks seemed mild and harmless. Behind his glasses for short-sightedness, his eyes shined with curiosity, and intelligence and desire emerge."

A few local newspapers described him as "a torturer," "a communist blinded by class hatred" that had begun to target "that guy from a good family," destroying his life and reputation. After Spampinato's death, he started being recognized as a journalist who was murdered while doing his story.

== Awards and recognition ==
In 2007, Saint-Vincent Journalism Awards presented a posthumous Special Jury Award to Giovanni Spampinato.

Every year, the city of Ragusa has sponsored a forum about Spampinato and the facts surrounding his murder.

== Media about Spampinato ==
- C'erano bei cani ma molto seri (2009)
- L'ora di Spampinato (2012 film)

== See also ==
- List of victims of the Sicilian Mafia
- List of journalists killed in Europe
