= Tigrino Sabatini =

Tigrino Sabatini (8 March 1900 – 3 May 1944) was a communist and a leader of the Italian Resistance, executed for his activities as a zone-commander of the Movimento Comunista d'Italia, also known as Bandiera Rossa.

Born in the province of Siena, the young Sabatini was an early member of the Communist Party of Italy, and militarily resisted the initial rise of Fascism in the ranks of the Arditi del Popolo. Having worked in Rome's Snia tram factory, Sabatini joined the Scintilla group in 1940, in the attempt to re-create the Communist Party after its long repression under Benito Mussolini's rule.

Joining the dissident MCd'I/Bandiera Rossa upon its creation in August 1943, Sabatini advocated a strategy for the partisan struggle, and criticised the moderation of official Communist Party leaders: in the tramworker's view 'Lenin turned war into revolution. Stalin, Togliatti and [the Rome PCI's Mario] Alicata send militants to fight the war'. He quickly became a popular commander of the MCd'I's 'Second Zone', which included his home district of Torpignattara, organising numerous armed actions against Occupation forces as well as distributing food among the population.

Arrested on 23 January 1944, Sabatini was imprisoned at the Via Tasso SS prison and subsequently Regina Coeli. Twice put on trial, he was sentenced to death on 14 April 1944 and executed on 3 May, less than five weeks before the Anglo-Americans liberated Rome.

Sabatini's final words are on display at the Fosse Ardeatine's 'Monument to the Martyrs', though he did not in fact die in the Nazi massacre at these caves to the south of Rome. A thin strip of paper at the memorial presents his last plea to future generations, 'Don't forget why we died, don't exploit our death'. This statement came to prominence in Italian media in 2008, as 'post-Fascist' mayor of Rome Gianni Alemanno visited the Monument in an effort to burnish his democratic credentials, in what was widely characterised as a cynical attempt to use Resistance commemorations for political gain.

A biography of Sabatini appears on the ANPI veterans' association website. In 1979 he was posthumously awarded a Silver Medal of the Resistance, and in 2015 a square near the site of his arrest was named in his honour.
