= Cosimo Cristina =

Italian journalist

Cosimo Cristina (Italian pronunciation: [ˈkɔːzimo kriˈstiːna]; 11 August 1935 in Termini Imerese – 5 May 1960 in Termini Imerese) was an Italian journalist killed by the Mafia.

== Biography ==
Cristina began his career as a journalist in 1955 when he was twenty. Then he founded and ran in Palermo the newspaper "Prospettive Siciliane". From 1959 he worked as a correspondent for L'Ora of Palermo, for Il Giorno of Milan, for the agency ANSA, for Il Messaggero of Roma and for Il Gazzettino of Venice.

=== Murder ===
Young and ambitious, with the periodic founded by him, he followed with particular attention the crime beat, the mafia phenomenon and its ramifications in the territories of Termini Imerese and Caccamo. Those activities led up to his death sentence by certain mafia clans . The circumstances of the murder were studied as if it had been a suicide. In fact he was found first of all dead on the tracks of the railways inside the tunnel Fossola near Termini Imerese, and this led the investigators to think it had been a suicide.

His family was the first to raise the issue and point out some particulars, then his colleagues at L'Ora of Palermo, and also the brave journalist Mario Francese (also a victim of the mafia), but only 6 years later this case was reopened. In 1966 was carried out the autopsy on the journalist's body: the experts Marco Stassi and Ideale Del Carpio excluded that he had killed himself and they confirmed that he had been killed. From this moment Cosimo Cristina was totally forgotten.

In 1999 the journalist Luciano Mirone from Catania dug up the case and he found out that the deputy commissioner of Palermo Angelo Mangano in 1966, famous for a photo known all over the world while he handcuffed the boss of Corleone Luciano Liggio, reopened the inquiry and wrote an explosive report that was neutralized by the result of the postmortem. Mangano found out that the reporter had been killed and then deposited on the tracks for feigned the suicide. The councilor of the Christian Democracy Agostino Rubino (one of the mafia bosses of Termini) and the boss Santo Gaeta were accused by the cop of being the instigators of the murder, who then were exonerated.

After a lot of years, Mirone resumed that correspondence and brought it to light, by underlining contradictions in the autopsy report, brought to the attention of Vincenzo Milana, a teacher of Forensics at the University of Catania. He asked to the Public Prosecutor's Office of Palermo, through a collection of signatures, the reopened of the inquiry, but the outcome was negative. However the municipal administration of Termini Imerese dedicated a road in honor of the missing journalist in 2000.

On 5 May 2010, Termini's associations, solicited under the local newspaper "Espero", deposed a tombstone out of the tunnel "Fossola", where was found the body of Cosimo Cristina.

== Bibliography ==
- Gli Insabbiati. Storie di giornalisti uccisi dalla mafia e sepolti dall'indifferenza. Roma: Castelvecchi.
- Luciano Mirone, recital-monologo: "Uno scandalo italiano. Storia di Cosimo Cristina, il primo giornalista 'suicidato' da Cosa Nostra" (2011).
- Roberto Serafini, Enza Venturelli. Vi racconto il mio Cosimo Cristina, Tricase, Edizioni Youcanprint, 2015. ISBN 978-88-9119-618-7
- Giuseppe Francese, "Suicidato" dalla mafia?, L'inchiesta Sicilia, 22 aprile – 5 maggio 1998

== See also ==
- Giancarlo Siani
- Giuseppe Impastato
- Mario Francese
