= Mazzarino, Sicily =

Mazzarino
- Comune
- Comune di Mazzarino
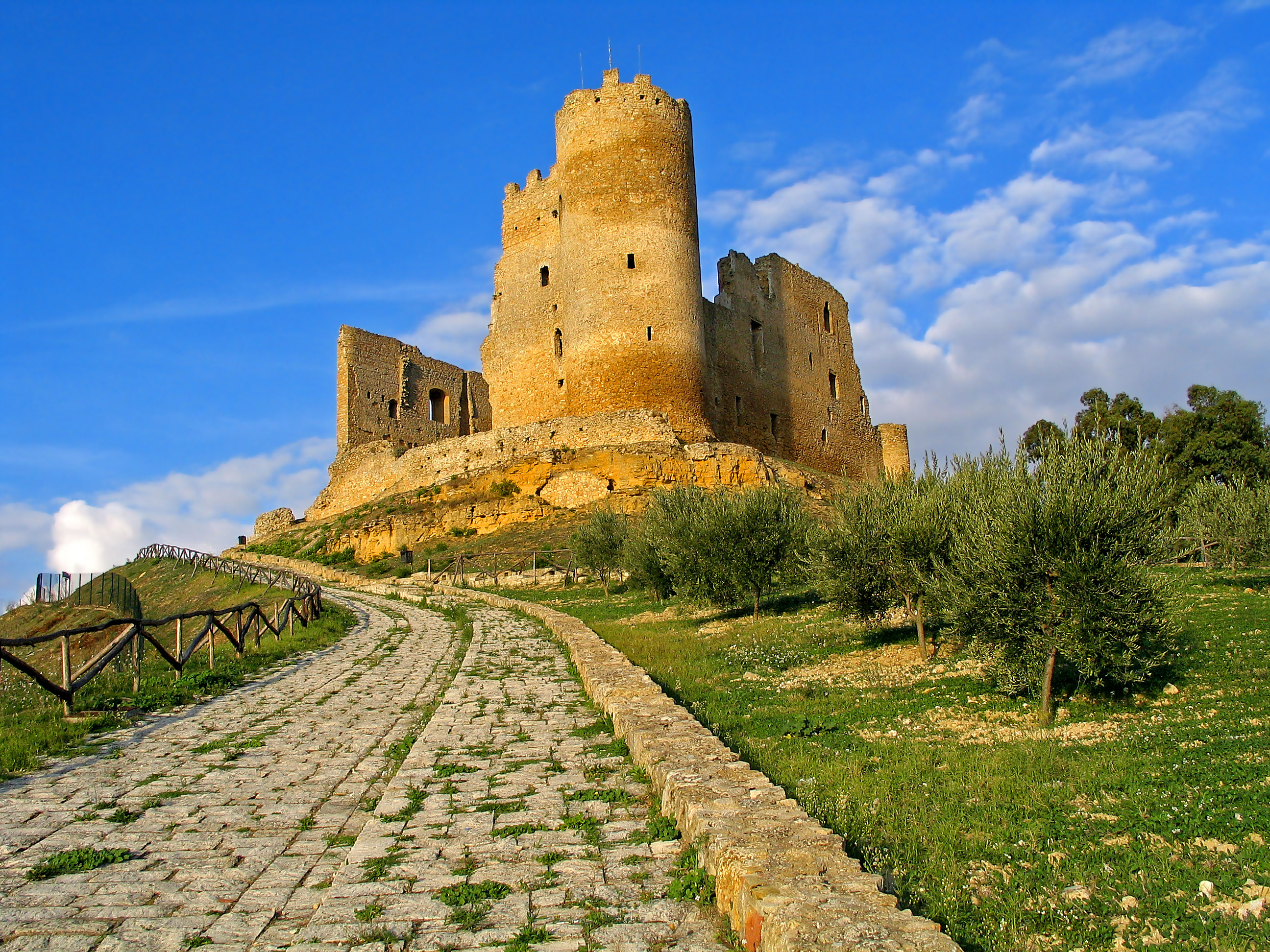
- 'U Cannuni castle.

- Coat of arms

- Location within Italy Location within Sicily
- Coordinates: 37°18′N 14°12′E
- Country: Italy
- Region: Sicily
- Province: Caltanissetta (CL)

Government
  - Mayor: Domenico Faraci

Area
  - Total: 293 km^{2} (113 sq mi)
- Elevation: 553 m (1,814 ft)

Population (31 October 2017)
  - Total: 11,900
  - Density: 40.6/km^{2} (105/sq mi)
- Demonym: Mazzarinesi
- Time zone: UTC+1 (CET)
  - Summer (DST): UTC+2 (CEST)
- Postal code: 93013
- Dialing code: 0934
- Website: Official website

Mazzarino (Sicilian: Mazzarinu) is a city and comune in the province of Caltanissetta in the region of Sicily, Italy.

The city emerged in the second half of the 13th century. In 1507, the lords of the manor received the title Count of Mazzarini.

It is home to two castles.

In the 1950s, the local friary was the stage for the highly debated Mazzarino Friars case.

== Twin towns ==
- Cinisello Balsamo, Italy
