= Francesco Vassallo =

Italian entrepreneur

Francesco Vassallo a.k.a. don Ciccolo, don Frankie or King Concrete (born c. 1910) was an Italian entrepreneur that associated with Mafia in the 1950s. His son Giuseppe "Pino" Vassallo was kidnapped in 1971.
