= Felice Chilanti =

Italian anti-fascist and journalist

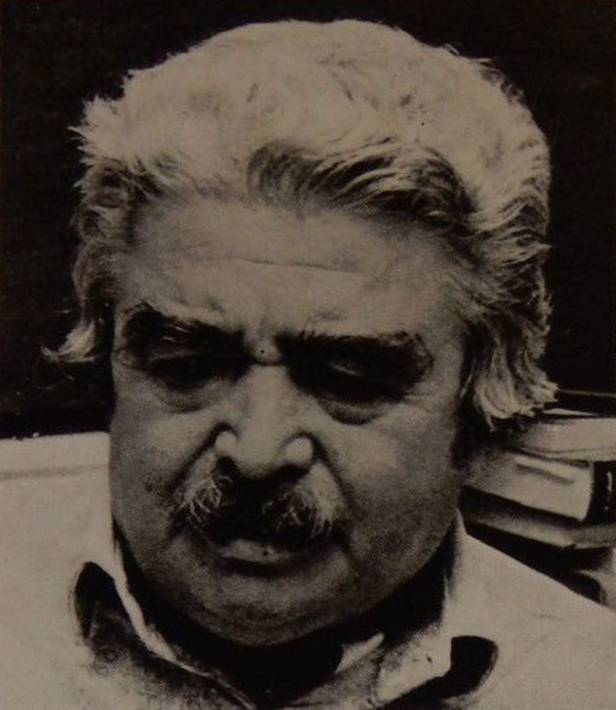
Felice Chilanti

Felice Chilanti (10 December 1914 in Ceneselli – 26 February 1982 in Rome) was an Italian anti-fascist and journalist.

== Biography ==
He was born to a Rovigo peasant family soon before Italy entered World War I. Chilanti moved to Rome as a teenager to study agronomy and from 1934 took up employment as a writer for the farming union's in-house journal. He was soon drawn to the Fascist Left by Giuseppe Bottai and Edmondo Rossoni who were syndicalists who viewed Fascism as a social revolution against capitalism.

Chilanti wrote an October 1939 article in Benito Mussolini's Gerarchia welcoming the Hitler-Stalin pact as heralding the future collaboration of the Soviet and Fascist régimes. During the war Chilanti became increasingly disillusioned with his government's failure to live up to its purported anti-capitalist objectives. While seeking to advance such radical policies he formed a group around the newspaper Ventuno Domani, whose collaborators included novelist Vasco Pratolini.

This 'anarcho-Fascist' circle drew the attention of Philo-Nazi American poet Ezra Pound. Chilanti and his ally, Vittorio Ambrosini, mounted one of the most militant of all Left-Fascist projects when they attempted to eliminate the foreign minister Galeazzo Ciano, whom the plotters saw as a conservative brake on the regime. Chilanti was quickly arrested and sent into internal exile [confino]. Chilanti then adopted communist politics from his Croatian cellmates.

During the Italian Resistance Chilanti was co-editor of the dissident-communist newspaper Bandiera Rossa, organ of the Movimento Comunista d'Italia, an idiosyncratic force that Chilanti labelled 'the party of Stalin who fought for Bordiga'. After liberation, Chilanti joined the Italian Communist Party. He later grew disillusioned and signed up to the extra-parliamentary Avanguardia Operaia. As a result of throat cancer Chilanti was unable to speak in his final years.

Chilanti wrote numerous novels of which many were of a semi-autobiographical bent.
