= Vito Ciancimino =

Italian politician (1924–1992)

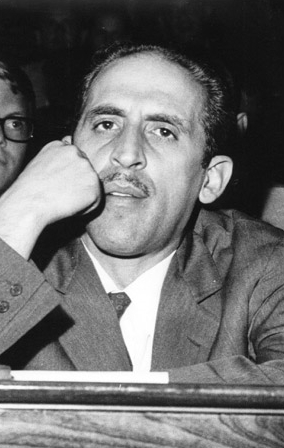

Mayor of Palermo
- In office 25 November 1970 – 27 April 1971
- Preceded by: Francesco Spagnolo
- Succeeded by: Giacomo Marchello

Personal details
- Born: 2 April 1924 Corleone, Sicily, Italy
- Died: 19 November 2002 (aged 78) Rome, Lazio, Italy
- Party: Christian Democracy
- Spouse: Epifania Silvia Scardino
- Children: Massimo Ciancimino
- Profession: Politician; Mafioso
- Nickname: ù Sindaco

Vito Alfio Ciancimino (Italian: [ˈviːto ˈalfjo tʃantʃiˈmiːno]; 2 April 1924 – 19 November 2002) was an Italian politician close to the Mafia leadership who became known for enriching himself and his associates by corruptly granting planning permission. An abrasive personality, he served briefly as mayor of Palermo, Sicily, as a Christian Democrat. Ciancimino was close to Mafia boss and perennial fugitive Bernardo Provenzano, but regarded Salvatore Riina as irrational.

In the aftermath of Mafia bomb outrages in the 1990s, Ciancimino was contacted by Carabinieri Colonel Mario Mori, but the content of the discussions is disputed. Ciancimino is said to have alleged a list of demands from Riina as the "boss of bosses". As his price for halting attacks was passed on, charges were brought against Mori, who maintained there had been no list, that his contacts with Ciancimino were aimed at combating the Mafia, and that he had disclosed little beyond implicitly admitting he knew Mafia members.

== Early career ==
Ciancimino was born in Corleone, a village that became notorious for its powerful Mafia gang, the Corleonesi. Ciancimino's father had lived in America and gained a job as interpreter for occupying US forces at the end of WW2. He used the contacts to build up various business enterprises and Vito was raised in what in Corleone was a relatively prosperous home. He was hired to teach Bernardo Provenzano maths early, and had other contacts with fellow townsmen who were to become Mafia bosses in later life. He studied engineering at University of Palermo but did not complete his degree. As a Christian Democrat politician, he became a protégé of Bernardo Mattarella, who supported his political and financial career. In 1950 Ciancimino obtained concessions for all railway transport inside Palermo. The three other firms that had made a bid were put out of the game, because Ciancimino's bid was accompanied by a letter of Mattarella, who was then Minister of Transports. This set the pattern for his career, which consisted of cutting deals to loot public assets for the benefit of himself and associates.,

== Sack of Palermo ==
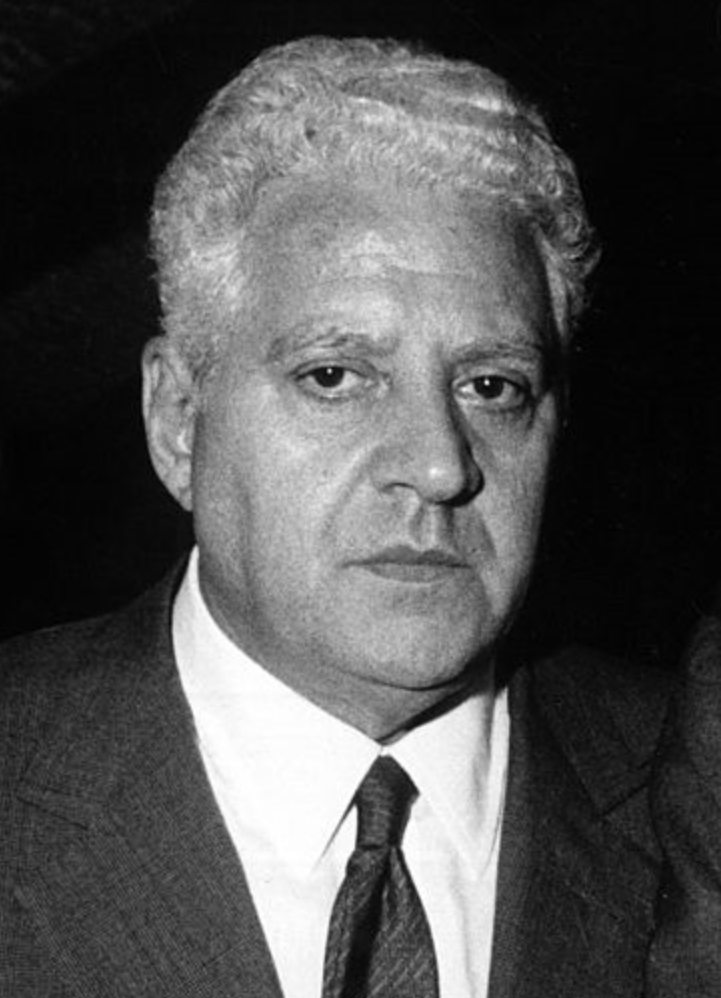
Salvo Lima

The railway concession became a turning point in Ciancimino's life. He became a rich man, moved house and changed his style of life. In 1959, when a fellow Christian Democrat, Salvo Lima, became mayor of Palermo, Ciancimino became assessor for public works and building permits. This period would be the peak phase of what is called the Sack of Palermo, a construction boom that led to the destruction of the city's green belt, and villas that gave it architectural grace, to make way for characterless and shoddily constructed apartment blocks. In the meantime Palermo’s historical centre was allowed to crumble.

Ciancimino, described by the Mafia turncoat Tommaso Buscetta as "a pushy Corleonese embezzler", made a vast fortune in bribes. Ciancimino was candid about the need for bribes. If the Christian Democrats had 40% of the votes, they needed 40% of the construction contracts, he explained. Italy simply would not work without bribes: "It's as though someone wanted to remove one of the four wheels of a car."

== Mayor of Palermo ==
Ciancimino's election as Mayor of Palermo in October 1970 caused an uproar. The Italian Parliament's Antimafia Commission expressed reservations about his election and he was soon under investigation for embezzlement of city funds, as well as for his apparent links with the mafia. In April 1971 Ciancimino stood down from office. Although the Antimafia commission would provide abundant documentation of the relationship between the Mafia and other such political and entrepreneurial notables, Ciancimino remained among the untouchables.

== Arrest and conviction ==
Ciancimino was arrested in 1984 after the testimony of Mafia pentito (turncoat) Tommaso Buscetta. He was charged with improperly awarding $400m worth of public works contracts, mafia conspiracy, fraud and embezzlement. Magistrates discovered he had a vast fortune, held in bank deposit books under imaginary names or in Canadian banks.

Buscetta linked him with two of the most notorious mafiosi: Salvatore Riina and Bernardo Provenzano, the leaders of the most powerful Mafia group, the Corleonesi, from Ciancimino's hometown. After lengthy judicial proceedings he was brought to trial and in 1992 was sentenced to 13 years' imprisonment for Mafia associations and for laundering millions of dollars. It was the first time a politician had been found guilty of working with the Mafia. Thanks to protracted appeals, the sentence did not become effective until November 2001. Ciancimino was expelled from the Christian Democrat Party.

Ciancimino during the trial

In 1992, following the Mafia murders of Salvo Lima and the Antimafia judges Giovanni Falcone and Paolo Borsellino, Ciancimino, was approached by Carabinieri Colonel Mario Mori and had several secret meetings. What followed is a matter of dispute. Allegedly, Ciancimino acted as go between, and Bernardo Provenzano, passed on a list of Riina's demands for an end to the bombings. According to his son, Ciancimino declared that Provenzano, himself one of the most wanted Mafia fugitives, betrayed Riina by indicating the precise location of Riina's hiding place. The Carabinieri version is that Balduccio Di Maggio, an ambitious Mafioso who Riina had reprimanded, turned informer and showed where a wealthy businessman who acted as Riina's driver lived. enabling the January 1993 arrest of Riina in Palermo, by Mori's unit. Mori and the minister he was responsible to were later acquitted on charges of negotiating with the Mafia and failing to arrest Provenzano who succeeded Riina as the overlord of the mafia. Ciancimino claimed Carabinieri tricked him before Riina's capture by suggesting he ask for the return of his passport, taken from him as a precautionary measure, knowing the request would lead to judges ordering his imprisonment as a flight risk.

== Last years and missing fortune ==
Ciancimino spent his last years in relative comfort. Since he was in poor health, his sentence was commuted to house arrest in Rome. He was allowed to go shopping and on chauffeur-driven rides into the Alban Hills. When the Palermo city council sought €150m in damages from him in March 2002, he retorted: "Do they want it all in cash?" Treasures already identified as belonging to him include a yacht, historic buildings, a Ferrari and smart shops in Palermo. Ciancimino died of a heart attack at the age of 78, on 19 November 2002. His fortune remained elusive.

His son, Massimo Ciancimino, was arrested in June 2006 and charged with money laundering and other offences. Prosecutors believe the fortune accumulated by the son and heir of Vito Ciancimino could be about €60 million. They claim to have established a paper trail linking Ciancimino Jr. to accounts in the Virgin Islands, Amsterdam and Switzerland. In the notes found at the shack outside Corleone where Provenzano was arrested, two of the hundreds of his notes mention Ciancimino by name. One note claims angrily that Ciancimino had stolen "money not his to have fun in Rome, money that was meant to go to the families of [Mafia] prisoners who are in need ..."

Ciancimino was Mafia boss Bernardo Provenzano's creature, he protected and promoted him to protect his own interests. The pentito Gioacchino Pennino revealed that Provenzano had guided and advised Ciancimino, launched and directed his political career, and personally confronted anyone who was disloyal. Falcone described Ciancimino as "the most political of the mafiosi and the most mafioso of the politicians."

== Sources ==
- Dickie, John (2004). Cosa Nostra. A history of the Sicilian Mafia, London: Coronet, ISBN 0-340-82435-2 (Review in the Observer, February 15, 2004)
- Schneider, Jane T. & Peter T. Schneider (2003). Reversible Destiny: Mafia, Antimafia, and the Struggle for Palermo, Berkeley: University of California Press. ISBN 0-520-23609-2
- Servadio, Gaia (1976), Mafioso. A history of the Mafia from its origins to the present day, London: Secker & Warburg. ISBN 0-436-44700-2
