= Palazzo Filangeri-Cutò =

Palazzo Filangeri-Cutò may refer to one of two palaces. The palace in the nearly abandoned site of Santa Margherita di Belice is the better known, because as a childhood home of Giuseppe Tomasi di Lampedusa, it was the inspiration for the aristocratic family in the famous 19th-century novel il Gattopardo.

- Palazzo Filangeri-Cutò, Santa Margherita di Belice, Sicily, Italy
- Palazzo Filangeri-Cutò, Palermo, Sicily, Italy
