= Giuseppe Tomasi =

Giuseppe Tomasi may refer to:

- Giuseppe Maria Tomasi (1649–1713), Italian Catholic priest, scholar, reformer, cardinal, and saint
- Giuseppe Tomasi di Lampedusa (1896–1957), Sicilian writer, Prince of Lampedusa and Duke of Palma di Montechiaro
