= The Professor and the Siren =

The Professor and the Siren or The Siren (original Italian title: La Sirena) is a novella by Giuseppe Tomasi di Lampedusa. It is sometimes known as Lighea, the name of the title character, which was the title chosen by the writer's widow.

== Background ==
The novella was the last work the author completed before his death. Lampedusa, who conceived the story while staying with his cousins Casimiro and Lucio Piccolo di Calanovella, penned the work during the winter of 1956-1957. The novella is a result of the brief and late creative period of the author who, in a very short span (1956-1957), wrote a small number of stories and works of various kinds, including essays and the novel The Leopard.

The Professor and the Siren, just as the remainder of Lampedusa's work, was only published posthumously in 1961 by Feltrinelli, the same publishing house that, three years earlier, had had the intuition leading to the posthumous publication of the novel The Leopard, a choice crowned with success from the critics and the public that would internationally consecrate the author. The manuscript was delivered by Elena Croce (daughter of the philosopher Benedetto Croce) to Giorgio Bassani, who oversaw the publication and wrote the accompanying preface.

== Plot ==
The narrative begins in 1938 in Turin and misty winter, where the encounter between two personalities different from each other, both Sicilians: the distinguished classicist Rosario La Ciura, an eminent retired professor of Ancient Greek and member of the Italian Senate, and the young Paolo Corbera di Salina, a Sicilian of noble birth who works as a journalist and chases skirts. Despite the cultural and generational gap, and the harshness of character of the professor, the meeting, which took place in a bar on Via Po, the young man can earn, without even knowing how, the professor's sympathy. The result is a mutual interest and a familiar partnership that leads gradually to open up the professor confidently to that young man and tell him of an episode far, during the preparation for the competition for the chair of greek at the University of Pavia. In those days, the risk of mad crazy after months of study, he was invited by a friend to move to a deserted huts on the coast of Sicily, at Augusta, where the magical encounter with the mermaid Lighea, the daughter of Calliope, the muse of epic poetry.

== Publication in English ==
In 1962, translated by Archibald Colquhoun, it was published in Two Stories and a Memory, a collection of short works by Tomasi with a preface by E. M. Forster. Forster described the novella as an "exquisite fantasy", while Edmund Wilson called it a "masterpiece". A new translation, by Stephen Twilley, was published by NYRB Classics in 2014.

== See also ==
- Ligeia, a short story by Edgar Allan Poe
- Sonnet 119 by William Shakespeare
