= Prince of Lampedusa =

Minor title in the Sicilian nobility

Princedom of Lampedusa
- Arms: Azure, a leopard rampant guardant Proper, standing upon a trimount Vert.
- Creation date: 13 August 1667
- Created by: Charles II of Spain
- Peerage: Peerage of Sicily
- First holder: Giulio Tomasi, 2nd Duke of Palma
- Last holder: Pietro Tomasi, 12th Prince of Lampedusa
- Subsidiary titles: Duke of Palma; Marquess of Torretta; Baron of Montechiaro; Baron of Torretta; Grandee of Spain, Second Class
- Status: extinct
- Extinction date: 1962
- Seat: Palazzo Lampedusa alla Marina
- Former seat: Palazzo Lampedusa
- Motto: Spes mea in Deo est ("In God lies my hope")

Prince of Lampedusa was a title in the Peerage of Sicily. It was created by Charles II of Spain (as well as of Naples and Sicily) in 1667 for Giulio Tomasi, 2nd Duke of Palma. By courtesy, the elder son of a Prince of Lampedusa would use the title Duke of Palma (di Montechiaro), created by Philip IV of Spain (as well as of Naples and Sicily) in 1637 for the first prince’s father, Don Cesare Tomasi, 2nd Baron of Montechiaro; a prince’s younger son would style himself with the subsidiary title Marquess of Torretta. The principal title refers to the island of Lampedusa in the Mediterranean Sea, which the Tomasi family sold to the state, along with the island of Linosa, in the 1840s. The holders of these titles (and their relatives) formed the Sicilian branch of the pan-Italian Tomasi family.

The famous Italian novelist Giuseppe Tomasi di Lampedusa was the last to officially hold the title of Prince of Lampedusa before the dissolution of the Kingdom of Italy; the last hereditary holder of the title was his uncle, sometime Italian ambassador in London and President of the Senate, Pietro Tomasi della Torretta. The principal seat of the Princes of Lampedusa, the Palazzo Lampedusa in Palermo, was badly damaged during the Allied invasion of Sicily in 1943. About a decade later, shortly before he died, Giuseppe Tomasi di Lampedusa wrote The Leopard, a novel based in part on the life of his great-grandfather, Don Giulio Tomasi, 8th Prince of Lampedusa. During the same period in which he was writing The Leopard, Giuseppe Tomasi adopted his own distant cousin Gioacchino Lanza, thereafter known as Gioacchino Lanza Tomasi. Lanza Tomasi did not inherit the title Prince of Lampedusa, but did use the title Duke of Palma as a courtesy.

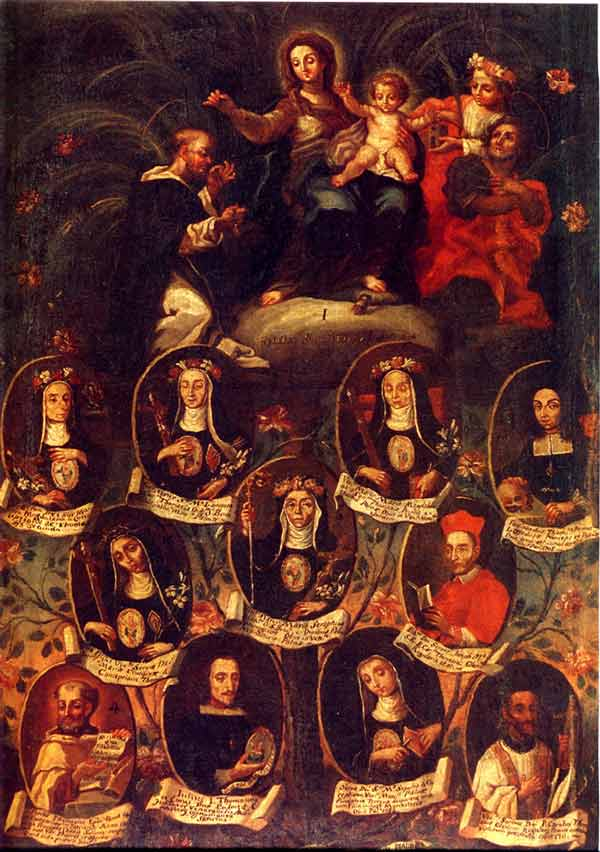
Priests and nuns of the Tomasi family

== Barons of Montechiaro (1563) and Dukes of Palma di Montechiaro (1637) ==
The title Baron of Montechiaro was created by Philip II of Spain (as well as of Naples and Sicily) in 1563 for Don Federico Tomasi.

- Don Federico Tomasi, 1st Baron of Montechiaro
  - Don Cesare Tomasi, 2nd Baron of Montechiaro, 1st Duke of Palma di Montechiaro
    - Don Giulio Tomasi, 3rd Baron of Montechiaro, 2nd Duke of Palma di Montechiaro, 1st Prince of Lampedusa (1614–1669)
      - See: Princes of Lampedusa (1667)

== Princes of Lampedusa (1667) ==
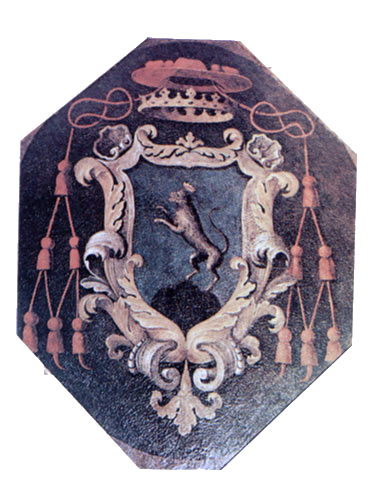
The coat of arms of the Tomasi di Lampedusa surmounted, for Don Giuseppe I Tomasi, by a cardinal’s galero (in an old Iberian-Italian style, i.e., with only six tassels per side)

- Don Giulio I Tomasi, 1st Prince of Lampedusa (1614–1669)
  - Donna Isabella Tomasi, better known as The Venerable Sister Maria Crocifissa della Concezione, of the Benedictine Monastery of Palma di Montechiaro (1645–1699)
  - Cardinal Don Giuseppe I Maria Tomasi, by courtesy Duke of Palma, better known as the "Saint Duke" Giuseppe Maria Tomasi (1649–1713)
  - Don Ferdinando I Tomasi, 2nd Prince of Lampedusa (1651–1672)
    - Don Giulio II Tomasi, 3rd Prince of Lampedusa (1672–1698)
      - Don Ferdinando II Maria Tomasi, 4th Prince of Lampedusa (1697–1775)
        - Don Giuseppe II Maria Tomasi, 5th Prince of Lampedusa (1717–1792)
          - Don Giulio III Maria Tomasi, 6th Prince of Lampedusa (1743–1812)
            - Don Giuseppe III Tomasi, 7th Prince of Lampedusa (1774–1831)
              - Don Giulio IV Fabrizio Tomasi, 8th Prince of Lampedusa (1813–1885)
                - Don Giuseppe IV Tomasi, 9th Prince of Lampedusa (1838–1908)
                  - Don Giulio V Tomasi, 10th Prince of Lampedusa (1868–1934)
                    - Don Giuseppe V Tomasi, 11th Prince of Lampedusa, 12th Duke of Palma (1896–1957)
                      - (adopted) Don Gioacchino Lanza Tomasi, by courtesy Duke of Palma, by birth a Lanza
                  - Don Pietro Tomasi, 12th Prince of Lampedusa, 13th Duke of Palma (1863–1962), by courtesy Marquess of Torretta, with whose death the Sicilian branch of the Tomasi family, including all their tiles, became extinct
              - Donna Caterina Tomasi, by marriage Princess of Niscemi (1810–1862)
                - Don Corrado Valguarnera Tomasi, 7th Prince of Niscemi (1838–1903)
                  - Donna Carolina Valguarnera, by marriage Duchess of Verdura (b. 1870)
                    - Don Fulco Santostefano della Cerda, 5th Duke of Verdura (1898–1978)
