= Alexandra von Wolff-Stomersee =

Latvian psychoanalyst, psychiatrist and psychologist (1894–1982)

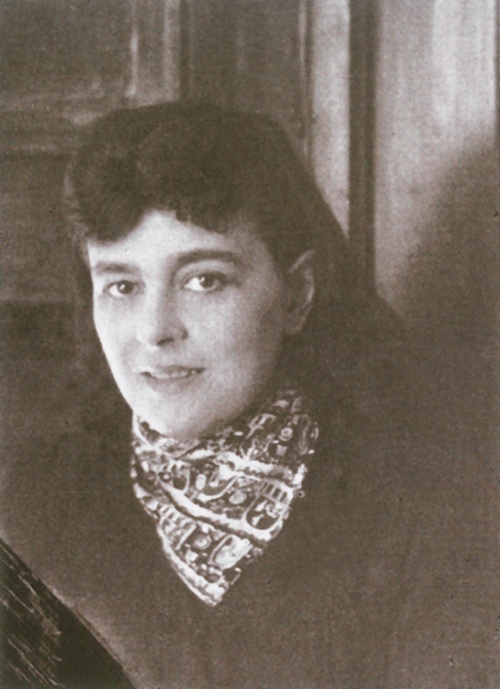
Alexandra von Wolff-Stomersee, sometime before 1930

Alexandra Tomasi, Princess of Lampedusa, Duchess of Palma (née von Wolff-Stomersee; born 13 November 1894 in Nice, France; died 22 June 1982 in Palermo, Italy), known to familiars as “Licy”, was an Italian and Baltic German psychoanalyst. She was the daughter of Italian mezzo-soprano and violinist Alice Barbi (1858-1948) and Baron Boris von Wolff-Stomersee (1850–1917).

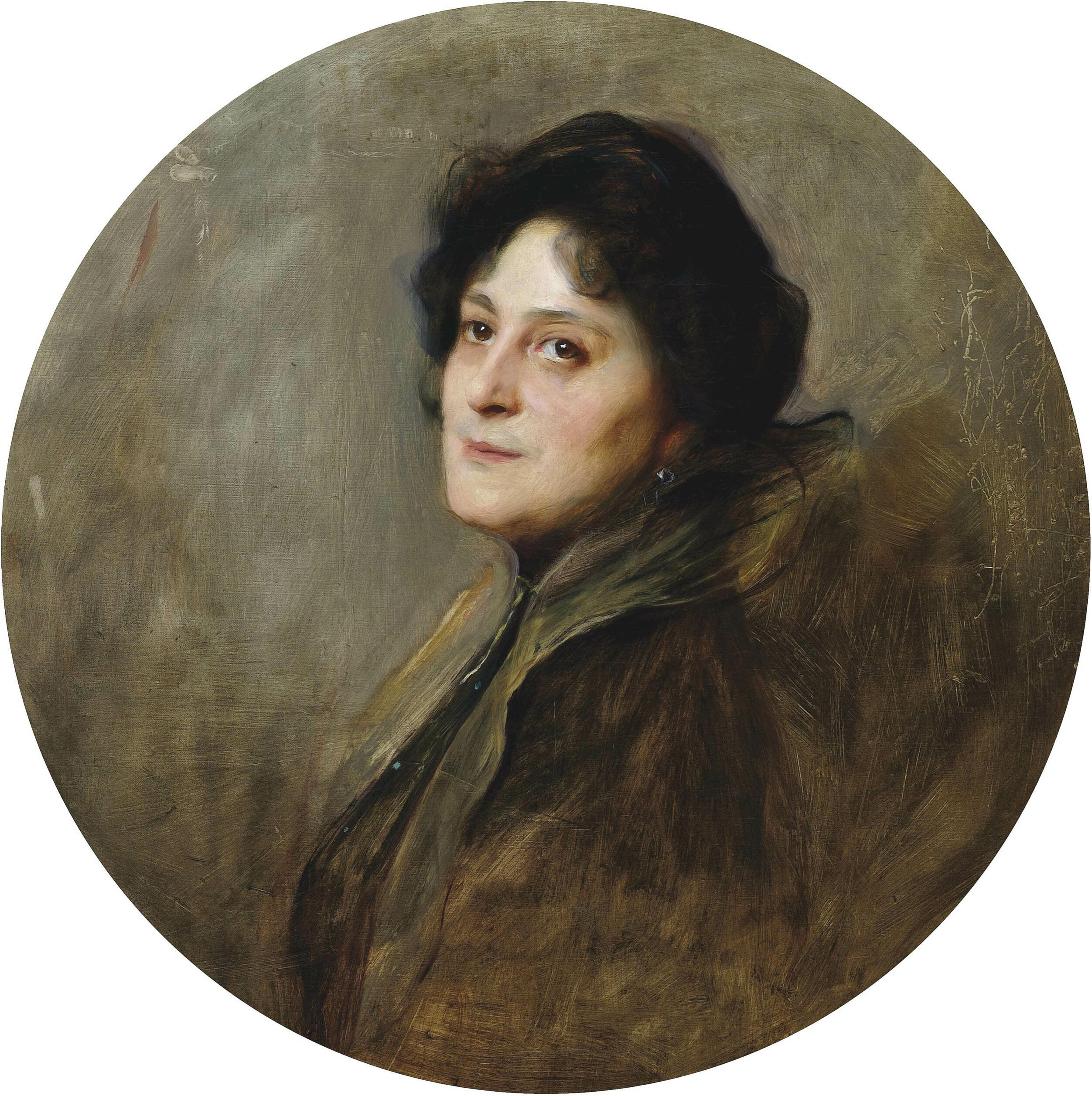
Portrait of Alice Barbi, mother of Alexandra von Wolff-Stomersee, by Philip de László (1901)

Raised in St. Petersburg, where her father was a high official in the court of Imperial Russia, in 1918 she married the Baltic German Baron André Pilar von Pilchau (1891–1960), an international banker. Pilar was gay, and the nature of the marriage is unclear. In the early 1920s she underwent psychoanalysis in Berlin with Felix Boehm, another Baltic German from Riga. Over the next several years she traveled between her residence in Latvia (Stomersee, now known as Stāmeriena Palace) and Berlin, where she studied psychoanalysis at the Berlin Psychoanalytic Institute. As a psychoanalyst, she was in the tradition of Karl Abraham.

Meanwhile, her mother had remarried, to Pietro Tomasi Della Torretta, who was Italian ambassador to the UK from 1922 to 1927. On a 1925 visit to London, Alexandra met Tomasi's nephew, Giuseppe Tomasi di Lampedusa, later author of The Leopard. The two met at various places in Europe over the next few years. In 1932, she obtained a divorce/annulment of her marriage to Pilar and married Tomasi di Lampedusa in a Annunciation of Our Most Holy Lady Church, Riga. She, Pilar, and Tomasi all seem to have been on quite friendly terms throughout, and apparently scandalized some of Tomasi's relatives by remaining so.

Tomasi did not tell his family about the marriage until it was a fait accompli. They first lived with Tomasi's mother at the Lampedusa Palace in Palermo, but the incompatibility between the two women soon drove her back to Latvia. Through the rest of the 1930s, Tomasi lived largely in Palermo and she variously in Riga or Stomersee; typically she made an annual winter visit to Palermo and he made a summer visit to the Baltic. She began practicing psychoanalysis in 1936.

The vicissitudes of World War II finally drove her from the Baltic to Rome (where her sister Lolette lived) and finally to Sicily. For the duration of the war in Italy, she and Tomasi lived mainly in Ficarra, sometimes with his mother, sometimes not. After the war (and the destruction of the Lampedusa Palace) the couple rented a place in Palermo. Her mother-in-law died in 1946, after which she and her husband consistently lived together until his death in 1957.

She was instrumental in the reorganisation of the Italian psychoanalytic society (SPI) after World War II and was the president of the SPI from 1954 to 1959. She was one of post-war Italy's first training analysts (based in Palermo); Francesco Corrao was one of her students. She served on the editorial board of the Rivista di Psicoanalisi, established in 1955

Her 1946 lecture "Sviluppi della diagnostica e tecnica psicoanalitica" ("Developments in psychoanalytic diagnostics and technique") introduced the concept of borderline personality disorder. Her 1950 lecture at the Second National Congress of the SPI, "L'aggressività nelle perversioni" ("Aggression in perversions") built on the Freudian concept of the death drive; in that lecture, she developed the theoretical foundation of aggressive narcissism, based on a case of necrophilia. In the early 1970s, she presented a talk about a patient of hers who thought he was a werewolf. This talk introduced the term "identificatory introjection" based on Melanie Klein's concept of "projective identification". She continued her private practice into her later years, as well seeing her late husband's works through to publication. She died in 1982 in Palermo.
