= Sicilian nobility =

Privileged hereditary class in Sicily

The Sicilian nobility was a privileged hereditary class in the Kingdom of Sicily, the Kingdom of the Two Sicilies and the Kingdom of Italy, whose origins may be traced to the 11th century AD.

== History ==
The Romans, Byzantines and Saracens exported different elements of their aristocratic structures to the island of Sicily, however, it was not until the Norman invasion of 1061, led by Roger I de Hauteville, that the Sicilian aristocracy and feudal system took root.

By the mid-twelfth century the majority of the island was divided into an agglomeration of agrarian communities (fiefs), controlled by Roger I, known as the Great Count, and his knights.

Count Roger was the youngest of five sons born to the petty Norman lord, Tancred de Hauteville. During the mid-eleventh century, southern Italian powers from the mainland sought military assistance from Norman mercenaries in an attempt to wrest control of Sicily away from its Saracen rulers. In 1068, Roger and his army of knights and foot soldiers were victorious at Misilmeri (Menzil el Emir), and by 1072 Sicily was under Norman control.

The knights were given estates for their loyalty and military service to Roger and his army. The Catalogus Baronum ("Catalogue of Barons"), was an early twelfth-century document listing the Norman vassals of the region and their respective feudal rights, possessions and duties. Although some historians claim it was a Norman creation others contend that it was modelled on the dîwân al-majlis, a document introduced by the Fatimidi prior to the Norman invasion.

Instead of renaming the regions which they controlled, the Norman aristocracy opted to change their own surnames, recorded in Catalogus Baronum, often adopting that of the territories over which they obtained authority and taxation powers. Historians contend that this is the reason why so little of the original document has names of Norman origin. Some argue that this was because the Norman invaders in Sicily were often cadets of petty Norman lords rather than Norman magnates; allegedly they simply did not want their Norman names on the document, opting to reinvent themselves in their new homeland. Even the Hauteville dynasty itself was descended from petty Norman lords. Knights who became the first barons arrived in the region unattached, often marrying into the local population. Historians contend that the simplicity of recording ownership of land, utilising pre-existing place names, and changing their own names to correspond with the barony, far outweighed a desire to hold onto their family names.

Roger I's son, Roger II, became Sicily's first king. By the mid-fourteenth century, the titles of baron and count were common, whereas formerly the vassals were either signori (lords) or cavalieri (knights). Although Sicilian feudalism did not entail serfdom, it did permit knights and barons to tax and control the lands they held in fee from the king.

Under Norman rule, the title signore signified the highest rank of landed nobility. Although frequent reference to the baronage can be found in Sicily as early as the fourteenth century, it was not until the nineteenth century that these signori were formally designated baroni and their property holdings baronies. Some families favoured the Longobard system of land transfer, inheritance divided amongst all male heirs; however, most Norman families were practitioners of male primogeniture, the Frankish custom of inheritance, which served to maintain family fiefdoms in their original form. Conversely, under the Longobard system estates became smaller over time.

Over the centuries, established noble families were advanced through the aristocratic ranks. By the eighteenth century, the titles principe, duca and marchese were held by many men whose ancestors, only several centuries earlier, had been barons and lords. Conte, signore and cavaliere are titles that have been used by the Sicilian nobility. Over the centuries many families emerged as landed aristocracy or nobility similar to the English gentry and peerage.

== Modern history ==
Although at its inception nobility was a military honour, with conquering kings at the top of the feudal landscape and their trusted knights below, rewarded with land, wealth, and title for loyalty and bravery, by the sixteenth century nobility was no longer exclusive to the conquerors. Clergy, lawyers, bureaucrats, notaries, merchants, bankers and wealthy landowners entered the gates of the nobility. Title, like most valuables, became a purchasable commodity.

Infante Carlos, Duke of Calabria and his second cousin, Prince Carlo, Duke of Castro, are rival claimants to the non-regnant dignity of Head of the deposed Royal House of the Two Sicilies. Their branch of the House of Bourbon acquired the crowns of Naples and Sicily in the 18th century. Their dynasty was the fount of honour which regulated the titulature of the Sicilian nobility until their deposition in 1860, whereupon the House of Savoy as the new kings of Italy recognized the titles, but not the traditional precedence, of the Sicilian nobility as part of the Italian nobility.

One of the most celebrated members of twentieth century Sicilian aristocracy is Giuseppe Tomasi, the 11th Prince di Lampedusa (1896–1957), most remembered for his novel Il Gattopardo (1958), for which he won the Strega Prize. Published posthumously, it recounts the genteel decline of Sicilian aristocratic grandeur of the 19th century, remains the highest-selling novel in Italian history, and is widely regarded as one of the most important works of contemporary Italian literature. Tomasi's other works include I Racconti (Stories, first published in 1961), Le Lezioni su Stendhal (Lessons on Stendhal, 1959) and "Letters from London and Europe", published in 2010.

Without the feudal responsibilities of their ancestors many members of Sicilian aristocracy emigrated from their native land, sometimes to the Italian peninsula, to other locales of the European continent and Britain, or to North and South America. As an example, Gioacchino Cristoforo Ventimiglia of the noble Ventimiglia family relocated from Sicily to Vallon, Switzerland. His heir, Jack Cristoforo Ventimiglia II, of Vallon, lives in London.

Another example is Baron Marco di Serramarrocco who, having left for a professional career in England, returned to start his own winery on his family's estate. Others have adapted to modern day economic conditions by renting out their homes/sections of their homes, developing vineyards on their property, setting up agrotourism sometimes themed to replicate the lifestyle of a bygone era etc. Others have sold their estates, parts of their residences, even their coats of arms in recent years.

With so many descendants of the landed Sicilian aristocracy leaving their native Sicily for foreign shores, and more descendants being born outside of aristocratic circles than within, maintaining social ties has been difficult, and has certainly lost importance in recent decades. Like gentlemen's clubs of the British Raj which faded into obscurity as colonialism receded, clubs with membership reserved for descendants of noble Sicilian families have largely disappeared as centers of aristocratic socializing and tradition, only a few, such as the Circolo Bellini in Palermo, remain. Influence is maintained in social and charitable endeavors by aristocratic organisations like the Sacred Military Constantinian Order of Saint George which still has representation in Sicily.
