= Di Lampedusa strategy =

Political doctrine

The di Lampedusa strategy or di Lampedusa principle (often misspelled de Lampedusa strategy) is a political doctrine that in order to maintain the status quo, one must accept change. It takes its name from the Italian novelist Giuseppe Tomasi di Lampedusa, who expressed the principle in his novel Il Gattopardo.

== Definition ==
In the words of Judith Bessant,

The principle is that the best way to respond to seriously disruptive change threatening substantial political transformation is to make concessions to those who are posing it, to appease and diffuse political energies and emotions. In short, the di Lampedusa strategy involves placating, appropriating and incorporating the opposition in order to secure the older-prevailing system.

== Origin ==
Giuseppe Tomasi di Lampedusa's novel The Leopard follows the family of its title character, the Sicilian nobleman Don Fabrizio Corbera, Prince of Salina, through the events of the Risorgimento. In the story, Don Fabrizio's nephew, Tancredi, urges that Don Fabrizio should abandon his allegiance to the disintegrating Kingdom of the Two Sicilies and ally himself with Giuseppe Garibaldi and the House of Savoy. Tancredi says: "Unless we ourselves take a hand now, they'll foist a republic on us. If we want things to stay as they are, things will have to change". The point-of-view character, Don Fabrizio, explicitly rejects this view, and despite the name "di Lampedusa strategy" there is little reason to think the author himself endorsed it.
