= Alice Barbi =

Italian musician (1858–1948)

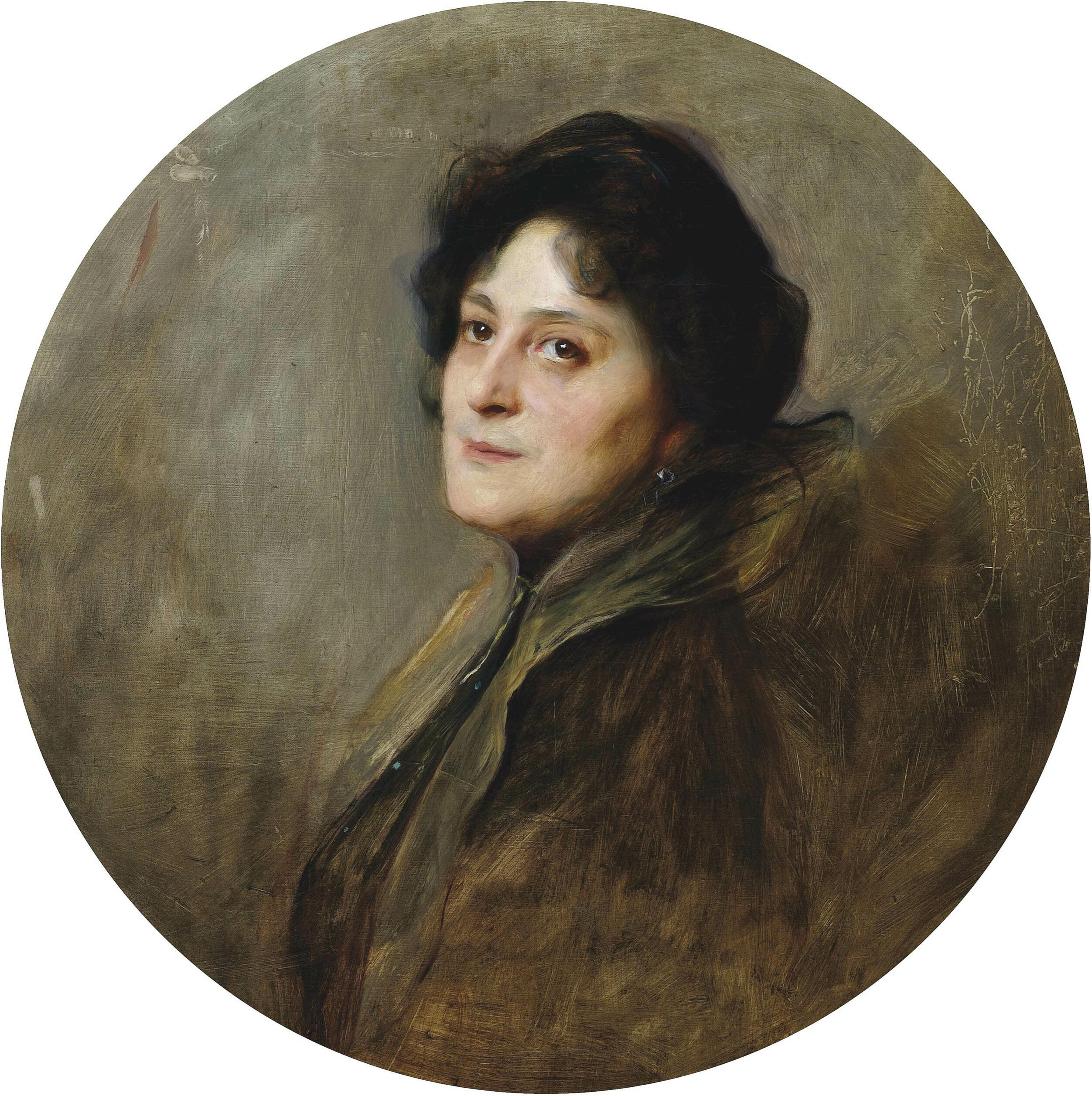
Portrait of Alice Barbi by Philip de László (1901)

Alice Laura Barbi (1 June 1858 – 4 September 1948) was an Italian mezzo-soprano and violinist. She had a short, yet successful career as a concert performer. She was a close friend of Johannes Brahms.

== Biography ==
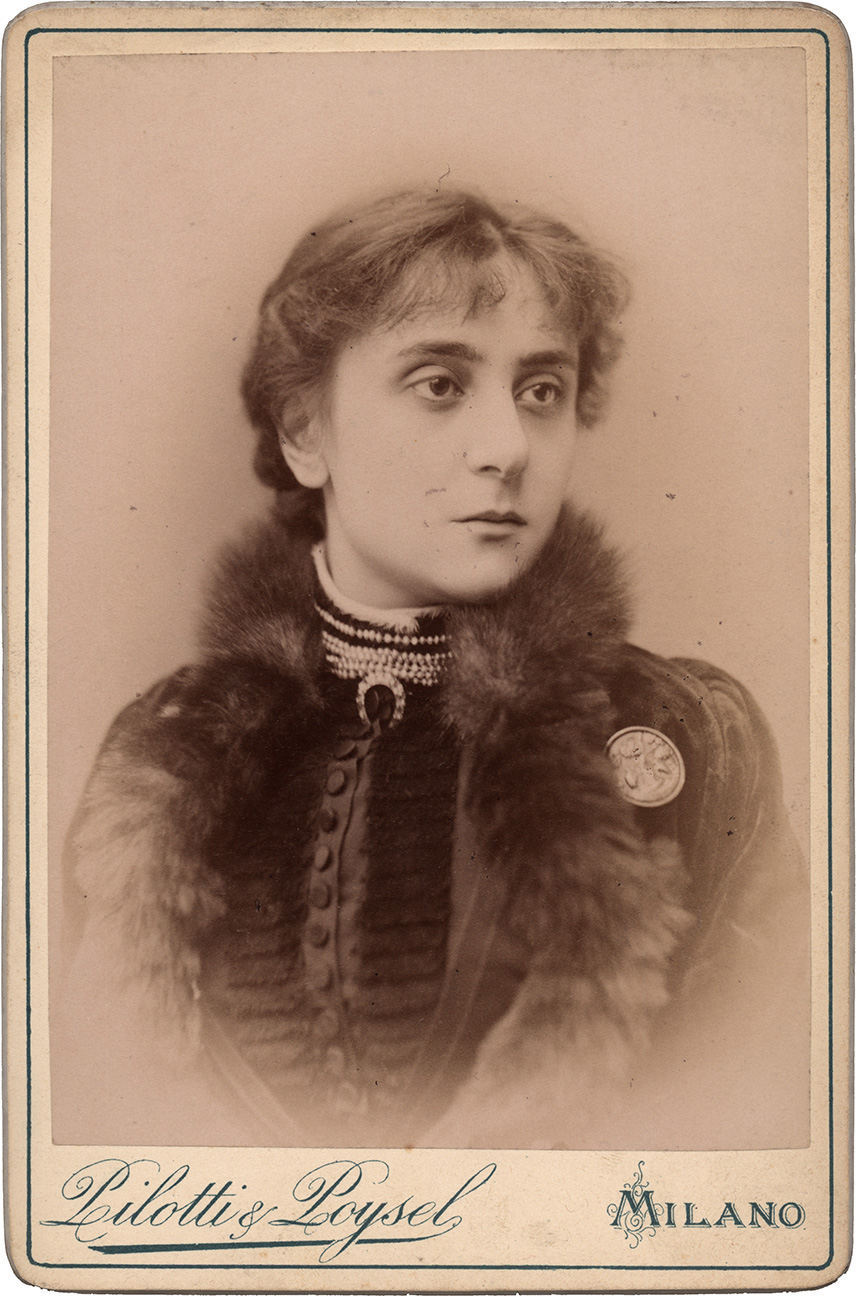
Alice Barbi

Alice Barbi was born in Modena, Duchy of Modena and Reggio on 1 June 1858. She began studying music at a young age under her father Henry's guidance. She was a near-prodigy violinist, debuting at the age of seven. After staying in Egypt she studied in Bologna at the Conservatorio Giovanni Battista Martini. She was trained in musical theory and studied multiple languages. She attended lectures by Carlo Verardi. She later dedicated herself to singing, studying with Luigi Zamboni and Alessandro Busi in Bologna and later with Luigi Vannuccini in Florence, where she had moved with the help of the Corsini family.

Barbi started her singing career alongside Antonio Cotogni and Giovanni Sgambati in a concert at the Quirinale. Her public debut was a concert organized by impresario Andreoli in Milan on 2 April 1882. The program included four arias from Handel, Haydn, Jommelli, and Rossini. Schumann and Schubert were her specialities for recitals. A review by William Beatty-Kingston in The Theatre praised the two chamber music recitals she gave at Prince's Hall in July 1886. He referred to her as the best cantatrice di camera in Europe and described her singing as "the outcome of a rare and surprising combination of natural gifts and indefatigable cultivation." Her program for the recitals illustrated the development of vocal music since the 17th century. Beatty-Kingston wrote that "All the laudatory adjectives in my vocabulary are insufficient to express my sense of the beauty, grace and poetical feeling characterising her rendering of these compositions, one and all." In addition to singing, she performed as a violinist on occasion. Barbi spent considerable time abroad, traveling to Austria, Germany, England, and Russia.

Barbi found an ardent admirer in German composer Johannes Brahms and the pair were close friends in his final years. Brahms wrote to Austrian composer Richard Heuberger about Barbi toward the close of 1890, relating that "From someone like Barbi we can all learn! Above all the Italian lady sings supremely steadily, with a solid pulse, and... projects the structure of every piece she sings." Brahms arranged for Barbi to visit Clara Schumann that autumn. The first time he heard her sing one of his songs, he said, "Today I've heard my songs for the first time." Brahms would accompany Barbi around Venice. While their relationship was platonic, it was the subject of gossip and Brahms told Ignaz Brüll that she was the only woman he had wanted to marry after middle age.

Barbi's career was short. She retired from the stage on 21 December 1893 to marry Baron Boris von Wolf-Stomersee (1850–1917). Brahms provided piano accompaniment for her farewell concert's entire program. Barbi had two daughters, Alexandra (1894–1982), who became a psychoanalyst and married Giuseppe Tomasi di Lampedusa, and Olga (1896–1984), who married diplomat Augusto Biancheri Chiappori and was the mother of Boris Biancheri.

Following Stomersee's death in 1917, Barbi married Pietro della Torreta, the Italian Ambassador to Great Britain, in 1920.

Barbi died in Rome on 4 September 1948.
