= Carmelo Samonà =

Italian academic and writer (1926–1990)

Carmelo Samonà (17 March 1926 – 17 March 1990) was an Italian academic and writer, as well one of the most important Italian Hispanists.

== Biography ==
He came from the Sicilian aristocratic family Samonà, and was the son of the architect Giuseppe Samonà. In 1936 he settled in Rome.

From 1961 he taught Spanish literature at the La Sapienza of Rome. Among his works as a Hispanist are, among others, his La letteratura spagnola dal Cid ai Re Cattolici (with Alberto Varvaro, 1972). He was an Academic of the Lincei since 1987, and in 1984 was awarded the Juan Carlos Prize of the Spanish Academy. From 1976 he collaborated with the newspaper la Repubblica with articles on modern Spanish and Hispano-American literature.

Samonà is also remembered as a writer, having published two successful novels with Einaudi: Fratelli (his 1978 debut novel, partially autobiographical) and Il custode (1983). Fratelli tells the story of the narrator's relationship with his brother suffering from a mental illness (in reality, it is Samonà's relationship with his son); he was the winner of the Mondello Prize and finalist of the Strega Prize in 1978, finalist of the Bergamo Prize in 1985 and winner of the Pozzale Luigi Russo Prize in 2002. The novel was subsequently republished by Garzanti, included in the series Gli elefanti, and in 2002 published by Arnoldo Mondadori Editore, in the complete works entitled "Fratelli" e tutta l'opera narrativa edited and with a preface by Francesco Orlando. In addition to the two novels, Samonà wrote the short story Casa Landau (Garzanti, 1990) and the theatrical text Ultimo seminario.

== Works ==
=== Essays ===
- Profilo di storia della letteratura spagnola, Veschi, Roma, 1960.
- Calderon nella critica italiana, Feltrinelli, Milano 1960
- Studi sul romanzo sentimentale e cortese nella letteratura spagnola del Quattrocento, vol. I, Carucci editore, Università di Roma, Roma, 1960.
- La letteratura spagnola dal Cid ai Re cattolici, in collaboration with Alberto Varvaro, Sansoni-Accademia, Firenze-Milano, 1972.
- Della letteratura spagnola degli Secoli d'Oro, in collaboration with Guido Mancini, Francesco Guazzelli, Alessandro Martinengo, Sansoni-Accademia, Firenze-Milano, 1973.
- Ippogrifo violento (Studi su Calderòn, Lope e Tirso), preface by Mario Socrate, Garzanti, Milano, 1990.

=== Narrative ===
- Fratelli, Einaudi, Torino 1978; Garzanti, Milano 1991; UTET, Torino 2006, with preface by Domenico Starnone
- Il custode, Einaudi, Torino 1983; Garzanti, Milano 1993
- Casa Landau, with editorial note by Francesco Orlando, Garzanti, Milano 1990
- Fratelli e tutta l'opera narrativa, edited by Francesco Orlando, Mondadori, Milano 2002 [includes Fratelli, Il custode, Casa Landau, the short story L'esitazione, the theatrical text Ultimo seminario and the prose of Cinque sogni]
- Fratelli, with an essay by Francesco Orlando, Sellerio, Palermo 2008
