= Antonio Francesco Vezzosi =

Italian Theatine and writer

Antonio Francesco Vezzosi (4 October 1708, at Arezzo, Italy – 29 May 1783, in Rome) was an Italian Theatine and biographical writer.

== Life ==
In 1731 he entered the Theatine Congregation. On account of his unusual abilities he was appointed professor of philosophy at the seminary at Rimini (1736–38). In 1742 he was sent to Rome as professor of theology at Sant'Andrea della Valle. While here he became favourably known for his scholarship and orthodoxy. His superiors entrusted him with the editing of the collected works of Giuseppe Maria Tomasi (11 vols., Rome, 1749–69).

The attention of Pope Benedict XIV was thus called to him, and in 1753 the pope appointed him professor of church history at the College of the Sapienza and examiner of candidates for the episcopal office. Later he was also elected general of his congregation.

== Works ==
Among his publications are an oration on Pope Leo X, "De laudibus Leonis" (Rome, 1752), and the biographical work "I scrittori de' Chierici regolari detti Teatini" (2 vols., Rome, 1780), which formed the basis of the "Bibliotheca Teatina" of P. Silvos.
