= Santa Margherita di Belice =

- Comune
- Comune di Santa Margherita di Belice
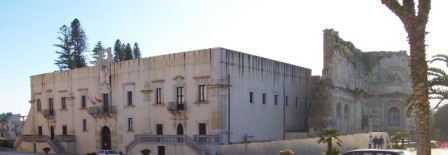
- Remains of the Mother Church (right) and the Palazzo Gattopardo

- Coat of arms

- Location within Italy Location within Sicily
- Coordinates: 37°41′N 13°1′E
- Country: Italy
- Region: Sicily
- Province: Agrigento (AG)

Government
  - Mayor: Francesco Valenti

Area
  - Total: 67.28 km^{2} (25.98 sq mi)
- Elevation: 400 m (1,300 ft)

Population (31 December 2016)
  - Total: 6,386
  - Density: 94.92/km^{2} (245.8/sq mi)
- Demonym: Margheritesi
- Time zone: UTC+1 (CET)
  - Summer (DST): UTC+2 (CEST)
- Postal code: 92018
- Dialing code: 0925
- Website: Official website

Santa Margherita di Belice (Sicilian: Santa Margarita) is a town in the Province of Agrigento in the Italian region of Sicily. It lies in southwest Sicily, 400 metres (1,300 ft) above sea level, near where the borders of the province of Agrigento, Province of Trapani and Province of Palermo meet. It is approximately 60 kilometres (37 mi) southwest of the city of Palermo, 60 kilometres (37 mi) northwest of the city of Agrigento and sits in the Belice valley among the rivers Belice, Senore and Carboj.

== History ==
In this territory there is evidence of settlements and remains of Sicanians, Greeks and Romans, and the town had once been a mountaintop stronghold of Berbers and later of Arab civilization. It is only thanks to them in this area who made the foundations of the hamlet "Casale of Manzil-Sindi" (named after their leader, Muhammed-ibi-as-Sindi).

Afterwards with the arrival of the Normans, the territory of Casale Manzil-Sindi was named "Misilindino" or "Misirindino", then it became part of the feudal estate of a Spanish nobleman, Baron Antonio de Corbera, responsible for the first built-up area in 1572. Only in 1610 King Filippo III, releasing the "licentia populandi", authorized Baron Girolano Corbera, Baron Antonio's nephew, to establish the new village, who named it Santa Margherita, with an ambitious architectural program, the most spectacular result of which was the Palazzo Filangeri-Cutò built around 1680. The princes Filangeri, who succeeded the barons Corbera, gave impetus to the village by construction of several buildings and increasing the population. Among Filangeri of Santa Margherita di Belìce are included three viceroys of Sicily: Alessandro I, Alessandro II, and Nicolò I. In 1812 for about three months, Nicolo I hosted King Ferdinando, Queen Maria Carolina (the Donnafugata) and Prince Leopoldo di Borbone in the Palazzo of Santa Margherita.

During the night of 15 January 1968, a violent and massive earthquake devastated Santa Margherita di Belice and the surrounding town in the Belice river area, forever changing the lifestyle of its inhabitants. A new town was built adjacent to the old town. Many of the damaged structures from the earthquake are still standing, including the ruined palace of Giuseppe Tomasi di Lampedusa and the Palazzo Filangeri-Cutò. The author immortalized the palace in his novel, The Leopard, under the name Donnafugata.

== Main sights ==
- Palazzo Filangeri di Cutò, best known as Palazzo Gattopardo. Only the façade survived the 1968 earthquake, and now has been partially rebuilt. It is currently home of the municipality, of the Gattopardo Museum, the St. Alexander Theatre and of the Literary Park Giuseppe Tomasi di Lampedusa.
- Museum of the Memory, located in the remains of the former Mother Church. It houses historical photos about the Belice valley towns.
- Villa del Gattopardo, dating to the late 17th century and described by Tomasi di Lampedusa in his novel, I Ricordi d'Infanzia.
