= Giuseppe Samonà =

Italian architect (1898–1983)

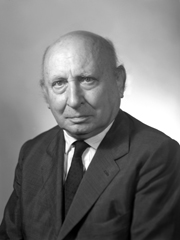
Giuseppe Samonà

Giuseppe Samonà (1898–1983) was an Italian architect and urban planner, whose notable works include the post office in the Appio quarter of Rome (built 1933–6), the Banca d'Italia in Padua (1968) and a theatre in Sciacca, Sicily (1974–9).

He also served as director of the Istituto Universitario di Architettura in Venice from 1945 to 1971.

Italian Hispanist and author Carmelo Samonà was his son.
