= Gioacchino Lanza Tomasi =

Italian musicologist (1934–2023)

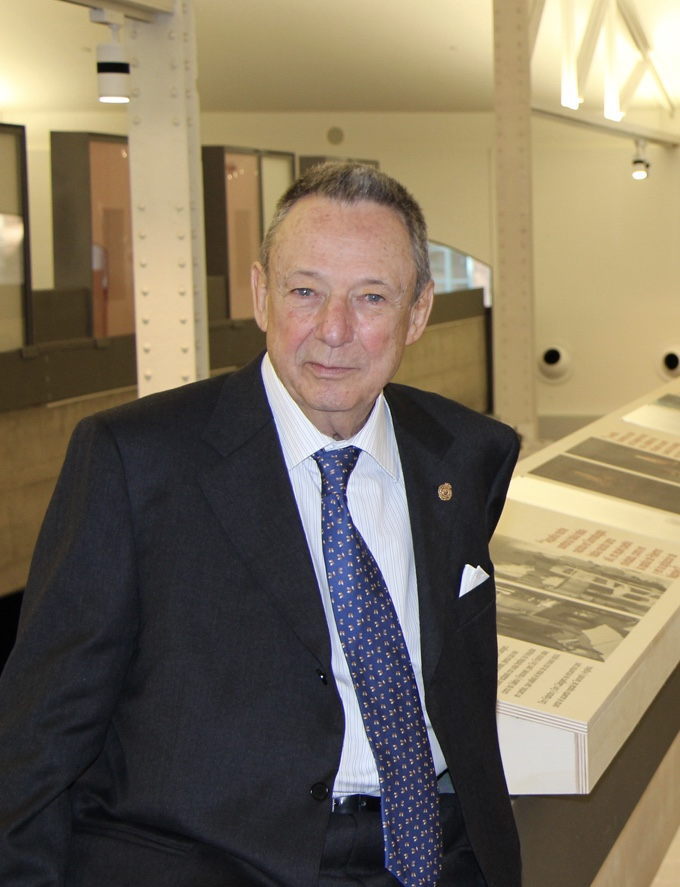
- Born: 11 February 1934; Rome, Italy
- Died: 10 May 2023 (aged 89); Palermo, Italy

Gioacchino Lanza Tomasi (born Gioacchino Lanza Branciforte Ramirez; 11 February 1934 – 10 May 2023) was an Italian musicologist and academic. He directed a number of cultural institutions, including the Teatro di San Carlo, the Teatro dell'Opera di Roma, and the Istituto Italiano di Cultura in New York.

After his adoption by his cousin Giuseppe Tomasi di Lampedusa, the famous novelist and last generation of the Princes of Lampedusa, Lanza Tomasi bore the courtesy title Duke of Palma di Montechiaro.

== Life and career ==
Born in Rome, Lanza Tomasi was a distant cousin and the adoptive son of novelist Giuseppe Tomasi di Lampedusa, best known for the novel The Leopard. He started his career as a music critic of the newspaper L'Ora. He served as artistic director for a number of cultural institutions, notably the Philharmonics of Rome and Palermo, the RAI National Symphony Orchestra, the Teatro di San Carlo, the Teatro dell'Opera di Roma, the Teatro Massimo and the Teatro Comunale di Bologna. He also directed the Istituto Italiano di Cultura in New York, wrote numerous books, and served as professor of History of Music at the Salerno and Palermo universities. He died in Palermo on 10 May 2023, at the age of 89.
