= Palazzo Filangeri-Cutò, Santa Margherita di Belice =

Baroque palaces in Santa Margherita Belice, Italy

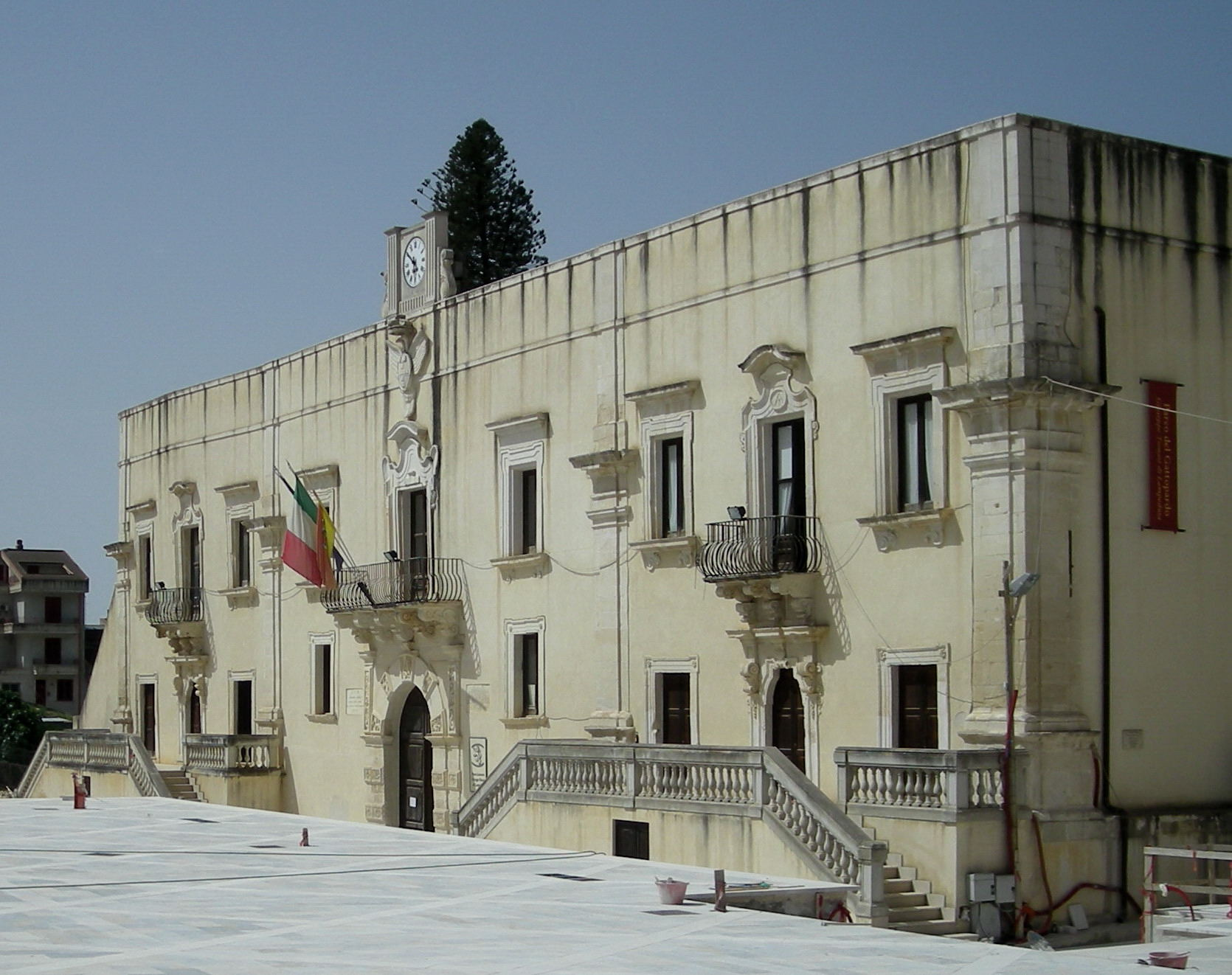

The Palazzo Filangeri-Cutò was a palace built in the 17th century by the Corberas, a noble family of Spanish origin, in the small Sicilian town of Santa Margherita di Belice. The palace provided the setting for Giuseppe Tomasi di Lampedusa's celebrated novel The Leopard, which traced the evolution of Sicilian aristocracy in the 19th century.

The palace along with much of the town was severely damaged in a series of earthquakes in 1968; in recent years efforts have been made to restore the palace grounds.

== History and description ==
The locality became part of the feudal estate of a Spanish nobleman, Baron Antonio de Corbera, in the late 14th century. In the 17th century the Corbera family embarked on an ambitious architectural program, the most spectacular result of which was the Palazzo Filangeri-Cutò, built around 1680.

The 20th century aristocrat and novelist, Giuseppe Tomasi di Lampedusa, who spent his childhood summers at the palace, gave a description of it in his memoir Places of My Infancy:

Set in the middle of the town, right on a leafy square, it spread over a vast expanse and contained about a hundred rooms, large and small. It gave the impression of an enclosed and self-sufficient entity, a kind of Vatican as it were, that included state-rooms, living-rooms, quarters for thirty guests, servants' rooms, three enormous courtyards, stables and coach-houses, a private theatre and church, a large and very lovely garden, and a great orchard.

Prince Niccolò had had the good taste, almost unique for his time, not to ruin the 18th century salons...

"Prince Niccolò" was the novelist's great-great-grandfather, Niccolò Filangeri, 7th Prince of Cutò and Prince of Satriano, Duke of San Martino and della Fabbrica (1760-1839). The palace became known as the Palazzo Filangeri di Cutò after he inherited and restored it.

The entrance hall was lined in a double row with portraits—dating as far back as the 1080s—of Tomasi di Lampedusa's ancestors. In the 18th century one of those ancestors, Niccolò's father, Alessandro Filangieri, 6th Prince of Cutò (1740-1806) had the palace grounds planted with exotic species such as palms, bamboo and orange trees, and balls were held in the grounds at night around a large fountain. The fountain itself was kept stocked with Belice River eels for the Prince's table.

In 1812–13, the Palazzo became host for three months to the exiled Queen Maria Carolina of Naples and Sicily, elder sister of the French Queen Marie Antoinette.

Later the palazzo was the residence of the "Leopard" himself, Alessandro III Filangeri, 8th Prince of Cutò (1802-1854), last minister of the last King of the Two Sicilies, on whom his great-grandson, Giuseppe Tomasi di Lampedusa, patterned the protagonist of the famous novel.

Alessandro III Filangeri had no sons. Eventually the palazzo passed on to his grandson (by his only daughter Giovanna Nicoletta, 9th Principessa di Cutò), Alessandro Mastrogiovanni-Tasca-Filangeri, 10th Prince of Cutò (1874-1942). (Lampedusa's mother, Beatrice Mastrogiovanni-Tasca di Cutò (1870-1946), was this man's older sister.)

In the latter part of the 20th century the Palazzo was sold, and the new owners sought to capitalize on their purchase by putting up for sale some of its historic fittings, including old paintings cut from ceiling panels. In 1963, the palace provided the setting for some scenes in Luchino Visconti's award-winning film adaptation of di Lampedusa's novel, also named The Leopard.

== Destruction ==
In January 1968, a destructive earthquake sequence devastated Santa Margherita, and many of the town's historic buildings were destroyed or severely damaged. The Palazzo Filangeri-Cutò was almost totally destroyed, with only part of its facade remaining. The town was subsequently abandoned by its 6,000 or so residents, and a new town built for them adjacent to the old one.

Although the old town is now largely uninhabitable, much of it is still standing and it remains a tourist attraction. In recent years, the government formally recognized the old town's value in this regard by restoring the historic grounds of the Palazzo Filangeri-Cutò to their original plan.
