= Giuseppe Maria Tomasi =

17th and 18th-century Italian Roman Catholic cardinal and saint

Saint–Duke Giuseppe Maria Tomasi CR
- Cardinal-Priest of Santi Silvestro e Martino ai Monti; Duke of Palma (di Montechiaro)
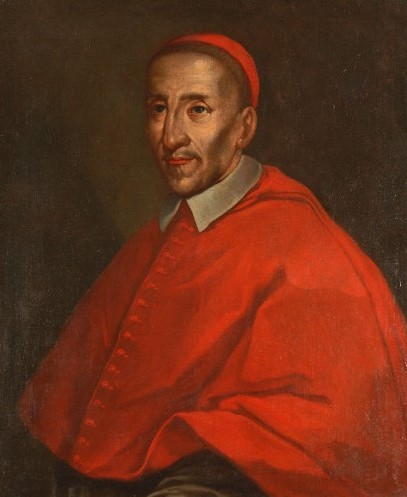
- Native name: Giuseppe Maria Tomasi di Lampedusa
- Appointed: 11 July 1712
- Installed: 11 July 1712
- Term ended: 1 January 1713
- Predecessor: Marcello d'Aste
- Successor: Niccolò Caracciolo

Orders
- Ordination: 23 December 1673 by Giacomo de Angelis
- Created cardinal: 18 May 1712 by Pope Clement XI
- Rank: Cardinal-Priest

Personal details
- Born: Giuseppe Maria Tomasi; 12 September 1649 Licata, Kingdom of Sicily, Crown of Aragon
- Died: 1 January 1713 (aged 63) Rome, Lazio, Papal States
- Buried: Basilica of Sant'Andrea della Valle, Rome, Papal States
- Denomination: Roman Catholic
- Parents: Giulio Tomasi di Lampedusa & Rosalia Traina

Sainthood
- Feast day: 1 January; 3 January (Theatines)
- Venerated in: Roman Catholic Church
- Beatified: 29 September 1803 by Pope Pius VII
- Canonized: 12 October 1986 by Pope John Paul II
- Attributes: Cardinal's attire
- Patronage: Catholic liturgy
- Shrines: Basilica of Sant'Andrea della Valle, Rome, Italy

Joseph Mary Tomasi CR (Italian: Giuseppe Maria Tomasi di Lampedusa; 12 September 1649 – 1 January 1713), also known as the "Saint Duke", was an Italian Catholic priest, scholar, reformer and cardinal as well as a member of the princely Tomasi family. His scholarship was a significant source of the reforms in the liturgy of the Catholic Church during the 20th century. He was a member of the Theatines.

Tomasi was beatified by Pope Pius VII in 1803, and canonized by Pope John Paul II in 1986.

== Life ==
=== Early life ===
Tomasi was born at Licata, in the Kingdom of Sicily, part of the Crown of Aragon, to Giulio Tomasi, the first Prince of Lampedusa and his wife, Rosalia Traina. His life was oriented toward God from his first years. Formed and educated in the family home, where they did not lack riches or moral training, he gave proof of a spirit very open to study and to piety. His parents cared greatly for this and for his own Christian formation and his instruction in the classical and modern languages, above all in the Spanish language, because he was destined by the family for the royal court of Madrid, as he was bound to inherit from his own father, as his title of nobility, that of Grandee of Spain.

But Tomasi's own spirit aspired, even from youth, to be small in the Kingdom of God, and to serve not the kings of the earth but the King of heaven. He cultivated his pious desire in his heart until he obtained the consent of his father to follow his vocation to religious life.

=== Theatine ===
After having renounced, by means of a notarized document, the principality which belonged to him by birth, in favour of his younger brother, as well as his very large inheritance, Tomasi was admitted into the Theatines, a religious Order founded by St. Cajetan of Tiene in 1524, as a reform movement in the Catholic Church, and noted for the simplicity of life followed by its members. He joined the Order on 24 March 1665, and finally made his religious profession in the Theatine house of St. Joseph in Palermo, on 25 March 1666.

Tomasi then studied philosophy, first at Messina, and later, owing to poor health, at Ferrara and Modena, and then theology, in Rome and Palermo. He was ordained a priest on Christmas Day 1673. To a wide knowledge of Greek, he added the study of Ethiopic, Arabic, Syriac, Aramaic and Hebrew, and converted his teacher, a Jewish rabbi, to Christianity. From the Psalters in these different languages, he collected the titles of the Psalms. He devoted himself to the study of Scripture and the Fathers. Searching the chief libraries, archives, and monuments, he retraced the ancient ecclesiastical discipline and liturgy.

Urged on by his particular love for the ancient documents of the Church and for sound ecclesiastical traditions, Tomasi considered that a good part of his own religious growth lay in dedicating himself, with the spirit of faith, to the publication of rare liturgical books and of the ancient liturgical texts, thereby bringing to light many ancient texts which until then had been hidden in the libraries.

=== Reformer ===
Tomasi's efforts at reform were directed not to the introduction of the new, but to the restoration and maintenance of the old. He was not always upheld and was sometimes rebuked for his zeal. Pope Innocent XII made him examiner of the bishops, or of the clergy. Pope Clement XI, for whom he served as confessor, appointed him consultor of the Theatine Order, theologian of the Sacred Congregation for Consultations about Regulars and other offices of the Holy See, consultor of the Sacred Congregation of Rites, and qualificator of the Holy Office. The same pope created him Cardinal Priest, with the title of the Church of Santi Silvestro e Martino ai Monti, commanding him to accept the honour.

Tomasi taught catechism to the children of the poor in his titular church, also introducing its congregants to the use of Gregorian chant. He died in 1713, mourned by all, especially by Pope Clement, who so admired his sanctity that he had consulted him before accepting the papacy. He was buried in his titular church. The relics of his body, transferred in 1971 from the Basilica of his title of Ss. Silvestro e Martini ai Monti, are presently exposed for the veneration of the faithful in the Basilica of San Andrea della Valle of the Theatine Fathers, in Rome.

== Works ==
Tomasi's many publications on liturgical subjects, in which piety was united with scholarship, motivated the titles which some of his contemporaries gave to him, those of "the Prince of the Roman Liturgists" and of "Liturgists" and of "Liturgical Doctor".

In truth, not a few of the norms, established by the authority of the Roman Pontiffs and by the documents of the Second Vatican Council and today in use in the Church, were already proposed and ardently desired by Tomasi, including:

- the present-day form of the Liturgy of the Hours
- the distinction and use of the Missal and of the Lectionary in the celebration of the Eucharist
- various norms contained in the Roman Pontifical and in the Roman Ritual
- the use of the vernacular instead of Latin outside of the sacred liturgy, which he himself recommended for private devotions and for the prayers made in common by the faithful outside.

All these were intended to promote a more intimate and personal participation of the people in the celebration of the liturgy.

In his writings against freemasonry, Pope Benedict XIV referred to a prayer inserted by Tomasi into the "Mass against slanderers" asking for the grace "not to heed the calumnies of perverse minds".

Tomasi's works (Codici Tommasiani), published chiefly from ancient codices in the Vatican and Vallicellian Libraries and the Library of Christina of Sweden, were praised by the academies of Europe. Chief among his publications are the Codices sacramentorum nongentis annis antiquiores (Rome, 1680), partly transcribed by Mabillon in his Liturgia Gallicana. Following these, in order of time, were: Psalterium (Rouse, 1683), according to the Roman and Gallican editions, published under the names Giuseppe Maria Caro and J. M. Carus. In this work Tomasi introduced Origen's symbols, (obeli and asterisks), obsolete for nine centuries.

Under the same pen-name, Tomasi wrote Responsalia et Antiphonaria Rom. Eccl., etc. (Rome, 1686); Sacrorum Bibliorum Tituli, sive capitula (Rome, 1688); Antiqui libri Missarum Rom. Eccl. or the antiphonary of Pope Gregory I, entitled "Comes", written by Alcuin at the order of Charlemagne (Rome, 1691); Officium Domicinae Passionis, used by the Greek Orthodox Church on Good Friday, translated into Latin (Rome, 1695).

Under his own name, Tomasi published Speculum (Rome, 1679); Exercitium Fidei, Spei et Caritatis (Rome, 1683); Breviarium psalterii (Rome, 1683); Vera norma di glorificar Dio (Rome, 1687); Fermentum (Rome, 1688); Psalterium cum canticis (Rome, 1697); Indiculus institutionum theologicarum veterurn Patrum ( 3 vols., Rome, 1709, 1710; 1712), an exposition of theological theory and practice, derived from original patristic sources.

Tomasi also wrote numerous opuscula, the last four published by G. Mercati (Rome, 1905). In 1753, Antonio Francesco Vezzosi published his works in 11 quarto volumes.

== Sources ==
- Herbermann, Charles, ed. (1913). "Bl. Giuseppe Maria Tommasi". Catholic Encyclopedia. New York: Robert Appleton Company.
- Biography at The Cardinals of the Holy Roman Church
