= Francesco Orlando (critic) =

Francesco Orlando (July 2, 1934 – June 22, 2010) was an Italian literary critic, essayist and university professor who specialized in French literature.

== Life ==
=== Childhood and adolescence ===
Francesco Orlando was born in Palermo to a wealthy family: his father, Camille Orlando, was a lawyer and the grandson of Vittorio Emanuele Orlando, President of the Italian Council. Following the onset of WWII, the Orlando family was forced to move to a country home near Terrasini, where Orlando began his studies. In 1943, following the American arrival in Sicily, his family returned to Palermo where the young Orlando attended Jesuit secondary school before ultimately studying at the public secondary school. These secondary-school years were formative for Orlando's intellectual development; he became interested in music, literature and theatre. In addition, Orlando's family environment was stimulating, they often hosted musical evenings in which the young Francesco was asked to perform on the piano and sing. Through his father's substantial library, he was able to explore a wide range of topics: indeed, at the age of 15, he published a translation of Victor Hugo's Hernani.

=== University training and career ===
After completing a degree in Law at the University of Palermo, Orlando followed in his father's footsteps and changed course by undertaking studies in Literature 1955. Through Baron Pietro Sgàdari di Lo Monaco, Orlando makes the acquaintance of the Prince and Sicilian writer Giuseppe Tomasi di Lampedusa. He joined Tomasi's literary circle, where he received lessons in English, English Literature and French Literature. It was at this time that he is introduced to psychoanalysis through his tutor's wife, Alexandra Wolff Stomersee, a student of Sigmund Freud.

Following a meeting with Angelo Pizzorusso, a Professor at the University of Pisa who made note of his potential, Orlando became his student and specializes in French literature. His studies culminated in his first scholarly work, L'opera di Louis Ramond, dedicated to geologist, botanist and French explorer Louis Ramond de Carbonnières. In 1959, Orlando was awarded a scholarship to study in Paris, where he worked on a thesis titled Rotrou dalla tragicommedia alla tragedia, which constituted an important contribution to studies on French baroque theater.

In 1967, he became professor of French literature in the Department of Literature and Foreign Languages at the University of Pisa. During the events of May 1968, he appeared in support of the student effort, yet remained in favor of academic activities continuing at their regular pace; he asked that disturbances to the academic calendar be limited. Following this time, around 1970, he petitioned for a transfer to the University of Naples Federico II, but maintained close collaboration with Pisa until his move to the Ca' Foscari University of Venice in 1975.

In 1971, he published Lettura freudiana della "Phèdre", a course taught at the University of Pisa delineating the first volume of his Freudian cycle. The logical and formal rereading of the Freudian text, as a textual analysis tool applied to literature, and the confrontation with structural linguistics and semiotics garner him international recognition.

He moved back to Pisa in 1982 and resumed his former position as Professor of Literature at the University of Pisa, where he became, in 1994, the first professor to teach a course on Literary Theory in Italy.

In 1993, Giulio Einaudi editore published Gli oggetti desueti nelle immagini della letteratura, translated into English as "Obsolete objects in the literary imagination: ruins, relics, rarities, rubbish, uninhabited places, and hidden treasures" and published by the Yale University Press in 2006.

Orlando retired from his university career in 2004, but pursues continued research in literature and published his first novel, titled La doppia seduzione.

He died in Pisa in 2010.

== Obsolete objects in the literary imagination: ruins, relics, rarities, rubbish, uninhabited places, and hidden treasures ==
Obsolete objects in the literary imagination: ruins, relics, rarities, rubbish, uninhabited places, and hidden treasures, text first published in Italian in 1993, is considered Francesco Orlando's magnum opus. Therein, he posits that the theoretical effort of defining literature is analogous to the passionate reading of texts in the Western tradition, from Antiquity to the 19th century.

The theoretical crux of the books is faithful to the ambivalent orlandian view of time: time destroys or valorizes, but also destroys and valorizes. According to Orlando, this fundamental ambivalence is an anthropological constant for humankind, one that can be emphasized through literature, as this medium has the right to consider the representation of useless and disgusting objects, while also rejecting their esthetic value. The proliferation of this type of literary images, according to Orlando's perspective, testifies to a critique of existing expectations of order, efficiency and functionality typical of bourgeois society.

== Published works ==
- La foresta è tutta del sole. 1949-1954, poetry, S.F. Flaccovio editore, 1954
- L'opera di Louis Ramond, Feltrinelli, 1960
- Routrou dalla tragicommedia alla tragedia, Bottega d'Erasmo, 1963
- Ricordo di Lampedusa, All'insegna del pesce d'oro, 1963; 1985
- Per una teoria freudiana della letteratura, Einaudi, 1965; 1973, 1987, 1992
- Infanzia, memoria e storia da Rousseau ai romantici, Liviana, 1966; Pacini, 2007
- Proust, Sainte-Beuve e la ricerca in direzione sbagliata, in Critica e storia letteraria: studi offerti a Mario Fubini, Liviana, 1970
- Lettura freudiana della « Phèdre », Einaudi, 1971; Due letture freudiane: Fedra e il Misantropo, 1980; 1990
- Introduzione a Sigmund Freud, Il motto di spirito e la sua relazione con l'inconscio, Boringhieri, 1975
- Lettura freudiana del Misanthrope e due scritti teorici, Einaudi, 1979; 1990
- Illuminismo e retorica freudiana, Einaudi, 1982; Illuminismo, barocco e retorica freudiana, 1997
- « Rhétorique des Lumières et dénégation freudienne », Poétique, n° 41, février 1980, pp. 78–89
- Le costanti e le varianti : studi di letteratura francese e di teatro musicale, Il Mulino, 1983
- « Freud and Literature. Eleven Ways He Did It », in Poetics, 1984
- « Letteratura e psicanalisi: alla ricerca dei modelli freudiani », in Letteratura italiana, IV, L’interpretazione, Torino, Einaudi, 1985, pp. 549–587
- Gli oggetti desueti nelle immagini della letteratura. Rovine, reliquie, rarità, robaccia, luoghi inabitati e tesori nascosti, Einaudi, 1993; 1994, 2010, Yale University Press; 2006, preface by Carlo Ginzburg
- Introduzione a William Beckford, Vathek : racconto arabo, Marsilio, 1996
- L'altro che è in noi : arte e nazionalità, Bollati Boringhieri, 1996
- Ricordo di Lampedusa (1962) suivi de Da distanze diverse (1996), Bollati Boringhieri, 1996; 2001
- Introduzione a Mario Praz, La carne, la morte e il diavolo nella letteratura romantica, Sansoni, 1996
- L'intimità e la storia : lettura del Gattopardo, Einaudi, 1998
- Cura del convegno e degli atti di Giuseppe Tomasi di Lampedusa, cento anni dalla nascita, quaranta dal Gattopardo, Palerme, Palais Chiaramonte, 12, 13 et 14 décembre 1996, Assessorato alla cultura, 1999
- Statuti del soprannaturale nella narrativa, in Franco Moretti (direction), Il romanzo, vol. I (La cultura del romanzo), Einaudi, 2001
- La doppia seduzione, Einaudi, 2010 (roman)

=== English translations ===
- Toward a Freudian Theory of Literature: with an Analysis of Racine's « Phèdre », trans. by Charmaine Lee, Baltimore, Johns Hopkins University Press, 1978
- Obsolete Objects in the Literary Imagination: Ruins, Relics, Rarities, Rubbish, Uninhabited Places, and Hidden Treasures, trans. by Gabriel Pihas and Daniel Seidel, in collaboration with Alessandra Grego; preface by David Quint, New Haven, Yale University Press, 2006

=== French translations ===
- Lecture freudienne de « Phèdre », trans. by Danièle and Thomas Aron, Paris, Les Belles Lettres, 1986
- Un souvenir de Lampedusa (1962) followed by A distances multiples (1996), trans. by Michel Balzamo, Paris, l'Inventaire, 1996
- Les objets désuets dans l'imagination littéraire: ruines, reliques, raretés, rebuts, lieux inhabités et trésors cachés, trans. by Paul-André et Aurélie Claudel, Paris, Garnier, 2010
- L'Intimité et l'Histoire: lecture du « Guépard », trans. by Chetro De Carolis, Paris, Garnier, 2014

=== Prefaces ===
- Sigmund Freud, Il motto di spirito e la sua relazione con l'inconscio (Der Witz und seine Beziehung zum Unbewussten), trans. by S. Daniele et E. Sagittario, Torino, Bollati Boringhieri, 1975
- Carmelo Samonà, Fratelli e tutta l'opera narrativa, Mondadori, 2002
- 'Il vero in maschera: dialogismi galileiani. Idee e forme nelle prose scientifiche del Seicento by Emanuele Zinato, Liguori, 2003
- Racconti, facezie, libelli by Voltaire, Gianni Iotti's edition, Einaudi, 2004
- Corrispondenza con la madre (1887-1905) by Marcel Proust, Rocco Carabba, 2010
- Marcel Proust, Contro Sainte-Beuve, trans. from French by M. Bertini and P. Sarini, Torino, Einaudi, 1974

== Bibliography ==
- Stefano Brugnolo, Davide Ragone (direction), Francesco Fiorentino, Gianni Iotti, Luciano Pellegrini, Sergio Zatti, Andrea Accardi, Guido Accascina, Roberto Andò, Alberto Arosio, Valentino Baldi, Anna Benedetti, Mariolina Bertini, Piero Boitani, Antonio Carlini, Alberto Casadei, Alberto Castoldi, Federico Corradi, Emiliano Dalle Piagge, Raffaele Donnarumma, Lucia Faedo, Gianfranco Ferraro, Giulio Ferroni, Chiara Frugoni, Massimo Fusillo, Matilde Gagliardo, Antonio Gargano, Marina Gigli, Alessandra Ginzburg, Carlo Ginzburg, Michele Girardi, Francesco Giuntini, André Guyaux, Alfonso Maurizio Iacono, Anthony Johnson, Fabien Kunz-Vitali, Salvatore La Francesca, Sergio Landucci, Carlo Lauro, Mario Lavagetto, Vincenzo Letta, Romano Luperini, Albina Maffioli, Giacomo Magrini, Franco Marenco, Luigi Marinelli, Ferdinando Mazzarella, Guido Mazzoni, Liana Nissim, Roberto Pagano, Giuseppe Panella, Giovanni Paoletti, Beatrice Pasqualino Gagliardo, Pierluigi Pellini, Arnaldo Pizzorusso, Giulia Poggi, Aurelio Principato, Adriano Prosperi, Matteo Residori, Luigi Rizzi, Emilio Sala, Giuseppe A. Samonà, Anna Maria Scaiola, Cesare Segre, Salvatore Settis, Andrea Settis Frugoni, Danilo Soscia, Alfredo Stussi, Piero Toffano, Paolo Tortonese, Pietro Vichi, Andrea Vignali, Enrica Villari, Gabriella Violato, Giuseppe Zaccagnini et Emanuele Zinato, Per Francesco Orlando. Testimonianze e ricordi, ETS, 2012
- Thomas Aron, « Présentation de Francesco Orlando », Semen, 1983
- Ginzburg, Carlo, Safran, Yehuda, Sherer Daniel. "An Interview with Carlo Ginzburg, by Yehuda Safran and Daniel Sherer." Potlatch 5 (2022), special issue on Carlo Ginzburg. Extensive discussion of Francesco Orlando.
- Gianni Iotti, voix du Dizionario Biografico degli Italiani, LXXIX, Roma, Treccani, 2013
- Massimo Colella, Gianfranco Contini e Francesco Orlando: un’idea di Dante, un’idea della letteratura, in «Xenia. Trimestrale di Letteratura e Cultura» (Genova), IV, 3, 2019, pp. 20–32.
