= Stāmeriena Palace =

Palace in Latvia

Coordinates: 57.2159°N 26.8994°E

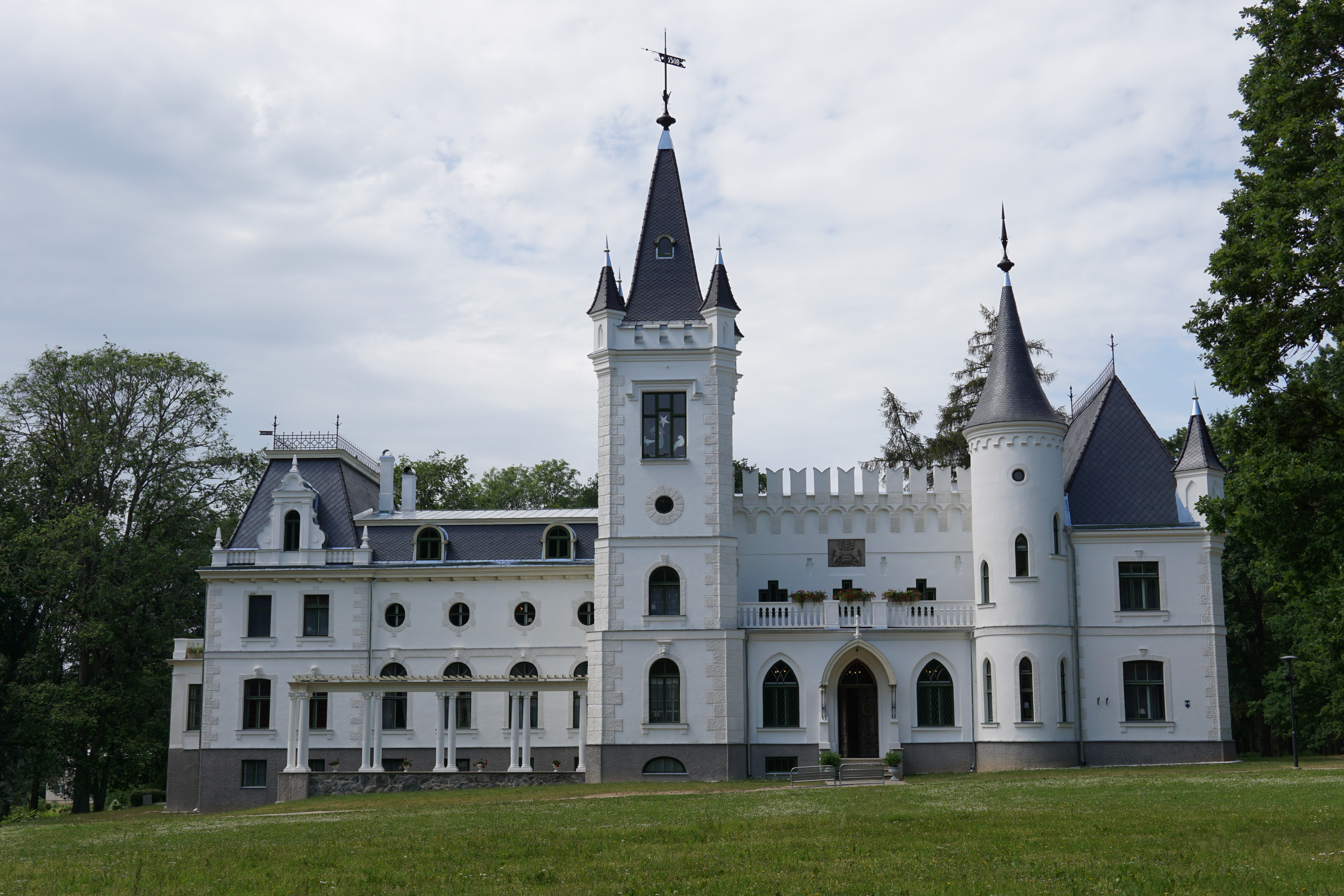
- Interactive map of the Stāmeriena Palace area

General information
- Architectural style: Neo-Classicism, Art Nouveau
- Location: Gulbene Municipality, Latvia
- Construction started: Beginning of the 19th. century.
- Completed: 1908
- Client: Johann Gottlieb von Wolff (1756-1817)

Stāmeriena Palace (Latvian: Stāmerienas muižas pils; German: Schloss Stomersee) is a palace built in Historicist style from 1835 to 1843 in the Stāmeriena Parish of Gulbene Municipality, in the Vidzeme region of Latvia. Its first owner was Johann Gottlieb von Wolff (1756-1817) and subsequently his descendants.

In 1905, during the Russian Revolution, the manor was burned down, but was later renewed by Baron Boris von Wolff (1850-1917) in 1908. Although it was rebuilt in a different style, it is considered one of the brightest architectural achievements of his time in French Neo-Renaissance style in Latvia. Stāmeriena palace was one of the few manors which were not nationalized after Latvian agrarian reforms in the 1920s. So the von Wolff family continued to live there through the 1930s until 1939. The palace was presented as a gift to Andrei Pilar von Pilchau, the first - and homosexual - husband of the palace's owner Alexandra von Wolff-Stomersee (1894-1982). Her second husband, the Sicilian writer Giuseppe Tomasi di Lampedusa, also lived in the Stāmeriena palace for a few years in the 1930s after their marriage in 1932.

After the Second World War a technical school of agriculture was located in the palace. Later it was used as the administration building of the local state-owned farm (sovkhoz). After 1992 the palace stood empty for six years, then in 1998 it became a private property and since then the palace and landscape park around it are being restored and open to visitors.

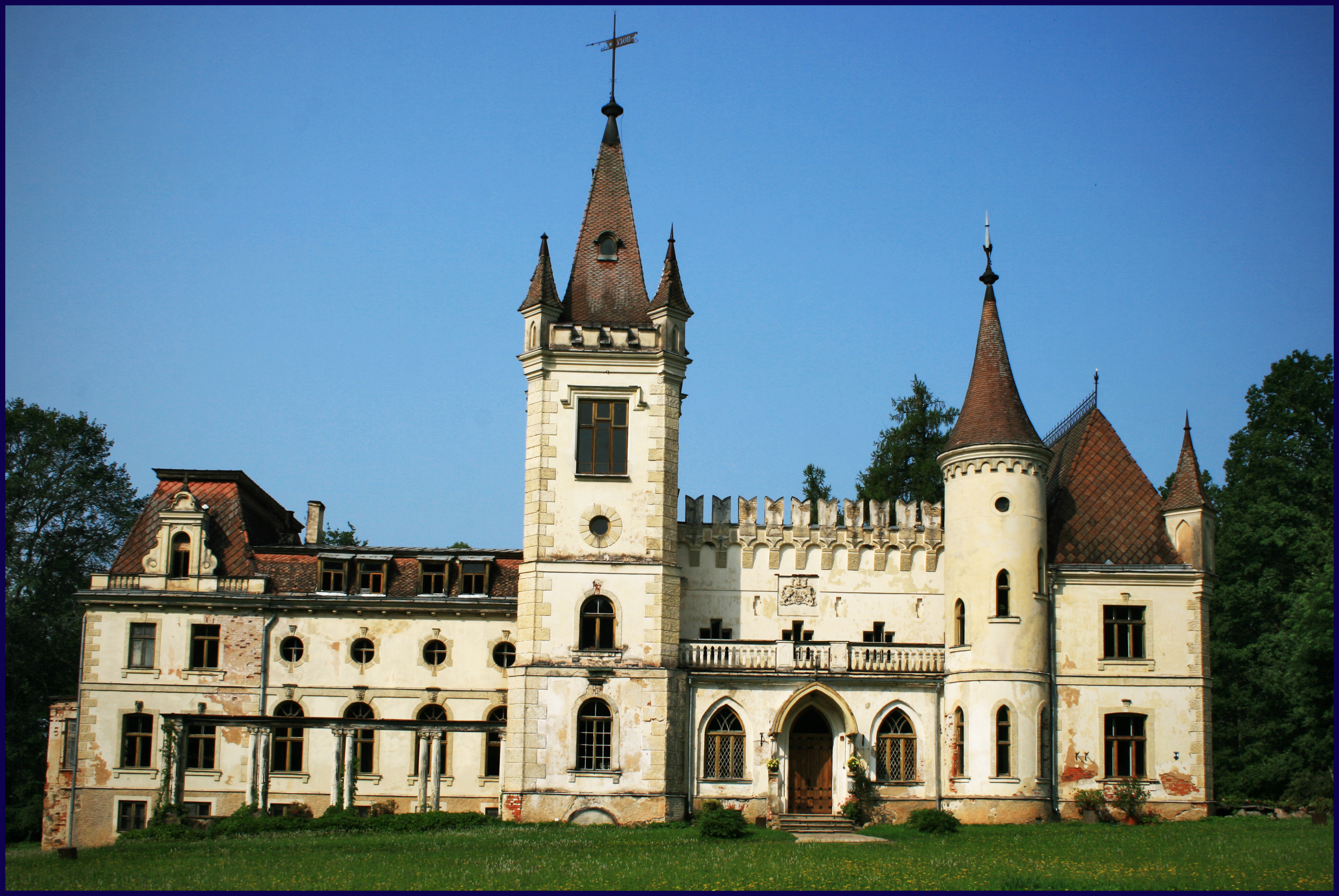
Stāmeriena Palace before its restoration

== See also ==
- List of palaces and manor houses in Latvia
