= Pietro Tomasi della Torretta =

Italian politician and diplomat (1873–1962)

Don Pietro Tomasi Prince of Lampedusa Duke of Palma di Montechiaro Grandee of Spain
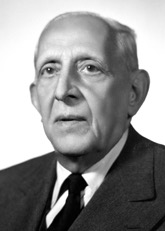

President of the Senate
- In office 20 July 1944 – 25 June 1946
- Monarch: Victor Emmanuel III
- Preceded by: Paolo Thaon di Revel
- Succeeded by: Ivanoe Bonomi

Minister of Foreign Affairs
- In office 4 July 1921 – 22 February 1922
- Prime Minister: Ivanoe Bonomi
- Preceded by: Ivanoe Bonomi
- Succeeded by: Carlo Schanzer

Personal details
- Born: 7 April 1873
- Died: 4 December 1962 (aged 89)
- Party: Independent

Pietro Paolo Tomasi (7 April 1873 – 4 December 1962), known as Pietro Tomasi della Torretta after his courtesy title marchese della Torretta, was an Italian politician and diplomat. From 1922 to 1927, he served as the Ambassador of Italy to the United Kingdom and from 20 July 1944 until his resignation on 25 June 1946, he served as President of the Senate. Inheriting the family titles from his nephew, Giuseppe Tomasi di Lampedusa, he was the 12th Prince of Lampedusa (as well as the last).

== Biography ==
Born in Palermo, the younger son of Don Giuseppe Tomasi, then Duke of Palma di Montechiaro and later 9th Prince of Lampedusa (1838–1908) and Stefania Papè, Tomasi earned a degree in jurisprudence but quickly took up a diplomatic career. As a younger son from 1885 (then age 22) of a Prince of Lampedusa, Tomasi became entitled to be known by courtesy as the marchese della Torretta, hence Tomasi della Torretta or simply Della Torretta.

From 1910 to 1914, Della Torretta led the cabinet of the Italian Minister of Foreign Affairs, Antonino di San Giuliano. Just after the latter's death, in May 1913 Della Torretta was sent to Munich as Italian plenipotentiary in the days preceding the outbreak of World War I. He was also Ambassador to Petrograd 1917-1919 and served in the Italian delegation at the 1919 Paris Peace Conference. From 1921–1922 he was Minister of Foreign Affairs in the cabinet of Ivanoe Bonomi, having been elected as Senator of the Kingdom in 1921. He was Italian ambassador to the United Kingdom in the years 1922-1927.

Hostile to Fascism from the beginning of Benito Mussolini's government, Della Torretta became President of the Italian Senate on 20 July 1944, after the Fascist regime collapsed. In 1957, Della Torretta inherited the family title from his nephew, the famous novelist Giuseppe Tomasi di Lampedusa, who had died childless, and upon his own death in 1962, also having had no children, the Sicilian branch of the pan-Italian Tomasi family became extinct.

== Titles ==
Arms of the Tomasi Princes of Lampedusa

His full title was:

Don Pietro Tomasi, 12th Prince of Lampedusa, 13th Duke of Palma, 14th Baron of Montechiaro, Marquess and Baron of Torretta, and Grandee of Spain of the First Class.

Political offices
Preceded by Ivanoe Bonomi	Italian Minister of Foreign Affairs; 1921–1922	Succeeded by Carlo Schanzer
Preceded by Paolo Thaon di Revel	President of the Italian Senate; 1944–1946	Succeeded by Ivanoe Bonomi (after a two-year vacancy)
