= Lucio Piccolo =

Italian poet (1901–1969)

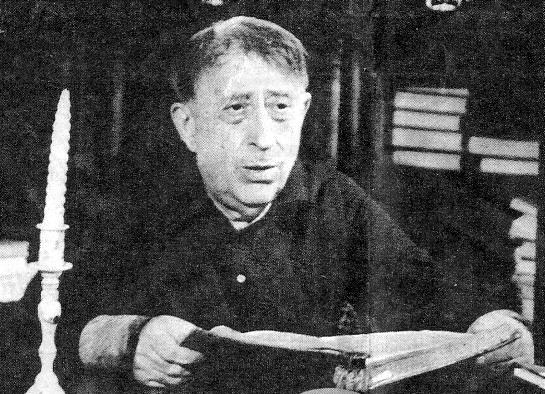
Lucio Piccolo in his studio

Lucio Piccolo di Calanovella (October 27, 1901 in Palermo – May 26, 1969 in Capo d'Orlando) was an Italian poet and esotericist.

== Biography ==
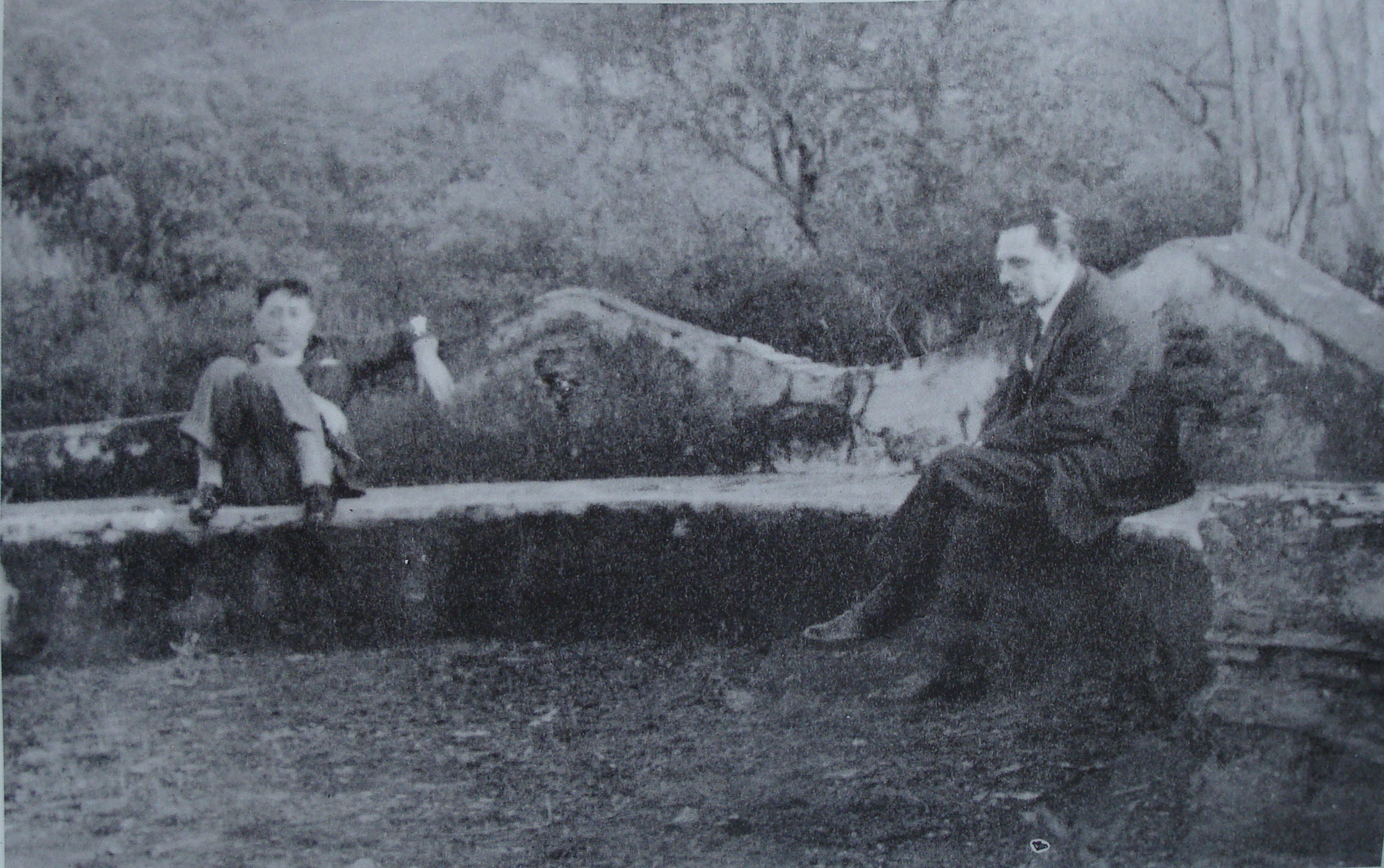
Lucio Piccolo with Giuseppe Tomasi di Lampedusa

Lucio Piccolo, also known as Baron Lucio Piccolo di Calanovella, was first cousin to Giuseppe Tomasi di Lampedusa, the author of The Leopard. Piccolo endowed himself with a vast library and mastered the major languages of the European literary tradition (as well as Persian), while living a life of relative solitude. He was also a very capable pianist, though he never performed publicly. He shared a "pastoral" home in Capo d'Orlando, Sicily, with his mother, his sister Giovanna, and his brother Casimiro. All four were spiritualists; his brother Casimiro was a painter in a style resembling Arthur Rackham.

In 1954, aged 50, he published in a private edition a "plaquette" containing nine lyric poems which he mailed to Eugenio Montale. The postage costs were grossly underestimated by the sender (35 lire), and to take possession of the book, Montale had to make up the difference by paying a further 150 lire. Montale, impressed by the high quality of the poetry of this unfamiliar writer, invited Lucio Piccolo to participate in the San Pellegrino Literary Meeting. Upon meeting Piccolo face-to-face, Montale was taken almost completely by surprise: he had expected that this previously unknown author would be a young man, not a baron in his fifties.

Piccolo's works were published that year as Canti barocchi e altre liriche ("Baroque Songs and other Lyrics"). A letter accompanying the volume, sent to Montale, stated Piccolo's intention to capture the world and atmosphere of Palermo's churches and convents, and the cast of mind of people associated with them, before the memory of them, fast fading, died completely. However, that letter was almost certainly written by di Lampedusa, not by Piccolo himself. Giorgio Bassani, in his preface to the first edition of The Leopard wrote that Piccolo's poems ranked as the best forms of pure lyric produced in Italy at that time.

His poetry was appreciated by Yeats and Pound, as well as by Montale.

== Works ==
- 9 liriche, Sant'Agata di Militello, 1954 (self-published)
- Canti barocchi e altre liriche, preface by Eugenio Montale, Mondadori, Milan, 1956
- Gioco a nascondere. Canti barocchi e altre liriche, preface by Eugenio Montale, Mondadori, Milan, 1960; reprinted 1967
- Plumelia, All'insegna del pesce d'oro, Milan, 1967
- La Seta e altre poesie inedite e sparse, ed. Giovanni Musolino and Giovanni Gaglio, All'insegna del pesce d'oro, Milan, 1984
- Il raggio verde e altre poesie inedite, ed. Giovanna Musolino, All'insegna del pesce d'oro, Milan, 1993
- Le esequie della luna e alcune poesie inedite, ed. Giovanna Musolino, All'insegna del pesce d'oro, Milan, 1996
- Antologia poetica, ed. Giuseppe Celona, All'insegna del pesce d'oro, Milan, 1999
- Canti barocchi e Gioco a nascondere, Scheiwiller, V, 2001
- Plumelia. La seta. Il raggio verde e altre poesie, preface by Pietro Gibellini, Scheiwiller, V, 2001
- L'oboe e il clarino, Scheiwiller, Milan 2002
- 9 liriche, Museo Lucio Piccolo, Ficarra, 2010
- " Von Rasten Leben Wir. Ausgewählte Gedichte. Aus dem Italienischen von Hans RAIMUND. Wieser Verlag. Klagenfurt 2004
