= The Leopard =

1958 novel by Giuseppe Tomasi di Lampedusa

- Cover of the first edition
- Author: Giuseppe Tomasi di Lampedusa
- Original title: Il Gattopardo
- Language: Italian
- Genre: Novel
- Set in: Sicily
- Published: 1958
- Publisher: Feltrinelli
- Publication place: Italy
- Media type: Print (hardcover, paperback)
- Pages: 330
- Awards: Strega Prize
- ISBN: 0-679-73121-0 (Pantheon edition)
- OCLC: 312310
- Dewey Decimal: 853.914
- LC Class: PQ4843.O53

Cover of the American Signet edition.

The Leopard (Italian: Il Gattopardo, lit. 'The Serval' [il ˌɡattoˈpardo]) is a novel by Italian writer Giuseppe Tomasi di Lampedusa, which chronicles the changes in Sicilian life and society during the Risorgimento. Published posthumously in 1958 by Feltrinelli, after two rejections by the leading Italian publishing houses Mondadori and Einaudi, it became the top-selling novel in Italian history and is considered one of the most important novels in modern Italian literature. In 1959, it won Italy's highest award for fiction, the Strega Prize. In 2012, The Guardian named it as one of "the 10 best historical novels" and in 2026, The Guardian named it as 46th in "the best 100 novels of all time". The novel was made into an award-winning 1963 film of the same name, directed by Luchino Visconti and starring Burt Lancaster, Claudia Cardinale and Alain Delon.

Lampedusa was the last generation of an old princely family of Sicily. He had long contemplated writing a historical novel based on his great-grandfather, Don Giulio Fabrizio Tomasi, another Prince of Lampedusa.

== Origins ==
Although Giuseppe Tomasi di Lampedusa was an avid reader, until the last few years of his life he had written almost nothing for publication. He first conceived the book that became The Leopard in the 1930s but did not follow through on the idea at that time. According to Tomasi's widow, Tomasi first conceived the novel as a story to take place over the course of one day in 1860, similar to James Joyce's modernist 1922 novel Ulysses. In the end, only the first chapter conformed to this plan.

In 1954 Tomasi traveled with his cousin Lucio Piccolo, another late-in-life author, to a literary conference in San Pellegrino Terme. Piccolo had been invited on the basis of his recently published poetry, and brought Tomasi as a guest. Also attending were Eugenio Montale, and Emilio Cecchi, Shortly after this, he began writing; as he wrote in 1955, "Being mathematically certain that I was no more foolish [than Lucio], I sat down at my desk and wrote a novel."

By June 1955 he completed a version of the first chapter, conforming to his original intention of a story set in a single 24-hour period in 1860. At this time, few people around him were aware that he was writing: he had always spent large amounts of time alone; those periods were now spent at his writing desk. He finally showed a four-chapter work in progress to close associates in early 1956, corresponding roughly to the first, second, seventh, and eight chapters of the eventual novel.

In May 1956, Tomasi sent a four-chapter typescript to Mondadori in Milan. That summer he wrote two more chapters (drafts of the third and fourth in the final version) and in October he sent these to Mondadori as well. Mondadori rejected the novel in December 1956, although their rejection left open the possibility of considering a future version of the same work. In early 1957 he wrote two more chapters (the eventual fifth and sixth), revised those he had already written, and sent typescripts to several people. With Tomasi's permission, his student Francesco Orlando sent a copy to literary agent Elena Croce, daughter of Benedetto Croce, leaving the author anonymous. Another recipient, bookseller and publisher Fausto Flaccovio, liked the book but was not in the business of publishing fiction; he suggested sending it to Elio Vittorini; unsurprisingly, this rather traditional novel did not appeal to modernist Vittorini, who found it "rather old-fashioned" and "essayish".

Eventually, the copy sent to Croce bore fruit, but not in Tomasi's lifetime. In 1957, he was diagnosed with lung cancer; he died on 23 July 1957 in Rome. Elena Croce sent the manuscript to the writer Giorgio Bassani, who brought it to the publisher Feltrinelli. On 3 March 1958, Feltrinelli contacted Tomasi di Lampedusa's widow to make arrangements to publish the novel. It was published in November 1958 and became a bestseller, going through 52 editions in less than six months. Il Gattopardo was quickly recognized as a great work of Italian literature. In 1959 Tomasi di Lampedusa was posthumously awarded the prestigious Strega Prize for the novel. However, the application was much discussed by the literary people of that time such as Pier Paolo Pasolini and Alberto Moravia who considered the novel too conservative. When Mario Soldati called Maria Bellonci to submit Il Gattopardo to the competition, his friend Moravia told him:"I will never look you in the face again".

== Plot ==
Most of the novel is set during the time of the Risorgimento, specifically during the period when Giuseppe Garibaldi, the leader of the famous Redshirts, swept through Sicily with his revolutionary army known as The Thousand. The novel does not follow a conventional chronological order, with chapters taking place weeks, months, or even decades apart from each other.

=== Chapter 1: 'Introduction to the Prince' ===
As the novel opens in May 1860, Garibaldi's Redshirts have landed on the Sicilian coast and are pressing inland; they will soon overthrow the Kingdom of the Two Sicilies and incorporate it into the unified Italian Kingdom under Victor Emmanuel. The plot revolves around the aristocratic Salina family, headed by Fabrizio Corbèra, Prince of Salina. In the first chapter, they are in Palermo.

(Rosary)

1. The Prince
2. The dead soldier
3. Audience with the king
4. Dinner
5. Visit to Mariannina
6. Tancredi
7. Ferrara and Russo
8. In the observatory
9. Lunch
10. Audience with tenants
11. Paolo
12. The Prince

(Rosary)

The two rosaries

The chapter begins and ends with the Prince, as the patriarch, leading his family in the Roman Catholic prayer of the Rosary. The images of the sacred are connected with the profane, with Mary Magdalene presented as a blushing and attractive prostitute. The frescoes of Grecoroman deities support the crest of the House of Salina, expressing the notion of aristocracy as divinely ordained.

1,12: The Prince's contemplations

2,11: the dead soldier, Paolo

Throughout the novel, the relationship between Europe and Italy, or even the rest of Italy and Sicily, is negatively compared. The Prince takes a stroll in his garden, where the imported French roses are hideously malformed by the tropical heat. The Prince remembers the corpse of a dead soldier, a young boy who came to the garden to die after sustaining wounds from an ill-fated battle. Undiscovered for a period of time, the odour of the decomposing body drifted through the garden and the house. If understood through the chiastic structure, Paolo, the Prince's son and heir, is compared to the wretched soldier, foreshadowing his later fate.

3,10: Audience with the king, audience with tenants

4,9: Dinner, lunch

5,8: Visit to Mariannina, In the observatory

6,7: Tancredi, Ferrara & Russo

Fabrizio finds marriage with his puritannical wife to be physically unsatisfying, and thus keeps a series of mistresses and courtesans. He indulges in his hobby of amateur astronomy, as well as hunting with his beloved Great Dane, Bendico. He is drawn to his nephew Prince Tancredi Falconeri, whom he views as a true successor who shares his noble discernment and qualities, vastly preferring him to his son and heir, Paolo, a nonentity whose main concern are horses. Later, he discovers that Tancredi has joined Garibaldi's Redshirts.

=== Chapter 2: 'Donnafugata' ===
The Salina family visits their estate in Donnafugata. During the journey, clouds of white dust envelope the family at a resting place, symbolising the unrest and disorder that will follow. Upon arrival in Donnafugata, they are greeted by raucous, provincial fanfare. The Prince, visibly relieved at the fervent worship of the peasants and the reassurance of his dominant position, inadvertently loses respect by disrupting the detached and impassive image of a feudal lord.

The Prince learns that the mayor, Don Calogero Sedara, has become wealthy through dubious business transactions and political influence, which are implied to be at the expense of nobility ruined by recent conflicts. His wealth now rivals that of the Salinas. The Prince hosts a dinner for significant persons in Donnafugata, and after deliberation, wears afternoon evening dress as a mark of condescension. When Sedara arrives in (albeit misshapen and absurd) evening tails, the Prince is betrayed and alarmed by this aesthetic subterfuge. Sedara introduces his extraordinarily beautiful daughter, Angelica, who amplifies the effect of this aesthetic subversion. Viewed through the objectifying eyes of the male onlookers, Angelica is lexically compared to the sumptuous culinary delights that populate the dinner table. Concetta, the Prince's daughter, is posited as Angelica's rival in love, as she is romantically attached to Tancredi. Tancredi, smitten with Angelica, is snubbed by Concetta and becomes entangled with Angelica.

=== Chapter 3: 'The Troubles of Don Fabrizio' ===
Although aware of his daughter's feelings, the Prince accepts the inevitable and helps arrange Tancredi's betrothal to Angelica. While negotiating the dowry, the Prince attempts to assert the dominance of the nobility through empty references to the grandeur of the Falconeri legacy. However, it becomes increasingly obvious that the opposite is true, as Don Sedara's wealth and promises of dowry eclipse the wasted Falconeri nobility, indicating the tides of change as the bourgeoisie middle-class outmanoeuvers and seduce the nobility in the emerging society.

=== Chapter 4: 'Love at Donnafugata' ===
The two have a blissful period of engagement, belying the implied tumultuous years ahead. Within the grand palace, with abandoned and unknown departments, the two lovers venture forth and engage in games of hide and seek. The sensuality, that is never realised, forms the basis of their strong feelings of love, juxtaposed with the omniscient narrative voice that explicates their unhappy marriage in the years ahead.

Later, Fabrizio is offered the position of a senator in the new Italian state but turns it down.

=== Chapter 5: 'Father Pirrone Pays a Visit' ===
Taking place simultaneously to the events of Chapter 4, Father Pirrone, the family priest, travels to his hometown to visit his family. During a political discussion with various family members and villagers, he expounds on his belief that the nobility are inherently different and beyond comprehension to the average peasant. The chapter mirrors the structure of 'Love at Donnafugata', with Father Pirrone's niece Angelina and her lover as foils to Angelica and Tancredi.

=== Chapter 6: 'A Ball' ===
Angelica is introduced to Palermo society at a sumptuous ball, and is a success, while Concetta and her sister flounder in a state of cold, unreachable dignity. The luxurious trappings of the ball are presented funereally, as the Prince sinks into a melancholic, fatalistic contemplation of his surroundings. He dances with Angelica, and for a moment regains his joy, before he is subsumed into a growing awareness of his own death and the demise of the nobility.

=== Chapter 7: 'Death of a Prince' ===
The narrative then jumps forward by twenty years and finds Prince Fabrizio on his deathbed, surrounded by family. The events of the last decades are narrated, with Maria Stella dead, Paolo trampled by horses, and Concetta and her sisters having never married. Meanwhile, Tancredi has an illustrious career in politics, although his relationship with Angelica has been troubled. The chapter enfolds amidst mundane, ugly surroundings; the train, the hotel room, an explicit departure from the beauty and grandeur of the palaces, ballrooms, and verdant gardens of before.

While suffering a series of strokes, the Prince considers that he will be the last true prince of the Salinas, and the last leopard. His meditations on the death of his family's prestige are now fully realised, as Lampedusa depicts a troubled man descending into despair over the fact that he is powerless to resist the inevitable tides of change. This is followed by a final vision of a beautiful, veiled young woman who will accompany him into the afterlife, implied to be Venus.

=== Chapter 8: 'Relics' ===
The final chapter takes place in 1910. Concetta, now seventy, is still living in the Salina estate with two of her sisters. The greatly reduced manor has now become an exhibition of relics: both the dubious relics that her sisters devotedly worship, and the mementos of past glory that Concetta stubbornly clings to. The Vicar-General and a priest visit to examine the relics in the estate’s small chapel, which is viewed by Concetta as the final act in the Salina family's decimation, losing the respect of religious authorities. Most of them are determined to be forgeries, and the priest asks Concetta to discard them.

Angelica arrives with a friend. A story by an old companion of Tancredi reveals to Concetta that he had intended to propose to her, and her memories and life choices are recast. As he drives away with Angelica, the once neglected and forlorn Falconeri estate is depicted as prospering. The Falconeri and Salina families have effectively switched places.

Along with the false icons, Concetta asks a servant to dispose of the taxidermied body of Bendico, the long-dead Great Dane. The dusty carcass is thrown out of a window. As it falls, it appears momentarily lifelike.

== Reception ==
The novel was met by criticism from people of different political views. The novelist Elio Vittorini, who had rejected an earlier draft of the book for his own press, the author Alberto Moravia, and the poet Franco Fortini, among others, condemned the book as "right-wing". Moravia wrote that it expressed ruling-class "ideas and view of life". The equally leftist Louis Aragon vehemently disagreed, seeing it as a "merciless" criticism of that class; many among the surviving Sicilian nobility certainly saw it as such, and were scandalized that one of their own could write such a thing.

The book embodies multiple opinions. The Savoyard Piedmontese are presented as naive about Southern Italy, full of plans that will never match the reality of the region, while the book's main representative of the old Bourbon regime, Don Fabrizio's brother-in-law Màlvica, is a fool. In his biography of Tomasi, David Gilmour sees Tomasi as criticising the Risorgimento (Unification of Italy) "from both sides, from the viewpoints of both Gramsci ...," describing the failure of the revolutionaries to truly ally with the peasants, "... and the Bourbons," describing a unified Italy's substitution of even worse elements into the island's elite. Despite or because of this controversy, The Leopard ultimately gained great critical acclaim. In 1959, it won Italy's highest award for fiction, the Strega Prize.

== Analysis ==
=== Historical and autobiographical elements ===
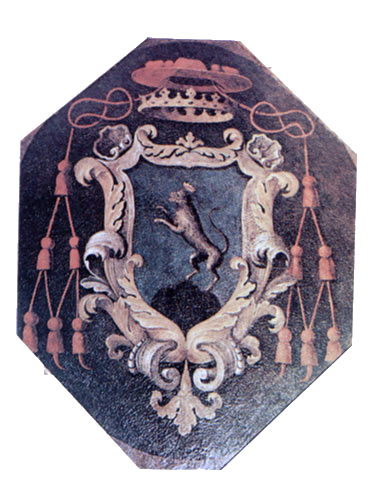
Tomasi di Lampedusa's coat of arms features a serval, a smaller cat than a leopard.

The novel contains both historical and autobiographical elements. During the time he was writing, Tomasi stated in a letter to his friend Baron Enrico Merlo di Tagliavia that Don Fabrizio, the "'Prince of Salina is the Prince of Lampedusa, my great-grandfather Giulio Fabrizio", (Note: Excerpts from a letter by the author to his friend Baron Enrico Merlo di Tagliavia that describes the relationship between the historical and fictional characters: There is no need to tell you that the "Prince of Salina" is the Prince of Lampedusa, my great-grandfather Giulio Fabrizio; everything about him is real: his build, his mathematics, the pretense of violence, the skepticism, the wife, the German mother, the refusal to be a senator: Father Pirrone is also authentic, even his name. I think I have given them both a greater degree of intelligence than in fact was the case. ... Tancredi is, physically and in his behavior, Giò; morally a blend of Senator Scalea and his son Pietro. I've no idea who Angelica is, but bear in mind that the name Sedàra is quite similar to "Favara." ... Donnafugata as a village is Palma; as a palace, Santa Margherita. ... Bendicò is a vitally important character and practically the key to the novel.) but also (in a letter to Guido Lajolo) "friends who have read it say that the Prince of Salina bears an awful resemblance to myself." While Don Fabrizio's circumstances and many of his traits are clearly those of di Tomasi's great-grandfather, this is not necessarily so true of his opinions. In a further letter to Lajolo, after he had written more of the novel, Tomasi emphasised the autobiographical aspect of the character: "Don Fabrizio expresses my ideas completely." David Gilmour, in his biography of Tomasi, sees the character as mainly autobiographical but adds that there is also a fair amount of "the person the writer would like to have been" in Salina's "arrogant confidence, his overt sensuality, his authority over others..."

Similarly, Tomasi wrote to Merlo di Tagliavia that "Tancredi is, physically and in his behavior, Giò [Tomasi's adopted son Gioacchino Lanza Tomasi]; morally a blend of Francesco Lanza Spinelli di Scalea and his son Pietro." To Lajolo he wrote that, in terms of appearance and habits, Tancredi is "a portrait of Giò; as for his morals, however, Giò is fortunately very much better than him." In his circumstances and actions, Tancredi also owes a lot to Giulio Fabrizio's nephew, Corrado Valguarnera, and to some of the latter's friends and associates. Some of the reaction against the book by Sicilian aristocrats came from their taking Tancredi and his wife Angelica as "portraits of Corrado Valguarnera and his wife Maria Favara," then being unhappy that they were not accurate portraits. Gilmour remarks that the discrepancies from these historical figures are "not surprising because [Tomasi] had not tried to make them very similar."

Some of the strongest historical and autobiographical elements of The Leopard are in the portraits of the places of Tomasi's life, especially his childhood. The town of Donnafugata is certainly Santa Margherita di Belice (near Palma di Montechiaro) and the palace there the Palazzo Filangeri-Cutò, though considerably larger and more elaborate than the original. Villa Salina outside Palermo is the Villa Lampedusa in Lorenzo outside Palermo. The Palazzo Lampedusa in Palermo does not appear in the novel, although several of its rooms do.

Despite being universally known and published in English as The Leopard, the original Italian title for the novel is Il Gattopardo, meaning "The Serval", which refers to a much smaller species of wild cat found in sub-Saharan Africa. The symbol on the Tomasi di Lampedusa coat of arms is a serval.

=== Locations ===
The Kingdom of the Two Sicilies at the time of The Leopard

- Sicily
- The Kingdom of Sardinia
- The Kingdom of the Two Sicilies
- Kingdom of Italy (1861–1946)
- Salina – the fictional Corbèra palatial estate in San Lorenzo, about 10 km south of the center of Palermo.
- Donnafugata – the fictional name for the town Santa Margherita di Belice (near Palma di Montechiaro) and the Palazzo Filangeri-Cutò. Both the palace and adjacent Mother Church were destroyed by an earthquake in 1968.

=== Historical characters ===
- Giuseppe Garibaldi, the military leader of the Expedition of the Thousand (11 May to 1 October 1860) from Marsala in Sicily to northern Lazio (Campania)
- Ferdinand II, a Bourbon King of The Two Sicilies. Reigned from 8 November 1830 to 22 May 1859. Died shortly before the narration of The Leopard begins. The Bourbons ruled the kingdom from Naples and lived in the Caserta Palace.
- Francis II, the last Bourbon King of the Two Sicilies. Reigned from 22 May 1859 to 20 March 1861.
- Victor Emmanuel II, Savoy King of Sardinia from 23 March 1849 to 17 March 1861, and King of Italy from 17 March 1861 to 9 January 1878. Resident at the Royal Palace of Turin.

=== Fictional characters ===
The Corbera Family:

- Fabrizio Corbera, Prince of Salina, born 1810
- Maria Stella, Princess of Salina
- Carolina, eldest of seven children, born 1840
- Francesco Paolo, eldest surviving son and heir, born 1844
- Concetta, second daughter, born 1848
- Tancredi Falconeri, orphan son of the prince's sister and her profligate husband, born 1834
- Bendicò, the family dog

Others at Salina:

- Father Pirrone, Jesuit family priest; helps the prince with mathematical computations
- Pietro Russo, steward
- Ciccio Ferrara, accountant
- Mademoiselle Dombreuil, French governess

Characters at Donnafugata:

- Calogero Sedàra, Mayor of Donnafugata
- Angelica, Calogero's daughter, born 1844
- Monsignor Trotolino, priest at Holy Mother Church
- Ciccio Genestra, notary
- Onofrio Rotolo, steward
- Toto Giambono, doctor
- Ciccio Tumeo, organist at Holy Mother Church; hunting partner of the prince
- Count Carlo Cavriaghi, friend of Tancredi from Lombardy
- Knight Aimone Chevalley di Monterzuolo, bureaucrat from Piedmont

== Adaptations ==
The novel served as the basis for a film directed by Luchino Visconti. Starring Burt Lancaster, it won the Palme d'Or at the Cannes Film Festival. 20th Century Fox cut the film dramatically for its original 1963 release, but in 1983 Visconti's vision was re-released with English subtitles and the famous ballroom scene restored to its full 45 minute running time.

The novel was adapted for radio by Michael Hastings and broadcast on BBC Radio 3 in 2008. The radio play starred Tom Hiddleston as Tancredi, Hayley Atwell as Angelica, Stanley Townsend as Don Fabrizio, and Julie Legrand as Princess Stella.

The novel was made into an opera by composer Michael Dellaira and librettist J. D. McClatchy. It premiered in March, 2022 at the South Miami-Dade Cultural Arts Center by the Frost Opera Theater, conducted by Gerard Schwarz and directed by Jeffrey Buchman, with music direction by Alan Johnson. The production featured Kim Josephson as Prince Don Fabrizio, Robynne Redmon as Princess Stella, Frank Ragsdale as Father Pirrone, and Kevin Short as Chevalley.

In March 2025, Netflix released a miniseries adaptation directed by Tom Shankland and starring Kim Rossi Stuart as Don Fabrizio Corbera.

== Editions ==
- An edition of Il gattopardo following the manuscript of 1957 is published by
  - Milan: Feltrinelli Editore, Universale Economica ISBN 88-07-81028-X
- Archibald Colquhoun's English translation, The Leopard, originally published in 1960 by Collins (in the UK) and Pantheon Books (in the US) is available from
  - London: The Harvill Press, Panther ISBN 1-86046-145-X
  - London: David Campbell, Everyman's Library ISBN 1-85715-023-6
  - London: Collins, Fontana Modern Novels ASIN B0C9W18SJD
  - New York: Pantheon Books ISBN 0-679-73121-0
  - New York: Pantheon Books (Paperback) ISBN 978-0-679-73121-4

== Sources ==
- Gilmour, David (1988). The Last Leopard: A life of Giuseppe Tomasi di Lampedusa. New York: Pantheon. ISBN 978-0-679-40183-4.
- Tomasi di Lampedusa, Giuseppe; Colquhoun, Archibald (trans.) (1960). The Leopard (paperback ed.). New York: Pantheon Books. ISBN 978-0-679-73121-4.
