= Giuseppe Tomasi di Lampedusa =

Sicilian writer and prince (1896–1957)

Don Giuseppe Tomasi
- Prince of Lampedusa; Duke of Palma di Montechiaro; Grandee of Spain
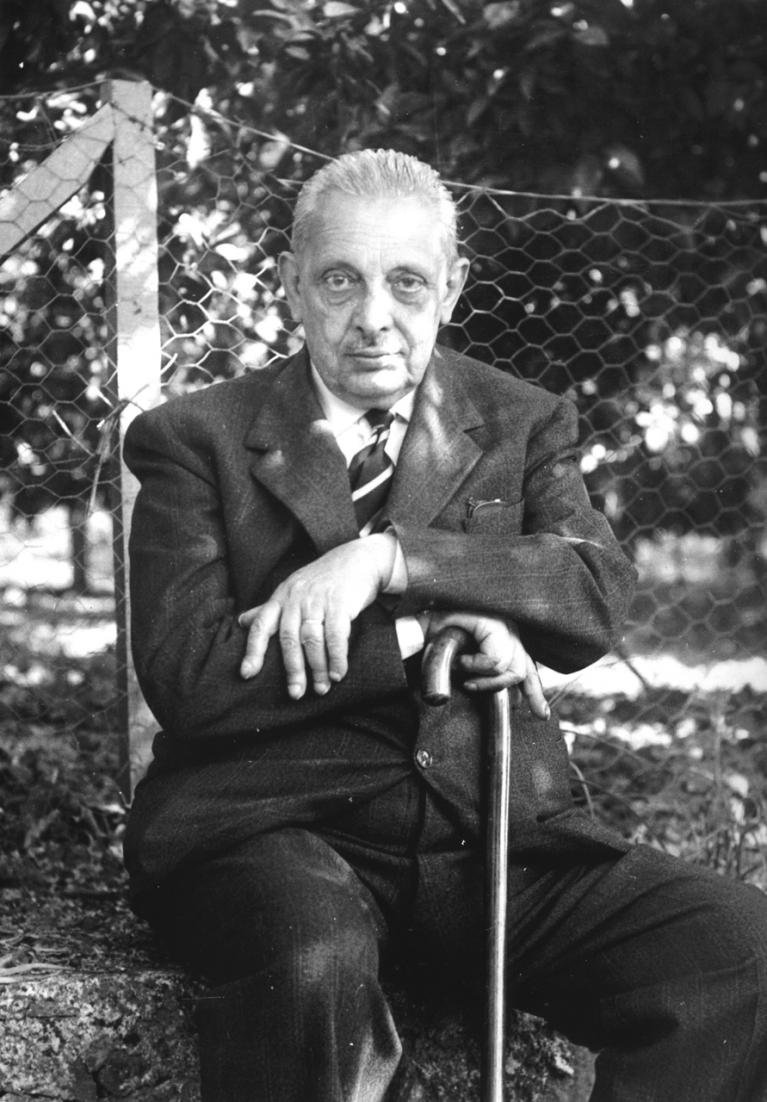
- Tomasi in Capo d'Orlando, 1956
- Born: 23 December 1896; Palermo, Kingdom of Italy
- Died: 23 July 1957 (aged 60); Rome, Italy
- Spouse: Alexandra von Wolff-Stomersee

Giuseppe Tomasi, 11th Prince of Lampedusa, 12th Duke of Palma, GE (23 December 1896 – 23 July 1957), known as Giuseppe Tomasi di Lampedusa (Italian: [dʒuˈzɛppe toˈmaːzi di lampeˈduːza]), was a Sicilian writer, as well as the last generation of Tomasi Princes of Lampedusa before the family's and their titles' extinction (although his uncle Pietro Tomasi della Torretta, former Ambassador of Italy to the United Kingdom and President of the Senate, was the last official holder of the family’s princely title).

Tomasi di Lampedusa is most famous for his only novel, Il Gattopardo (first published posthumously in 1958), which is set in his native Sicily during the Risorgimento. A reserved, solitary, shy, and somewhat misanthropic aristocrat, he opened up only with a few close friends, and spent a great deal of his time reading and meditating. He said of himself as a child, "I was a boy who liked solitude, who preferred the company of things to that of people", and in 1954 wrote, "Of my sixteen hours of daily wakefulness, at least ten are spent in solitude."

== Biography ==
Tomasi was born in Palermo to Giulio Maria Tomasi, Prince of Lampedusa, Duke of Palma di Montechiaro, Baron of Torretta, and Grandee of Spain (1868–1934), and Beatrice Mastrogiovanni Tasca Filangieri di Cutò (1870–1946). He was fourth cousin once removed of jeweler Fulco di Verdura and first cousin of poet Lucio Piccolo. He became an only child after the death (from diphtheria) in 1897 of his sister Stefania. He was very close to his mother, a strong personality who influenced him a great deal, especially because his father was rather cold and detached. Although much of the paternal family fortune was lost even before his father's time, and another large portion was tied up in lengthy litigation, they still owned the grand Palazzo Lampedusa in Palermo, which they shared with his paternal grandparents, three bachelor uncles, and a number of servants. This was the main residence of his childhood, although he spent summers and some other periods at the Palazzo Filangeri-Cutò, his mother's family home in rural Santa Margherita di Belice.

At first, his education was a bit erratic: on his eighth birthday, he had already learned conversational French but had not yet learned to read or write even his native language. Beginning in the summer of his eighth year he studied in the two family palaces with a tutor (including the subjects of literature and English), with his mother (who taught him French) and with a grandmother who read him the novels of Emilio Salgari. The palace in Santa Marghereta had an excellent library, from which Tomasi soon read voraciously. The palace at Santa Margherita had a small theatre. For two weeks every summer a troupe of traveling players rented the theatre for a nominal fee and put on a different play every night. Tomasi saw many performances there; years later he particularly recalled seeing his first performance of Hamlet with an audience composed largely of "illiterate labourers."

In March 1911 his mother's younger sister, Princess Julia Trigona, a lady in waiting to Queen Elena, was murdered by her lover Baron Vincenzo Paternò del Cugno. The resulting scandal led the family to spend the summer in Tuscany and the autumn in Rome. That autumn, Tomasi attended the liceo classico in Rome and then continued that curriculum at the liceo in Palermo for roughly three years. In 1914-1915 he was enrolled in the Law Faculty of the University of Genoa, though it is not clear that he actually ever attended. He definitely attended law classes in Rome in early 1915. However that year he was drafted into the army. He served first in the artillery (where he became a corporal), then transferred to the infantry. Beginning in May 1917 he underwent officer training in Turin, and was sent to the front as an officer that September. When the Italians lost the Battle of Caporetto, he was well to the west of the front lines of the main battle, but was taken prisoner by the Austro-Hungarian Army during the chaotic retreat. He was held in a prisoner of war camp near Vienna (and was even allowed a visit to the city at one point). As the war approached its end he succeeded in escaping and returning to Italy.

After being mustered out of the army in February 1920 as a lieutenant, he returned to Sicily, where he spent several months in a state of nervous exhaustion. After a few brief attempts at resuming his formal studies, he entered a relatively peripatetic stage of his life. Finding post-War Sicily much less to his taste than pre-War Sicily, he spent time in Genoa, Turin, Tuscany, Bologna and even Munich.

While his formal education may have been erratic, Tomasi was a strong, self-driven reader, and had a great facility with languages. Besides a basic knowledge of Latin and Greek obtained in the liceo, he had mastered Italian, French, and German as a child, and English shortly thereafter. Late in life, he would add Spanish, and he also learned some Russian along the way. He read extensively in all of these languages, as well as reading Russian literature in translation. Primarily he read literature and history, though he also read books about art and architecture. His tastes were broad and his reading extensive: he had read all of Shakespeare's works before his first visit to the United Kingdom in his twenties; he was almost certainly one of the first Italians to plunge seriously into James Joyce; and he read many minor writers, many of whom he found provided a window into particular times and milieux.

Tomasi's uncle Pietro Tomasi Della Torretta was Italian ambassador to the UK from 1922 to 1927. Although Pietro's own politics were liberal conservative, he was a diplomat rather than a politician and continued to serve into Italy's Fascist era until Mussolini ultimately demanded his resignation. Tomasi made numerous long visits to London during his uncle's tenure as ambassador, travelling a good deal within the United Kingdom and in France on the way there and back. It was also through his uncle that Tomasi would meet his future wife. Pietro was married to Alice Barbi, who was widow of a Baltic German baron, by whom she had two daughters Olga, nicknamed Lolette, and Alexandra von Wolff-Stomersee (1894–1982), nicknamed "Licy".

Little is known of Tomasi's relations with women before his marriage. He was engaged at least twice—once to an English girl, once to an Italian girl—but even the names of these fiancées are unknown, as are the names of his friends and associates in England, including a Scottish girl with whom he once described himself as "infatuated."

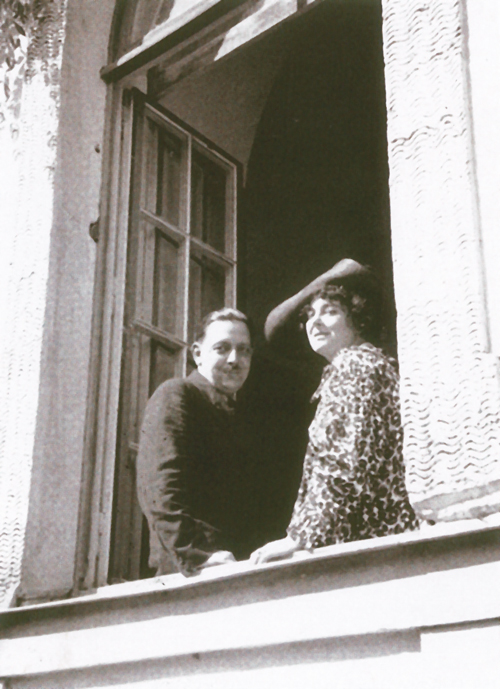
With Licy at Stomersee in 1931

Tomasi and Licy first met in London in 1925. He visited her at Stāmeriena Palace (Stomersee) in 1927. They met again in Rome in 1930, Stomersee in 1931, and she visited him at Easter 1932 in Palermo. Since 1918, and throughout this period, she remained married to André Pilar, an Estonian baron. Pilar was homosexual, and the terms of the marriage are unclear; Pilar, Licy, and Tomasi all remained close even after the prior couple divorced and Licy married Tomasi. (For that matter, it is not clear whether Tomasi's marriage with Licy had a sexual component, either.)

The marriage took place in the Orthodox Annunciation of Our Most Holy Lady Church in Riga on 24 August 1932. Tomasi had kept his marriage plans entirely secret from his family and even on his wedding day sent them letters saying only that he had "decided to marry" Licy, not that he had done so; it took about a month for him to come clean. At the time of their marriage Licy was a student of psychoanalysis. They first lived with Tomasi's mother in Palermo, but the incompatibility between the two women soon drove Licy back to Latvia. Through the rest of the 1930s, he lived largely in Palermo and she variously in Riga or Stomersee; typically she made an annual winter visit to Palermo and he made a summer visit to the Baltic. Licy began practising as a psychoanalyst in 1936.

In June 1934 Tomasi di Lampedusa's father died, and he inherited his princely title. According to his widow, shortly after this he first conceived his future novel The Leopard. Originally his plan was to have the entire novel occur over the course of one day, similar to the famous modernist novel by James Joyce, Ulysses.

He was briefly called back to arms in 1940, but, as the owner of a hereditary agricultural estate, was soon sent home to take care of its affairs. He served again very briefly in January 1942, but was sent home because of periostitis in his right leg. He and his mother took refuge in Capo d'Orlando, first with his Piccolo cousins and then in a place of their own; Licy had fled the Baltic to escape the heavy fighting there, initially settling in Rome. They were reunited in Ficarra, but again his mother and Licy failed to get along; when the war ended for Italy, the couple headed for Palermo while his mother first remained in Ficarra, then went back to Capo d'Orlando.

The people closest to Tomasi all survived the war, but the Lampedusa palace in Palermo did not; it was a near-ruin from Allied bombing. Although some of Tomasi's writing suggests that the destruction was total, they were able to salvage much of the furniture and nearly all of Tomasi's extensive library. Enough remained of the building that Tomasi's mother lived out the last year of her life in the remnant, dying in 1946.

In Palermo, Tomasi and Licy first rented a furnished apartment in an old, poorer quarter of Palermo. After a little less than two years, he gave up any serious hope of restoring the Palazzo Lampedusa, though the loss weighed on him till the end of his life; he then purchased the nearby house at number 28 Via Butera, a well-architected older house, even a "palace," but in what was by then a slum district. In the immediate post-war years, Licy had her psychoanalytic patients, and was by this time vice president of the Italian Society of Psychoanalysts, which meant she spent a good deal of time in Rome. For about two years beginning in late 1944, Tomasi served as president of the Palermo provincial committee of the Italian Red Cross; he resigned in March 1947, unable to cope with the "dark intrigues" (his words) that interfered with so many projects in Sicily. On the whole, this was a dark period for Tomasi, lightened somewhat by his continuing visits to his Piccolo cousins in Capo d'Orlando, where his cousin Lucio remained his closest intellectual friend.

In 1953 he began to spend time with a group of young intellectuals, one of whom was future literary critic Francesco Orlando, and another of whom was Tomasi's distant cousin Gioacchino Lanza, with whom he developed such a close relationship that in 1956 he legally adopted him. Their conversations soon turned into an intensive series of classes taught by Tomasi. He taught Orlando English, which Orlando appears to have picked up remarkably rapidly, and then began a series of classes on European literature. Tomasi's notes for these classes were the most extensive piece of writing he ever did; they included a 1000-page critical history of English literature from Bede to Graham Greene, including an effort to place the various writers in their historical-political contexts. This was followed by a less formal course on French literature and some less formal studies (Goethe, Spanish literature, Sicilian history) with individual members of the group.

Tomasi travelled in 1954 with his cousin, the poet Lucio Piccolo, to San Pellegrino Terme to attend a literary conference; Piccolo had been invited on the basis of his recently published poetry and brought Tomasi as a guest. Also attending were, among others, Eugenio Montale, Emilio Cecchi, and Maria Bellonci. Upon returning from this trip he commenced writing Il Gattopardo (The Leopard). In 1955 he wrote, "Being mathematically certain that I was no more foolish [than Lucio], I sat down at my desk and wrote a novel."

By June 1955 he had completed a version of the first chapter, conforming to his original intent of a story set in a single 24-hour period in 1860. He then digressed to write the first chapter of a projected autobiography; this chapter was published posthumously as "The Places of My Early Childhood." He then returned to writing the novel. Initially, few people around him were aware of any of this: the large amounts of time he spent alone were now spent at his writing desk. He did finally show the work in progress to most of his close associates in early 1956. For the brief remainder of his life he would alternate between expanding and revising the novel and working on various shorter works.

During his life, the novel was rejected by the two publishers to whom Tomasi submitted it. The published novel would eventually have eight chapters; in May 1956, he sent a four-chapter typescript to Mondadori in Milan. That summer he wrote two more chapters and in October he sent these to Mondadori as well. Mondadori rejected the novel in December 1956, although their rejection left open the possibility of considering a future version of the same work. In early 1957 he wrote two more chapters, revised those he had already written, and sent typescripts to several people. With Tomasi's permission, Francesco Orlando sent a copy to literary agent Elena Croce, daughter of Benedetto Croce, leaving the author anonymous. Another recipient, bookseller and publisher Fausto Flaccovio, liked the book but was not in the business of publishing fiction; he suggested sending it to Elio Vittorini, unsurprisingly this rather traditional novel did not appeal to modernist Vittorini, who found it "rather old-fashioned" and "essayish".

Eventually, the copy sent to Croce bore fruit, but not in Tomasi's lifetime. In 1957 Tomasi di Lampedusa was diagnosed with lung cancer; he died on 23 July in Rome. Following a requiem in the Basilica del Sacro Cuore di Gesù in Rome, he was buried three days later in the Capuchin cemetery of Palermo.

His novel was published the year after his death. Elena Croce had sent it to the writer Giorgio Bassani, who brought it to the publisher Feltrinelli. On 3 March 1958, the publisher Feltrinelli contacted Licy to make arrangements to publish the novel. Il Gattopardo was quickly recognized as a great work of Italian literature. It was published in November 1958, and became a bestseller, going through 52 editions in less than six months. In 1959 Tomasi di Lampedusa was posthumously awarded the prestigious Strega Prize for the novel.

== Works ==
Tomasi did little public writing before the last few years of his life. He maintained a commonplace book (mostly in French, but also with passages in English and Italian; this appears to have been compiled mainly in the 1920s) and a laconic diary in which he often noted where he visited, what films he saw, etc.; in 1926-1927 he published three articles of literary criticism in Le Opere e i Giorni, a little magazine associated with Gabriele D'Annunzio and Luigi Pirandello. He also wrote, but made no attempt to publish, several other short pieces about literature. He took photographs when he travelled, but none of them rose above the level of tourist snapshots.

In the mid-1950s he wrote extensive notes (not originally intended for publication) on European literature, including a 1000-page critical history of English literature from Bede to Graham Greene.

His novel Il Gattopardo (The Leopard ) follows the family of its title character, the Sicilian nobleman Don Fabrizio Corbera, Prince of Salina, through the events of the Risorgimento. Perhaps the most memorable line in the book is spoken by Don Fabrizio's nephew, Tancredi, urging unsuccessfully that Don Fabrizio abandon his allegiance to the disintegrating Kingdom of the Two Sicilies and ally himself with Giuseppe Garibaldi and the House of Savoy: "Unless we ourselves take a hand now, they'll foist a republic on us. If we want things to stay as they are, things will have to change", an approach to politics that has become known as the di Lampedusa strategy. The point-of-view character, Don Fabrizio, explicitly rejects this view, and despite the name "di Lampedusa strategy" there is little reason to think the author himself endorsed it.

The title is rendered in English as The Leopard, but the Italian word gattopardo refers to the African serval, native not far from Lampedusa, in Northern Africa. Il gattopardo may be a reference to a wildcat that was hunted to extinction in Italy in the mid-19th century – just as Don Fabrizio was dryly contemplating the indolence and decline of the Sicilian aristocracy.

In 1963 Il Gattopardo was made into a film, directed by Luchino Visconti and starring Burt Lancaster, Alain Delon, and Claudia Cardinale; it won the Palme d'Or at the Cannes Film Festival.

Tomasi also wrote some lesser-known works: I racconti (Stories, first published 1961), including the novella The Professor and the Siren, and the first chapter of an unfinished novel, I gattini ciechi ("The Blind Kittens"); Le lezioni su Stendhal (Lessons on Stendhal, privately published in 1959, published in book form in 1977); and Invito alle lettere francesi del Cinquecento (Introduction to sixteenth-century French literature, first published 1970). In 2010, a collection of his letters were published in English as Letters from London and Europe. His perceptive commentaries on English and other foreign literatures make up a greater part of his works by volume than does his fiction.

== Views on politics and literature ==
Tomasi's political views are not easily pigeonholed. He was a self-declared monarchist who declined the Monarchist National Party's request that he offer his candidacy in 1948 for the Italian Senate and actively chose not to join that party; he was generally critical of both the Bourbon monarchs who had ruled the Kingdom of the Two Sicilies and their successors, the Savoyard monarchs who ruled the Kingdom of Italy. His dissent from the typical views one would expect of a monarchist was even more dramatic in some matters not affecting Sicily: he preferred Oliver Cromwell to Charles II and the Jacobins to Louis XVI, of whom he wrote that no one in history had more deserved to have his head cut off.

Tomasi despised Sicilian liberals as corrupt and ineffective (though he had at least a grudging admiration for British liberals) and initially admired the Italian fascists, though he never particularly threw in his lot with them and was away from Italy more during the fascist era than at any other time. In the 1950s, he referred to one of Mussolini's works as an "encyclopaedia of ignorance and conceit." He was sympathetic to the Jansenists and to English Catholics such as Graham Greene, one of his favorite contemporary writers, but also to the English Puritans; the poet John Milton was another of his favorites.

As remarked above, when Tancredi in The Leopard says, "If we want things to stay as they are, things will have to change," there is no reason to believe that he is speaking for the author. Tomasi's pessimism about Sicily, and his regret over what he sees as his homeland's corruption and "irredeemability" is tempered by a sense of its grandeur. As for the causes of Sicilian "irredeemability," the novel spreads the blame widely. The Savoyard Piedmontese are presented as naive about the South, full of plans that will never match the reality of the region, while the book's main representative of the old Bourbon regime, Don Fabrizio's brother-in-law Màlvica, is a fool. In his biography of Tomasi, David Gilmour sees Tomasi as criticising the Risorgimento (Unification of Italy) "from both sides, from the viewpoints of both Gramsci…," describing the failure of the revolutionaries to truly ally with the peasants, "…and the Bourbons," describing a unified Italy's substitution of even worse elements into the island's elite.

Upon publication of The Leopard, Elio Vittorini (who had rejected an earlier draft of the book for his own press), Alberto Moravia, and Franco Fortini, among others, condemned the book as "right-wing;" in Moravia's words, it expressed ruling-class "ideas and view of life." The equally leftist Louis Aragon vehemently disagreed, seeing it as a "merciless" criticism of that class; many among the surviving Sicilian nobility certainly saw it as such, and were scandalized that one of their own could write such a thing.

Tomasi read broadly in English, French, German, Italian, and later Spanish and (to a lesser extent) Russian. He owned 1,100 books on French history, including keeping up to date on the then-current work of Fernand Braudel and the Annales school. Similarly, his reading in Italian history continued through Federico Chabod and Adolfo Omodeo. He listened to a fair amount of music, both in live performance and recordings, but never had anything like the interest in music he had for the written word or theatre, and often criticized how Italian operas that were adapted from plays "deformed" the works by oversimplification. Not that he demanded that all literature be deep and difficult. Although his course on English literature included James Joyce and T.S. Eliot, it also covered thrillers (which he traced back to the lesser Elizabethan tragedies) and detective novels (he considered Arthur Conan Doyle and G. K. Chesterton to be the best writers of the latter genre) and he was a regular filmgoer: even while writing The Leopard he went to the cinema two or three times a week; one of the films he particularly liked during that period was the Disney-produced 20,000 Leagues Under the Sea.

As a reader, in maturity Tomasi came to prefer (in Gilmour's words) "the implicit over the explicit," though he acknowledged that his own novel, The Leopard, fell more into the latter category. He liked English humour (including the use of humour in otherwise serious works), especially self-deprecating humour and understatement, and saw Samuel Johnson as the epitome of Englishness. He generally rejected elaborate critical apparatus and theory, but was very interested in comparing and contrasting writers, or looking into why particular works were more appreciated in one time or place than another, or how writers in different eras had handled the same themes. And he was not afraid to make judgements. Much though he loved Shakespeare, he found roughly eighty of his sonnets quite weak (and some of those absolutely "worthless"); at the other extreme he found forty of them "among the finest things in world literature." He considered Charles Dickens "a demi-God" but still confessed to being exasperated by his sentimentalism.

In French literature he saw Montaigne as a figure comparable to Shakespeare for his ideas, even if expressed very differently: perceptive, compassionate, sceptical, irreligious but understanding of others' religious feelings, persistent in "dismantling the human psyche." He considered the fact that Montaigne's writings had been roundly disliked by Napoleon, Hitler, and Mussolini to be entirely in Montaigne's favour (although he conjectured that the latter two hadn't actually bothered to read him). He also loved Stendhal and agreed with André Gide that two of Stendhal's works—The Red and the Black and The Charterhouse of Parma—were the two strongest contenders for being the best novel in any language; he was especially impressed by how concise Stendhal could be.

In poetry, he favoured John Keats and Giacomo Leopardi. Despite his admiration for Leopardi, he saw Italy in general as anti-literary, wanting from a book either that it be "exciting and thoughtless" or so boring that its purchase constituted a performative sacrifice. He lamented the lack of humour in most Italian literature, and felt that many Italian writers were either narrow and provincial or wrote about places and things they knew only superficially.

== Legacy ==
The main-belt asteroid 14846 Lampedusa is named after him.

On the occasion of the 14th edition of the Rome Film Festival, the docufilm Die Geburt des Leoparden, directed by Luigi Falorni, was screened. A journey to discover the life of the last Prince of Lampedusa told by the voices and testimonies of loved ones.

In 2019 Canadian novelist Steven Price published a novelized biography of Giuseppe Tomasi di Lampedusa entitled Lampedusa.

== Titles ==
Arms of the Tomasi Princes of Lampedusa

His full title was:

Don Giuseppe Tomasi, 11th Prince of Lampedusa, 12th Duke of Palma, 13th Baron of Montechiaro, Marquess and Baron of Torretta, and Grandee of Spain of the First Class.

== Sources ==
- Gilmour, David (1988). The Last Leopard: A life of Giuseppe Tomasi di Lampedusa. New York: Pantheon. ISBN 0679401830.
- Maslov, Loup Odoevsky (2025). Giuseppe Tomasi di Lampedusa - une biographie. Paris: Séguier. ISBN 978-2-38636-033-6.
