= List of ambassadors of Italy to the United Kingdom =

Ambassador of Italy to the United Kingdom
- Ambasciatore d'Italia al Regno Unito
- Incumbent; Raffaele Trombetta since January 29, 2018
- Style: His Excellency
- Inaugural holder: Vittorio Emanuele Taparelli d'Azeglio
- Formation: April 13, 1859

The Ambassador of Italy to the United Kingdom is the Italy's foremost diplomatic representative in the United Kingdom, and head of the Italy's diplomatic mission in the United Kingdom. The official title of the Italian Ambassador to the Court of St James's is Ambasciatore d'Italia al Regno Unito. On the basis of the Vienna Convention on Diplomatic Relations of 18 April 1961, the embassy's functions include the following:

- Represent Italy in the United Kingdom of Great Britain and Northern Ireland;
- Safeguard the interests of Italy and its citizens, within the limits set by international law;
- Negotiate with the government of the United Kingdom of Great Britain and Northern Ireland;
- Gather information, by any legal means, on conditions and events in the United Kingdom and report back to the Italian State;
- Promote friendly relations and develop economic, cultural and scientific collaborations between Italy and the United Kingdom.

== Heads of mission ==
=== Ambassadors ===
- 2026–present: Fabio Cassese
- 2022–2026: Inigo Lambertini
- 2018–2022: Raffaele Trombetta
- 2013-2018: Pasquale Terracciano
- 2010-2013: Alain Giorgio Maria Economides
- 2004-2009: Giancarlo Aragona
- 1999-2004: Luigi Amaduzzi
- 1995-1999: Paolo Galli
- 1991-1995: Giacomo Attolico
- 1987-1991: Boris Biancheri
- 1985-1987: Bruno Bottai
- 1980-1985: Andrea Cagiati
- 1975-1980: Roberto Ducci
- 1968-1975: Raimondo Manzini
- 1964-1968: Gastone Guidotti
- 1961-1964: Pietro Quaroni
- 1955-1961: Vittorio Zoppi
- 1952-1954: Manlio Brosio
- 1947-1951: Tommaso Gallarati Scotti
- 1944-1947: Nicolò Carandini
- 1939-1940: Giuseppe Bastianini
- 1932-1939: Dino Grandi
- 1927-1932: Antonio Chiaramonte Bordonaro
- 1922-1927: Pietro Tomasi Della Torretta
- 1921-1922: Giacomo De Martino
- 1910-1920: Guglielmo Imperiali
- 1906-1910: Antonino di San Giuliano
- 1906-1906: Tommaso Tittoni
- 1901-1906: Alberto Pansa
- 1898-1900: Francesco De Renzis
- 1895-1898: Annibale Ferrero
- 1889-1894: Giuseppe Tornielli
- 1888-1888: Carlo Felice di Robilant
- 1886-1888: Luigi Corti
- 1883-1885: Costantino Nigra
- 1876-1882: Luigi Federico Menabrea
- 1869-1875: Carlo Cadorna
- 1861-1868: Vittorio Emanuele Taparelli d'Azeglio
