= Candida (family) =

Italian noble family

Candida Italian: Casa di Candida
- Italian noble family
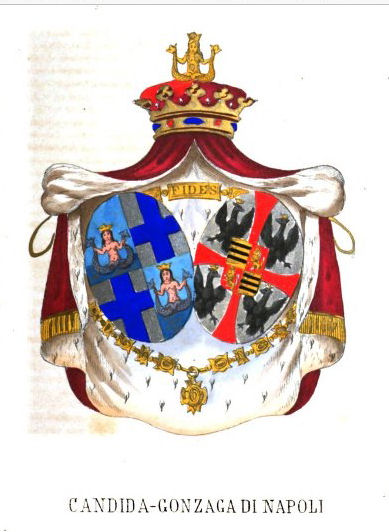
- Coat of arms of the Candida-Gonzaga
- Parent family: Filangieri
- Country: Italy
- Founder: Aldoino Filangieri di Candida
- Titles: Count of the Holy Roman Empire; Count of Barete; Count of Bolignano; Count of Polenta; Count of Sorrovoli; Lord of Candida
- Cadet branches: Benevento; Cremona; Lucera; Molfetta; Naples; Nola

The Candida family was a noble Italian family from Naples.

== History ==
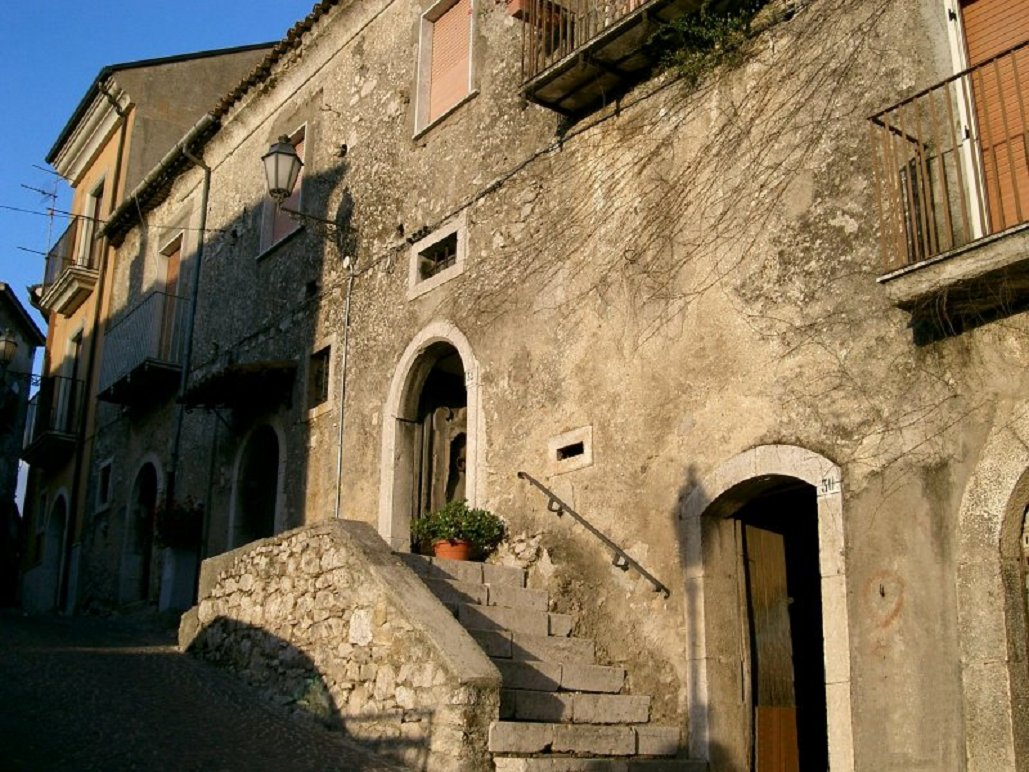
Entrance to Candida Castle

It was a branch of the noble Filangieri family and had as its founder Alduino Filangieri (13th century), Lord of Candida, from which derived the family surname.

The family was divided into several branches: Benevento, Cremona, Lucera, Molfetta, Naples and Nola. The Naples branch succeeded the Duke of Mantua, Ferdinando Carlo Gonzaga (1652–1708), added the surname Gonzaga to its own.

=== Candida Gonzaga ===
In 1832, Count Antonio Candida obtained from the Marquis of Vescovato, Francesco Luigi Gonzaga (1763–1832), the last titular Lord of Vescovato, the right to add to his own surname that of the noble Gonzaga family. (Note: The Marquises of Vescovato, the senior line of the House of Gonzaga since the 18th century, were direct descendants of Giovanni Gonzaga (1474–1525), the youngest son of Federico I Gonzaga, Marquis of Mantua (1441–1484).)

== Notable members ==
=== Candida ===
- Aldoino Filangieri di Candida (d. 1283), 1st Lord of Candida.
- Riccardo Filangieri di Candida (d. 1321), son of the previous, became 2nd Lord of Candida.
- Pietro Candida (b. 1335), Secretary of Pope Callixtus III and King Alfonso V of Aragon.
- Nicolò Candida (15th century), man-at-arms of King Alfonso V of Aragon in 1442.
- Andrea Candida (d. 1459), Knight of Jerusalem.
- Luca Candida (15th century), Knight of Jerusalem.
- Giovanni Candida (d. 1510), Bishop of Bovino in 1477.
- Giovanni Candida (b. 1506), Secretary of the King of Naples.
- Carlo Candida (1762–1845), soldier and Bailiff Grand Cross of the Sovereign Military Order of Malta.
- Berardo Candida (b. 1790).

=== Candida Gonzaga ===
- Antonio Candida Gonzaga (1814–1874), Knight of the Order of Malta.
- Berardo Candida Gonzaga (1845–1920), son of the previous, genealogist.
- Riccardo Candida Gonzaga (1882–1959), son of the previous, director of the State Archives of Naples.
