= Concert Seasons of Bagheria =

Concert Seasons of Bagheria (Italian: Stagione Concertistica Città di Bagheria) is an initiative of the administration of the Italian city of Bagheria and Bagheria's Associazione Culturale Bequadro, launched in 2017. Its objective is to promote and popularize music of the classical, opera, jazz, gospel and other genres as a form of art through its presentation in monumental villas and churches of historical note.

Over the three seasons held as of 2019 under the art direction of composer Salvatore Di Blas, the concerts have been held at the following notable historical places in Bagheria: Villa Palagonia, Palazzo Butera, Villa Cattolica, Palazzo Cutò, Museo del giocattolo Pietro Piraino, and others, featuring performances of various musicians and musical ensembles from Teatro Massimo, Vincenzo Bellini Conservatory in Palermo, and others. The second season, in particular, went under the auspices of the Ministry of Cultural Heritage and Activities of Italy within the framework of the European Year of Cultural Heritage designated by the European Commission.
