= Italian Army ranks =

The Italian Army ranks are the ranks used by the Italian Army, the insignia for which are worn on epaulettes of shirts. Ranks in the Italian Army indicate both their officers' status and seniority, as dedicated members of the Italian militia. There are a total of 32 ranks in seven categories. These categories include: temporary service volunteers, permanent service volunteers, sergeants, marshals (NCOs), junior officers, senior officers, and generals.

In order to clearly show an officer's rank as a form of identification and authority, insignia patches are worn by all members of the Italian army. In each ranking category of officer, there is a trend in the symbols shown on their insignia patches. As soldiers gain ranks, the symbols on their insignia become more detailed and recognizable, such as adding an additional star or stripe per higher rank achieved.

== Current ranks ==
The chart below represents the Italian Army rank insignia used on the slip-on of winter service uniforms. The color of the uniforms is khaki.

Officers assigned to an acting position corresponding to a higher rank wear the insignia of that higher rank, with the highest star distinguished by red enamel trim. Similarly, officers temporarily filling a higher-ranking position in the absence of the incumbent display the insignia with the highest star shown in bronze.

The Italian rank system has a large number of junior NCO ranks. Several ranks (which are variations on corporal) have a "chosen" version of the rank, "chosen" having the same sense of "leading", as in the historic British Army appointment of "chosen man" (now called lance-corporal).

=== Officers ===
NATO code	OF-10	OF-9	OF-8	OF-7	OF-6	OF-5	OF-4	OF-3	OF-2		OF-1
	Officers
	Generals					Senior officers			Junior officers
Italian Army
Italian Army		Generale	Generale di Corpo d'Armata/ Tenente Generale	Generale di Divisione/ Maggior Generale	Generale di Brigata/ Brigadier Generale	Colonnello	Tenente Colonnello	Maggiore	Primo capitano	Capitano	Tenente	Sottotenente

==== Special ranks ====
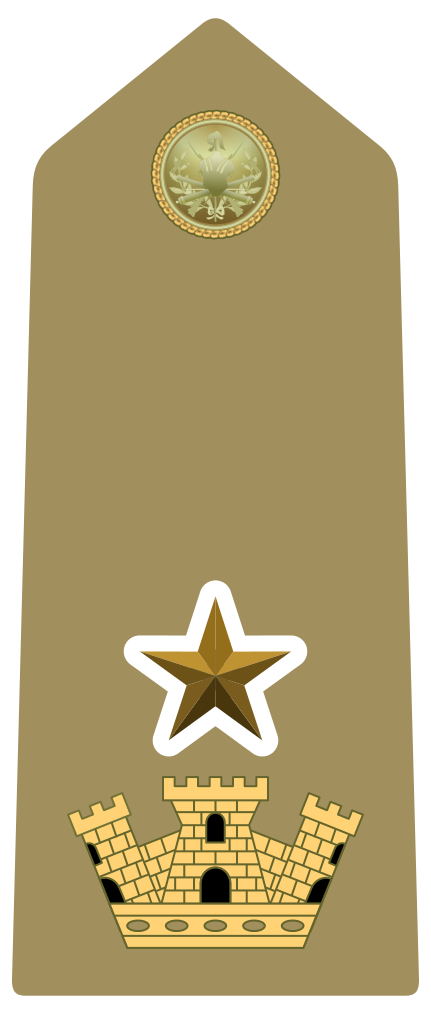
NATO Code	OF-8	OF-7	OF-6	OF-5	OF-4	OF-3	OF-2	OF-1
Special ranks

=== Enlisted ===
NATO code	OR-9			OR-8	OR-7		OR-6	OR-5	OR-4	OR-3	OR-2	OR-1
	Sub-officers								Volunteer ratings	Enlisted
	Marshals				Sergeants				Permanent service volunteers	Temporary service volunteers
Italian Army				Maresciallo capo / Maresciallo ordinario / Maresciallo					Gradutato aiutante / Primo graduato / Graduato capo / Graduato scelto / Graduato
Italian Army	Primo luogotenente	Luogotenente	Primo maresciallo	Maresciallo capo / Maresciallo ordinario / Maresciallo	Sergente maggiore aiutante	Sergente maggiore capo	Sergente maggiore	Sergente	Gradutato aiutante / Primo graduato / Graduato capo / Graduato scelto / Graduato	Caporal maggiore	Caporale	Soldato
Translation	First sub-lieutenant	Sub-lieutenant	First marshal	Chief marshal / Ordinary marshal / Marshal	Chief sergeant major adjutant	Chief sergeant major	Sergeant major	Sergeant	Graduate adjutant / First graduate / Chief graduate / Graduate select / Graduate	Corporal-major	Corporal	Private

=== History ===
Enlisted insignia saw no significant changes until 1973 when the chevrons were moved from the sleeve to the shoulder board. In 1997 the new ranks from 1°CM to CMCS were created for permanent service enlisted personnel, and the new insignia were created. in the same year, the rank of C.le Sc. was created as top rank for conscript personnel with corresponding shoulder board insignia.

=== Current usage ===
The rank of caporale is not a command grade and only results in a higher paygrade, and may be attained by conscript personnel. The ranks up to caporal maggiore may be attained by temporary service personnel. Higher ranks may only be attained by permanent service personnel. Sergeants generally have team command tasks, and are appointed in the rank only after several months in a training course.

The rank of soldato is used only for recruits and is substituted by the following, depending on the branch or service of their assignment

- Fante/Fan. (Infantryman)
- Alpino/Alp. (Mountain infantryman)
- Bersagliere/Bers. (Marksman, Rifleman)
- Paracadutista/Par. (Parachutist)
- Granatiere/Gra. (Grenadier)
- Lagunare/Lag. (Lagoon infantryman)
- Artigliere/Art. (Artilleryman, Gunner)
- Trasmettitore/Trs. (Signaller)
- Assistente di Sanità/Asa. (Medic)
- Cavaliere/Cav. (Cavalryman)
- Lanciere/Lanc. (Lancer)
- Dragone/Dra. (Dragoon)
- Carrista/Cr. (Tanker)
- Autiere/Aut. (Driver)
- Geniere/Gnr. (Pioneer, Sapper)
- Guastatore/Guast. (Combat Sapper)
- Incursore/Inc. (Special Forces Operator)

== History ==
Italian Army officers used to wear the ranks on the sleeve, like naval officers. Since 1946, insignia were changed in order to align with NATO regulations. In 1973 the system had the following slight change: the "bastion wall" was added to the stars for general officers, instead of the silver shoulder board; the civic crown was added to the stars for field officers, instead of a gold band on the edge of the epaulette or shoulder strap; the stars began to be placed near the edge of the epaulette instead of in the center. These changes were mostly intended to make insignia more easily recognizable on the field uniform.

=== Timeline of change ===
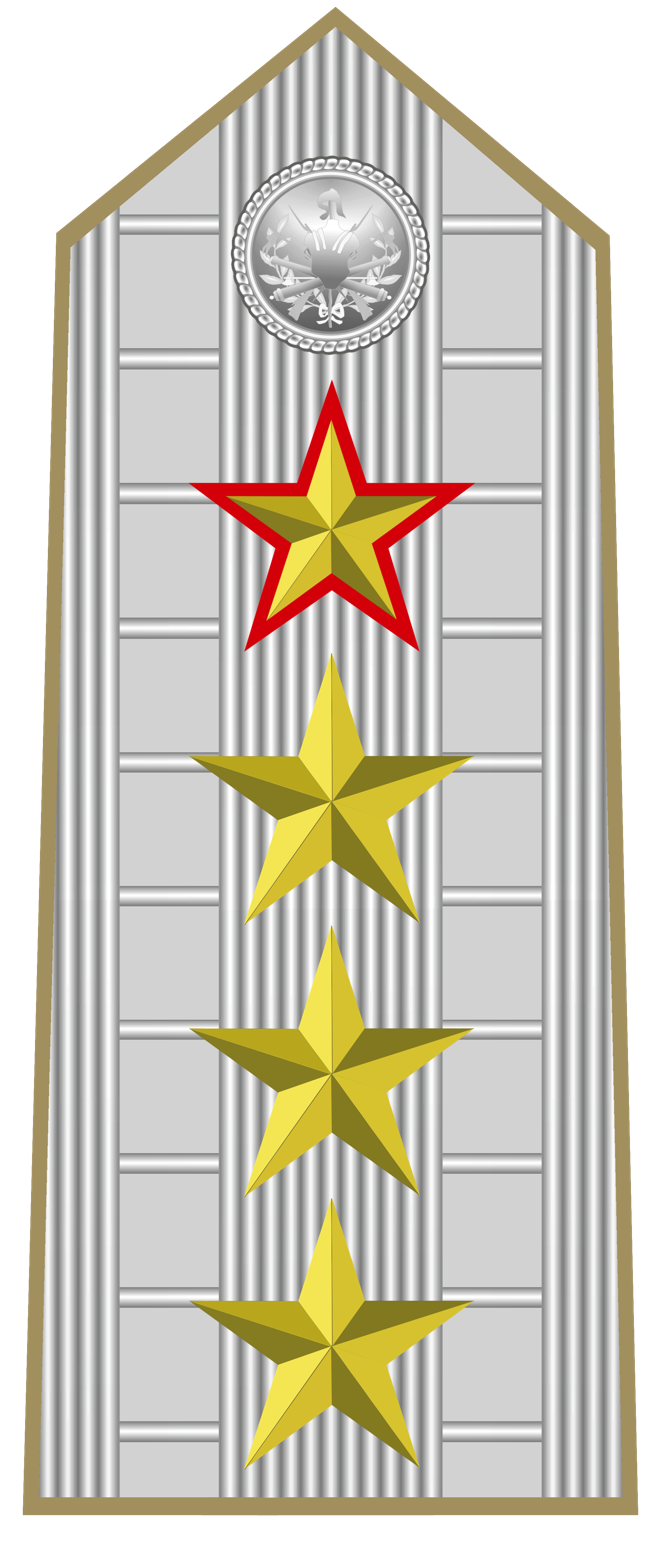
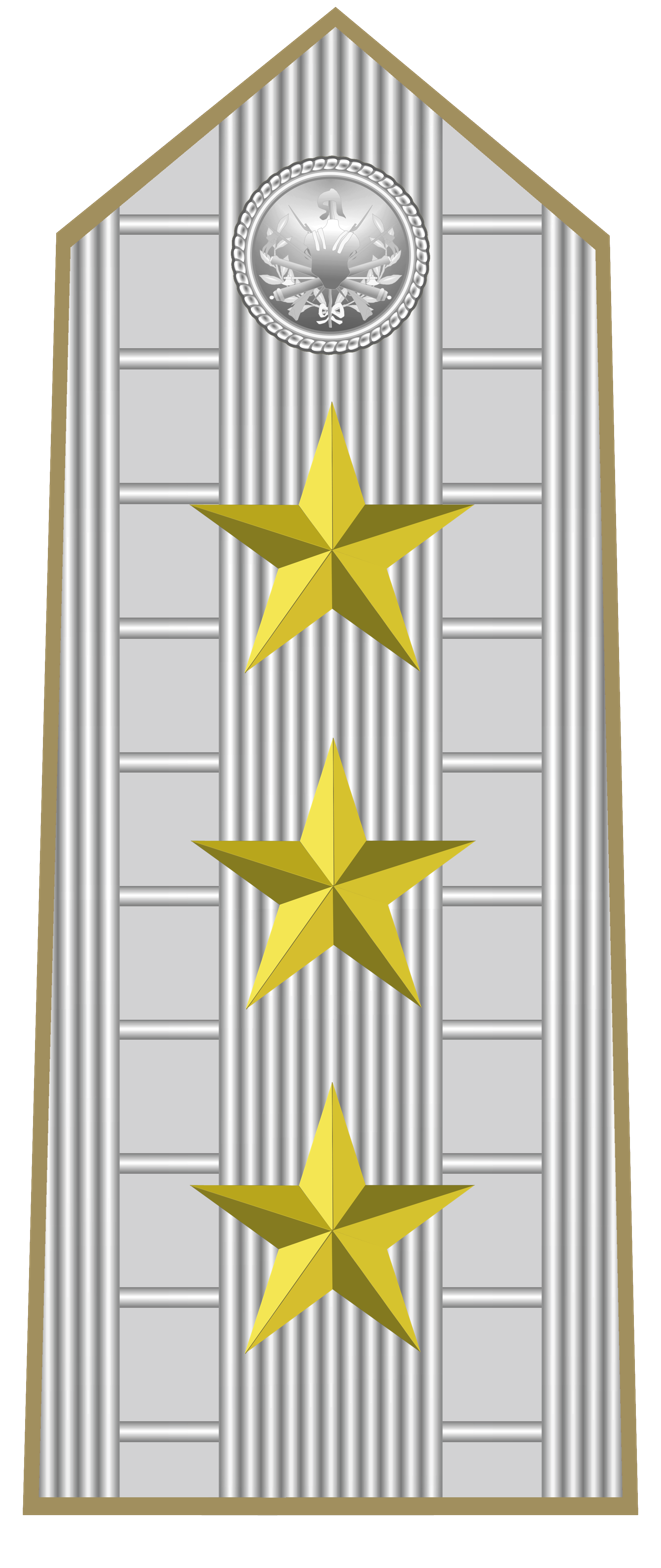
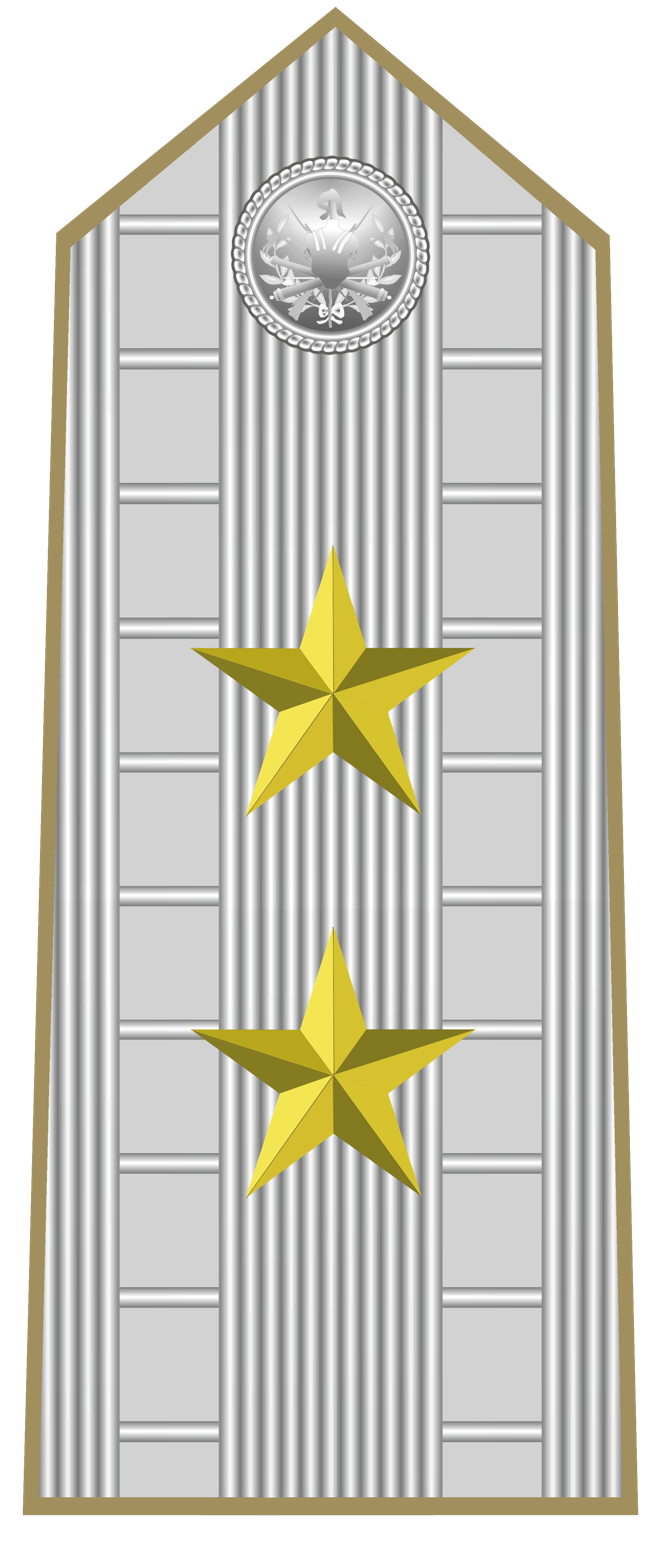
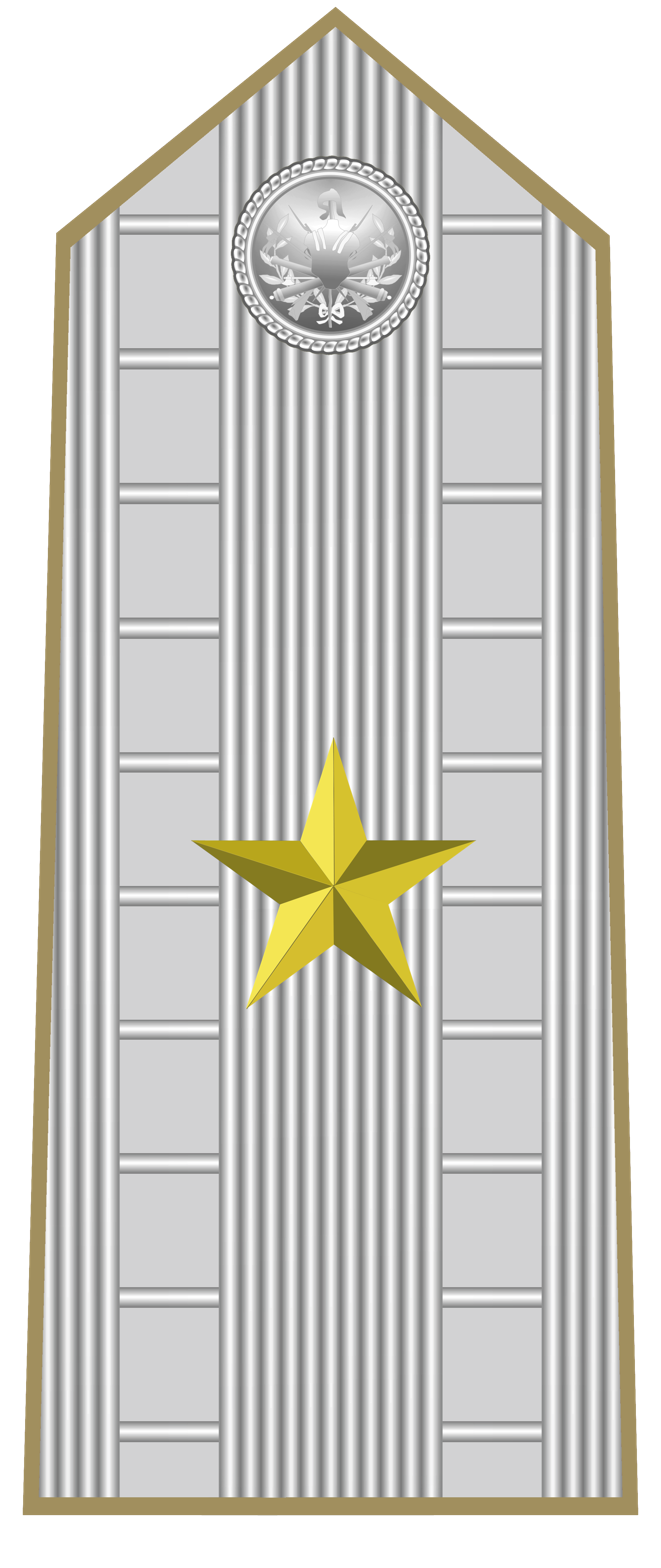
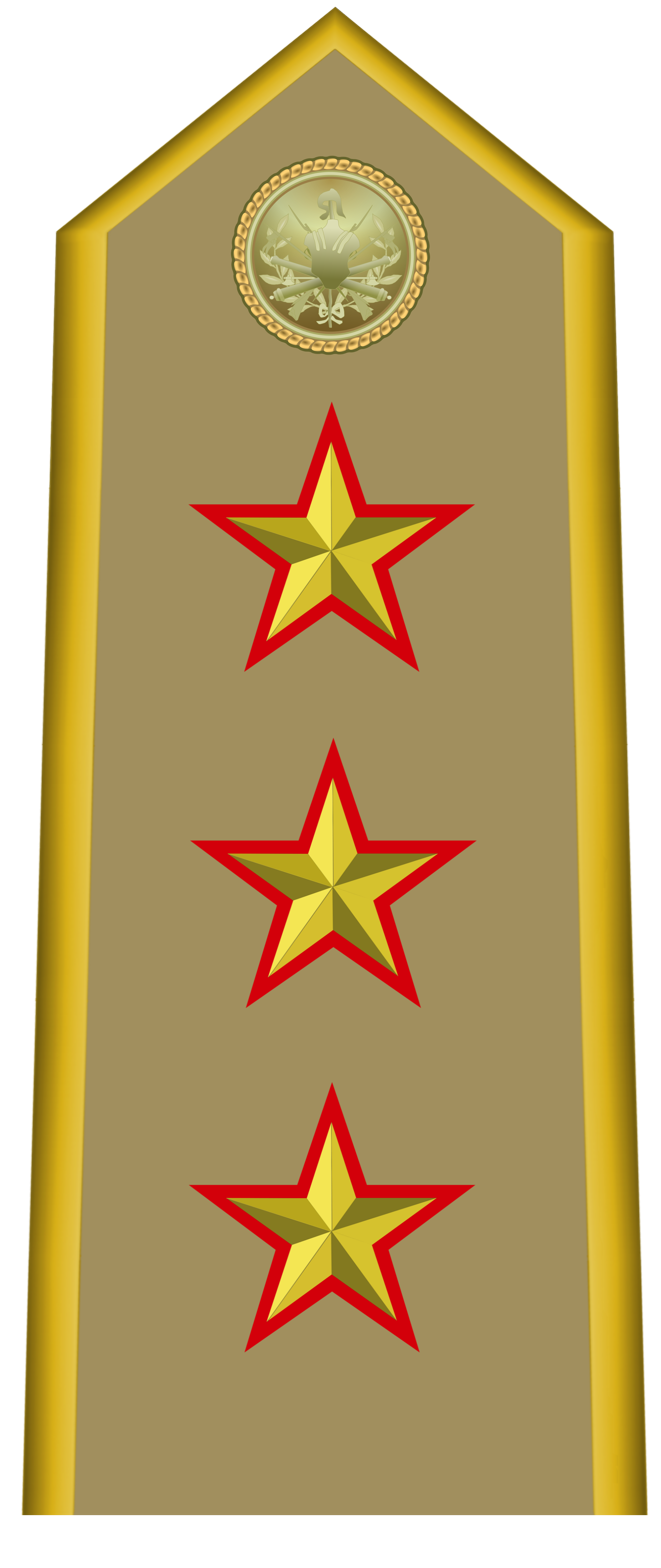
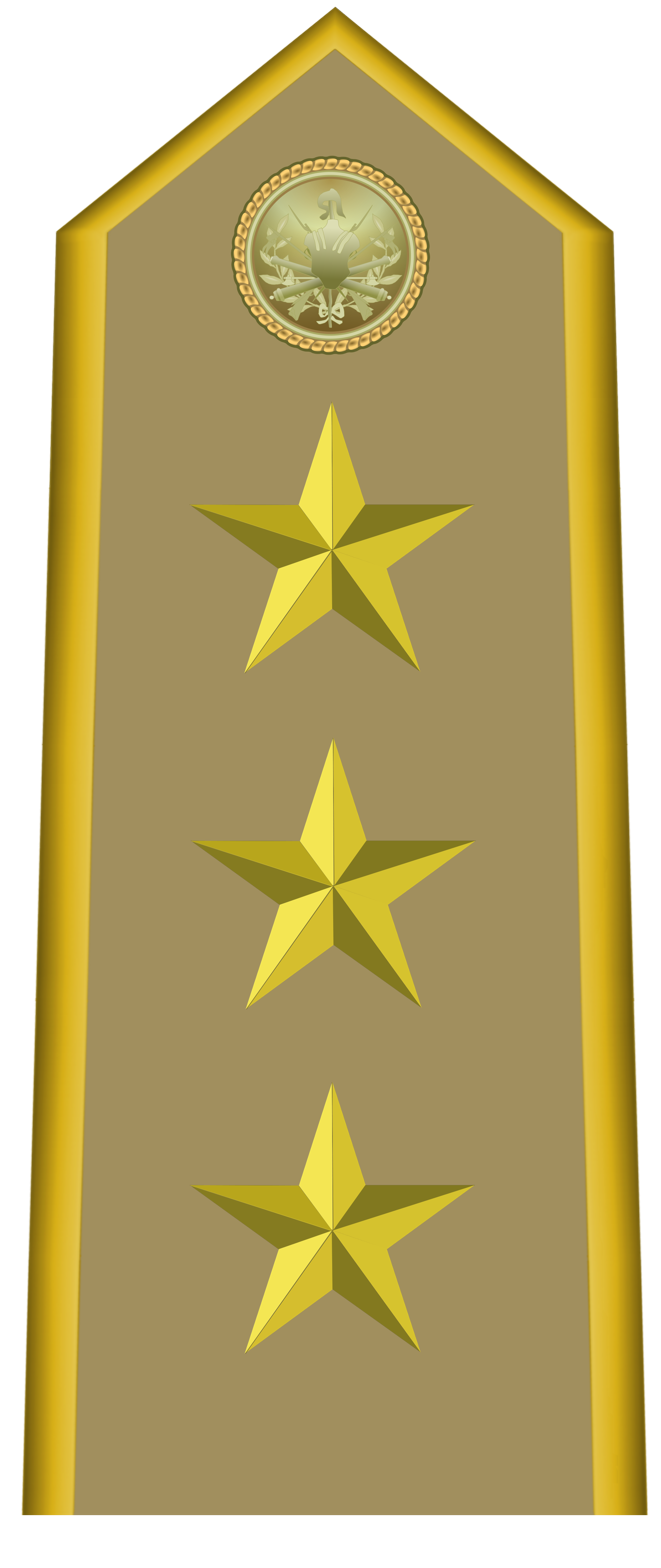
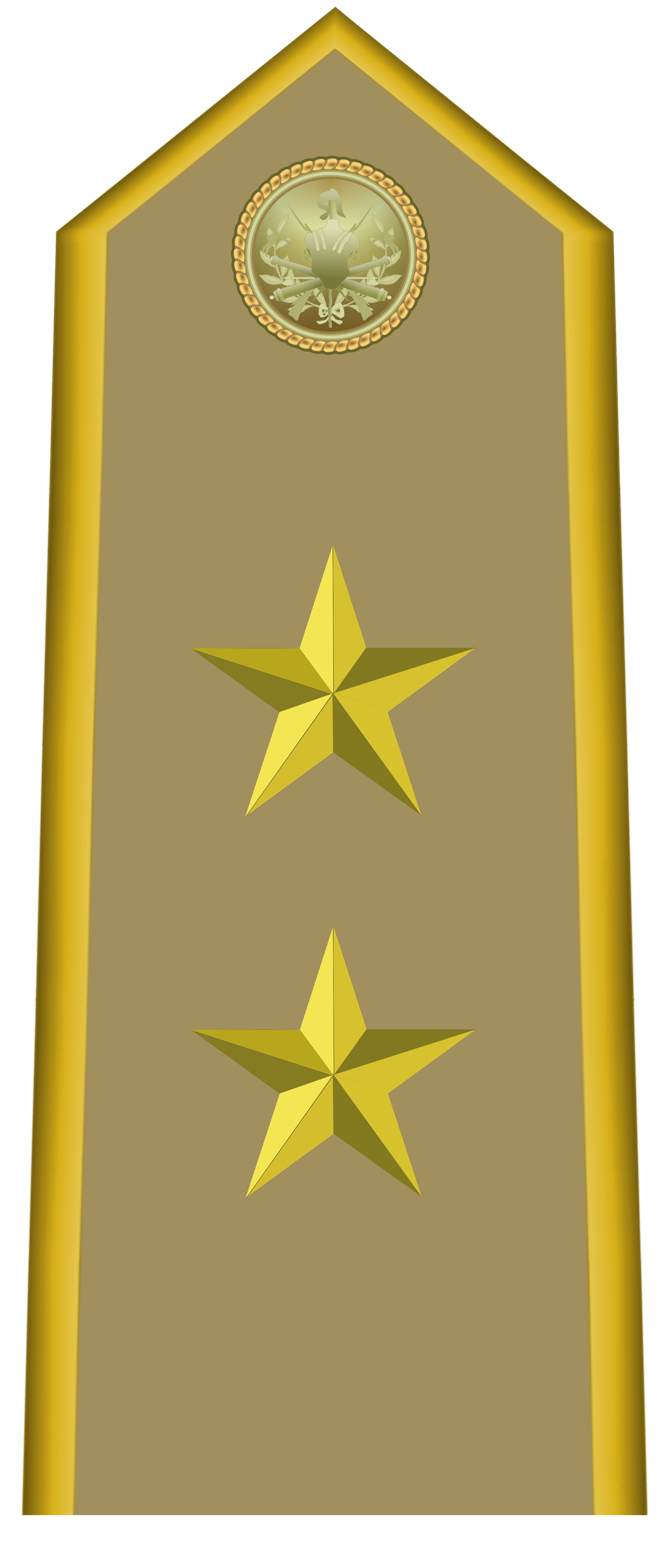
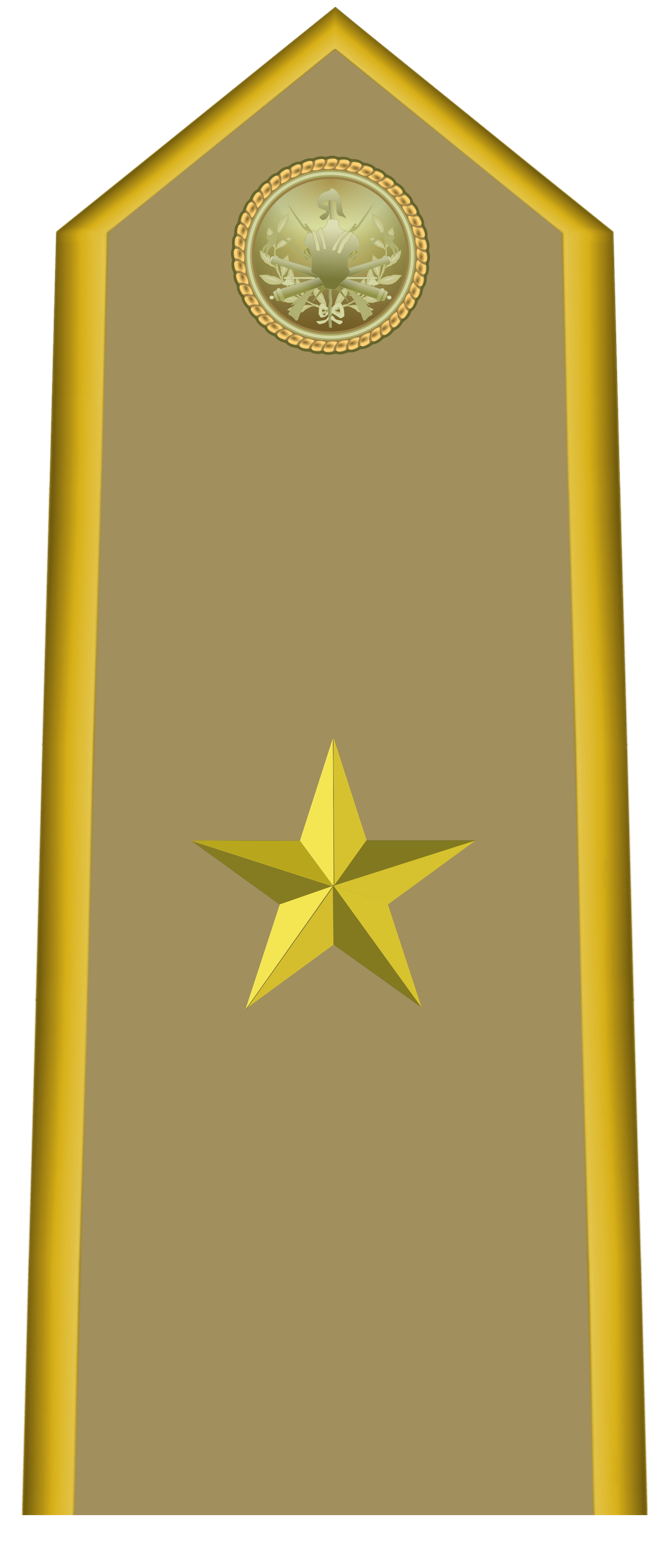
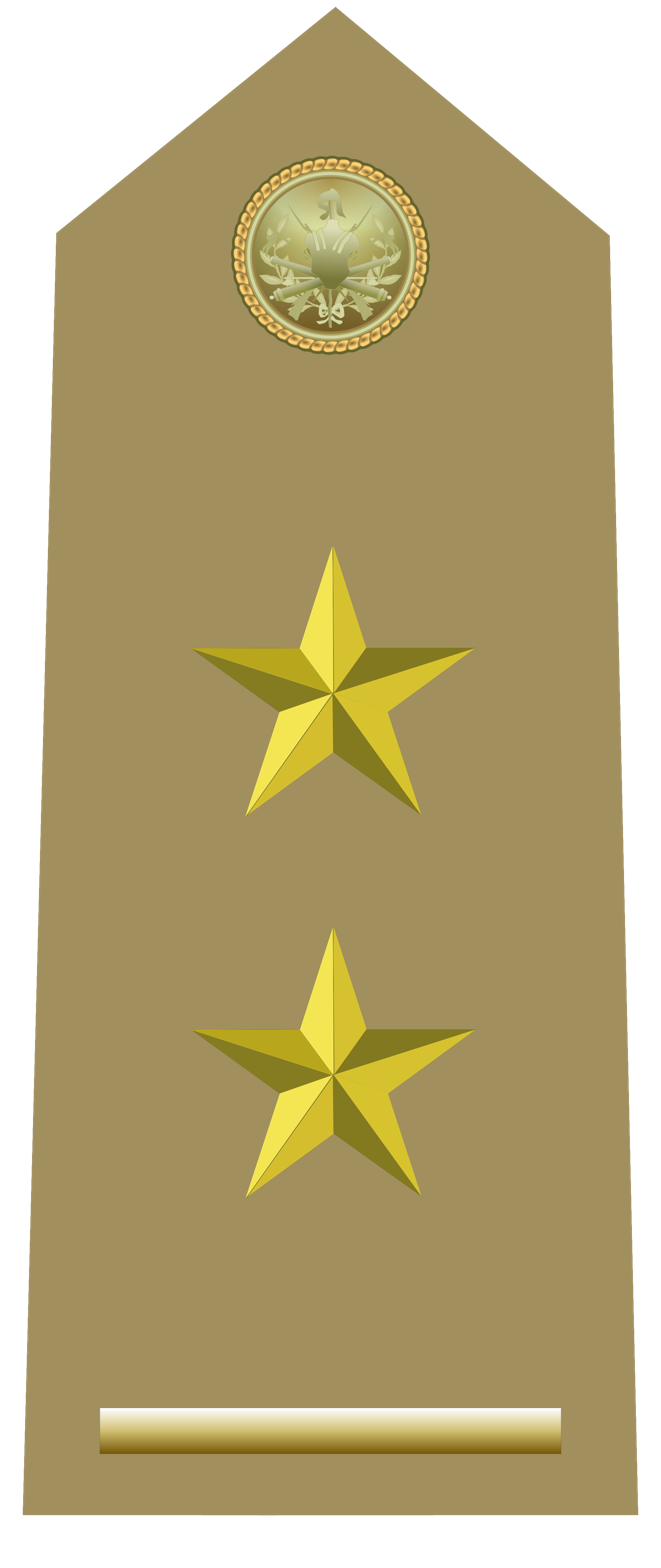
Rank group	General / flag officers				Senior officers				Junior officers
Italian Army (1947–1972)
Italian Army (1947–1972)	Generale di corpo d'armata con incarichi speciali	Generale di corpo d'armata	Generale di divisione	Generale di brigata	Colonnello comandante di reggimento	Colonnello	Tenente colonnello	Maggiore	Primo capitano	Capitano	Primo tenente	Tenente	Sottotenente
Italian Army (1972–?)

=== Enlisted ranks introduced in 2018 ===
Other rank insignia
NATO Code	OR-9	OR-7	OR-4
Shoulder board
Italian	Primo luogotenente q.s.	Sergente maggiore capo q.s.	Caporale maggiore capo scelto q.s.
English	Sub-lieutenant (special class)	Chief Sergeant Major (special class)	Senior Chief Corporal-Major (special class)

=== Enlisted name changes in 2022 ===
On 5 August 2022 the Caporale maggiore ranks in OR-4 were retitled as Graduato. Primo luogotenente q.s. and Sergente maggiore capo q.s. were also renamed.

NATO code	OR-9	OR-7	OR-4
Insignia
(1975–2018)				Caporale maggiore capo scelto	Caporale maggiore capo	Caporale maggiore scelto	Primo caporale maggiore
(2018–2022)	Primo luogotenente q.s.	Sergente maggiore capo q.s.	Caporale maggiore capo scelto q.s.	Caporale maggiore capo scelto	Caporale maggiore capo	Caporale maggiore scelto	Primo caporale maggiore
(2022–Present)	Primo luogotenente	Sergente maggiore aiutante	Gradutato aiutante	Primo graduato	Graduato capo	Graduato scelto	Graduato
