= Alessandro Filangieri, 4th Prince of Cutò =

Alessandro Filangieri, 4th Prince of Cutò (27 April 1696 – 22 February 1761), was an Italian Chief Justice of Palermo from 1725 to 1726.

== Early life ==
Alessandro was born on 27 April 1696 in Palermo in the Kingdom of Sicily then a Viceroyalty of the Spanish Empire. He was the son of Girolamo Filangieri, 3rd Prince of Cutò (1669–1719) and Costanza Gravina e Bonanno (1670–1746). His siblings included Donna Emanuela Filangieri (who married Domenico Corvino, Prince of Villanova) and Donna Giulia Filangieri (who married Giuseppe Bonanno).

His paternal grandparents were Alessandro Filangieri, 2nd Marquis of Lucca, and Giulia Platamone (a daughter of Francesco Platamone, 1st Prince of Cutò). His aunt, Donna Laura Filangieri, married Girolamo Giglio, Prince of Lascari and Torretta. His maternal grandparents were Ignazio Sebastiano Gravina, 4th Prince of Palagonia, and Maria Anna Bonanno, Marchioness of Delia.

== Career ==
Filangieri served as Chief Justice of Palermo (capitano di Giustizia di Palermo) from 1725 to 1726. His son, Girolamo, also served as Chief Justice from 1742 to 1743.

Alessandro commissioned the Baroque-style Palazzo Filangeri-Cutò located on via Maqueda 26 in the ancient quarter of Albergaria of central Palermo. Construction lasted over 70 years and was not completed until 1760, shortly before his death. The design of the palazzo is attributed to a priest, Giacomo Amato. The main internal staircase is attributed to Giovanni del Frago.

== Personal life ==
Filangieri was married to Francesca di Giovanni e Morra (1699–1768), a daughter of Domenico di Giovanni, Prince of Trecastagne and Isabella Morra, Princess of Buccheri and of Castrorao. Together, they were the parents of:

- Girolamo Filangieri, 6th Prince of Cutò (1714–1777), a Field Marshal of the Bourbon Army; he married Bianca La Farina San Martino di Ramondetta, a daughter of Luigi La Farina, 3rd Marquis of Madonia. After her death in 1746, he married Aurora Morso Bonanno.

The Prince died on 22 February 1761 in Santa Margherita di Belice.

=== Descendants ===
Through his son Girolamo, he was a grandfather of Alessandro Filangieri, 6th Prince of Cutò.
