= Giordano Filangieri II =

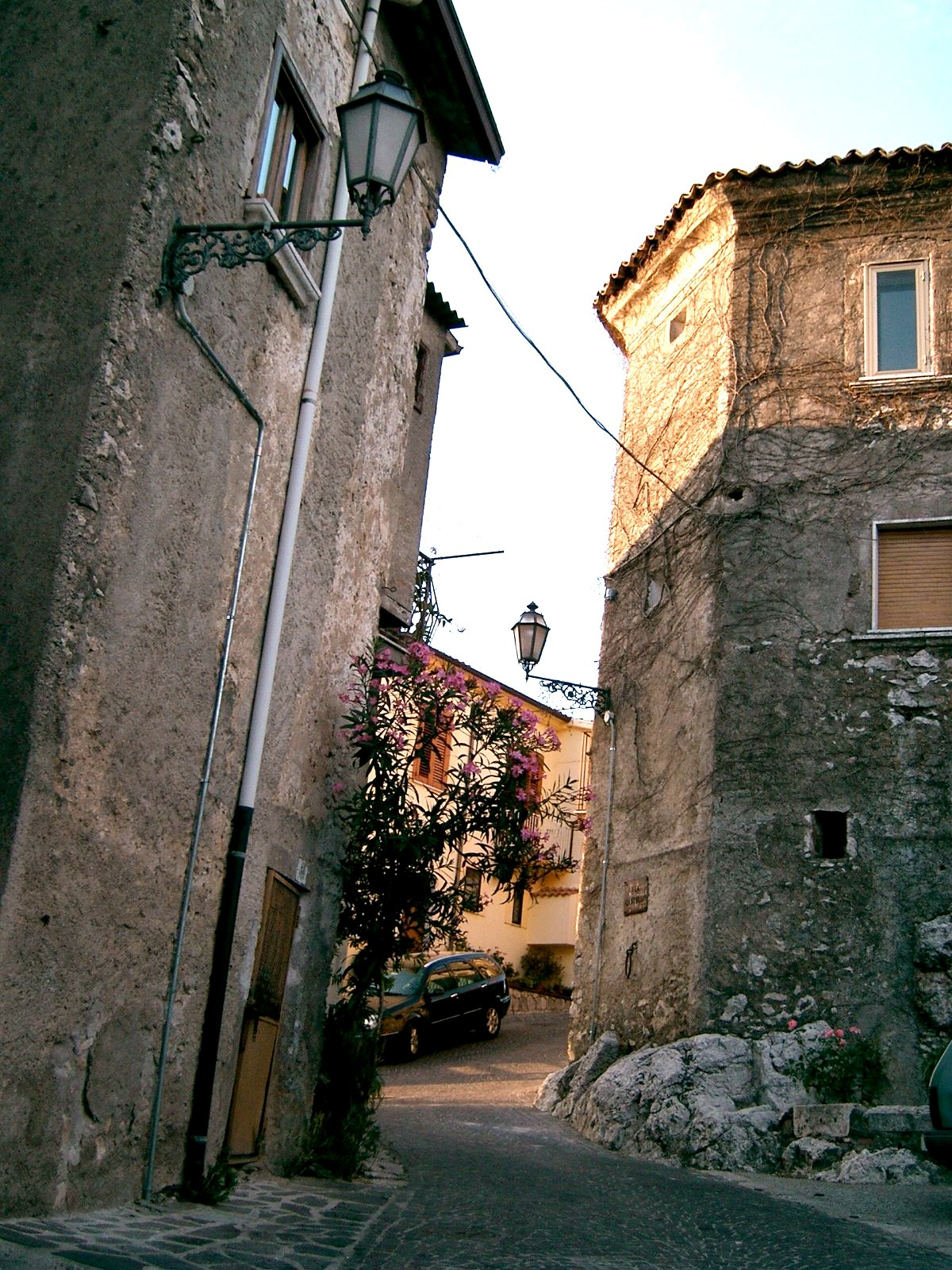
Quadrangular tower constructed during the Filangieri rule at Candida, possibly by Giordano

Giordano Filangieri (born 1195/1200) was a Neapolitan nobleman, the son of Giordano, lord of Nocera, and Oranpiassa, and younger brother of Riccardo. Both he and his brother became involved in the high politics of the Kingdom of Sicily.

Giordano inherited Arianello on his father's death in 1227. In 1231 he replaced his brother as imperial marshal (imperialis marescalcus) of the kingdom. Early in 1234 he married the sister of Aldoino (or Alduino), count of Ischia Maggiore and Geraci Siculo. In November he received from his new brother-in-law, in a testament redacted at Foggia, the lordships of Candida and Lapio in the eastern Principate, and the name "Aldoino" entered the name pool of the Filangieri family. In 1239 he held the captaincy of Calabria, Sicily, and all land south of the Porta Roseto, while Andrea di Cicala, another brother-in-law of Aldoino, held the captaincy north of the Porta Roseto. On 24 January 1240 Giordano was recalled by the Emperor Frederick II.

The rest of his life was marked by conflicts and feuds. In 1244 he was forced to launch a suit against his vassals. In 1245 he was the victim of a lawsuit by the magister defensarum, the master of the defences of the kingdom, for building a castle at Corigliano. Giordano left two sons, Aldoino, who inherited Candida, and Lotterio, who inherited Senerchia.
