= Marshal (Italy) =

Military rank in the Italian Armed Forces

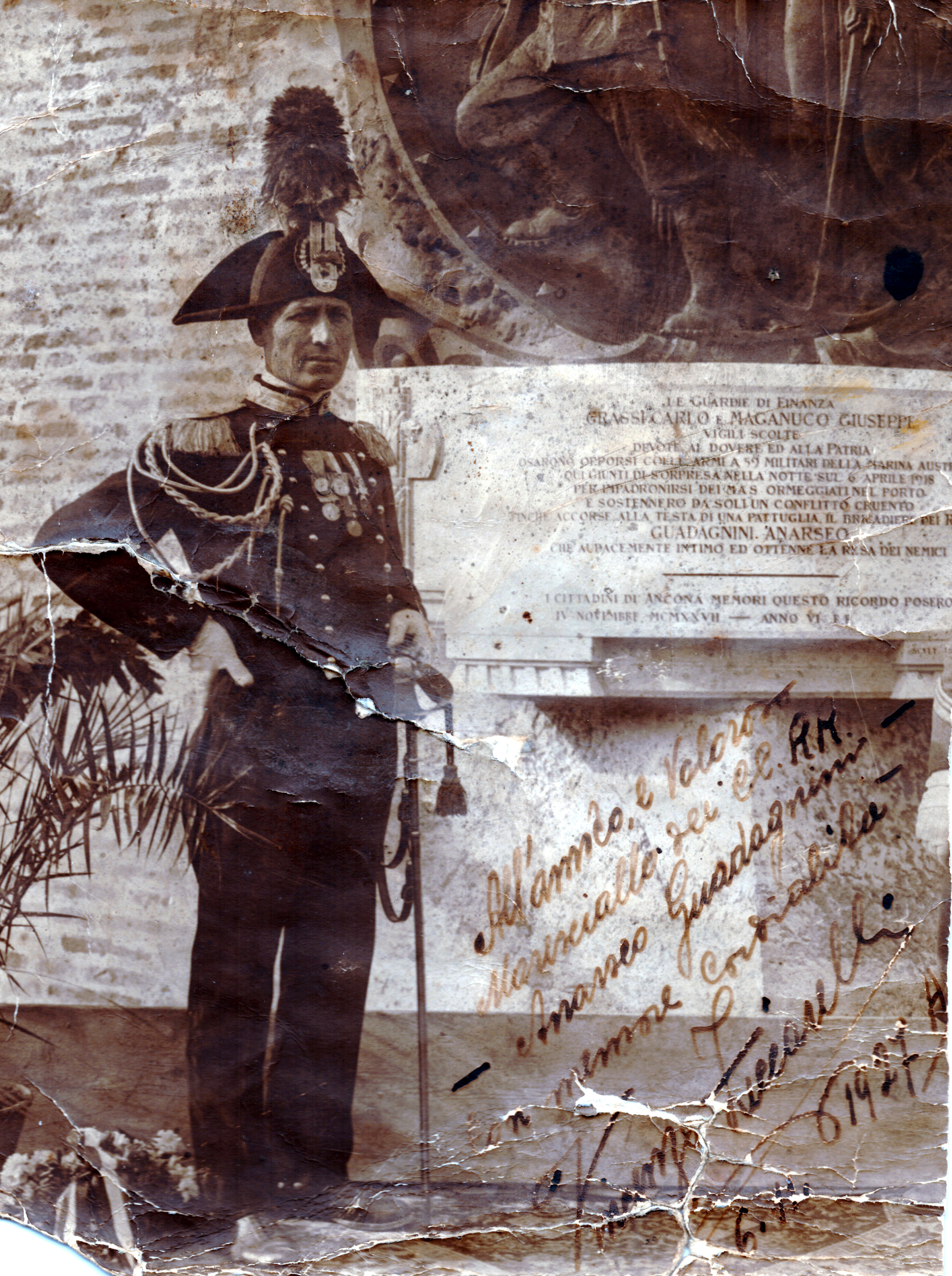
Maresciallo Anarseo Guadagnini, 1927

The Italian military rank of maresciallo ([mareʃˈʃallo]; marshal) is classified as a "sub-officer" and is the highest rank of non-commissioned officer in the Italian Armed Forces. It is higher than the rank of sergeant but lower than that of ensign/second lieutenant. There are from three to five grades within the rank, according to the different branches of the armed forces. The rank is achieved through merit or attending the Scuola Allievi Marescialli (School of Student Marshals). Marshal is an intermediate rank of the armed forces which is currently granted to NCOs with the training and technical competence to carry out specialised executive roles, and to command smaller and technically complex units. The rank of maresciallo also exists in the Corps of Gendarmerie of San Marino.

== History ==
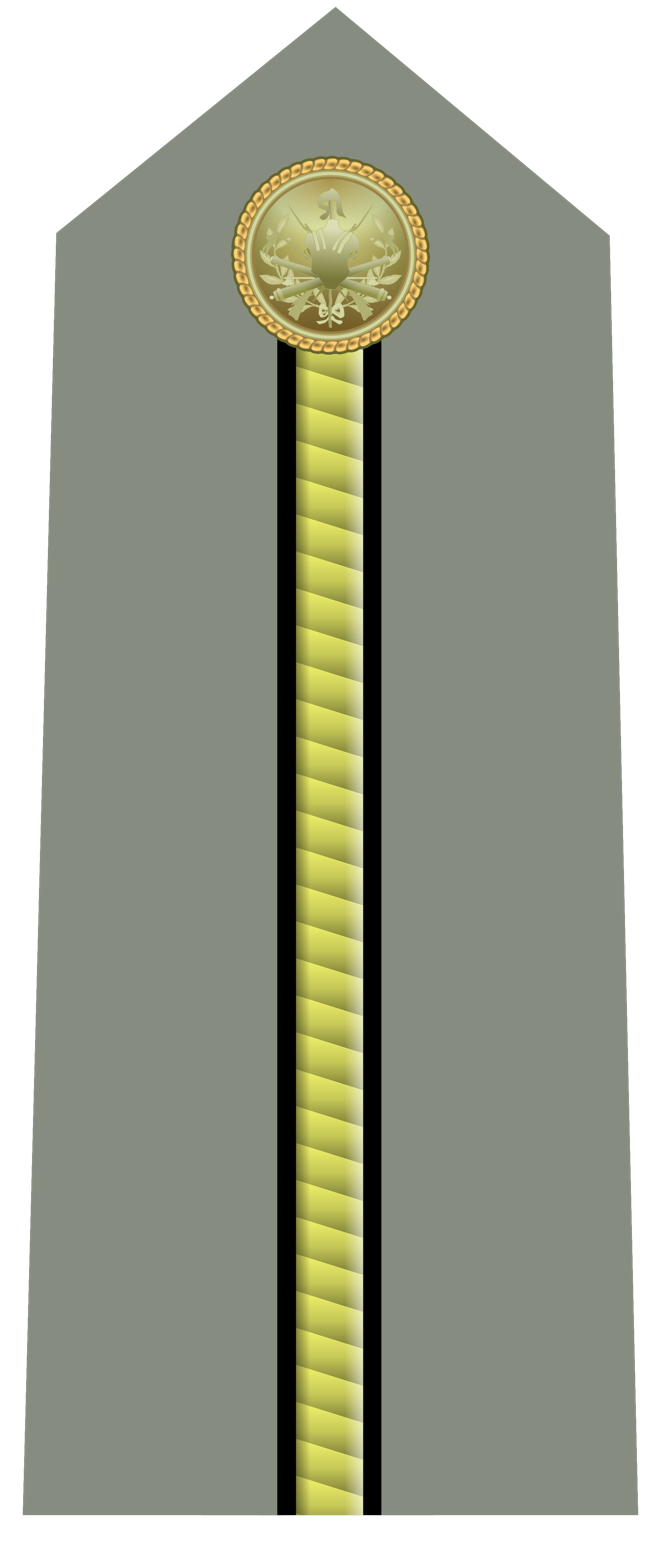
Insignia of Maresciallo ordinario, pre-WWI

The rank of marshal in Italy was initially provided only as the marescialli d'alloggio (lodging marshals) of the Royal Carabinieri. In 1902 the rank was established for the Royal Army. The rank was unique and higher than that of furiere maggiore (senior quartermaster). Subsequently in 1907 the ranks of quartermaster and quartermaster were abolished and the rank of marshal was divided into three classes: 1st, 2nd and 3rd class marshal who were then renamed Maresciallo maggiore, and Maresciallo ordinario, respectively. The badges of rank were regulated only on January 22, 1907 by a circular. In the Regia Marina (Royal Navy), the equivalent ranks were those of capo di 1ª, 2ª e 3ª classe.

At the entrance of Italy in World War One, the ranks of maresciallo ordinario, maresciallo capo and maresciallo Maggiore existed and were retitled as Maresciallo di Compagnia, Maresciallo di Battaglione, and Maresciallo di Reggimento, In 1916 the degree of Aiutanti di Battaglia (Battalion Adjutant) was established, reachable from both the non-commissioned officers and troops solely for war merits, regardless of the previously covered degree.

Until 1972 the marshals were framed in three hierarchical levels: maresciallo ordinario, maresciallo capo and maresciallo maggiore and had a distinctive respectively one, two or three mottled golden stripes of black placed vertically on the shoulder straps. In 1972, maresciallo maggiore aiutante was added, above the other degrees, but always subordinate to the degree of aiutante di battaglia. This degree was distinguished as it was reachable by promotion to choice and not for seniority, and had the same distinctive of Marshal Maggiore, but with the mottled rods of red. After 1972 for all marshal ranks were reoriented horizontally.

== Modern ranks ==
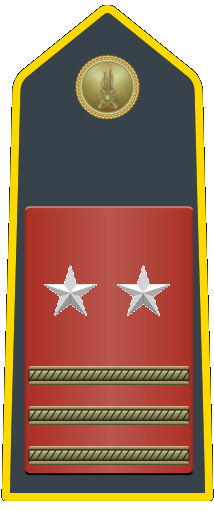
NATO code	OR-9			OR-8
Italian Army
Italian Army	Primo luogotenente	Luogotenente	Primo maresciallo	Maresciallo capo	Maresciallo ordinario	Maresciallo
Italian Navy
Italian Navy	Primo luogotenente q.s. (Note: q.s. - (qualifica speciale - special rank))	Luogotenente	Primo maresciallo	Capo di prima classe	Capo di seconda classe	Capo di terza classe
Italian Air Force
Italian Air Force	Primo luogotenente q.s.	Luogotenente	Primo maresciallo	Maresciallo di prima classe	Maresciallo di seconda classe	Maresciallo di terza classe
Carabinieri
Carabinieri	Luogotenente "carica speciale"	Luogotenente	Primo maresciallo	Maresciallo di prima classe	Maresciallo di seconda classe	Maresciallo di terza classe
Guardia di Finanza
Guardia di Finanza	Luogotenente cariche speciali	Luogotenente s.u.p.s. (Note: sostituto ufficiale di pubblica sicurezza luogotenente)	Maresciallo aiutante s.u.p.s.	Maresciallo capo	Maresciallo ordinario	Maresciallo

== See also ==
- Marshal of Italy
- First Marshal of the Empire
- Italian Army ranks
- Italian Navy ranks
