= Palazzo Filangeri-Cutò, Palermo =

Filangeri-Cutò Palace
- Palazzo Filangeri-Cutò
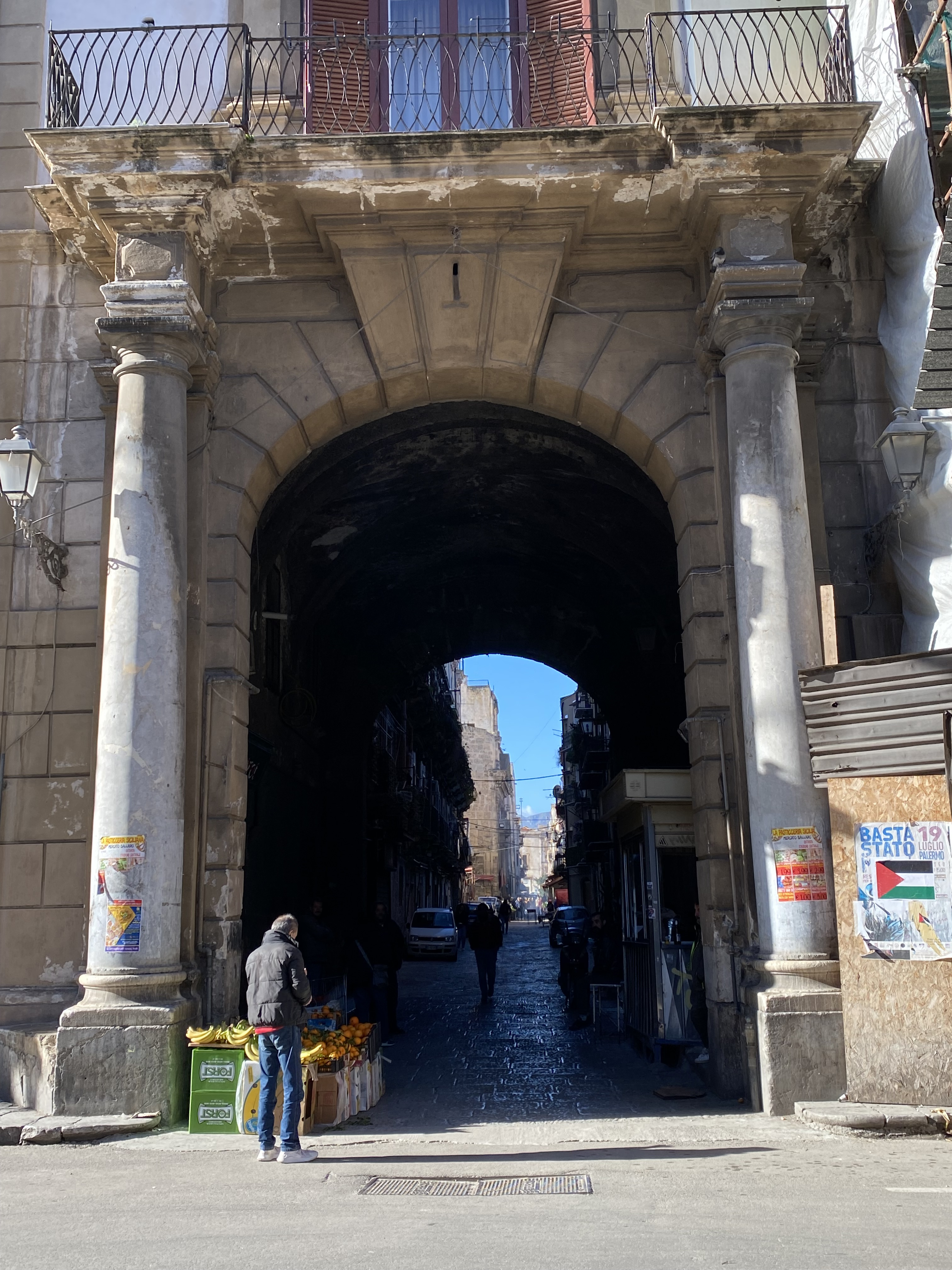
- Façade of the palace. Via Maqueda
- Interactive map of the Filangeri-Cutò Palace area
- Alternative names: Palazzo Filangieri-Cuto

General information
- Architectural style: Baroque
- Location: Palermo, Italy, Italy
- Coordinates: 38.11086°N 13.36453°E

The Palazzo Filangeri-Cutò is a Baroque-style aristocratic palace located on via Maqueda 26 in the ancient quarter of Albergaria of central Palermo, region of Sicily, Italy. Once the urban palace of a wealthy and prominent family, since the 19th century the palace has been subdivided into numerous apartments and businesses, and in dire need of restoration.

== History ==
The Filangieri family had been prominent in Sicily since the time of the Norman invasion. Alessandro I Filangieri e Bologna, born in 1664, had inherited the title of Baron of Miserendino, but upon marrying Giulia Platamone e Sisini, he had acquired the title of Prince of Cutò. Alessandro commissioned the large palace in the small town of Santa Margherita in Belice. His grandson, the 4th prince of Cutò, Alessandro II Filangieri e Gravina (1696-1761), commissioned this palace in Palermo. Construction lasted over 70 years and was not completed till 1760, the design is attributed to a priest, Giacomo Amato. The main internal staircase is attributed to Giovanni del Frago.

The last Filangieri to own this palace was Giovanna Nicoletta Filangieri (1850-1891) 9th Princess of Cutò. She also inherited the palace in Santa Margherita. She married Lucio Mastrogiovanni Tasca, Count of Almerita (1842-1918), and had five children. The eldest, Beatrice Mastrogiovanni Tasca Filangeri, married the Prince of Lampedusa, and was the mother of the famous author, Giuseppe Tomasi di Lampedusa.

The Filangieri, however, had been closely allied with the Bourbon monarchy and lost prestige after their overthrow by Garibaldi in 1860. The palace was sold in the late 19th century to the Baron Cirino di Nicosia, who subdivided the property into further owners. The large library once housed in the palace, and in 1838 was donated by Prince Nicolo to form part of the Biblioteca Comunale of Palermo. Alessandro was also reputed to have a prominent art collection, since dispersed.

== Description ==
The main facade of the once large palace faces Via Maqueda with three similar portals, each consisting of a rounded arch flanked by two protruding large grey marble doric columns. The palace has numerous balconies supported by brackets and fronted by iron grill railings. The central arcade creates an arch (Arco de Cuto) over a small street/alleyway, via Chappara al Carmine, that leads to the Ballarò open market than runs behind the palace.
