= Lotterio Filangieri (died 1302) =

Lotterio (or Lothair) Filangieri (died 1302) was a south Italian nobleman, the son of Giordano II of the Filangieri family, from whom he inherited the fief of Senerchia. Lotterio held a string of high posts in the Kingdom of Sicily during the final decades of the thirteenth century and opening years of the fourteenth.

He succeeded his brother, Aldoino, as justiciar of the Terra di Bari in 1283. In 1290 he was named "captain of war" (capitano di guerra) in the Basilicata by Charles II. From 1300 until his death he was the justiciar of the Terra d'Otranto.
