= Palazzo Cutò =

Coordinates: 38°05′21″N 13°30′28″E

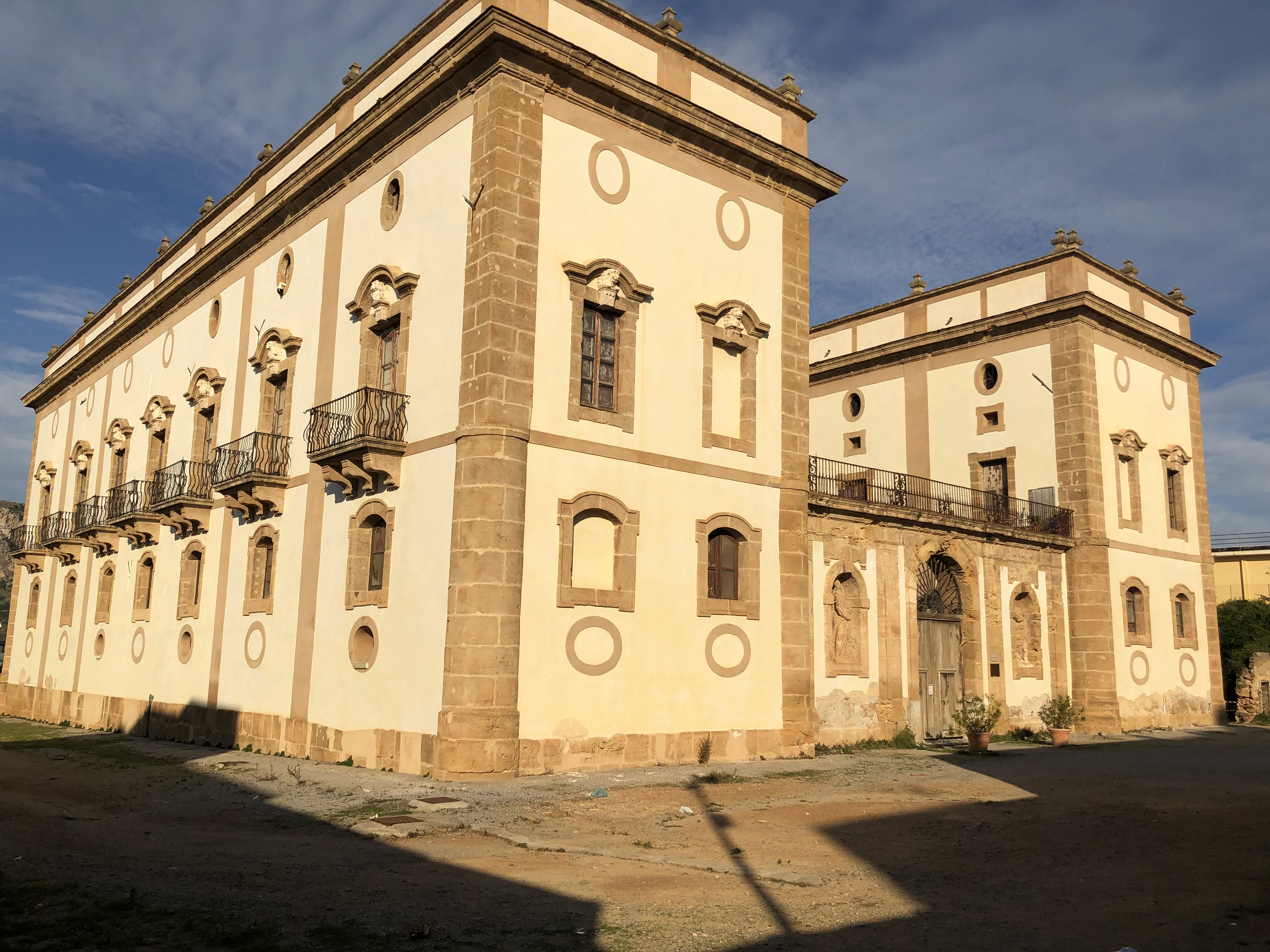
Palazzo Cutò in Bagheria

Palazzo Cutò or Palazzo Aragona di Cutò is one of the large villas built in the early eighteenth century in Bagheria in the Province of Palermo near the ancient Via Consolare. Today it is located near the city's railway station.

== History ==
Villa Aragona (today better known in Bagheria as Palazzo Cutò) was built between 1712 and 1716 by Luigi Onofrio Naselli, Prince of Aragon, as a summer residence. The project was developed by the architect Giuseppe Mariani. In 1803 the villa was purchased by Alessandro Filangieri, 6th Prince of Cutò, and in this passage it became necessary to replace the family insignia: the monogram PC, Prince of Cutò, appears today on the main gate. In the early twentieth century, among the owners were Alessandro Tasca di Cutò, known as the Red Prince for his socialist sympathies, and Giuseppe Tomasi di Lampedusa, the future author of The Leopard and also related to the Filangeri di Cutò on his mother's side.

In 1923, Giuseppe Tomasi sold the villa to some non-aristocratic families from Bagheria (Di Bernardo and then Carollo) who retained ownership until 1987, the year in which the entire monumental complex was purchased by the Municipality.

Since 1983 the Municipality has pursued a program of acquisition and recovery which, until 1993, was directed by Antonio Belvedere, an architect from Bagheria. Since 1993 the works have been continued directly by the Superintendency of Cultural Heritage and by municipal technicians who are responsible for all the arrangement of the internal spaces. Currently the building has become the seat of the Francesco Scaduto Municipal Library (established in 1956 by mayor Silvestre Cuffaro), of the Pietro Piraino Toy Museum and with a thirty-year loan for use contract it is also the seat of the Michele Mancini University Multimedia Laboratory of the University of Palermo.

=== Architecture ===
The building is composed of a massive quadrangular structure, on the top of which there is a large belvedere used in the past as a meeting place for the local nobility; in fact, theatrical performances were staged there or people gathered there to watch the fireworks of the festival of Santa Rosalia. The palace is decorated on the pediment by two allegorical statues placed inside niches, seriously mutilated over the years. Inside we find a large staircase for access to the main floor, composed of two ramps; this differentiates it from other noble summer homes that instead had access via external stairs. There are also frescoes inside dating back to 1726, attributed to the painter Guglielmo Borremans; they show scenes of mythological life and scenes from the Bible. The majolica floor of a room in the villa is located in the Diocesan Museum of Palermo.
