= Fausto Picone =

Italian politician (born 1973)

President of the Province of Avellino
- Incumbent
- Assumed office 6 June 2026
- Preceded by: Rizieri Buonopane

Mayor of Candida
- Incumbent
- Assumed office 26 May 2014
- Preceded by: Raffaele Petrosino

Personal details
- Born: 5 June 1973 (age 53) Candida, Campania, Italy
- Party: Italia Viva

Fausto Picone (born 5 June 1973) is an Italian politician serving as president of the Province of Avellino since 2026. He has served as mayor of Candida since 2014.

In June 2026, Picone was elected president of the Province of Avellino, supported by Italia Viva, Forza Italia and a group of Democratic Party (PD) administrators. He defeated incumbent Rizieri Buonopane, who was backed by part of the PD, the Five Star Movement and the Socialists, with 60.43% of the weighted vote against 39.57%.
