= Alberta De Simone =

Italian politician (born 1948)

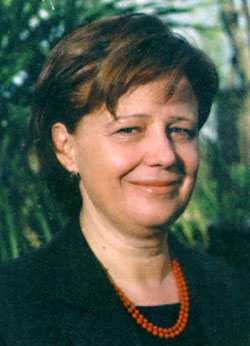

Member of the Chamber of Deputies
- In office 1994–2006
- Constituency: Campania 2

President of the Province of Avellino
- In office 14 June 2004 – 8 July 2008
- Preceded by: Francesco Maselli
- Succeeded by: Cosimo Sibilia

Mayor of Atripalda
- In office 7 January 1993 – 19 November 1993

Personal details
- Born: 8 May 1948 (age 78) Montella, Province of Avellino, Italy
- Party: Democratic Party of the Left; Democrats of the Left; Democratic Party
- Occupation: Teacher

Alberta De Simone (born 8 May 1948) is an Italian politician of the Democratic Party. She served as mayor of Atripalda in 1993, president of the Province of Avellino from 2004 to 2009 and was a member of the Chamber of Deputies during the 12th, 13th and 14th legislatures.
