= List of presidents of the Province of Avellino =

President of the Province of Avellino
- Presidente della Provincia di Avellino
- Incumbent; Fausto Picone since 6 June 2026
- Term length: 4 years
- Formation: 1889

The president of the Province of Avellino is the head of the provincial government in Avellino, Campania, Italy. The president oversees the administration of the province, coordinates the activities of the municipalities, and represents the province in regional and national matters.

Since June 2026, the office has been held by Fausto Picone of Italia Viva.

== List ==
=== Presidents of the Provincial Deputation (1889–1927) ===
No.	Portrait	Name	Term of office		Party
No.	Portrait	Name	Start	End	Party
1		Giuseppe Rega	1889	1890	
2		Pompilio Barra	1891	1892	
3		Onofrio Trione	1893	1916	
4		Francesco Tozzoli	1917	?	

=== Presidents of the Province (1952–present) ===
No.	Portrait	Name	Term of office		Party
No.	Portrait	Name	Start	End	Party
		Vincenzo Barra	5 July 1952	6 August 1961	Christian Democracy
		Angelo Scalpati	1961	1964	Christian Democracy
		Raffaele Ingrisano	1965	1966	Christian Democracy
		Giovanni Clemente	1966	1970	Christian Democracy
		Giuseppe Gargani	15 September 1970	16 February 1972	Christian Democracy
		Antonio Cocozza	16 February 1972	30 September 1972	Christian Democracy
–		Giuseppe Basile (Prefectural commissioner)	30 September 1972	26 February 1973	—
		Fedele Gizzi	26 February 1973	3 May 1973	Christian Democracy
–		Raffaele Sbrescia (Prefectural commissioner)	3 May 1973	30 January 1975	—
		Ciriaco Cardillo	30 January 1975	November 1975	Christian Democracy
		Antonio Cocozza	November 1975	11 October 1976	Christian Democracy
		Michele Giannattasio	11 October 1976	February 1978	Italian Socialist Party
		Angelo Di Stasio	February 1978	June 1978	Christian Democracy
		Ciriaco Cardillo	June 1978	13 August 1980	Christian Democracy
		Silvestre Petrillo	13 August 1980	15 September 1980	Italian Democratic Socialist Party
		Silvestre Petrillo	November 1981	1985	Italian Democratic Socialist Party
		Giacomo Carpenito	1985	20 May 1987	Italian Socialist Party
		Francesco Iapicca	20 May 1987	11 March 1988	Italian Democratic Socialist Party
		Benito Sepe	11 March 1988	18 July 1990	Italian Socialist Party
		Carmine Ragano	18 July 1990	8 August 1992	Italian Socialist Party
		Valerio Capone	8 August 1992	10 May 1993	Italian Socialist Party
		Rosa Anna Maria Repole	30 June 1993	24 April 1995	Christian Democracy
		Luigi Anzalone	8 May 1995	28 June 1999	Democratic Party of the Left
		Francesco Maselli	28 June 1999	14 June 2004	Independent (centre-left)
		Alberta De Simone	14 June 2004	8 July 2008	Democrats of the Left / Democratic Party
–		Vincenzo Madonna (Prefectural commissioner)	8 July 2008	8 June 2009	—
		Cosimo Sibilia	8 June 2009	12 February 2013	The People of Freedom
–		Raffaele Coppola (Extraordinary commissioner)	12 February 2013	11 October 2014	—
		Domenico Gambacorta	11 October 2014	31 October 2018	Forza Italia
		Domenico Biancardi	31 October 2018	19 December 2021	Independent (centre-right)
		Rizieri Buonopane	19 December 2021	6 June 2026	Democratic Party
		Fausto Picone	6 June 2026	Incumbent	Italia Viva

== Sources ==
- "Storia amministrativa dell'ente". Ministero dell'Interno.
- "Provincia, Gambacorta s'insedia a Palazzo Caracciolo". Giornale L'Irpinia (in Italian).
- Menichini, Piera (2005). "I presidenti delle Province dall'Unità alla Grande guerra: repertorio analitico". Storia Amministrazione Costituzione (13): 227–228.
