= Miserendino =

Miserendino is a surname. Notable people with the surname include:

- Giulia Miserendino (born 2002), Italian weightlifter
- Vincenzo Miserendino (1875–1943), Italian sculptor
