= Candida, Campania =

Candida
- Comune
- Comune di Candida
- Location within Italy Location within Campania
- Coordinates: 40°57′N 14°53′E
- Country: Italy
- Region: Campania
- Province: Avellino (AV)

Government
  - Mayor: Fausto Picone (IV)

Area
  - Total: 5.43 km^{2} (2.10 sq mi)
- Elevation: 579 m (1,900 ft)

Population (December 31, 2004)
  - Total: 1,129
  - Density: 208/km^{2} (539/sq mi)
- Demonym: Candidesi
- Time zone: UTC+1 (CET)
  - Summer (DST): UTC+2 (CEST)
- Postal code: 83040
- Dialing code: 0825
- Patron saint: St. Philip Neri
- Saint day: May 26
- Website: Official website

Candida is a small town and comune (municipality) in the province of Avellino within the Campania region of Italy. It sits on top of a hill, at an elevation of 579 metres (1,900 ft) and has around 1,100 inhabitants. It is 10 kilometres (6 mi) from Avellino.

The economy is based mainly on agriculture.

== History ==
The first human settlements in the territory date back to the Roman times. Many ruins have been found in the localities of Cesine, Vigna, Selvetelle, Scandravoli, Giardino, Ponticelli, Gaudi, Toppa S. Andrea. The name of the town derives from the Latin "locus candidus" which means clear, shining place.

The first historical mention of the town appeared in 1045 when Candida was included, under the Lombard domination, in the Avellino county. From that time many feudal lords followed one another. The Filangieri family owned the fiefdom from 1187 with Alduino de Candida, until 1420 when Caterina Filangieri de Candida gave the fiefdom of Candida as a dowry to Sergianni Caracciolo. Then the fiefdom passed to the De Cardona, Magnacervo, Grimaldi, Saulli families back to the Caracciolos that kept it until the abolition of the feudal system.

== Notable sites ==
- Church of SS. Trinità (monastery of Sant'Agostino), originally in Gothic style. It was rebuilt in Renaissance style after 1550.
- Monastery and church of Montevergine, built in the 15th century.
- Collegiata Church (1540).
- Remains of the Lombard castle
