= Aldoino Filangieri di Candida =

Neapolitan nobleman

Aldoino (or Alduino) Filangieri di Candida (died December 1283) was a nobleman in the Kingdom of Naples. He was the son of Giordano of the Filangieri and an unnamed woman, the sister of Aldoino di Cicala, after whom he was named and from whom he inherited his fief. He inherited his uncle's fief of Candida on his father's death (in or before 1269). He was the father of the Filangieri di Candida.

By his wife, Giordana, daughter of Giacomo di Tricarico of the Sanseverino clan, Aldoino received as a dowry the fiefs of Solofra and Abriola. Their marriage took place before 1266, when Charles I granted one third of the castle of Sant'Agata Irpina at Solofra, withheld by Giacomo per the nuptial agreement, to Giordana and Aldoino in return for their support. They reinforced the castle during the War of the Sicilian Vespers.

Aldoino became a baron of the kingdom during the reign of Charles I. In 1283 he was the justiciar of the Terra di Bari when in November he was recalled, to be replaced by his brother Lotterio. He was to be made magister rationalis ("master of rations", i.e. commissar), but died en route to Naples. He was succeeded by his daughter Angela. His second daughter, Olimpia, married Simone II del Tufo in 1299.
