= Alessandro Filangieri, 6th Prince of Cutò =

Italian general and politician (1740-1806)

Alessandro Filangieri 6th Prince of Cutò
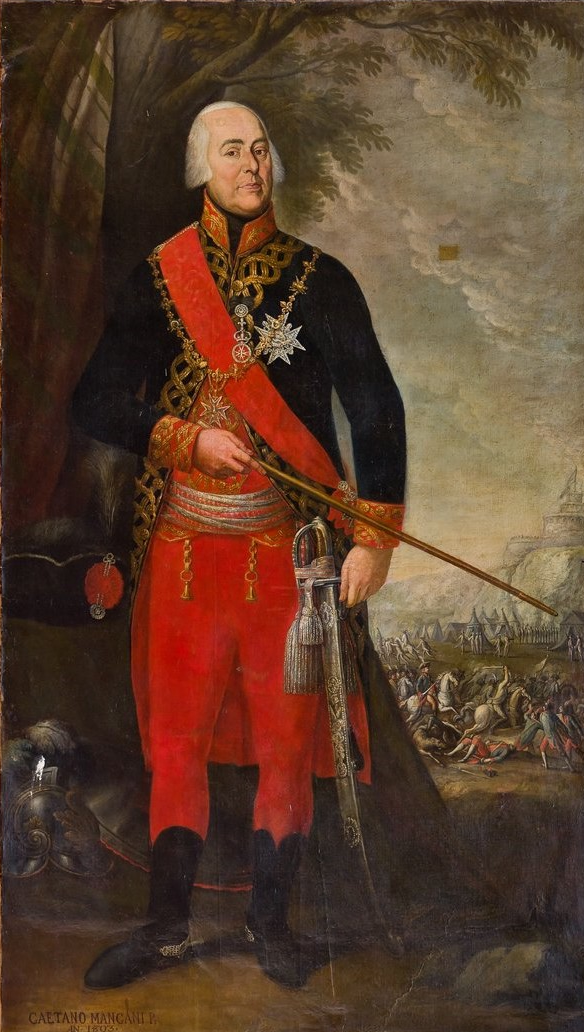

Viceroy of Sicily
- In office 16 February 1803 – January 1806
- Preceded by: Domenico Pignatelli di Belmonte
- Succeeded by: Francis, Duke of Calabria

Personal details
- Born: 6 September 1740 Palermo, Kingdom of Sicily
- Died: 6 February 1806 (aged 65) Palermo, Kingdom of Sicily
- Spouse: Nicoletta Filangieri
- Parent(s): Girolamo Filangieri; Bianca La Farina San Martino

Military service
- Allegiance: Kingdom of Sicily
- Years of service: 1778–1806
- Rank: Captain general
- Battles/wars: Italian campaign

Alessandro Filangieri, 6th Prince of Cutò (6 September 1740 – 6 February 1806), was an Italian general and politician.

== Early life ==
Filangieri was born in Palermo on 6 September 1740. He was the son of Bianca La Farina San Martino di Ramondetta (1714–1746) and Girolamo Filangieri, 5th Prince of Cutò (1714–1777), who was Brigadier General and Field Marshal of the Bourbon Army. After his mother died in 1746, his father married Aurora Morso Bonanno.

His paternal grandparents were Chief Justice of Palermo, Alessandro Filangieri, 4th Prince of Cutò and Francesca di Giovanni e Morra (a daughter of Domenico di Giovanni, Prince of Trecastagne and Isabella Morra, Princess of Buccheri e di Castrorao). His maternal grandparents were Luigi La Farina, 3rd Marquis of Madonia, and Isabella San Martino Ramondetto (a granddaughter of Giovanni San Martino Ramondetta, 1st Duke of San Martino). His maternal aunt was Caterina La Farina di Madonia, Princess of Castrofilippo, who married Domenico Giovanni Lorenzo Morreale.

== Career ==
Like his father, he undertook a military career, becoming a Lieutenant General, then a Brigadier General in 1785, and Marshal of the Cavalry Corps (maresciallo del corpo di cavalleria) in 1794. In 1796, fighting against the Napoleonic troops, he was wounded and taken prisoner on the Mincio. When he returned to his homeland, in 1799 he was appointed governor of the Messina square.

Appointed by Ferdinand III as Lieutenant of the Kingdom (a term used for the first time) and Captain General of the Kingdom of Sicily, he swore his oath on 16 February 1803. He remained so until a few days before his death, when in January 1806 he received Ferdinand III who had returned to Palermo after fleeing from Naples.

== Personal life ==
He was married to Nicoletta Filangieri, 2nd Baroness of San Carlo (1740–1812), a daughter of Nicoló Filangieri, 1st Baron of San Carlo (son of Marco Antonio Filangieri) and Angela De Cordova (a daughter of Filippo De Cordova). After her father's death in 1739 shortly before her birth, her mother married Domenico Beninati. He owned the Palazzo Filangeri-Cutò in Santa Margherita di Belice. Together, they were the parents of:

- Donna Maria Bianca Filangieri (1756–1802), who married Count Emanuele Lucchesi-Palli, eldest son and heir apparent of Antonio Lucchesi-Palli, 6th Prince of Campofranco and Donna Anna Maria Tomasi di Lampedusa.
- Don Girolamo Filangieri (1758–1781), who married Rosalia di Napoli e Bonfiglio, a daughter of Federico di Napoli e Montaperto, 7th Prince of Resuttano.
- Niccolò Filangieri (1760–1839), who was Lieutenant General of Sicily in 1816 and from 1821 to 1824; he married Princess Margherita Pignatelli, a daughter of Ettore Pignatelli, 9th Prince of Noia and Princess Anna Maria Piccolomini d'Aragona.
- Donna Angela Filangieri (b. 1767), who married Giuseppe Tomasi, 7th Prince of Lampedusa, son of Giulio Tomasi, 6th Prince of Lampedusa, and Maria Caterina Colonna Romano; Angela died in childbirth together with her newborn child.

Filangieri died in Palermo on 6 February 1806.
