= European Year of Cultural Heritage =

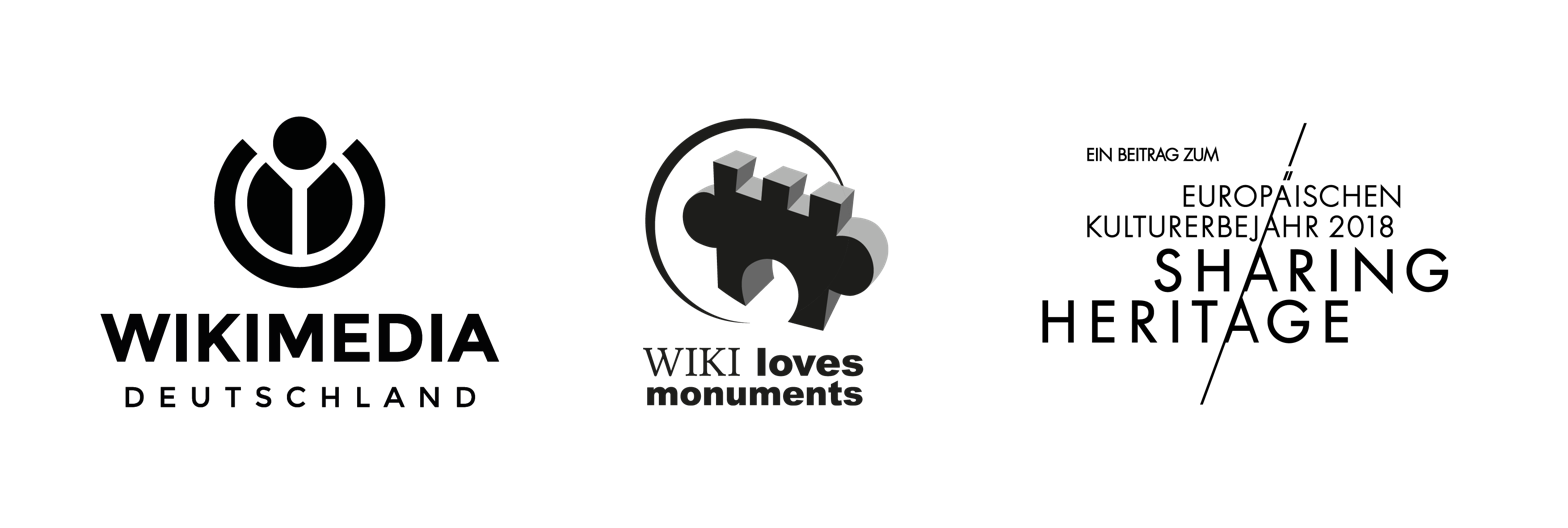
Logos of the European Year of Cultural Heritage (2018), Wiki Loves Monument and Wikimedia

The year of 2018 was designated to be the European Year of Cultural Heritage by the European Commission.

Announced in 2017, it was officially launched on January 31, 2018.

To this initiative are participating 28 European countries.
