= Luogotenente =

Royal office

The Italian word luogotenente (Italian: [ˌlwɔɡoteˈnɛnte]; plural luogotenenti) is an etymological parallel to lieutenant, deriving from the Latin locum tenens "holding a place", i.e. someone who fills a position instead of another, as a substitute or deputy.

A luogotenente generally is a high-ranking individual in a monarchy who either is designated to assume royal powers up to and including the regency of the kingdom in the event of the absence of the monarch, or is designated to exercise monarchical powers in a particular territory of the kingdom under the overall authority of the monarch. Typically, the office held by a luogotenente is the lieutenenancy of the king or lieutenancy of the kingdom and the title of a person exercising the authority of a lieutenancy has included king's lieutenant, lieutenant general (not to be confused with the military rank of lieutenant general), and lieutenant general of the kingdom, but many variations in the title of the office and of the officeholder have existed.

Luogotenente also has had other uses, serving as a military or administrative title in some contexts.

== Republic of Venice ==
In the Republic of Venice, "luogotenente" was the title of a senior provincial governor, used alongside the titles of duke (duca) or provveditore generale ("governor-general"). A luogotenente held office in:

- Udine, as governor of the Patria del Friuli from 1418 to 1797, except for cases where a provveditore generale with more sweeping powers was appointed.
- Nicosia, serving as the Venetian viceroy of Cyprus from 1489 until the Ottoman conquest of Cyprus in 1570.

== Kingdom of Sicily ==
=== Under the Swabians ===
As early as the 13th century, lieutenancy existed in the Kingdom of Sicily, then ruled by the Swabians, when Manfred ruled Sicily as regent on behalf of his brother Conard II (often called Conradin) with the title of "luogotenente."

=== Under the Aragonese ===
After the Angevin period, the Aragonese took on the commitment to keep the Kingdom of Sicily distinct from the Kingdom of Aragon, and the King of Aragon appointed a luogotenente who reigned in Sicily in his absence. As a result of this policy, when Peter III was recalled to Spain he left the lieutenancy in Sicily to Alfonso III of Aragon. After that, James II of Aragon was invested with the role of luogotenente.

Over the centuries, princes not of royal blood who performed functions in Sicily on behalf of the King of Aragon were given the title of "king's lieutenant."

=== Under the Bourbons ===
The Bourbon King of Naples Ferdinand IV, who also was King of Sicily as Ferdinand III abolished the office of Viceroy of Sicily in 1803 and established the position of "Lieutenant General of Sicily." Alessandro Filangieri, Prince of Cutò, served as luogotenente generale ("lieutenant general') from 1803 to 1806. When Napoleon invaded the Kingdom of Naples in 1806, Ferdinand fled to Palermo in Sicily and resumed direct rule of the Kingdom of Sicily.

In 1812, Ferdinand refused to grant a constitution to the Sicilian parliament and, in 1813, he practically abdicated his throne, fleeing to Ficuzza and appointing his son Francesco (Francis, Duke of Calabria) to serve as luogotenente generale. In this role, Francis served as regent in Sicily.

After the fall of Napoleon, Ferdinand was able to return to Naples as ruler of the Kingdom of Naples in May 1815. Ferdinand kept Francis in Sicily as luogotenente. Francis retained his lieutenancy in Sicily until 1820, even after the establishment in 1816 of the Kingdom of the Two Sicilies, which Ferdinand ruled as Ferdinand I.

== Kingdom of the Two Sicilies ==
In the Kingdom of the Two Sicilies, a Luogotenente generale dei reali domini al di là del Faro (Lieutenant-general of the royal domains beyond the Lighthouse) served as the governor of Sicily in accordance with the Statute of 11 December 1816. Holders of the Sicilian lieutenancy after the establishment of the Kingdom of the Two Sicilies were:

- 1816 Niccolò Filangieri, Prince of Cutò
- 1817 Francis, Duke of Calabria
- 1820 Diego Naselli d'Aragona
- 1820 – 1821 Pietro Colletta, then Vito Nunziante
- 1821 Niccolò Filangieri, Prince of Cutò
- 1824 – 1830 Pietro Ugo, Marquess of Favare
- 1830 – 1835 Prince Leopold, Count of Syracuse
- 1835 – 1837 Antonio Lucchesi-Palli, 7th Prince of Campofranco
- 1840 – 1848 Lt.-Gen. Luigi Nicola De Majo, Duke of San Pietro
- 1848 – 1855 General Carlo Filangieri, Prince of Satriano, Duke of Taormina
- 1855 – 1860 Paolo Ruffo, Prince of Castelcicala
- 1860 General Ferdinando Lanza

== Kingdom of France ==
In the Kingdom of France, the Count of Artois, brother of the King of France, preceded the return of King Louis XVIII to Paris after the fall of Napoleon in 1814 and took the title of "lieutenant general of the kingdom." From 2 to 9 August 1830, Duke Louis Philippe of Orleans assumed the title of lieutenant general of the kingdom.

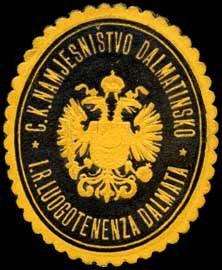
I.R. Luogotenenza Dalmata – sealing stamp of the Dalmatian stadtholder's office

== Austrian Empire and Austria-Hungary ==
In the Austrian Empire and its successor state Austria-Hungary, Imperiale Regio Luogotenente ("Imperial Royal Lieutenant") was the official title for imperial and royal stadtholders in Austro-Hungarian crown lands using Italian as an official language, such as Dalmatia, Lombardo-Venetia (which had two luogotenenti, one each for Lombardy and Veneto), Gorizia and Gradisca, Istria, and the Imperial Free City of Trieste, with the latter three lands combined under the one luogotenente of the Littoral. The title was in use between 1849 and 1918. Its equivalents in other official languages of Austria-Hungary were namjesnik (in Croatian), místodržitel (in Czech), Statthalter (in German), helytartó (in Hungarian), namiestnik (in Polish), and namesnik (in Slovenian).

== Kingdom of Sardinia ==
In the Kingdom of Sardinia, which the House of Savoy ruled prior to the unification of Italy, it was customary to appoint a lieutenant general of the kingdom (Italian: luogotenente generale del regno), chosen from among members of the Savoy royal family to carry out some of the king's duties as viceroy while the king was away from his office to follow the army on the battlefield during war. In 1848, when during the First Italian War of Independence (1848–1849) King of Sardinia Charles Albert (Italian: Carlo Alberto) reached the battlefield in Lombardy, Eugene Emmanuel of Savoy-Carignano (Italian: Eugenio Emanuele di Savoia-Carignano) was appointed "lieutenant general of the kingdom", a position he also held in 1849, when, after Charles Albert's defeat in the Battle of Novara, it fell to him to make the announcement that the defeated king had abdicated and the crown of Sardinia had passed to his son Victor Emmanuel II (Italian: Vittorio Emanuele II).

== Kingdom of Italy ==
=== King's lieutenant ===
In the Kingdom of Italy, unified under the House of Savoy, the institution of the lieutenancy general of the king (Italian: luogotenenza generale del re) was not codified in law, but became over time a true constitutional custom, finding application in the unification of Italy (Italian: Risorgimento) between 1859 and 1870 and during World War I, in which Italy participated from May 1915 to November 1918.

==== Lieutenancies in the unification of Italy ====
As he had in 1848–1849 in the Kingdom of Sardinia, Eugene Emmanuel of Savoy-Carignano held the title of "lieutenant general of the kingdom" in 1859 when King Victor Emmanuel II took part in the Second Italian War of Independence.

Immediately after the new Kingdom of Italy issued decrees annexing pre-unification Italian states, it delegated the function of governing the territories of the former states in the name of the king to a decentralized constitutional body that served as the provisional government in each state. A "lieutenant of the king" served as the leader of each provisional government and oversaw the administration of the territory of each former state while awaiting its administrative unification with the kingdom. The title of "lieutenant of the king" fell to various figures in the annexed territories, such as that of the dictator or the royal commissioner that preceded the annexation.

A lieutenancy was established on the territory of the former Grand Duchy of Tuscany, where Eugene Emmanuel of Savoy-Carignano was appointed "king's lieutenant" when the Kingdom of Italy annexed the grand duchy in 22 March 1860. He held the position until February 1861.

In the former territories of the Kingdom of the Two Sicilies in Sicily, King Victor Emmanuel II appointed Senator Massimo Cordero di Montezemolo as "Lieutenant General of the King in the Sicilian Provinces" in December 1860 at the end of Giuseppe Garibaldi's dictatorship in Sicily. Montezemolo led a Council of Lieutenancy in Sicily which held the powers of the central government of the Kingdom of Italy except for those of Foreign Affairs, War, and the Navy. Montezemolo was followed by Alessandro Della Rovere and then Ignazio De Genova di Pettinengo before the lieutenancy ceased in January 1862.

In the Neapolitan provinces of the Kingdom of the Two Sicilies, which included most of Southern Italy (Italian: Mezzogiorno), Victor Emmanuel II appointed Luigi Carlo Farini as lieutenant general of the king on 6 November 1860. Eugene Emmanuel of Savoy-Carignano succeeded him on 3 January 1861 and remained in Naples until the end of May 1861. Thereafter, General Enrico Cialdini served as lieutenant general in Naples from 15 July to 15 October 1861.

Eugene Emmanuel of Savoy-Carignano held the title of "lieutenant general of the kingdom" in 1866 when Victor Emmanuel II took part in the Third Italian War of Independence.

After the Kingdom of Italy captured Rome from the Papal States in September 1870, it established the "General Lieutenancy of the King for Rome and the Roman Provinces" with Royal Decree Number 5906 of 9 October 1870. It was headed by Alfonso La Marmora. It was abolished on 1 February 1871.

==== World War I ====
When Italy entered World War I on the side of the Allies in May 1915, King Victor Emmanuel III (Italian: Vittorio Emanuele III) decided to leave for the front and entrusted some of his governmental functions to his uncle, Prince Tommaso, Duke of Genoa, by a special decree of 25 May 1915.

As lieutenant general, Prince Tommasso carried out only formal and protocol functions in Rome without any role in substantive governance. However, during the war years royal decrees were called "lieutenant decrees" and bore the signature of Prince Tommasso rather than that of Victor Emmanuel III. The war ended on 11 November 1918, but Prince Tommasso's lieutenancy extended well beyond that: It was not until 7 July 1919 that Prince Tommasso returned to private life and the King to the full extent of his functions in accordance with Decree Number 1082 of 6 July 1919.

==== Italian protectorate of Albania ====
Italy conquered the Albanian Kingdom in April 1939, establishing the Italian protectorate of Albania with Victor Emmanuel III as its king. In 1940, the Kingdom of Italy considered appointing Prince Adalberto, Duke of Bergamo, to act as king's lieutenant general in Albania, but no such appointment took place.

=== Lieutenant General of the Kingdom ===
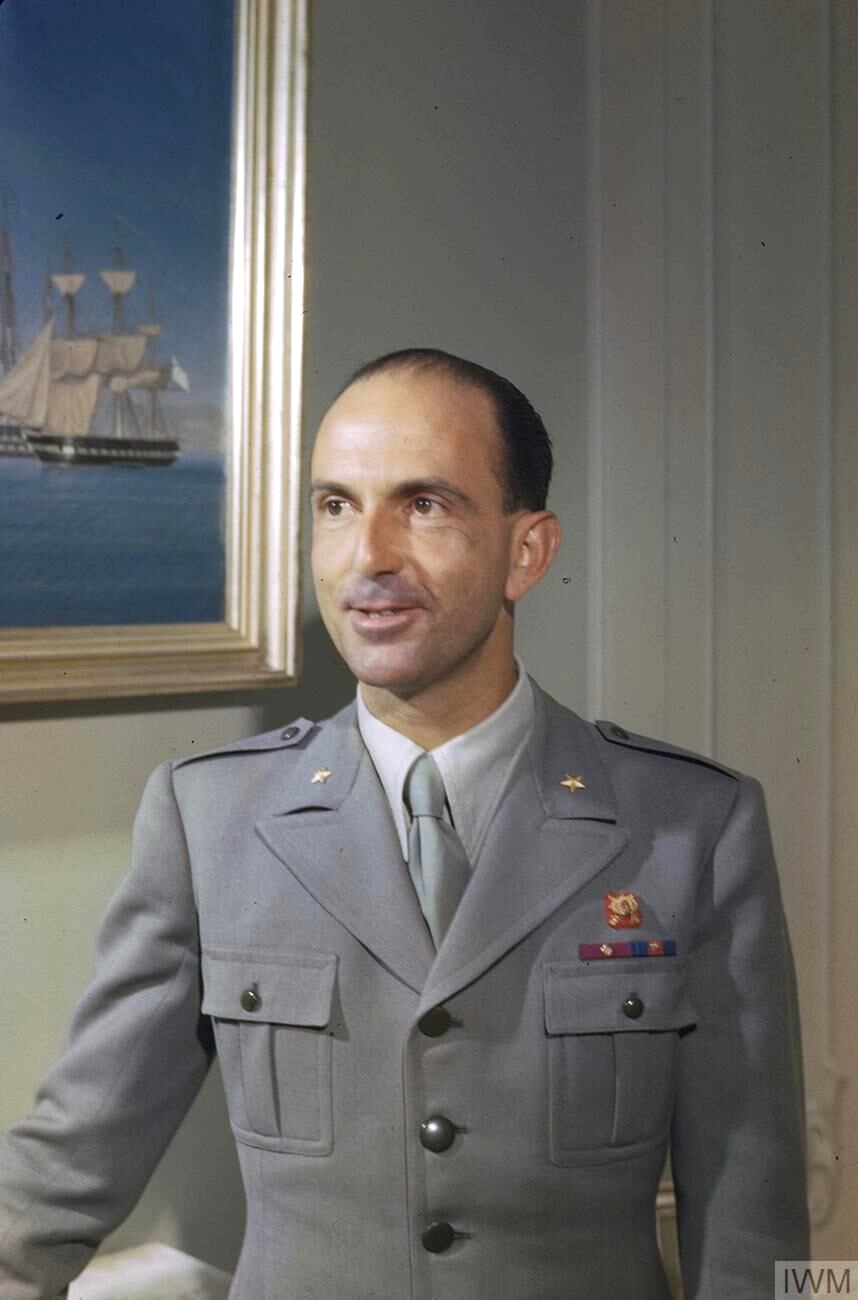
Prince Umberto in May 1944, a month before his appointment as "Lieutenant General of the Kingdom."

During World War II, Italy surrendered to the Allies on 8 September 1943 and switched to the Allied side. The Kingdom of Italy's support for Italian fascism before the surrender and its choices thereafter had made the House of Savoy unpopular in Italy by the spring of 1944, leading to growing sentiment for King Victor Emmanuel III's abdication and even for the replacement of the monarchy with a republic; in fact, the leaders of anti-fascist Italian political parties desired the abdication of Victor Emmanuel, the renunciation of the throne by his son Crown prince Umberto, former Prince of Piedmont, and the immediate appointment of a civil regent. In the spring of 1944, Victor Emmanuel reached a compromise agreement – supported by former president of the Chamber of Deputies and future president of the Italian Republic Enrico De Nicola — with the National Liberation Committee (Italian: Comitato di Liberazione Nazionale), to "freeze" the institutional question about the future government of Italy until the end of World War II and the concurrent Italian Civil War between the Kingdom of Italy and the Italian Social Republic. Under this agreement, Victor Emmanuel III retired to private life on 5 June 1944, remaining king but appointing his son Umberto to serve as regent, exercising the prerogatives of the sovereign without holding the title of king.

Although Victor Emmanuel's signed appointment decree contained the traditional wording "Appointment of HRH [His Royal Highness] Umberto of Savoy, Prince of Piedmont, as Lieutenant General of the King," Umberto assumed the title of "Lieutenant General of the Kingdom" (Italian: Luogotenente generale del Regno) instead of "King's Lieutenant," as always used in the past. This choice was made to underline both Umberto's greater powers as lieutenant – unlike previous lieutenants, he was not subordinate to the king – and that the maintenance of the monarchy or the transition to a republican regime would be implemented freely, without the need to consult with or remove the king. The title of "Lieutenant General of the Kingdom," rather than of the king, also rooted Umberto's role more with the Italian state than with the monarchy.

After his appointment, Umberto split his role between lieutenant and crown prince: As lieutenant general he ruled Italy like a provisional head of state, while as crown prince he served as pretender to a throne now removed from automatic dynastic succession, pending resolution of the question of the institutional form of the future Italian state. In 1944 he signed Lieutenant Decree-Law Number 151/1944, which established that "after the liberation of the national territory" of Italy from the Axis powers and the Italian Social Republic "the institutional forms" of government would be "chosen by the Italian people, who for this purpose" would elect "by universal, direct, and secret suffrage, a Constituent Assembly to decide on the new Constitution of the State," extending the vote to women for the first time. As lieutenant, Umberto soon earned the trust of the Allies thanks to his choice of orienting the policies of the Italian monarchy toward pro-Western positions.

Umberto's lieutenancy lasted until 9 May 1946, when the buildup to Italy's first post-World War II elections led Victor Emmanuel III's advisors to induce him to abdicate in advance of the referendum on the future governance of the Italian state scheduled for 2 and 3 June 1946. The advisors hoped that his abdication would further distance the House of Savoy from Victor Emmanuel, who had favored the advent of the fascist Mussolini government, and increase the chance that the referendum would result in the preservation of the monarchy. When Victor Emmanuel abdicated, Umberto took the throne as King Umberto II, but the results of the June 1946 referendum favored the abolition of the monarchy and establishment of the Italian Republic, and Umberto II reigned only until 18 June 1946 before going into exile.

== Sovereign Military Order of Malta ==
In the Sovereign Military Order of Malta, the Luogotenente ("Lieutenant") of the Grand Master is a knightly officer who is in daily command of the Grand Master's own regimental company, to which the famigliari (closest personal staff) belong. During periods when the order has no Grand Master – such as during much of the 19th century, and at other times when no Grand Master can be elected – the Lieutenant of the Grand Master can govern the order, although without the prerogatives of honor pertaining to a sovereign.

In the event of the incapacitation, resignation, or death of the Grand Master, the Grand Commander of the order can serve as "Lieutenant ad interim, carrying out ordinary administrative duties pending the election of a new Grand Master or of the Lieutenant of the Grand Master if no Grand Master can be elected.

== Sources ==
- Da Mosto, Andrea (1940). L'Archivio di Stato di Venezia. Indice Generale, Storico, Descrittivo ed Analitico. Tomo II: Archivi dell'Amministrazione Provinciale della Repubblica Veneta, archivi delle rappresentanze diplomatiche e consolari, archivi dei governi succeduti alla Repubblica Veneta, archivi degli istituti religiosi e archivi minori (PDF) (in Italian). Rome: Biblioteca d'arte editrice. OCLC 889222113.
- Vignoli, Giulio (2006). Il sovrano sconosciuto: Tomislavo II re di Croazia (in Italian). Milan, Italy: Mursia. ISBN 88-425-3583-4.
- WorldStatesmen - Cyprus
