= Filangieri =

Italian noble family

Filangieri Italian: Casa di Filangieri
- Italian noble family
- Coat of arms of the Filangieri of Naples
- Parent family: Duke of Normandy
- Country: Italy
- Founded: 11th century
- Founder: Riccardo "Angerio" Filangieri
- Titles: Prince of Arianello; Prince of Satriano; Prince of Cutò; Prince of Mirto; Prince of Santa Flavia; Duke of Pino; Marquis of Lucca Sicula; Count of Avellino; Lord of Lapio; Lord of Vietri
- Cadet branches: Candida; Candida Gonzaga

The Filangieri (or Filangeri or Filingeri) were an Italo-Norman noble family whose members were first established as counts and lords in the province of Avellino (c. 1100). Having established itself in much of Southern Italy in the second half of the 11th century, the family played a key role in the history of the Kingdom of Sicily and the Kingdom of Naples after the fall of the Altavilla family, which occurred at the end of the 12th century at the hands of the Hohenstaufen.

== History ==
The name Filangieri originates from the Latin Filli Angerii (sons of Angerio) named after Richard "Angerio" of Arnes, who adopted the nickname "Angerio" during his military service as captain of the Italian falangerio (phalanges) in the First Crusade. They played a prominent role in the Kingdom of Sicily (prior to the War of the Sicilian Vespers) and the subsequent Kingdom of Naples.

Over the years, the family came to hold the highest political and military positions in the Kingdom of Sicily first and then in the Kingdom of Naples, finally coming to own a total of six principalities, eight duchies, two marquisates, sixteen counties and over 120 baronies. It was also awarded the Grandee of Spain, the Order of the Golden Fleece and other illustrious Orders of Chivalry and, in 1444, it was received into the Order of Malta. Among others, it enjoyed nobility in Benevento, Messina, Naples in the Seats of Capuana and Nido, Palermo and Trani in the Seat of Campo.

The family eventually branched out into the following lines: Princes of Arianello, Princes of Satriano, Counts of Avellino, Lords of Lapio and Lords of Vietri in the Kingdom of Naples, Princes of Cutò, Princes of Mirto, Princes of Santa Flavia and Dukes of Pino in the Kingdom of Sicily, and Candida Gonzaga.

=== Princes of Cutò ===
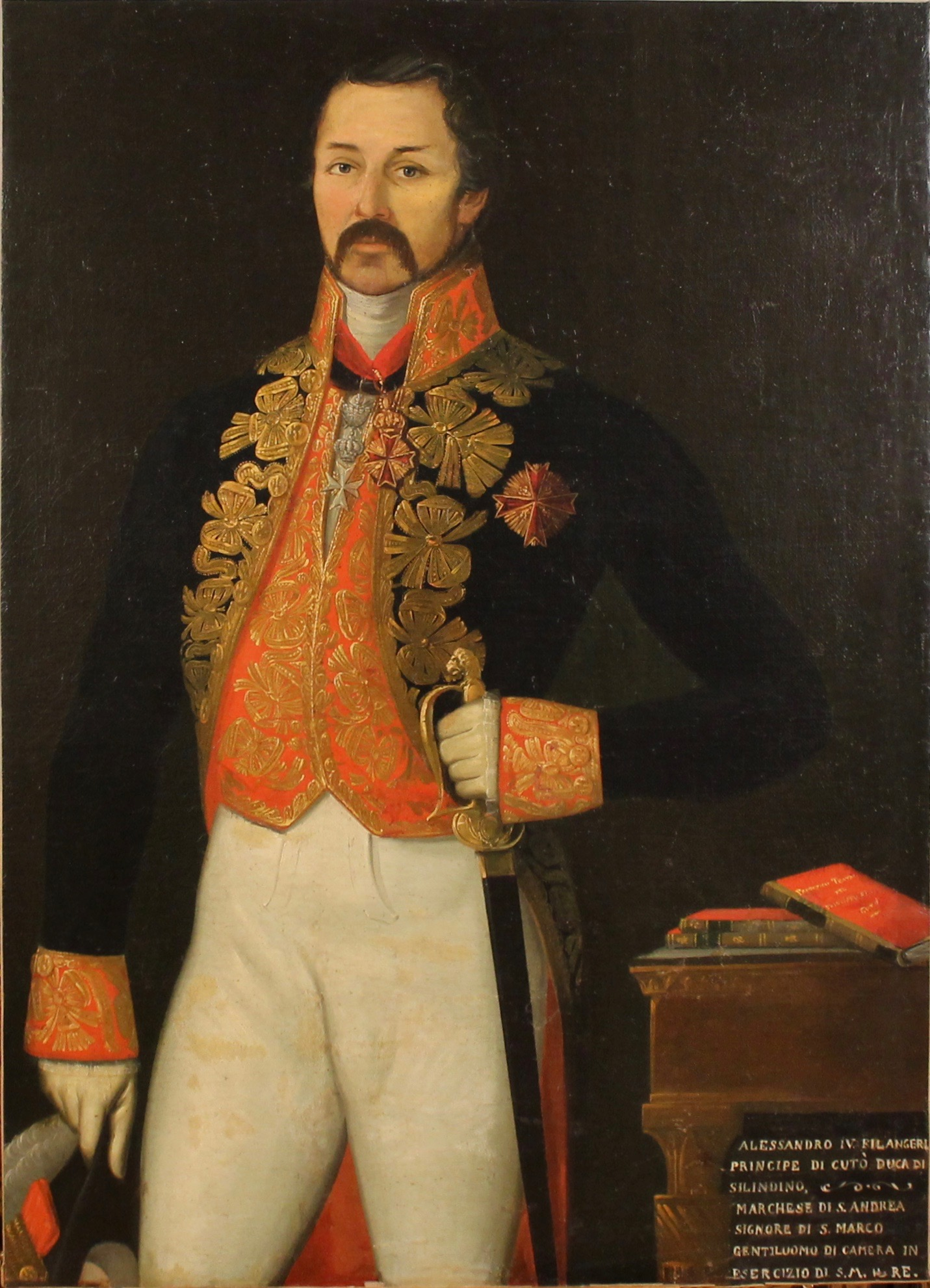
Alessandro Filangieri of the Princes of Cutò branch

The first to be invested with the Principality of Cutò was Alessandro Filangieri, Marquis of Lucca Sicula, who married Giulia Platamone, heiress of the fiefdom, in 1706. Among the Princes of Cutò there was another Alessandro, Captain and Justiciar of Palermo in 1726 and, Girolamo, also Captain and Justiciar in 1743 and gentleman of the chamber of King Charles III of Spain. The branch boasted various Viceroys and Lieutenants, including Alessandro Filangieri and his son Niccolò Filangieri. Their main residences were the Palazzo Cutò located in Bagheria in Via Maqueda, designed by Giacomo Amato, with a staircase built by the architect Giovanni Del Frago, and the Palazzo Cutò in Corso Vittorio Emanuele, opposite the Palermo Cathedral, whose façade is by the architect Emmanuele Palazzotto in 1836. Teresa Mastrogiovanni Tasca Filangieri di Cutò, mother of the poet Lucio Piccolo, Baron of Calanovella, son of Giuseppe, and his sister Beatrice, mother of the writer Giuseppe Tomasi, 11th Prince of Lampedusa, 12th Duke of Palma, belonged to this branch.

== Notable members ==
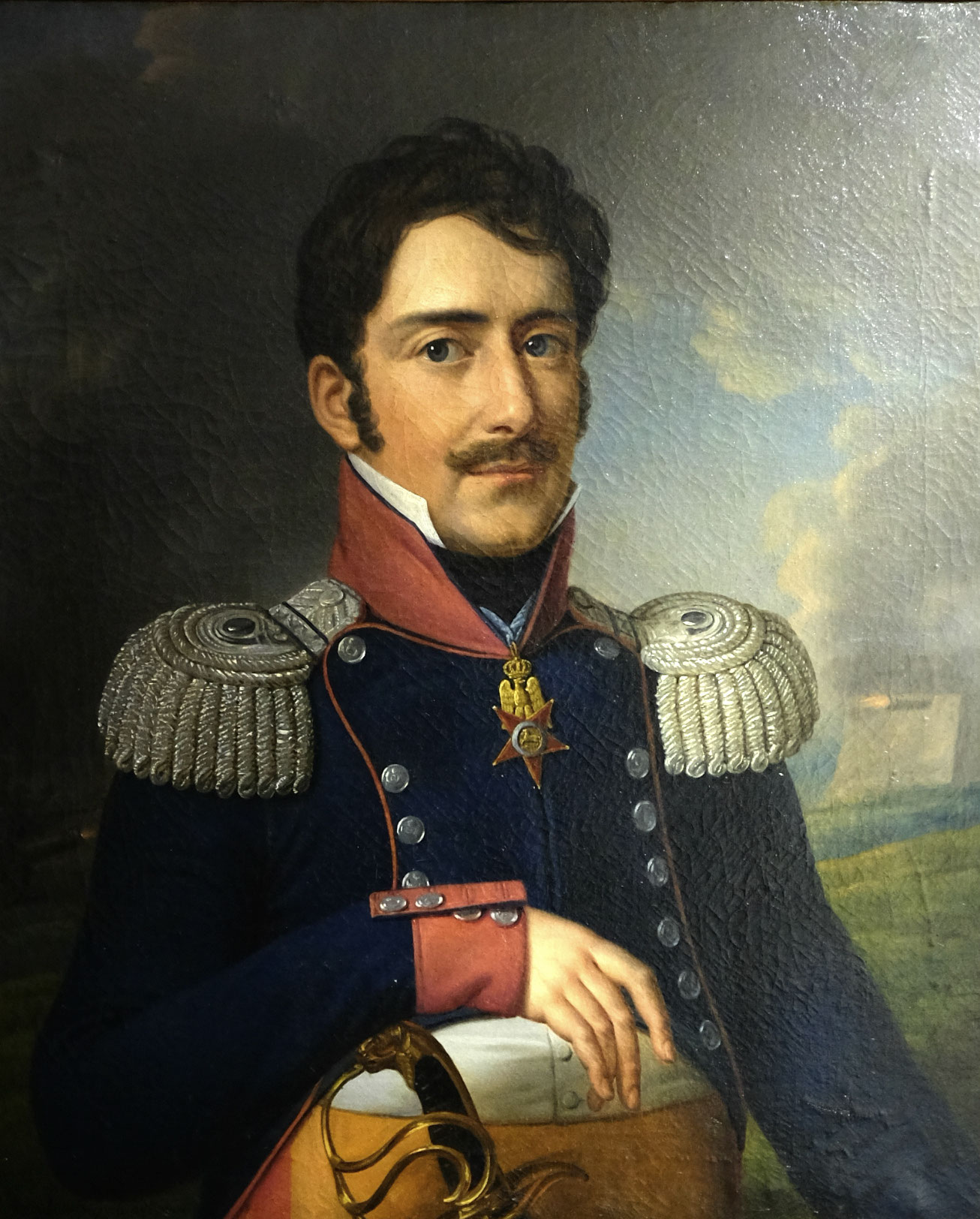
Carlo Filangieri, 6th Prince of Satriano

- Giordano Filangieri I
- Riccardo Filangieri I (c. 1195–1254/63), son of Giordano I
- Giordano Filangieri II (b. 1195/1200), son of Giordano I
- Lotterio Filangieri I
- Enrico Filangieri (d. 1258)
- Marino Filangieri (d. 1251)
- Lotterio Filangieri II (d. 1302), son of Giordano II
- Aldoino Filangieri di Candida (d. 1283), son of Giordano II; founder of the Candida branch
- Riccardo Filangieri di Candida (d. 1321)
- Guido Filangieri
- Giordano Filangieri III
- Alessandro Filangieri (1740–1806), son of Girolamo; Prince of Cutò
- Gaetano Filangieri, 5th Prince of Satriano (1753–1788), son of Cesare, Prince of Arianiello
- Niccolò Filangieri (1760–1839), son of Alessandro; Lieutenant General of Sicily
- Carlo Filangieri, 6th Prince of Satriano (1784–1867), son of Gaetano
- Gaetano Filangieri, 7th Prince of Satriano (1824–1892), son of Carlo; founder of the Museo Civico Filangieri

== Affiliated properties ==
=== Campania ===
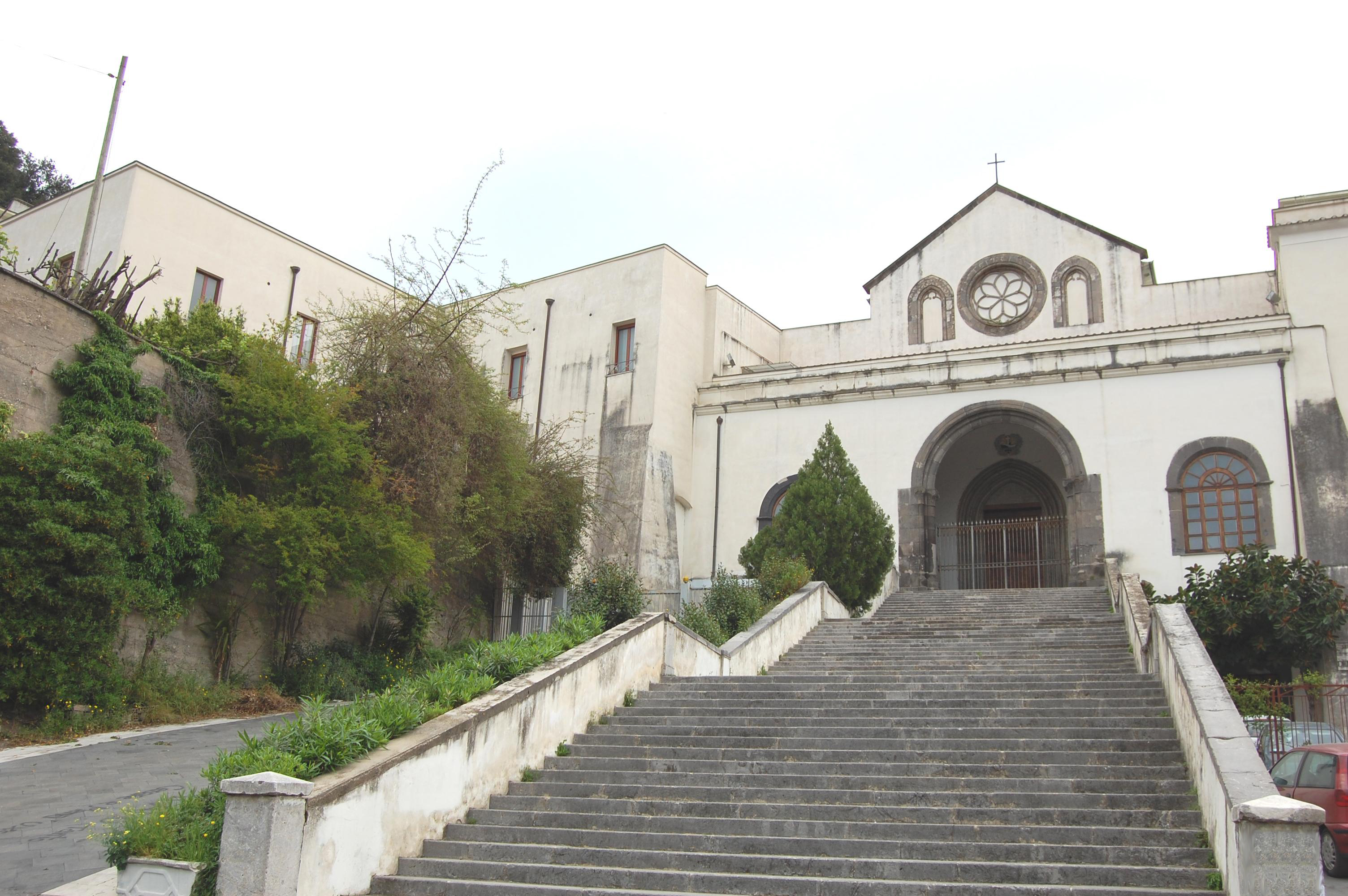
Basilica of St. Antony in Nocera Inferiore, architecture in Campania.

- Convent of Sant'Antonio in Nocera Inferiore.
- Candida Castle.
- Immaculate Church and Sant'Antonio alla Cercola, built in 1755 by Cesare Filangieri, Prince of Arianiello, until 1877 it fell within the hamlet of Ponte della Cercola in the municipality of San Sebastiano al Vesuvio and was a branch of the Sanctuary of San Sebastiano Martire.
- Palazzo Baronale of Lapio.
- Palazzo Filangieri a Chiaia of Naples.
- Palazzo Filangieri d'Arianello of Naples.
- Palazzo Filangieri di San Potito Sannitico.
- Palazzo Filangieri d'Arianiello di San Sebastiano al Vesuvio (birthplace of the jurist Gaetano Filangieri). Since 1877 the residence has been part of the territory of the municipality of Massa di Somma which changed its name to Cercola in the same year; the palace was demolished in the 1980s.
- Villa Filangieri De Clario of San Paolo Bel Sito.
- Villa Filangieri Rossi of Torre Annunziata.

=== Sicily ===
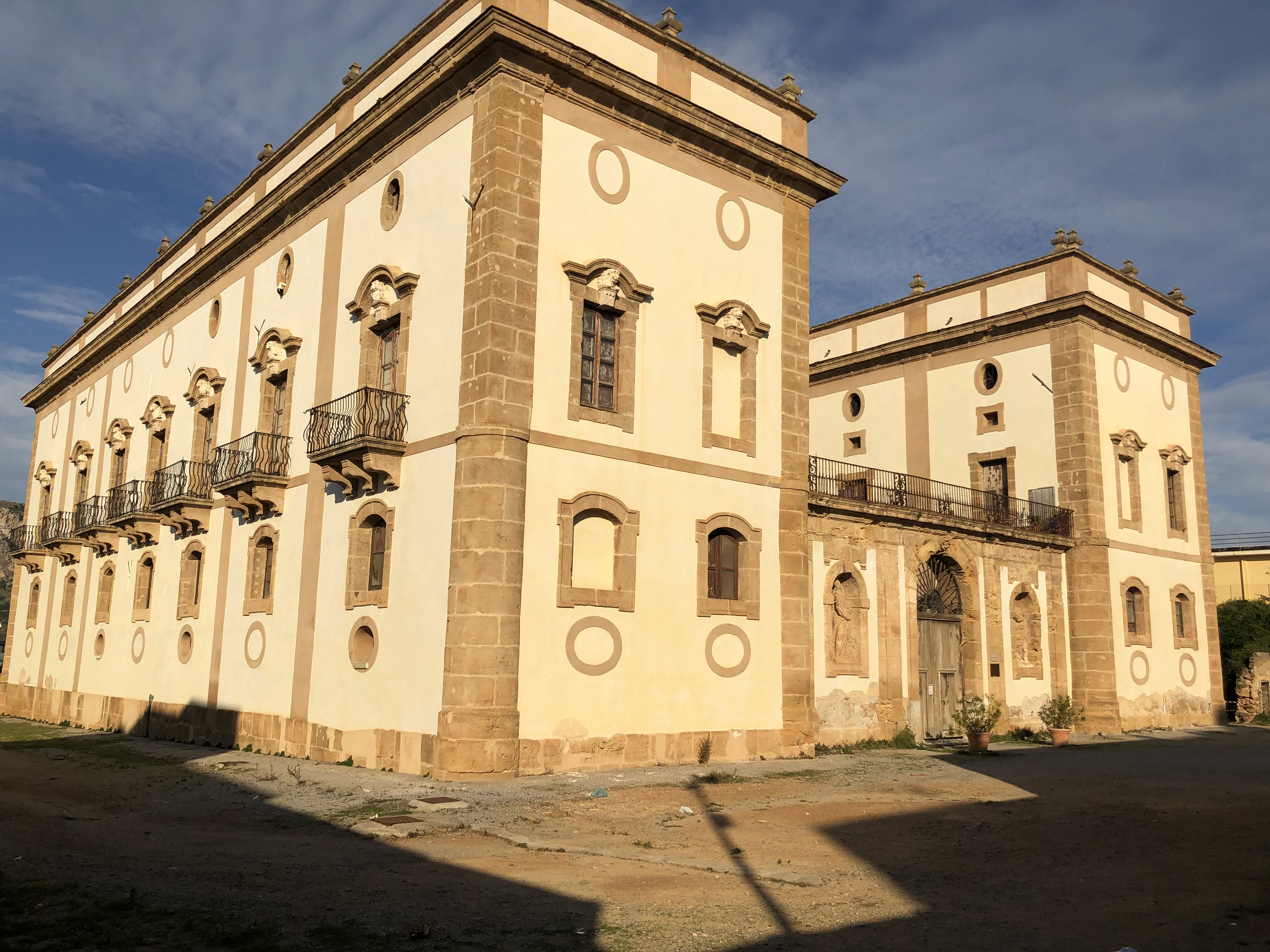
Palazzo Cutò in Bagheria

- Baglio of Villafrati, feudal residence of the Princes of Mirto, also Counts of San Marco.
- Castello di San Marco d'Alunzio, currently in ruins.
- Palazzo Cutò of Bagheria.
- Palazzo Filangeri-Cutò, Palermo
- Palazzo Filangeri-Cutò, Santa Margherita di Belice, damaged by the 1968 earthquake.
- Palazzo Mirto in Palermo, inhabited by the Princes of Mirto, also Counts of San Marco, until 1984.
- Palazzo Ramacca, seat of the National Academy of Sciences, Letters and Arts, founded in 1718 by Pietro Filangieri.
- Cutò Square, Lucca Sicula.
- Villa Filangeri, Santa Flavia, today seat of the municipality Santa Flavia's town hall.
- Villa San Marco, Santa Flavia.
