= February 1968 =

Month of 1968

<<	February 1968					>>
Su	Mo	Tu	We	Th	Fr	Sa
				1	2	3
4	5	6	7	8	9	10
11	12	13	14	15	16	17
18	19	20	21	22	23	24
25	26	27	28	29

February 1, 1968: RCAF, RCN and Army merge as Canadian Armed Forces

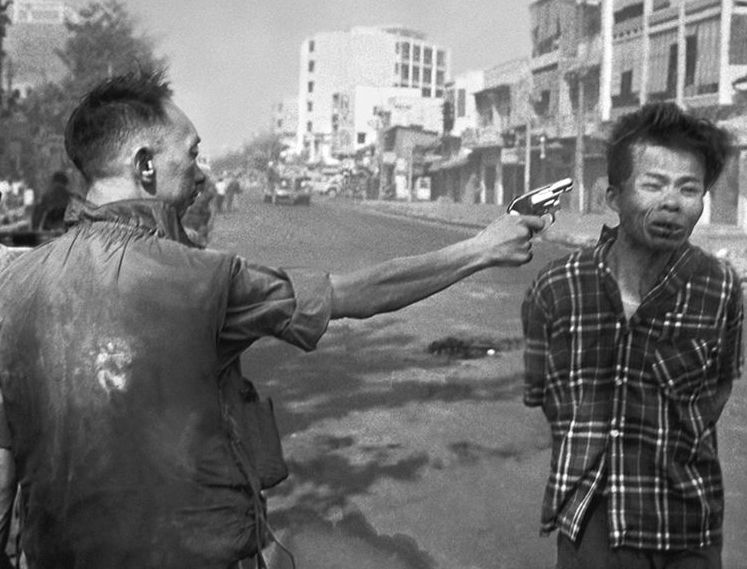
February 1, 1968: Saigon police chief Nguyễn Ngọc Loan executes Viet Cong suspect Nguyễn Văn Lém in front of film crew

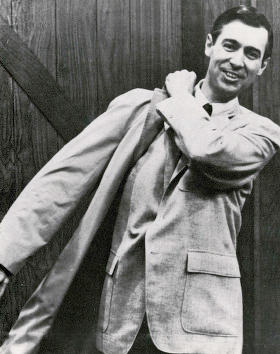
February 19, 1968: Fred Rogers debuts children's program on U.S. television

The following events occurred in February 1968:

== February 1, 1968 (Thursday) ==
- The Royal Canadian Air Force, the Royal Canadian Navy and the Canadian Army merged to form the unified Canadian Armed Forces. The 105,000 members all wore the same type of "dull-green uniform" to replace the distinct sailors, soldiers, and airmen standard issue; naval rank designations were retained, but the insignia for seagoing armed forces officers was similar to those used by those in the army or air force, with a common symbol for a navy captain and an army colonel, or an army captain and a navy lieutenant.
- The day after the Tet Offensive had seen a massive attack on South Vietnam's capital, Saigon's police chief, Brigadier General Nguyễn Ngọc Loan, displayed a captured Viet Cong officer, Nguyễn Văn Lém, to a group of reporters. As the journalists watched, the chief pulled out a .38 caliber revolver and executed the Viet Cong prisoner with a single shot to the head at point-blank range. Photographer Eddie Adams captured the moment in an iconic photo. In addition, a crew for the American NBC television network filmed the event and the footage was broadcast on the Huntley–Brinkley Report the following night.
- Two garbage men for the sanitation department of Memphis, Tennessee, Echol Cole and Robert Walker, were crushed to death when the compactor within the truck accidentally activated as the truck was driving along Colonial Road near Quince Road to the city dump. The accident was initially blamed on a shovel falling from the truck onto some wires and causing a short circuit. Eleven days later, sanitation workers went on a strike that would last for more than two months and would bring civil rights leader Martin Luther King Jr. to the city on April 4.
- In the United States, the Pennsylvania Railroad and the New York Central Railroad merged to form "Penn Central", the service name for the new corporation officially called the "Pennsylvania New York Central Transportation Company". The merger took effect at 12:10 a.m. Eastern time, and, at $4.29 billion, was the biggest in corporate history at the time. The last obstacle to the combination was cleared when the United States Supreme Court concluded on January 15 that it would not violate antitrust laws.
- At the Columbus Zoo outside of Columbus in Powell, Ohio, a gorilla was born to Colo — who had, on December 22, 1956, been the first gorilla born in captivity — marking the first time in recorded history that a second generation of gorillas had been born in a zoo. Colo's offspring, a female, would be named "Emmy".
- The USS Rowan collided with the Soviet merchant ship Kapitan Vislobokov in the Sea of Japan, roughly 95 miles (153 km) east of the South Korean port of Pohang, leaving a 6-foot (1.8 m) wide hole in the Russian vessel's stern, but causing no injuries.
- Former U.S. Vice President Richard M. Nixon announced his candidacy for the Republican Party nomination for President of the United States. Nixon had been the Republican candidate in 1960 but lost to John F. Kennedy.
- Vince Lombardi resigned as head coach of the Green Bay Packers following their win in Super Bowl II and retained his job as the team's general manager.
- Minimum wage in the United States was raised from $1.40 an hour to $1.60 an hour.
- Born:
  - Mark Recchi, Canadian ice hockey player and Hockey Hall of Fame member who spent 22 seasons in the National Hockey League; in Kamloops, British Columbia
  - Lisa Marie Presley, American singer and songwriter, and the sole heir of the fortune of her father, Elvis Presley; in Memphis, Tennessee (d. 2023)
  - Pauly Shore, American comedian and actor; in Hollywood, California
- Died: Lawson Little, 57, American golfer who won the U.S. Open in 1940, died of a heart attack.

== February 2, 1968 (Friday) ==
- British musicians Ian Anderson, Jeffrey Hammond and John Evan, who had played under various billings such as "Navy Blue", "Ian Anderson's Bag o'Nails" and "Bag o'Blues", appeared in concert for the first time under the name that they would become their trademark, Jethro Tull. Their talent agent, Dave Robson, had suggested that they borrow the name of an 18th Century agriculturalist and inventor, the Viscount Jethro Tull (1674–1741), who had invented the horse-drawn seed drill that revolutionized agriculture. Robson's reasoning was that the name "had a nice grubby farmer sound to it".
- Hilmar Baunsgaard became the new Prime Minister of Denmark after King Frederik IX approved the forming a coalition government of Baunsgaard's leftist Social Liberal Party with the Conservative People's Party and the center-right Venstre Party encompassing a majority (99 of 179 seats) in Denmark's parliament, the Folketing. Baunsgaard replaced Jens Otto Krag, whose Social Democrats had won 62 seats, more than any of the other parties but far from a majority.
- In Bangui, the capital of the Central African Republic (CAR), President Jean-Bédel Bokassa, President Joseph Mobutu of the Congo, and President François Tombalbaye of Chad agreed to form the Union of Central African States (UEAC, the Union des etats de l'Afrique centrale). Ten months after setting up the alliance, Bokassa would announce the CAR's withdrawal.
- Wilt Chamberlain of the Philadelphia 76ers performed the first, and only, "triple double double" in National Basketball Association history, with 22 points, 25 rebounds and 21 assists in a 131 to 121 win at home over the Detroit Pistons.
- The United States 1st Cavalry Division was able to take back the city of Quang Tri from the Viet Cong two days after the provincial capital had been taken during the Tet Offensive.
- Deputy U.S. Secretary of Defense Paul H. Nitze inaugurated a program to curtail the growing use of marijuana among U.S. troops fighting in the Vietnam War.
- U.S. and North Korean officials met for the first time at Panmunjom regarding the recent seizure of the USS Pueblo by North Korean forces.
- Born: Kenny Albert, American sportscaster; in New York City

== February 3, 1968 (Saturday) ==
- Denmark held a royal wedding at Copenhagen, as Princess Benedikte, second in line to the throne as the daughter of King Frederik IX and the younger sister of Princess Margrethe, married Richard zu Sayn-Wittgenstein-Berleburg. The wedding was limited to 200 family guests and no diplomatic representatives were present.
- The Sanremo Music Festival, one of Europe's biggest music competitions, was won by Sergio Endrigo for "Canzone per te" ("Song for You"), performed by Roberto Carlos.
- Following many unpopular decisions including devaluation of the pound Harold Wilson's Labour Party slumped in the polls against the Conservatives.
- Born:
  - Vlade Divac, Serbian basketball player and executive who played in Yugoslavia for six seasons, followed by 17 seasons in the NBA; in Prijepolje, Serbian SR, Yugoslavia
  - Gregory S. Brown, American historian specializing in French and cultural history; in New York City

== February 4, 1968 (Sunday) ==
- Martin Luther King Jr., returned to the Ebenezer Baptist Church where he had been pastor, and delivered what would prove to be his final sermon there. Made two months before his assassination on April 4, his sermon was titled "The Drum Major Instinct", about the human desire for recognition of one's good works. Citing Mark 10:35, King would go on to say that one's ambition should be a life of service, and added, "I just want to leave a committed life behind." A recording of the sermon would be played at King's funeral.
- Porsche automobiles came in first, second and third place in the 24 Hours of Daytona motor event. The winning car, the new Porsche 907, was so far ahead of the second place team, that "five unnecessary driver changers were made in the last two hours, so each member of the Porsche team could share the honor of the triumph"; when the 24 hours came to an end, the three Porsches "swept across the finish line abreast, taking the checkered flag of victory together".
- Eleven students from the Jesuit University of Guadalajara died in a sudden snowstorm that overwhelmed their party of 29 who were attempting to climb the 17,343-foot (5,286 m) Iztaccihuatl volcano. The hikers had gotten as far as the 14,100-foot (4,300 m) level when they were trapped by the weather.
- The SR.N4 (Saunders-Roe Nautical 4), the world's largest hovercraft, was launched. It would enter commercial service on August 1, and would run for 22 years, ceasing on October 1, 2000.
- Nine residents, all transients, of the Hotel Roosevelt on Boston's skid row died in a fire, and another 15 were injured.
- Died: Neal Cassady, 43, American icon of the Beat Generation, was found in a coma beside a railroad track outside of San Miguel de Allende in Mexico, and died in a hospital without regaining consciousness.

== February 5, 1968 (Monday) ==
- Greece passed legislation to end a practice that had been given the name "baby marketing", with parents legally selling their infants to brokers who would then resell them to purchasers in the United States and the Netherlands. According to the law's proponents, "A boy, purchased on the Greek market for around $US400 could fetch from $3,000 to $5,000 in America. Girls were said to sell for about half that figure." In 1966, the number of babies "exported" from Greece was claimed to be 1,000 per year. Under the new law, no Greek child, being adopted by a foreigner, would be allowed to leave the country until a social worker filed a report and a court gave its approval.
- The sinking of the British fishing trawler Ross Cleveland killed 18 of the 19 crew aboard. The ship capsized in a storm off of the coast of Isafjordur at Iceland. The only survivor was the ship's cook, who managed to escape before the ship was seen to go down. The Ross Cleveland was the third fishing vessel from the English port of Hull to have been lost in Iceland within less than a month. The St Romanus had disappeared with 20 crew on January 11, and the Kingston Peridot had vanished with a crew of 20 on January 26.
- Saturn V Orbital Workshop (OWS) study teams began planning the first Apollo Applications Project (AAP) missions, with the use of the powerful Saturn V rocket to create a space station with quarters for a crew of nine and a full orbiting laboratory, to operate for at least two years.
- A conference to reform the Constitution of Canada opened in Ottawa.
- Born:
  - Roberto Alomar, Puerto Rican Major League Baseball second baseman who was inducted into the Baseball Hall of Fame; in Ponce
  - Marcus Grönholm, Finnish rally driver and world champion in 2000 and 2002; in Kauniainen
  - Han Ong, Philippine-born American playwright and MacArthur Grant recipient; in Manila
  - Mevlüt Çavuşoğlu, Turkish diplomat, Minister of Foreign Affairs; in Alanya
- Died: Luckey Roberts (Charles Luckyth Roberts), 80, African-American pianist and composer known for "Moonlight Cocktail"

== February 6, 1968 (Tuesday) ==
- The 1968 Winter Olympics, with 1,350 athletes from 37 nations, opened in Grenoble in the Alps in France. French skier Alain Calmat, who had won the 1965 World Skiing Championship, lit the Olympic torch.
- Rashid Karami resigned as Prime Minister of Lebanon along with his entire cabinet as the Middle East nation prepared for elections. Karami would be replaced on February 8 by senior statesman Abdallah El-Yafi in order to form a caretaker government to supervise the voting process.
- The Beatles, Mike Love, Mia Farrow, Donovan and others traveled to India to visit Maharishi Mahesh Yogi at Rishikesh in India's Uttarakhand state.

== February 7, 1968 (Wednesday) ==
- "It became necessary to destroy the town to save it" became one of the most famous quotes arising out of the Vietnam War, as a news story by Associated Press war correspondent Peter Arnett was published worldwide about the death and destruction caused by American forces during the retaking of the South Vietnamese coastal city of Bến Tre. At least 1,000 civilians had died and 45 percent of Bến Tre's buildings were destroyed in the bombardment by American airplanes and shelling by U.S. Navy ships, a measure taken as a last resort after 2,500 Viet Cong had taken control of the city. The quote (often restated as "We had to destroy the village in order to save it") was attributed by Arnett to "a U.S. major"; later in the story, Arnett referred to his interview with U.S. Air Force Major Chester L. Brown, who had directed the bombing. The phrase, however, was actually coined by the reporter; Arnett asked the question, "So you had to destroy the village in order to save it?" and then attributed the words to Major Brown.
- All 102 people aboard an Indian Air Force plane, many of them members of The Garhwal Rifles, were killed when the Antonov An-12 disappeared in the Himalayan mountains while flying to Chandigarh from Leh. No trace of the plane would be found for 33 years until an Italian mountaineering expedition's discovery of several Garhwal Rifle badges in 2001. In 2003, glacial movement at the 17,323-foot (5,280 m) level of one of the Chandrabhaga Peaks of the Dhaka Glacier would lead to the disinterment of several aircraft parts and the body of one of the servicemen, Bali Ram. Three more bodies would be found in 2007. On August 31, 2013, another soldier's remains would be recovered, although most of the servicemen remain entombed under the ice.
- Nine people were killed and 69 others injured in a fire and subsequent explosions at a meat-packing plant in Chicago. The blast, which occurred at 4:27 in the afternoon, happened when a gasoline tanker truck was traveling through an alley behind the Mickelberry's Food Products plant at 801 West 49th Place, and struck a pipe on the plant's outside wall. The tank ruptured, sending a pool of gasoline into the plant's basement, where it reached a furnace and ignited. Five people were killed immediately, and four more died of their burn injuries.
- Shortly after midnight, the Battle of Khe Sanh and the Vietnam War took a new turn as the North Vietnamese Army attacked with tanks and other armored vehicles for the first time. The 304th Division of the North Vietnamese Army overran the U.S. Army Special Forces camp at Lang Vei with 11 Soviet PT-76 tanks. In all, 316 defenders of the camp would be killed; all but seven of them were Montagnards fighting for South Vietnam and members of the Royal Laotian Army.
- Born:
  - Peter Bondra, Slovak ice hockey player who played 17 seasons in the National Hockey League from 1990 to 2007; in Lutsk, Ukrainian SSR, Soviet Union
  - Sully Erna, American rock musician and singer, frontman of Godsmack, as Salvatore Paul Erna Jr. in Lawrence, Massachusetts
- Died: Nick Adams, 36, American television actor best known for starring in the TV series The Rebel, died of an apparent drug overdose. The inquest could not agree whether his death was suicide or an accident, but murder has also been suggested.

== February 8, 1968 (Thursday) ==
- The Orangeburg massacre took place in Orangeburg, South Carolina, when officers of the South Carolina Highway Patrol fired into a crowd of African-American students on the South Carolina State College campus. Three students — Harry Ezekial Smith, 19; Samuel Hammond Jr., 18; and Delano Middleton, 17 — were killed, another 27 were wounded. Middleton, a high school student, had been visiting friends on the campus, and was shot four times. On Monday, the college's NAACP chapter had organized a move to desegregate the All-Star Bowling Lanes near the campus; a brawl broke out the next day when more African-American students showed up at the bowling alley, and the day after, tensions were high as SCSC students made plans to picket the Orangeburg City Hall. The triggering incident was when a group of students was building a bonfire at the edge of the campus near the highway patrolmen's command post; someone threw a piece of wood and, whether intended or accidentally, it struck a patrolman. When other officers saw the man fall down, they began firing into the crowd. This was the first instance of police killing student protestors at an American campus.
- Former Alabama Governor George C. Wallace formally announced his intention to run as an independent candidate in the 1968 United States presidential election.
- The classic science fiction film Planet of the Apes premiered at Capitol Theatre in New York City.
- Born: Gary Coleman, American child actor and star of the situation comedy Diff'rent Strokes; in Zion, Illinois (d. 2010)

== February 9, 1968 (Friday) ==
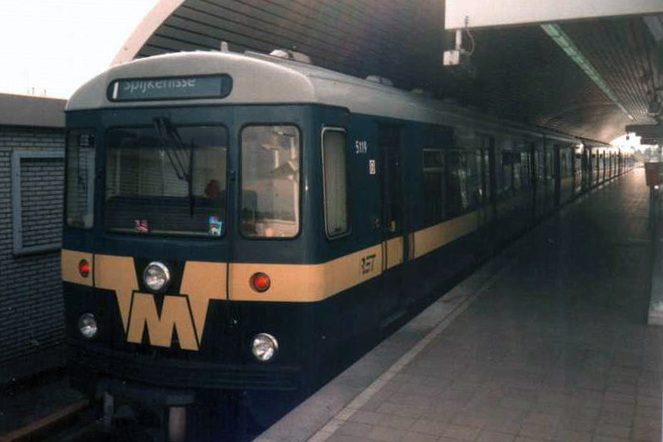
The four-mile long Rotterdam subway

- The Netherlands inaugurated its very first subway transit system, the Rotterdam Metro, with the opening of one of the world's smallest subway systems. For its first 14 years of existence, the city's Metro, ceremonially opened by Crown Princess Beatrix, had only 3.7 miles (6.0 km) of track. However, it was successful in easing the city's traffic jams; a reporter noted that during rush hour, "Instead of taking 90 minutes by car, Rotterdam's commuters can now do the trip from one end of the town to the other in 12 minutes by subway."
- The Soviet government newspaper Komsomolskaya Pravda, whose audience was the young Communist Party members who belonged to the Party's youth wing, the Komsomol, published an unusually frank admission that the Soviet Union lagged behind the capitalist Western nations in almost every aspect of economic development. Noting that a 1961 prediction by former party leader Nikita Khrushchev— that the Soviet Union would surpass the United States in its standard of living by 1970— was not going to happen and was not even close to occurring, the newspaper survey presented statistics that Soviet citizens had 6.75% as many automobiles, one-fourth the number of radios, less than half as much new clothing and half as much meat and dairy products as Americans. The survey noted, however, that the Soviets were ahead in the number of physicians, the amount spent per student on education, and the amount of housing construction.
- A bus accident killed 21 people in Ceylon (now Sri Lanka) near the capital city of Colombo, after the vehicle fell 150 feet (46 m) off of a cliff.
- Born: Alejandra Guzmán, Mexican singer-songwriter and actress who had a #1 hit in 2006 with "Volverte a Amar"; in Mexico City

== February 10, 1968 (Saturday) ==
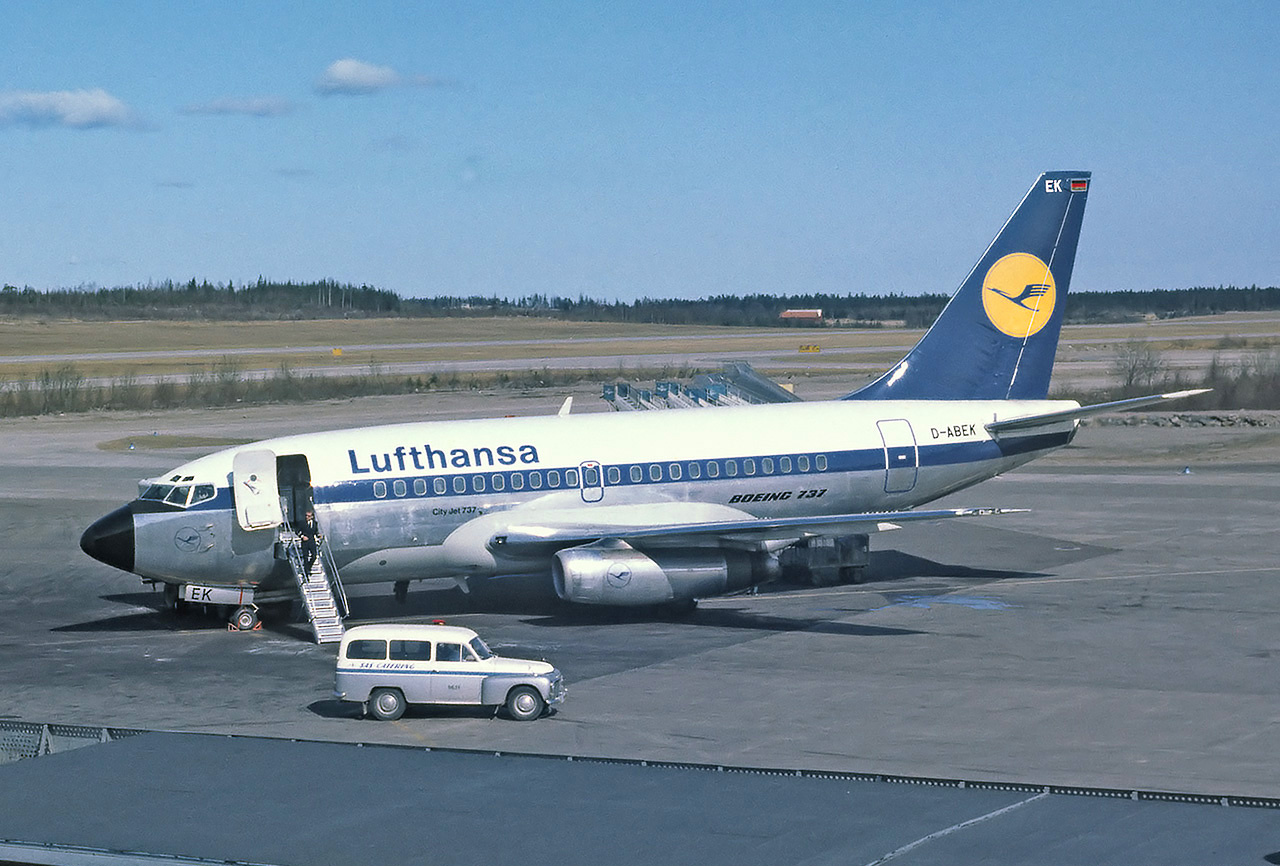
The Boeing 737

- The Boeing 737 "CityJet", a twin-engine jet aircraft, was used to fly commercial airline passengers for the first time, as the West German carrier Lufthansa inaugurated its CityJet service, using the smaller 737–100 series of airplanes for short "feeder" flights within the German borders. The first flight was made out of Hamburg.
- Born:
  - Garrett Reisman, American astronaut who spent 107 days at the International Space Station in multiple missions; in Morristown, New Jersey
  - Atika Suri, Indonesian news anchor; in Indragiri Hulu Regency, Riau province
- Died: Lieutenant General Harry Schmidt, 81, Commander of the U.S. Marines Fifth Amphibious Corps in the successful campaign in the Battle of Iwo Jima

== February 11, 1968 (Sunday) ==
- The fourth, and current version of New York City's Madison Square Garden arena was opened to the public at Eighth Avenue and 34th Street, fifteen blocks away from the previous Madison Square Garden at Eighth Avenue and 49th Street. The new arena was inaugurated with a show, featuring Bob Hope and Bing Crosby, billed as "The Night of the Century". Earlier in the day, the older arena hosted its final New York Rangers hockey game, a 3–3 tie with the Detroit Red Wings.
- Born:
  - Mo Willems, award-winning American children's book author known for the Pigeon series, the Knuffle Bunny series, and the Elephant and Piggie series of books; as Maurice Charles Williams in Des Plaines, Illinois
  - Lavinia Agache, Romanian gymnast; in Căiuți
- Died:
  - Howard Lindsay, 78, American playwright and actor known for Life with Father, State of the Union and The Sound of Music
  - Muriel Lester, 84, British peace activist

== February 12, 1968 (Monday) ==
- Two weeks after the Tet Offensive in the Vietnam War, U.S. Army General William C. Westmoreland asked President Johnson to commit an additional 10,500 troops to the War. President Johnson was advised to grant Westmoreland's request by U.S. Ambassador to Saigon Ellsworth Bunker, Assistant U.S. Commander in South Vietnam Creighton Abrams, Head of Pacification Robert Kromer, Secretary of Defence Robert McNamara, Secretary of State Dean Rusk, CIA Director Richard Helms, General Earle Wheeler, Former U.S. Ambassador to Saigon Maxwell Taylor and Presidential Advisor Walt Rostow. The U.S. Department of Defense publicly announced the commitment of new troops the following day. The President's thinking behind the decision can be heard in a recorded telephone conversation with Secretary of Defence Robert McNamara.
- The Memphis sanitation strike began in Memphis, Tennessee, after the city's 1,300 garbage men walked out on strike because of low pay and unsanitary conditions, as well as defective equipment that had led to the death of two workers on February 1. Civil rights activist Martin Luther King Jr. would come to Memphis to support the strikers, and would be assassinated there on April 4.
- Members of the 2nd Division of the South Korean Marines shot and killed 80 unarmed civilians in the South Vietnam village of Phong Nhi after the Korean unit had come under sniper fire while patrolling the Quảng Nam province.
- Satellite photography showed that the spy ship USS Pueblo (recently captured by North Korea in International Waters) had been moved from the North Korean port of Wonsan to a more secure naval base.
- Around 300 unarmed civilians in the South Vietnam city of Huế were murdered and buried in a mass grave by invading members of the invading North Vietnamese army.
- The 25th Golden Globe Awards were held. In the Heat of the Night won the award for Best Picture – Drama, while The Graduate took home the award for Best Picture – Comedy.
- Born:
  - Christopher McCandless, American adventurer who went by the name "Alexander Supertramp" (d. 1992); in Stampede Trail, Alaska
  - Chynna Phillips, American singer and actress, and the daughter of musicians John and Michelle Phillips; in Los Angeles
  - Josh Brolin, American film actor, and the son of actor James Brolin; in Santa Monica, California

== February 13, 1968 (Tuesday) ==
- The 43-year old Madison Square Garden held its final event, the annual Westminster Kennel Club Dog Show. The New York City landmark, superseded by a new Madison Square Garden, was torn down later in the year.
- Born:
  - Kelly Hu, Chinese-American actress (X-Men 2, The Scorpion King, Nash Bridges); in Honolulu
  - Niamh Kavanagh, Irish singer; in Finglas
- Died:
  - Mae Marsh, 73, American silent film actress and leading lady who had appeared in The Birth of a Nation in 1915, and in Intolerance in 1916
  - Ildebrando Pizzetti, 87, Italian classical music composer

== February 14, 1968 (Wednesday) ==
- The second-tallest man-made structure in the world, the 2,060-foot (630 m) tall KXJB Tower at Galesburg, North Dakota, near Fargo, was accidentally knocked down by a U.S. Marine Corps helicopter that was on a training flight from Grand Forks Air Force Base. All four men on the helicopter were killed after the aircraft struck a supporting guy-wire and then the television tower itself. Fargo's CBS affiliate, KXJB Channel 4 (now KRDK-TV), went off the air. The tower had been second in height only to the world's tallest man-made structure, the nearby KTHI tower, which was 2,068 feet (630 m) tall.
- U.S. Army General Earle G. Wheeler, the Chairman of the Joint Chiefs of Staff, called a press conference after rumors circulated that he had told a closed congressional committee hearing that he would not rule out using nuclear weapons in the Vietnam War. Asked about the prospect of a nuclear strike to prevent the fall of the critical Khe Sanh Combat Base, General Wheeler did not completely reject using atomic bombs, and said, "I do not think they will be required to defend Khe Sanh but I refuse to speculate any further."
- Born:
  - Scott McClellan, White House Press Secretary for U.S. President George W. Bush from 2003 to 2005; in Austin, Texas
  - Phill Lewis, Ugandan-born American television actor and director; in Kampala
- Died: Pierre Veuillot, 55, French cardinal and Roman Catholic Archbishop of Paris, died of leukemia only six months after taking office.

== February 15, 1968 (Thursday) ==
- The United Kingdom fired its first submarine-launched ballistic missile (SLBM) when HMS Resolution made a test launch of an unarmed Polaris while performing sea trails off of the American coast near Cape Kennedy in Florida.
- Born: Gloria Trevi (stage name for Gloria de los Ángeles Treviño), Mexican pop singer; in Monterrey
- Died: Little Walter (Marion Walter Jacobs), 38, American blues musician, died of coronary thrombosis thought to have been caused by injuries sustained in a fight the previous evening.

== February 16, 1968 (Friday) ==
- The world's first 9-1-1 emergency call was placed in Haleyville, Alabama, by Alabama Speaker of the House Rankin Fite, from the Haleyville City Hall; the call was routed by the operator to the city's police station, where it was referred to U.S. Representative Tom Bevill.The United Kingdom had introduced the 999 emergency number on June 30, 1937.
- An arsonist killed 12 people inside a bar at the Randolph Hotel at 107 West Reed Street in Moberly, Missouri. William Edward Coleman, angry after having been banned from buying drinks at the Randolph Tavern, walked in with a five-gallon bucket filled with gasoline, splashed it throughout the tavern, then set fire to it at about 3:00 in the afternoon. The four women and eight men who were killed had rushed to the back of the bar in the mistaken belief that they were heading to an exit. Coleman would be convicted of the murder of one of the victims on September 25, 1969, and sentenced to death, which would become a sentence of life imprisonment after the 1972 decision invalidating existing capital punishment laws.
- With cameras rolling, North Vietnam released three American prisoners of war, the first of nine, to the custody of peace activists Daniel Berrigan and Howard Zinn. As part of the propaganda event, the POWs each "expressed their thanks to their captors for the humane and lenient treatment" that they had received, and "expressed remorse over the war". All but one of the nine met the order of release approved by the senior ranking officers (SROs) in each POW camp ("sick and injured first, then enlisted personnel, and the remaining officers by order of shoot-down"). The exception would be a Navy seaman who was given permission by his superiors to accept release because he had memorized the names of all his fellow prisoners of war.
- The Selective Service System of the United States revised its rules for deferments and exemptions from the draft, allowing the induction of most graduate students who were pursuing a master's degree, a decision that affected 600,000 men. Students in medical school, dental school, or other health field remained exempt, as did those in a theological seminary who planned on "going into ministry".
- The NBC television network announced that Star Trek, tentatively set for cancellation, would be renewed for a third season. With the decision having been made following a well-publicized letter writing campaign, a voiceover at the close of that evening's episode informed the viewers and asked that no further mail be sent.
- The crash of a Taiwanese Civil Air Transport airlines Boeing 727 killed 21 of the 63 people on board when the plane attempted an emergency landing while flying from Hong Kong to Taipei. At the time, C.A.T. was largely owned and secretly operated by the U.S. Central Intelligence Agency.
- Born: Warren Ellis, British comic book writer (Transmetropolitan, Planetary); in Rochford, Essex

== February 17, 1968 (Saturday) ==
- At the Winter Olympics in Grenoble in France, skier Jean-Claude Killy won the men's slalom to take his third gold medal of the Games. Two other competitors had faster runs, but Haakon Mjoen of Norway missed one of 69 gates on the second of two runs, and Karl Schranz of Austria, who had done exceptionally in his first slalom run, suddenly halted on the second attempt after complaining "that a French policeman had gotten in his way". Killy's sweep of alpine skiing's "triple crown" (gold medals in the slalom, giant slalom and downhill races) has been accomplished by only one other competitor, Toni Sailer of Austria in 1956.
- The Naismith Memorial Basketball Hall of Fame opened in Springfield, Massachusetts on the campus of Springfield College, where the game had been invented by Professor James Naismith in 1891. Jim Naismith of Corpus Christi, Texas, the son of the inventor, presented the original copy of the rules that his father had typed.
- Legislative elections began in Papua New Guinea, at the time administered by Australia as the eastern half of the island of New Guinea. There were 1.2 million people eligible to vote for representatives in the 94-member House of Assembly, and rival tribes called a truce so that people could cast their votes.
- Pink Floyd launched their World Tour with a concert in Terneuzen in the Netherlands.
- Died:
  - Kailash Nath Katju, 80, Indian politician who had served as Law Minister, Home Minister and Defence Minister for Prime Minister Nehru. He was also executive in three states of India, as Governor of Odisha (1947–1948) and West Bengal (1948–1951), then later as Chief Minister for Madhya Pradesh (1957–1962).
  - Donald Wolfit, 65, British stage, film and television actor

== February 18, 1968 (Sunday) ==
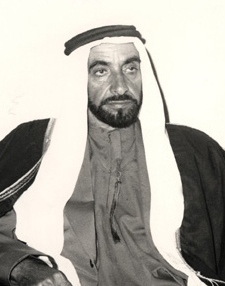
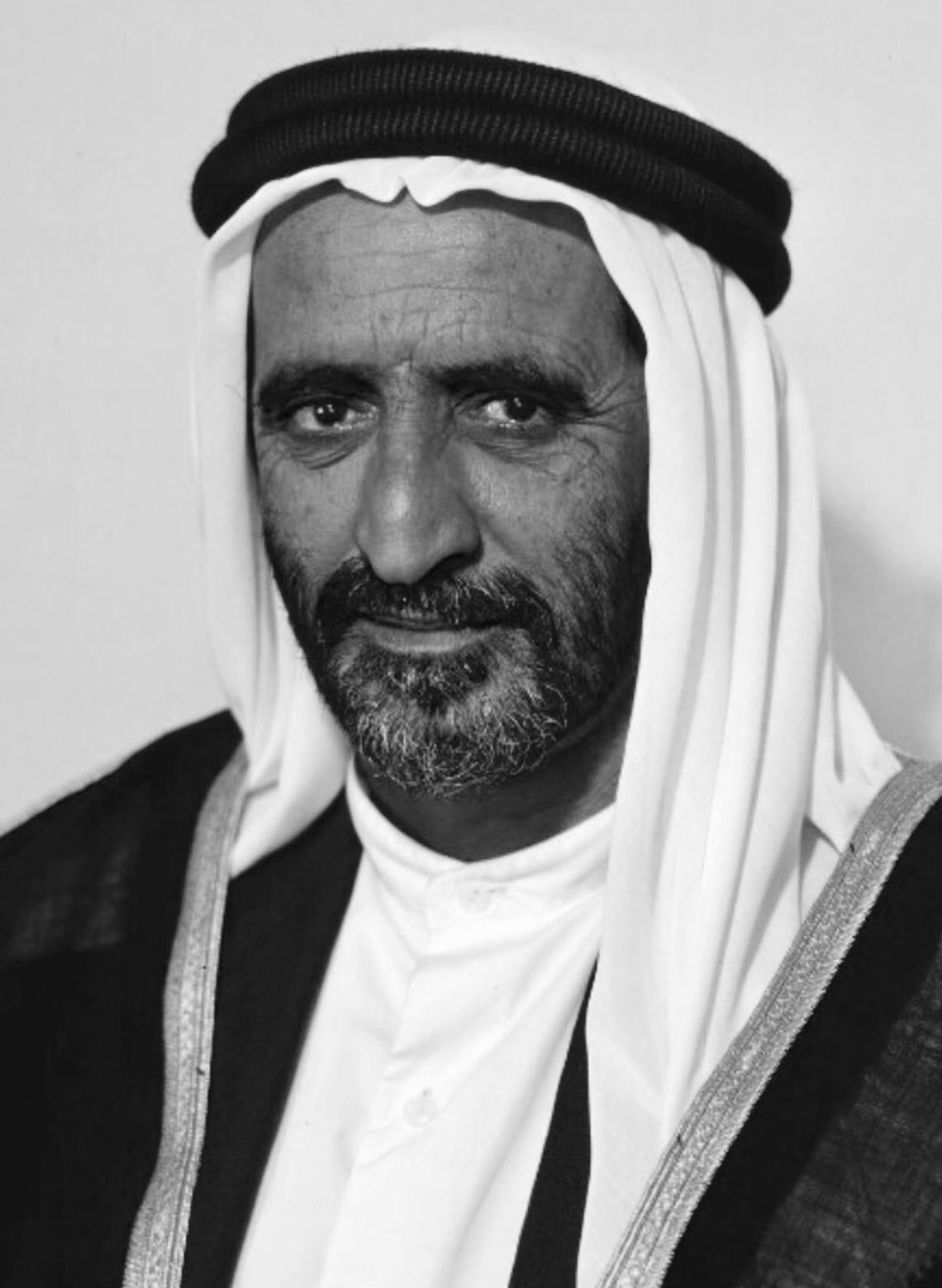
Emir Zayed of Abu Dhabi and Emir Rashid of Dubai
- The emirs of Abu Dhabi and Dubai met at the village of as-Sameeh and announced their decision to make a federation of their two emirates, in what would be the first step in creating the United Arab Emirates. At the close of their announcement, Emir Zayed of Abu Dhabi and Emir Rashid of Dubai invited the rulers of the five other kingdoms within the British protectorate (known then as the "Trucial States") to join them in a union. On February 27, the rulers of the seven other Trucial States, as well as those of the emirates of Bahrain and Qatar, would sign a pledge to form a "Federation of Arab Emirates". By the time that the area was granted on December 2, 1971, however, the UAE would consist of six of the seven states (Abu Dhabi and Dubai, as well as Ajman, Fujairah, Kalba and Sharjah), but not Bahrain or Qatar. The seventh state, Ras al-Khaimah, would join two months later.
- The leaders of China's Communist Party, its State Council, its Central Military Committee and the Central Cultural Revolution Panel announced the "Notice of February 18", directing financial institutions to freeze the bank deposits of on any persons accused of being part of ten categories of undesirables ("traitors, spies, capitalist roaders in the communist party, landlords, rich peasants, counterrevolutionaries, bad elements, rightists who have not been well reformed, counterrevolutionary bourgeois and counterrevolutionary intellectuals").
- The first snowboarding contest was held, a couple of years after the creation of the sport in which skiers ride a laminated wooden board in the same manner as a surfboard. The competition took place at the Muskegon State Park outside Muskegon, Michigan at a slope called Blockhouse Hill.
- Born:
  - Dennis Satin, Bulgarian-born German film director; in Sofia
  - Molly Ringwald, American actress; in Roseville, California

== February 19, 1968 (Monday) ==
- Misterogers' Neighborhood (later called Mister Rogers' Neighborhood), described at the time by one critic as "probably the finest children's television series ever made", debuted nationwide in the U.S. on National Educational Television at 5:30 in the afternoon. While Presbyterian minister and child psychologist Fred Rogers had been on the air on Pittsburgh's WQED-TV since 1963, and had expanded by 1966 to some other educational stations in Chicago and along the east coast, it had run out of funding until the Sears Roebuck Foundation and the Ford Foundation made grants for new productions; the show had gone off the air in 1967, but was shown in reruns on stations after parents of preschoolers and young children demanded its return. It would then continue as a staple of Public Broadcasting System programming after NET's assets were acquired by PBS and would continue until Rogers's retirement on August 31, 2001.
- The International Court of Justice, commonly known as the "World Court", settled the dispute between India and Pakistan over the Rann of Kutch salt marshes on the border between the two nations. The three member arbitration panel awarded 90% of the Rann to India and 10% to Pakistan. With the exception of granting Pakistan the northern part of Rann, the panel restored the area to the areas occupied before the 1965 war between the two nations.
- A vote, in Canada's House of Commons, to raise income taxes by five percent, failed 82 to 84. Led by Robert Stanfield, opposition members of the Progressive Conservative Party called on Liberal Prime Minister Lester B. Pearson and his coalition government to resign and to call new elections. Pearson— whose Liberal Party was looking for his successor in the wake of his announced retirement— declined to step down.
- The Florida Education Association, a labor union for most of the schoolteachers in Florida, called the first statewide teachers' walkout in American history, forcing the closure of the schools in 51 of Florida's 67 counties. The unprecedented statewide walkout would continue for a month, and would inspire similar teacher strikes elsewhere in the United States.
- Fifteen of the 20 crew on the Panamanian cargo ship Capitaine Frangos were killed when the ship sank after colliding with an unidentified ship at the entrance to the Dardanelles in Turkey.

== February 20, 1968 (Tuesday) ==
- For the second time in its history, the Indian state of West Bengal was put under President's rule under Article 356 of the Constitution of India, after the collapse of its coalition government and the resignation of Chief Minister P. C. Ghosh. The state would remain under national control for a little more than a year, until February 25, 1969, when a new government would be formed under the leadership of Ajoy Mukherjee.
- Lester Pearson gave the first-ever televised address by a Prime Minister of Canada to the nation as he told Canadians that he would table a confidence motion scheduled for the next day to prove that his Liberal Party could still maintain a government. After a week of filibustering by the Opposition (the Progressive Conservative Party of Canada, led by Robert Stanfield), the confidence motion passed.
- The first batch of TDD units (also referred to as TTYs), designed to allow the deaf to communicate over the telephone by transmitting writing, was distributed by American Telephone and Telegraph (AT&T) after the conclusion of litigation over a patent dispute.
- The China Academy of Space Technology (CAST) was founded in Beijing.
- Died: Judge Arthur G. Klein, 63, Jewish American politician, U.S. Congressman for New York (1946–1956) and state Supreme Court justice since 1957

== February 21, 1968 (Wednesday) ==
- The British Trans-Arctic Expedition, led by English explorer Wally Herbert with a team of three other men (Roy Koerner, Allan Gill, and Kenneth Hedges) and 34 huskies, departed from Point Barrow in Alaska on what Herbert called "the one pioneer journey" left for mankind on the Earth's surface, a trip across the top of the world. After being stranded during the Arctic winter of 1968–69 (and supplied by air-drops from the Royal Canadian Air Force, the group would travel northward on the 156th meridian west and reach the North Pole on April 5, 1969, then continue to the other side of the globe, southward along the 24th meridian east to the island of Vesle Tavleøya in Norway, arriving on May 29, 1969, following a journey of 3,620 miles (5,830 km). The journey would come to a safe end on June 11, with a helicopter transporting the four men to a homebound ship.
- University students in Egypt's two largest cities, Cairo and Alexandria, began an uprising in support of an ongoing workers strike, marking the first mass student arrest in Egypt since 1953. In the week that followed, 635 people would be arrested in Cairo, and 77 civilians and 146 policemen would be injured, with two workers being killed.
- Surveyor 7 was turned off permanently, six weeks after it had landed on the Moon. The lunar probe had functioned poorly after being reactivated on February 12 and "there would not be another NASA transmission from the lunar surface until the first landing by an Apollo crew" on July 20, 1969.
- King Baudouin of Belgium dissolved the Belgian Federal Parliament after accepting the resignation of Prime Minister Paul Vanden Boeynants and the government ministers, and called for elections to be held on March 31.
- McGraw-Hill, Inc., outbid eight other publishers and paid $150,000 for the U.S. rights to Hunter Davies' authorized biography of the Beatles.
- Blood, Sweat & Tears released their debut album, Child Is Father to the Man.
- Died: Howard Florey, 69, Australian pathologist who was awarded the 1945 Nobel Prize in Physiology or Medicine laureate for his role in developing penicillin

== February 22, 1968 (Thursday) ==
- British Home Secretary James Callaghan announced his government's decision to introduce the Commonwealth Immigrants Act 1968 in response to the arrival of 7,000 Asian refugees who had been expelled from Kenya and who, as members of a British Commonwealth nation, had British passports. The law would pass both Houses of Parliament on February 27 and would receive royal assent on March 1, limiting the immigration of people with British passports into the United Kingdom to those who had a "substantial connection" with Britain.
- The first signs of what would be called the "Prague Spring" began in Czechoslovakia when Communist Party First Secretary Alexander Dubček announced, in the presence of visiting Soviet party chief Leonid Brezhnev, that steps would be taken to create "the widest possible democratization of the entire socio-political system."
- Born:
  - Jeri Ryan, American television actress known for portraying the character "Seven of Nine" on Star Trek: Voyager; in Munich, West Germany
  - Brad Nowell, American musician and lead singer of the band Sublime; in Long Beach, California (d. 1996)
- Died:
  - Peter Arno, 64, American cartoonist for The New Yorker
  - Dudley Murphy, 70, American film director

== February 23, 1968 (Friday) ==
- The newly incorporated Hyundai Motor Company of South Korea, represented by its president, Chung Ju-yung, signed an agreement with the Ford Motor Company of the United States for a joint venture in which Ford Motor would supply Hyundai with the technology and equipment to construct a plant in Ulsan, in return for a percentage of the profits.
- The first victim of a Scottish serial killer, nicknamed "Bible John" by the media, was found in Glasgow. Patricia Docker, a 25-year-old nurse, had been raped and strangled after having last been seen at a Glasgow dance hall.
- Died: Fannie Hurst, 82, American novelist and short story writer

== February 24, 1968 (Saturday) ==
- All 37 people on board a Royal Air Lao airplane were killed when the DC-3 crashed into the Mekong River while on a domestic scheduled passenger flight from Vientiane to Sainyabuli.
- Fleetwood Mac released their self-titled debut album. Most of the songs were written and sung by band leaders Peter Green and Jeremy Spencer.
- Born: Mitch Hedberg, American comedian; in Saint Paul, Minnesota (d. 2005)

== February 25, 1968 (Sunday) ==
- The Archbishop Makarios III (Michael Mouskos) was re-elected as President of Cyprus by an overwhelming majority (95.45%) of Greek Cypriot voters. Makarios received 220,911 of the 231,438 valid ballots; his opponent, Takis Evdokas, who was an advocate for enosis (the annexation of Cyprus by Greece) got 8,577 votes for 3.71%, while another 1,950 ballots were declared invalid. Under the island nation's constitution, Greek Cypriots voted for the President and Turkish Cypriots voted for the Vice President.
- Zap Comix, the first successful title of the underground comix genre, an alternative to standard comic books, published its first issue. The book was drawn and written by 24-year old San Francisco cartoonist Robert Crumb, and his wife Dana sold the initial copies in the Haight-Ashbury neighborhood along with two other people. The next day, a small distribution company, Third World Distribution, would purchase 500 copies for distribution in outlets throughout the Bay Area.
- Major Jan Šejna of the Czechoslovak Army fled Czechoslovakia after falling out of favor with President Antonín Novotný, who was planning to use the military to regain his position as Communist Party First Secretary. Šejna would eventually defect to the United States, becoming the highest-ranking military officer of a Warsaw Pact nation to flee to the NATO alliance.
- The Khmer Rouge, Cambodia's Communist guerrilla movement, launched their first widespread campaign, "The Blow of 25 February", with simultaneous attacks on military installations in Battambang, Takéo, Kampot, Koh Kong, Kompong Chhnang and Kompong Speu and seized rifles and machine guns.
- The Indian state of Uttar Pradesh was placed under President's rule, which would last until February 26, 1969, by declaration of President Zakir Husain.
- Léopold Sédar Senghor was re-elected as President of Senegal without opposition on the ballot.
- Born:
  - Thomas G:son (stage name for Thomas Gustafsson), Swedish song composer; in Skövde
  - Sandrine Kiberlain, French film actress; in Boulogne-Billancourt
- Died: Camille Huysmans, 96, Prime Minister of Belgium from 1946 to 1947)

== February 26, 1968 (Monday) ==
- The Double Helix: A Personal Account of the Discovery of the Structure of DNA, by Professor James D. Watson of Harvard University, was published for the first time, in a release by Atheneum Publishers. The previous May, the Harvard University Press had passed on the opportunity to publish the groundbreaking book that became a bestseller.
- The South Vietnamese city of Hue was declared secure and rid of the Viet Cong and North Vietnamese forces that had captured it less than four weeks earlier during the Tet Offensive. The day before, the historic Imperial Palace was recaptured by I Corps of the Army of the Republic of Vietnam and by the United States Marines and the United States Army.
- The Communist Party of Czechoslovakia adopted the first draft of an "Action Program" for allowing more freedom of the press within the Eastern European nation "and, in the longer run, the federalization of Czechoslovakia" with greater autonomy for the Slovak minority in the eastern part of the nation in federation with the Czech people in the west.
- A fire killed 22 female patients, all but one of whom was over 60 years old, and injured 14 when the blaze swept through their ward at the Shelton Hospital, a mental institution located outside the English city of Shrewsbury. The ward, housing the most severely disturbed patients, was the only one that was locked from the outside.
- Harold T. Luskin, Chief Advanced Design Engineer at Lockheed-California Company, and former American Institute of Aeronautics and Astronautics President, was named NASA Deputy Associate Administrator for Manned Space Flight (Technical) effective March 18.

== February 27, 1968 (Tuesday) ==
- CBS News anchorman Walter Cronkite told an audience of 9,000,000 viewers, "It seems now more certain than ever that the bloody experience of Vietnam is to end in a stalemate... it is increasingly clear to this reporter that the only rational way out then will be to negotiate, not as victors but as an honorable people who lived up to their pledge to defend democracy, and did the best they could. This is Walter Cronkite. Good night." The comment came at the close of a 30-minute CBS News special, Report from Vietnam, which had commenced at 10:30 p.m. Eastern time. Although U.S. President Johnson is said to have remarked to advisers the next day that "If I've lost Cronkite, I've lost the war!" (or in some accounts, "I've lost the American people."), historian W. Joseph Campbell would note after research that "Under scrutiny, the 'Cronkite moment' dissolves as illusory— a chimera, a media-driven myth."
- President Johnson visited Dallas for the first time since he had been sworn in as president at Dallas Love Field on November 22, 1963. Johnson spoke to about 10,000 delegates of National Rural Electric Cooperative convention and told them that he believed that the Vietnam War had reached "a turning point".
- Born: Matt Stairs, Canadian Major League Baseball designated hitter and holder of the record for most pinch-hit home runs in Major League Baseball (MLB) history with 23.; in Saint John, New Brunswick
- Died: Frankie Lymon, 25, American rhythm and blues singer who achieved a hit at age 13 with the 1956 hit "Why Do Fools Fall in Love" with the doo-wop group The Teenagers, died of a heroin overdose.

== February 28, 1968 (Wednesday) ==
- The township of Auroville was founded in India's union territory of Pondicherry by Hindu spiritual leader Mirra Alfassa, and named for her mentor, Sri Aurobindo. In the inaugural ceremony, "about 5,000 people from some 125 nations gathered at a banyan tree in the future city", each bringing some dirt from their homelands to be placed in an urn. Forty years later, Auroville (which originally was conceived as home to 50,000 people) had 1,700 residents from 35 nations.
- Michigan Governor George Romney became the first major presidential candidate to withdraw from the 1968 campaign. Romney had declared his intention to seek the nomination of the Republican Party, but concluded that he was well behind former U.S. Vice President Richard M. Nixon in raising funds for the New Hampshire primary.
- Canada's Prime Minister Pearson won a vote of confidence in the House of Commons of Canada by a margin of 138 to 119, bringing an end to the crisis that had begun nine days earlier when his tax proposal failed.
- All but one of the 23 servicemen on board a U.S. Marine Corps CH-46 Sea Knight helicopter operating in South Vietnam were killed when it was struck by ground fire and crashed about 11 miles (18 km) northeast of the Khe Sanh Combat Base.
- The annual Rio Carnival in Rio de Janeiro ended on Ash Wednesday after four days. During the carnival, there were 83 deaths (14 of them murders) and more than 5,000 injuries.
- Soul on Ice, the classic memoir of African-American activist Eldridge Cleaver, was released by the McGraw-Hill Publishing Company.
- Several changes took place within the First Gorton Ministry of the new Australian government, including the renaming of Charles Barnes' department as the Ministry for External Territories. Future Prime Minister Malcolm Fraser joined the Cabinet as Minister for Education and Science, as did Ken Anderson as Minister for Supply.
- Died:
  - Laurence Stallings, 73, American playwright, novelist, and photographer
  - Nikolay Voronov, 68, Soviet field marshal and World War II hero

== February 29, 1968 (Thursday) ==
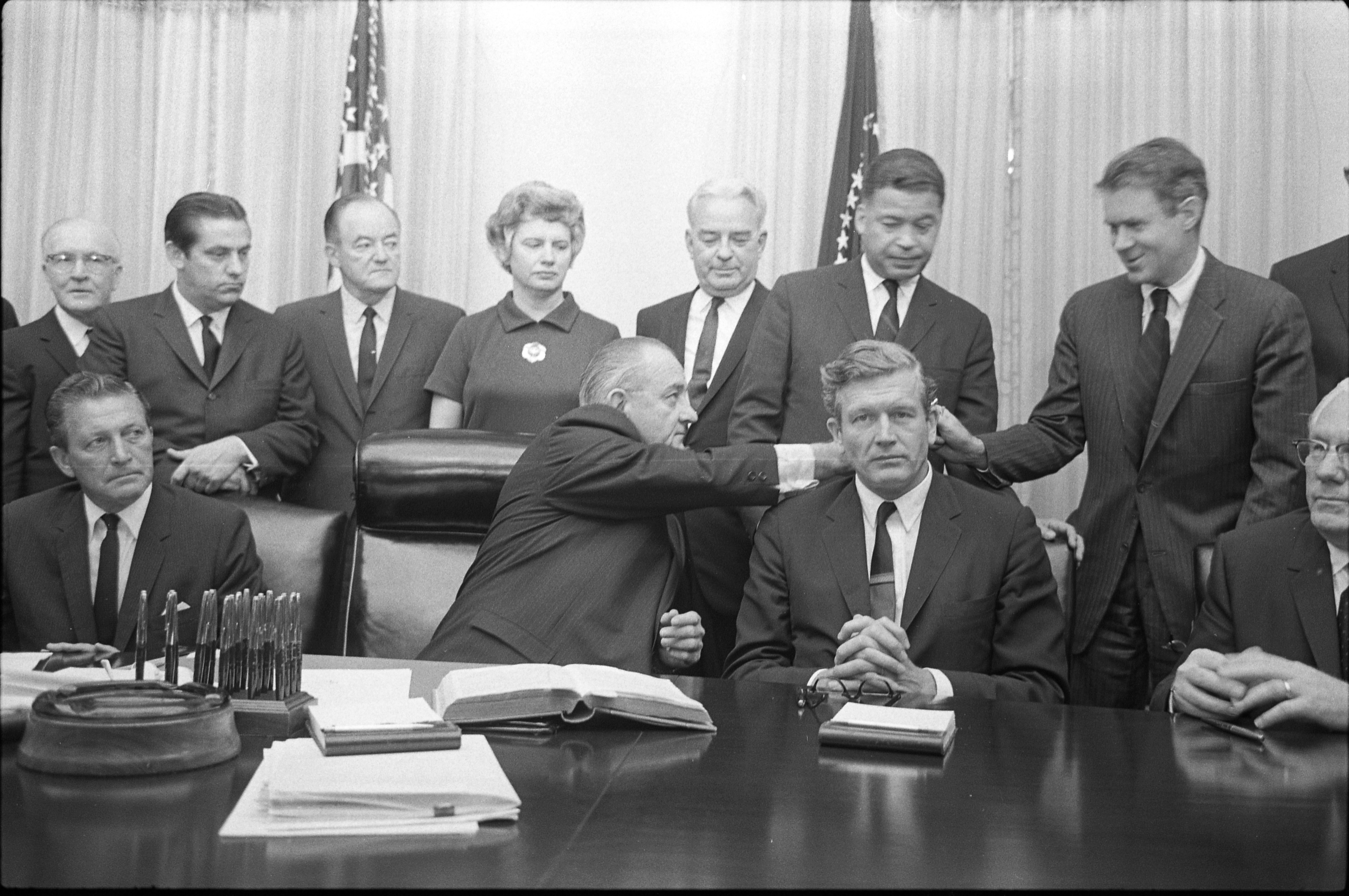
The Kerner Commission

- The Kerner Commission (officially, The National Advisory Commission on Civil Disorders) released its report on the riots of the previous summer and highlighted racial discrimination in the United States as a primary cause. The 426-page report became a national bestseller, with two million copies purchased, and summarized the problem with the ominous warning, "Our nation is moving toward two societies, one black, one white—separate and unequal."
- For the fourth time in the 20th century, a supernova was observed from Earth. The explosion was detected from within the spiral galaxy NGC 6946 at least 22,000,000 years after it had occurred. Swiss astronomer Paul Wild and Canadian astronomer David Dunlap, working independently of each other, both detected the supernova, now designated as SN1968B. Other supernovae had been seen by Earth astronomers in 1917, 1939, and 1948, and more would be observed in later years (1969, 1980, 2002, 2004, 2008 and 2017).
- U.S. President Johnson made an unscheduled appearance at the Pentagon for the farewell ceremony for outgoing Secretary of Defense Robert S. McNamara. Johnson became the first president to be trapped in an elevator when he, the Secretary and 11 other people were caught between the second and third floor when the elevator became stuck. It took another 12 minutes before maintenance men could release them. Johnson joked, "I never knew it took so long to get to the top in the Pentagon", while McNamara said, "This is what's wrong with there being 29 days in February."
- The Brussels Convention of 1968, subtitled "on the mutual recognition of companies and bodies corporate within the EEC", was signed in the Belgian capital by the representatives of the six (European Economic Community) members (France, Italy, West Germany, Belgium, the Netherlands and Luxembourg).
- The 10th Annual Grammy Awards were held in Chicago, Los Angeles, Nashville and New York City. The big winners included The Beatles and George Martin for Sgt. Pepper's Lonely Hearts Club Band, and Johnny Mann for "Up, Up and Away".
- In the continuing reforms of the Prague Spring in Czechoslovakia, the Writers’ Union published the first copy of the magazine Literární listy not to require the approval of government censors.
- A political crisis began in Poland when the Polish Writers' Union voted to condemn encroachments on the right to free speech.
- The Fiscal Year 1969 budget for NASA's Apollo Applications Program (AAP), originally presented as a separate Research and Development program in NASA's FY 1968 budget request in 1967, was substantially cut by the U.S. Congress. As originally conceived, AAP was designed to take full advantage of the United States' investment in Apollo program-developed hardware, facilities, staffing and expertise. However, in making adjustments to considerably lower funding, the program was pared down to the minimum level for maintaining a reasonable human spaceflight program in the early part of the next decade and preserving any basic capability for future U.S. crewed operations in space.
- Died: Tore Ørjasæter, 81, Norwegian poet
