= March 1968 =

Month of 1968

<<	March 1968					>>
Su	Mo	Tu	We	Th	Fr	Sa
					1	2
3	4	5	6	7	8	9
10	11	12	13	14	15	16
17	18	19	20	21	22	23
24	25	26	27	28	29	30
31

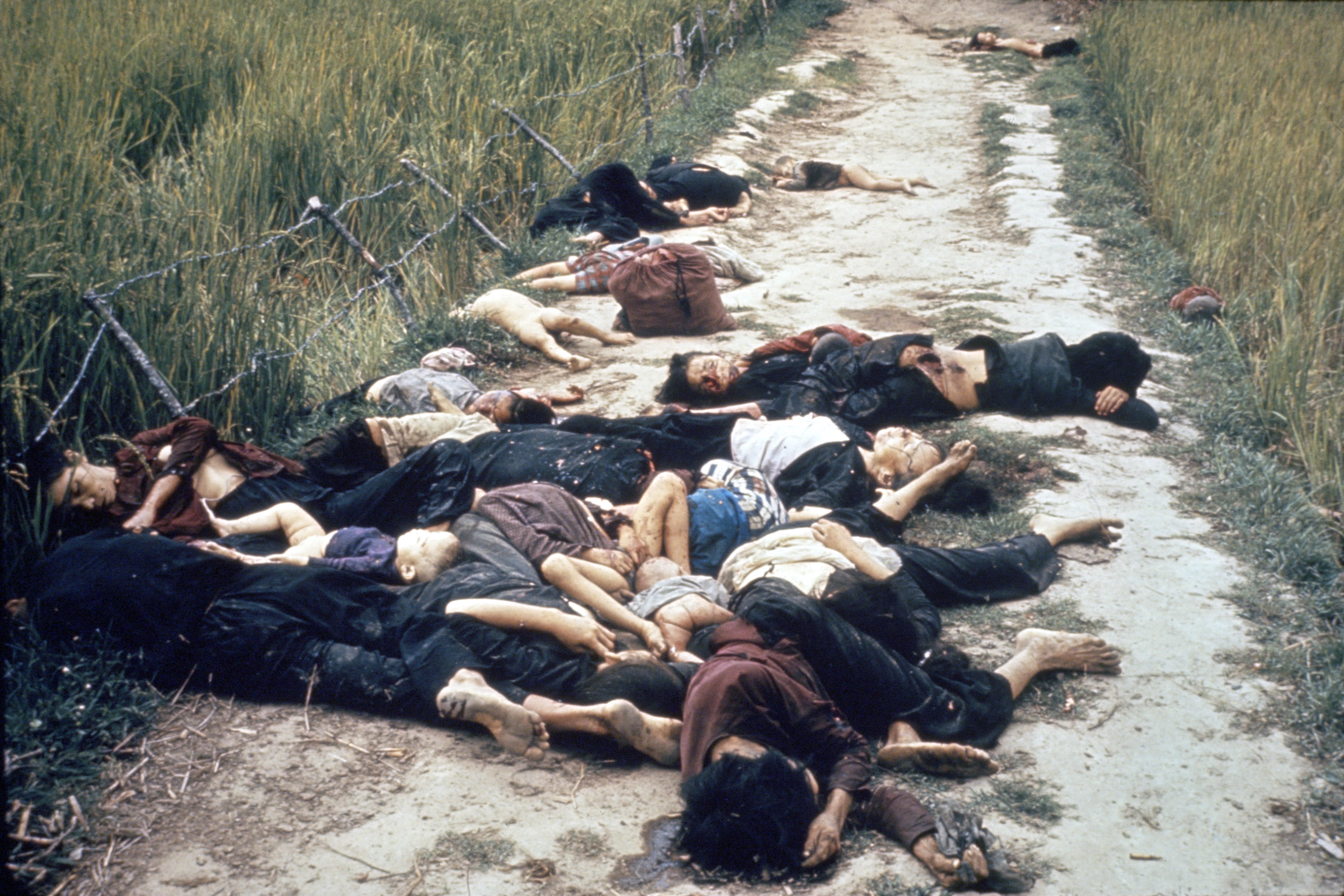
March 16, 1968: U.S. Army soldiers massacre 504 South Vietnamese civilians

March 12, 1968: Mauritius becomes world's newest nation

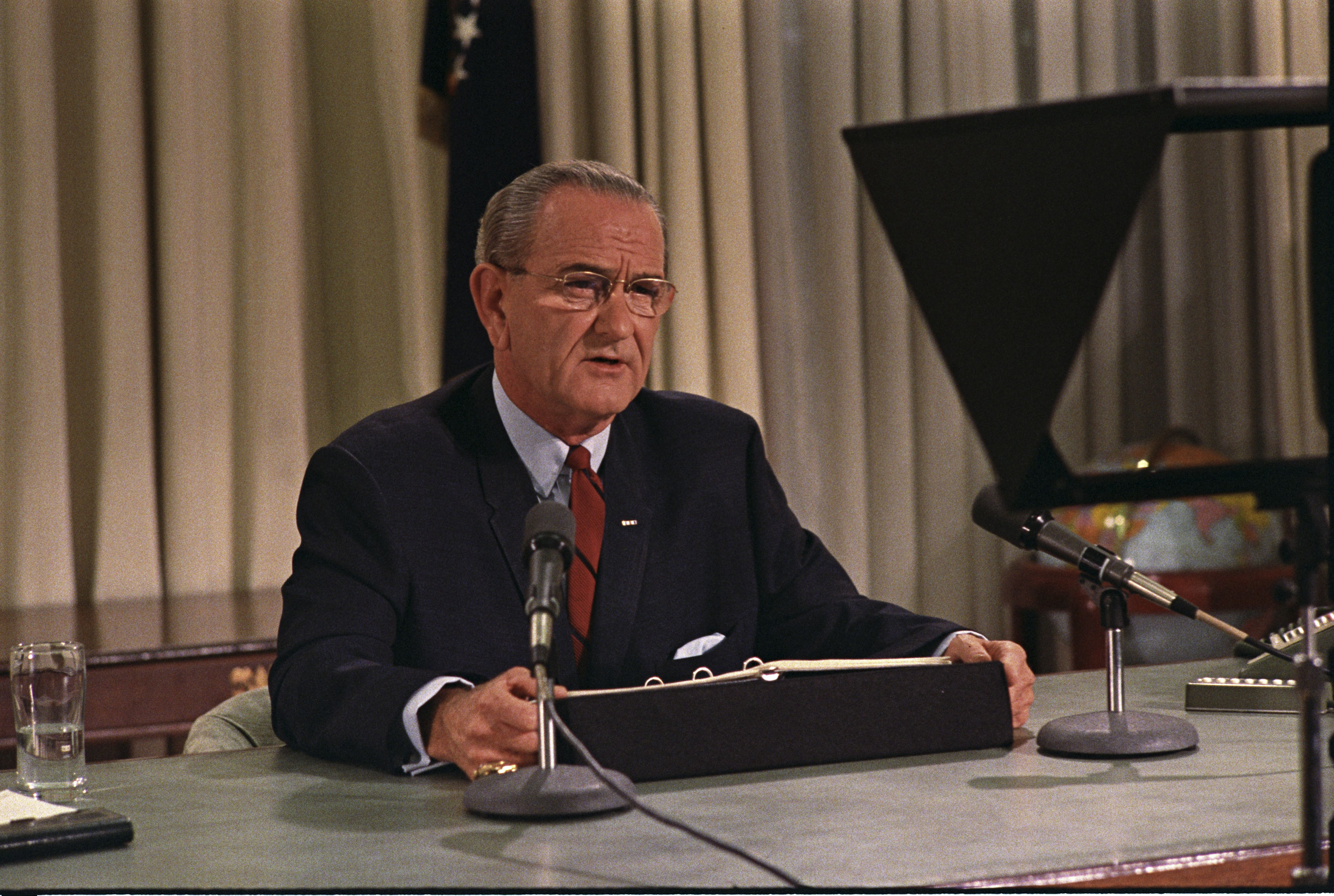
March 31, 1968: U.S. President Johnson announces that he will not run for re-election

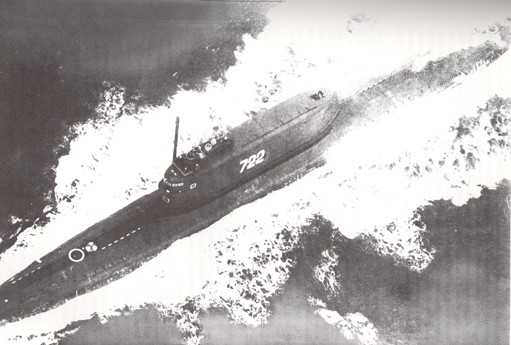
March 8, 1968: Soviet submarine K-129 sank at sea

The following events occurred in March 1968:

== March 1, 1968 (Friday) ==
- Three North Vietnamese fishing trawlers were destroyed by the U.S. Navy and South Vietnamese forces while attempting to resupply the Viet Cong, and a fourth was turned back as part of Operation Market Time. Three of the trawlers were destroyed. A fourth vessel headed back out to sea and, because it got more than 12 miles (19 km) away from the coast and reached international waters, the U.S. Navy was forbidden from firing on the North Vietnamese ship. "American patrol boats were powerless to do anything except to request the flagless, unmarked trawler to identify itself. It refused and continued unscratched." An unidentified navy officer told the UPI, "Sure it's crazy, but it's the rules of the game."
- In what would later be called the "Battle of Valle Giulia", protests became violent at La Sapienza, the 650-year-old university in Rome. Italian students fought with city police outside the university's Faculty of Agriculture building on the Via di Valle Giulia. According to one account, "Students threw stones and incendiary bombs against police armed with nightsticks and hoses", and hundreds of people were injured.
- South Vietnamese troops uncovered a mass grave in the City of Hue containing about 100 bodies. Official sources said the dead all found with their hands tied behind their backs were policemen, civil servants and military men murdered by the invading Viet Cong and North Vietnamese forces. The mayor of Hue reported that the Communists had executed around 300 people during their occupation of the city.
- Operation Coburg, an Australian and New Zealand military action, came to an end. During the six weeks of the operation, the Australians had lost 17 killed and 61 wounded, with allied casualties including two New Zealanders and one American killed, and eight New Zealanders and six Americans wounded.
- The first public performance of an Andrew Lloyd Webber–Tim Rice musical took place when Joseph and the Amazing Technicolor Dreamcoat was staged in its original form as a "pop cantata", by pupils of Colet Court preparatory school in Hammersmith, London, UK.
- Huntington, Indiana, became the second city in the nation (after Haleyville, Alabama) to begin operation of a 9-1-1 emergency call system.
- Country musicians Johnny Cash and June Carter were married in Franklin, Kentucky, with Merle Kilgore as best man.
- Born: Muhō Noelke, West German-born Japanese Zen Buddhist monk; as Jens Olaf Christian Nölke in West Berlin

== March 2, 1968 (Saturday) ==
- The Soviet Union launched the uncrewed Zond 4 mission as a test of its Soyuz 7K-L1 space capsule and the feasibility of a crewed space mission to the Moon. By design, the launch was made "not to fly towards the Moon, but directly opposite" and to travel to a distance of 330,000 kilometres (210,000 mi) from Earth, a bit less than the closest perigee of the Moon of 356,400 kilometres (221,500 mi). After reaching its furthest distance on March 6, Zond 4 returned to Earth on March 9 but had to be destroyed after a failed re-entry.
- The United States made its first field test of its Spartan anti-ballistic missile. The missile was designed to carry a five-megaton W-71 nuclear warhead to intercept incoming missiles and to detonate close enough to neutralize them before they re-entered the atmosphere.
- In front of 97,887 fans at Wembley Stadium, Leeds United defeated Arsenal, 1–0, to win the 1968 Football League Cup Final.
- Born: Daniel Craig, English film actor who portrayed Agent 007 in the James Bond series starting in 2006, succeeding Pierce Brosnan; in Chester
- Died: Frank Erickson, 72, wealthy American bookie who had become a multi-millionaire by conducting gambling operations

== March 3, 1968 (Sunday) ==
- Television Wales and the West (TWW) an independent British TV network known in some areas of Wales as Teledu Cymru, broadcast its last original programming. Following a one-hour variety special called All Good Things..., and a five-minute commercial break, John Betjeman appeared at 11:35 in the evening with a 15-minute commentary titled Come to an End. The next day, Harlech Television would replace TWW and fill its time with a temporary broadcast schedule called "Independent Television Service for Wales and the West", showing reruns of old TWW shows and feeds from ITV. Harlech would finally go on the air with its own network on May 20.
- A group of Asian American stage actors held a press conference in New York City to announce that they would take a stand against the portrayal of Chinese and Japanese characters by Caucasian actors in "yellowface" makeup. That evening, the new organization, Oriental Actors of America, picketed the opening of the Broadway musical Here's Where I Belong at the Billy Rose Theatre; the producers had bypassed Chinese-American actors to cast the role of a Chinese servant character, and awarded the part to a white actor in makeup.
- The Liberian-registered tanker Ocean Eagle, manned by a Greek crew, ran aground at San Juan, Puerto Rico, then broke in two and spilled oil on the beaches in San Juan Harbor. The front section of the Ocean Eagle blocked the channel leading out of the harbor, trapping three U.S. Navy submarines, two American sub tenders and an American destroyer, as well as four Canadian Navy destroyers, along with five freighters.
- In his continuing campaign against Jews in Iraq, Iraqi Prime Minister Tahir Yahya announced a new regulation forbidding Jews from selling their property without government approval. In the nine months since the Six-Day War, Iraqi Jews had been fired from public office and had had their bank accounts frozen, while Jewish students were barred from university educations.
- Born: Brian Leetch, American professional ice hockey defenseman and Hockey Hall of Fame inductee; in Corpus Christi, Texas

== March 4, 1968 (Monday) ==
- Joe Frazier knocked out Buster Mathis in the 11th round to win a share of the vacant world heavyweight boxing title, in the second feature of a "championship doubleheader" at the new Madison Square Garden in New York City; Frazier was recognized as champ by the New York State Athletic Commission (NYSAC), while the World Boxing Association and the World Boxing Council had still not filled the vacancy left after the different groups had stripped Muhammad Ali of his crown. Prior to the Frazier-Mathis bout, world middleweight boxing champion Emile Griffith lost to Italian professional boxer Nino Benvenuti (whom he had dethroned on September 29).
- The film adaptation, by Franco Zeffirelli, of Romeo and Juliet was shown for the first time, as the feature of the annual Royal Film Performance at the Odeon Cinema in London's Leicester Square. Queen Elizabeth II and her husband, Prince Philip, Duke of Edinburgh were in attendance along with their son, Prince Charles. The American press made note of the fact that the silver screen version of William Shakespeare's late 16th Century play included nudity and that the love scene between teenage actors Leonard Whiting and Olivia Hussey "was passed for general exhibition by Britain's board of movie censors which decided it was filmed in impeccable taste."
- The Presidium of the Communist Party of Czechoslovakia voted to dismantle censorship of the press, an unprecedented step in a Communist nation. At the end of the week, newspapers would begin printing demands that President (and former party chief) Antonín Novotný step down. The Central Publications Bureau, that had previously been charged with reviewing material before it was published, was removed from the jurisdiction of Czechoslovakia's Ministry of the Interior and suspended political censorship (although it still retained authority to enforce moral standards).
- Exactly a month before his assassination, Martin Luther King Jr. announced the "Nonviolent Poor People's March on Washington", to take place on Monday, April 22, 1968, and to include impoverished Americans from all races. During the rest of the month, he would work toward preparing the event.
- Born:
  - Kyriakos Mitsotakis, Greek politician, Prime Minister of Greece since 2019; in Athens
  - Giovanni Carrara, Venezuelan Major League Baseball pitcher and inductee to the Venezuelan Baseball Hall of Fame; in El Tigre
  - Patsy Kensit, British film actress and singer; in Lambeth, London
- Died: Einar Sissener, 70, Norwegian stage and film actor and director

== March 5, 1968 (Tuesday) ==
- A "musical chess match" between painter Marcel Duchamp and musical composer John Cage took place at an engineering festival at Ryerson Polytechnical Institute in Toronto. With the title "Reunion", the two men (with help from Duchamp's wife Alexina) "played chess on a board hooked up with sixty-four photoresistors— one per square", with "sonic input" from independent, unrelated compositions by Gordon Mumma, David Tudor, David Behrman, and Lowell Cross, who designed the electronic circuitry. Duchamp quickly defeated Cage as an amused audience watched.
- What would become known as the "East L.A. walkouts" began in large numbers when thousands of Hispanic students walked out of two high schools in East Los Angeles, California. At Garfield High School, which would later become famous in the film Stand and Deliver, "2,700 of the 3,750 predominantly Mexican-American students" walked across the street when classes were dismissed for lunch, and refused to come back inside until the day's end. Hispanic students also walked out of Jefferson High School, where African American students were in the majority.
- All 67 people on board Air France Flight 212 were killed when the Boeing 707 smashed into La Grande Soufrière mountain while making its approach to Pointe-à-Pitre on the island of Guadeloupe. The flight was making its sixth stop on a route that had originated in Santiago de Chile with a final destination of Paris. Almost two years later, another Air France Flight 212 on the same Santiago to Paris route would crash after taking off from Caracas to Pointe-à-Pitre, killing all 62 people on board.
- Born: Gordon Bajnai, Prime Minister of Hungary from 2009 to 2010; in Szeged

== March 6, 1968 (Wednesday) ==
- In an extension of his War on Poverty, U.S. president Lyndon Johnson signed Executive Order 11399 to create the National Council on Indian Opportunity as an aid to the remaining 800,000 American Indians in the United States. In a speech to Congress titled "The Forgotten American", Johnson said, "The American Indian, once proud and free, is torn between white and tribal values; between the politics and language of the white man and his own historic culture. His problems, sharpened by years of defeat and exploitation, neglect and inadequate effort, will take years to overcome."
- The 84th and final episode of Lost in Space, the CBS science fiction series, was aired. The show had premiered on September 15, 1965, with the premise that the Robinson family, their robot, and a stowaway, Dr. Smith, had been launched from Earth on the Jupiter 2 on October 16, 1997. The final episode, "Junkyard in Space", ended with the voyagers still lost in space.
- Twenty-six passengers on a bus in North Sumatra in Indonesia were killed, and 25 more injured, when the buses brakes failed and sent the vehicle into the path of an oncoming train.
- Born: Moira Kelly, American film and television actress; in Queens
- Died: Léon Mathot, 82, French film director

== March 7, 1968 (Thursday) ==
- A drunk, and apparently suicidal, driver killed himself and 19 passengers on a Greyhound bus outside of Baker, California when he drove westward on the Interstate 15 eastbound lanes and caused both his car and the bus to burst into flames. The car driver was Michael Barry, a 39-year old cook who was reportedly "depressed over a divorce and failure to have a song published." The bus, carrying 31 passengers who were on their way to a weekend in Las Vegas, departed Los Angeles at 12:01 in the afternoon and had gotten three miles east of Baker when Barry's car crossed the median from I-15 West and caused the collision at 3:55 p.m. The bodies of the 19 passengers were burned so badly that positive identification would not be completed until almost two weeks later.
- Chemical dispersants were first used successfully in the cleanup of an oil spill after the tanker ship General Colocotronis struck a reef outside the Eleuthera group of islands of the Bahamas and spilled 37,500 barrels (6,000 cubic meters) of heavy fuel oil in the Caribbean Sea. While some oil reached the Bahamian beaches, most was diluted by the spraying of 250 drums of dispersant from a fireboat and from trucks at the beach. After two months, the oil slick had been dispersed and diluted, cleanup was completed and the tanker was salvaged; a study by British marine biologists concluded that there was "no damage to the intertidal marine life following the use of dispersant".
- Representatives of the United States, the Soviet Union and the United Kingdom announced in Geneva that they had agreed to what was described as a "superpower umbrella", described as "a plan to protect nations without nuclear weapons against atomic attack". Under the agreement, the three nuclear superpowers offered joint protection to any nation that ratified what would become the Treaty on the Non-Proliferation of Nuclear Weapons. The U.S., the USSR and UK "pledged immediate assistance for any treaty signator which feels it is being threatened by nuclear attack or becomes the victim of nuclear aggression."
- Newly re-elected, President Makarios of Cyprus lifted restrictions on the island republic's Turkish Cypriot community and removed barricades and roadblocks that had limited the Turkish-speaking minority from crossing outside of their neighborhoods within the Greek Cypriot dominated south.
- Born: Jeff Kent, American major league baseball player and second baseman, and 2000 National League MVP; in Bellflower, California

== March 8, 1968 (Friday) ==
- All 98 crew members of the Soviet ballistic missile submarine K-129 were killed when the Golf II-class sub sank in the North Pacific Ocean, about 90 nautical miles (104 miles or 167 km) southwest of Hawaii. Starting in 1974, the U.S. Central Intelligence Agency would begin attempting to salvage the sunken submarine, using the ship Hughes Glomar Explorer. In 2005, authors Kenneth Sewell and Clint Richmond would advance the theory in their bestselling book, Red Star Rogue: The Untold Story of a Soviet Submarine's Nuclear Strike Attempt on the U.S., that K-129 had actually been trying to launch a nuclear warhead at Hawaii's Pearl Harbor and that the failed launch had caused the submarine's demise.
- A political crisis in Poland was sparked by the first student protests seen in that nation since its Communist takeover. The March 4 expulsion of dissidents Adam Michnik and Henryk Szlajfer from the University of Warsaw was protested in a rally that attracted more than 5,000 students. The peaceful rally was broken up by a state-mobilized "worker squad". After word of the police crackdown spread, protests continued at Warsaw for three weeks and spread to the campuses of the state universities in Kraków, Poznań, Lublin, Wrocław and other cities.
- The term green revolution was coined in a speech by William S. Gaud, Administrator of the United States Agency for International Development (USAID), to describe the increase in world agricultural production with the use of new technologies.
- Twenty-two people, most of them students, were killed near the city of Afyonkarahisar in Turkey, when the bus they were riding in skidded on a slippery highway and fell into a 600-foot (180 m) deep ravine.
- Rock music promoter Bill Graham opened Fillmore East, a New York City counterpart to the San Francisco theater named The Fillmore.

== March 9, 1968 (Saturday) ==
- The Soviet Union's uncrewed Zond 4 rocket re-entered Earth's atmosphere after a flight to gather data for a possible Soviet crewed mission to the Moon, after returning at a velocity similar to what would be encountered in an actual return from a lunar trip. Plans for the probe to land in the Soviet Union, after a decelerating "skip into the atmosphere", failed. The Zond 4's self-destruction system had to be activated as it made a ballistic re-entry, and the probe was destroyed at an altitude of 15 kilometres (9.3 miles) over the Gulf of Guinea, less than 200 kilometres (120 miles) off of the coast of West Africa.

== March 10, 1968 (Sunday) ==
- Jacek Kuroń, a former professor at the University of Warsaw and former Communist Party member, was among the many people arrested for participating in student demonstrations. He would spend two and a half years in prison on charges of inciting riots, and would be arrested several more times over the years, but would later serve as Poland's Minister of Labor and Social Policy after the fall of Communism.
- The town of Acme, Wyoming, located in Sheridan County, with a population of about 100, was sold to a group of Chicago investors. The town had been founded in 1910 by the Acme Coal Company, and sold for $100,000 to a Chicago group after its previous owners, Mr. and Mrs. Merton Bond, ran ads in newspapers across the nation.
- Signed by President Ho Chi Minh four months earlier, a decree took effect in North Vietnam outlawing local opposition to the nation's conduct of the Vietnam War. A long list of "counterrevolutionary" crimes was subject to punishments ranging from brief detention, to life in prison or the death penalty.
- Died:
  - Donogh O'Malley, 47, Ireland's Minister for Education, collapsed while speaking at an election rally in Limerick, where he had been campaigning for re-election to the Irish Parliament.
  - Helen Walker, 47, American film actress, died from cancer.

== March 11, 1968 (Monday) ==
- Lucille Ball ended her second situation comedy series, The Lucy Show, with her 144th and last original episode as "Mrs. Carmichael" and Gale Gordon as "Mr. Mooney". A month later, Ms. Ball would announce her return in a new series in the autumn with a new character, "Lucy Carter", Gordon as her brother-in-law, Harry Carter, and Ball's own son and daughter, Desi Arnaz Jr. and Lucie Arnaz as her TV children, "Craig" and "Kim". The Carmichael children on The Lucy Show (Candy Moore as "Chris" and Jimmy Garrett as "Jerry") had not been seen since 1965.
- North Vietnamese Army troops overran a secret American radar station located on Pho Pha Thi, a 5,500 foot high mountain inside Laos that was high above the North Vietnamese frontier. Most of the sensitive electronic equipment was believed to have been taken by the Soviet Union, and 11 United States Air Force technicians disappeared. At the time, Laos was a neutral kingdom and American involvement in the Laotian Civil War remained a secret.
- U.S. president Lyndon B. Johnson mandated that all computers purchased by the federal government needed to support ASCII character encoding. One historian would observe later that "Johnson was simply institutionalizing what was already the case: from its first implementation in 1963, ASCII was and is the standard for encoding data.
- After one year of being the acting president of Indonesia, General Suharto was elected by the People's Consultative Assembly to a full five-year term as president. Suharto would be elected six more times and rule for another thirty years before being forced to resign on May 20, 1998, in the wake of a popular uprising.
- A landslide in the Democratic Republic of the Congo buried 260 people alive in the remote village of Kazipa, described as being located 15 miles (24 km) south of Bukavu.
- Italy's president Giuseppe Saragat ordered the dissolution of parliament and the government of Prime Minister Aldo Moro, and ordered new elections for May 19.
- Born: Lisa Loeb, American singer; in Bethesda, Maryland

== March 12, 1968 (Tuesday) ==
- Mauritius was granted independence from British rule shortly after midnight, at a flag-raising ceremony in Port Louis, the capital of the small Indian Ocean island. Because of the threat of violence between the Muslim majority and the Creole minority that opposed independence, the royal representative and a cousin of Queen Elizabeth, Princess Alexandra, canceled her plans to preside. Appearing in her place was Anthony Greenwood, Britain's Ministry of Housing and Local Government. Sir Seewoosagur Ramgoolam, who had been chief minister in colonial times, became the independent nation's first prime minister. Colonial Governor John Rennie became the first governor-general. Ramgoolam would serve as prime minister until 1982, and would later serve as governor-general from 1983 until his death in 1985. Mauritius would become a republic in 1992 on the 24th anniversary of its independence.
- U.S. president Lyndon B. Johnson barely edged out antiwar candidate Eugene McCarthy in the New Hampshire Democratic primary, the opening event in nominations for the 1968 U.S. presidential election. The vote highlighted deep divisions in the country, and the party, over Vietnam, and would demonstrate President Johnson's increasing unpopularity. Johnson received 49.6% of the votes cast, but U.S. Senator McCarthy of Minnesota— who had campaigned on a platform of ending U.S. involvement in Vietnam— got 41.9% despite being relatively unknown outside of his home state. The result, "which demonstrated that Johnson was vulnerable" to being defeated for re-election, would prompt other candidates to challenge the President.
- Born:
  - Aaron Eckhart, American film actor known for portraying a fictional U.S. president in Olympus Has Fallen and its sequels; in Cupertino, California
  - Jason Lively, American film actor known for European Vacation; in Carrollton, Georgia

== March 13, 1968 (Wednesday) ==
- The release of nerve gas by the U.S. Army killed thousands of sheep on a farm 27 miles away from the Army's Dugway Proving Ground in Utah. An F-4 aircraft had sprayed 320 gallons of the nerve agent VX in a target deep within the restricted proving ground, then released the emptied tanks. Two days later, ranchers in Skull Valley in Tooele County, Utah, began reporting that their herds of sheep had become ill, with 6,400 of the animals becoming seriously ill. Those that did not die from the gas exposure would be euthanized. Initially, the Army denied that it had conducted any outdoor nerve gas tests in more than a year. On March 21, however, the Army Testing Command would acknowledge the test in a letter to U.S. Senator Frank E. Moss of Utah, and "an aide to the Senator... ignored or was unaware of the fact that the Pentagon regarded the letter as private and released it to the press." No human beings were affected by the VX contamination, but the U.S. Army would admit its negligence and pay $376,000 to compensate farmers for their lost livestock, and another $198,000 for the damage to their grazing lands.
- The world's first Rotaract club was chartered, in the United States, in Charlotte, North Carolina. A youth auxiliary to the Rotary Club service organization, sponsored by Rotary International, Rotaract originally got its name from a portmanteau of the words "Rotary" and "interact". In its 50th year (2017), there would be 9,522 Rotaract clubs in 177 nations and 291,006 members.
- The Record Plant recording studio, founded by audio engineer Gary Kellgren and entrepreneur Chris Stone, opened in New York City with innovative sound recording and mixing techniques. The first album cut by the new studio would be Jimi Hendrix's Electric Ladyland.
- U.S. President Johnson made the decision to deploy an additional 30,000 American troops to South Vietnam, but would rescind the order in the wake of the results of the New Hampshire Primary. By month's end, he would revise the deployment to 13,500 troops.
- Born: Masami Okui, Japanese pop music singer; in Itami, Hyōgo prefecture

== March 14, 1968 (Thursday) ==
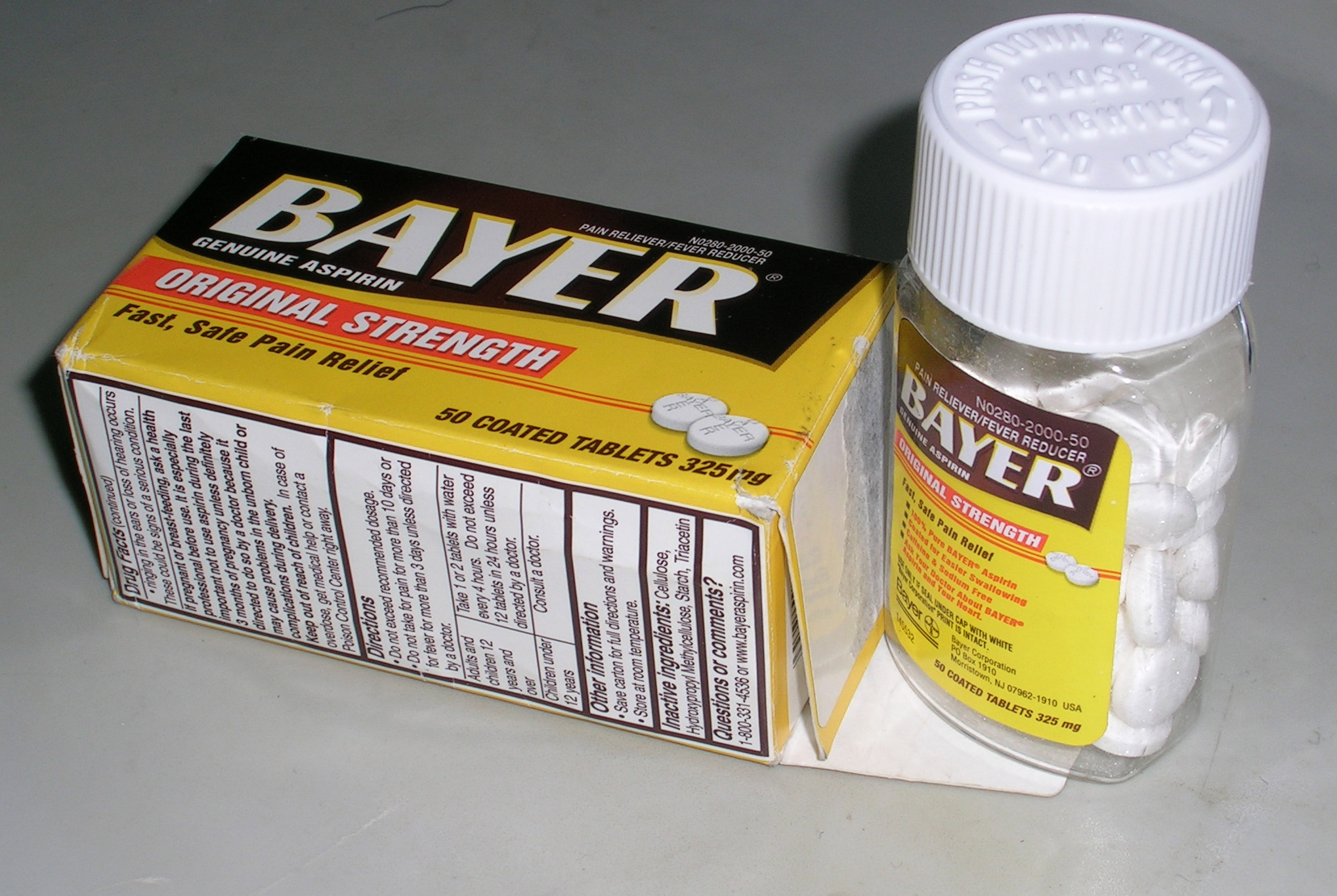
Child-proof cap

- The nationwide introduction of the "child-proof cap" for medicines in the United States was announced at a news conference in Chicago, three days before the start of National Poison Prevention Week. The new type of container had been developed in Canada and had been tested in Tacoma, Washington during 1967, where local pediatricians had determined that their patients couldn't open the bottle unless they knew to push down on the cap before it could be turned. The Journal of the American Pediatrics Society reported in its most recent journal that the number of children treated for serious poisoning at one Tacoma hospital over a six-month period had decreased from 50 to only three.
- As the United States sought to maintain the price of $35.20 per ounce for gold to maintain the value of the British pound by selling gold reserves to the United Kingdom, unprecedented purchases were made on the international gold selling markets; $400,000,000 worth of gold was sold in a single day on the London Gold Exchange. The United States requested that trading on the London Gold Market be suspended, and the market was temporarily closed the next day. The London Gold Pool would be closed permanently three days later.
- The Southern Christian Leadership Conference, which had successfully advanced African-American civil rights under the leadership of Martin Luther King Jr., moved into the cause of fighting for the rights of impoverished Americans of all races. Dr. King convened a meeting in Atlanta that brought together over 70 "representatives of black, white, Chicano, Puerto Rican, and American Indian groups" to discuss the strategy for combating poverty.
- ABC aired the final original episode of its Batman television series with Adam West and Burt Ward. The final guest villain was Zsa Zsa Gabor as "Minerva" in a 30-minute episode titled "Minerva, Mayhem and Millionaires".
- The Czechoslovak Communist Party's Politburo voted to institute a process of political rehabilitation for party members who had been purged from their jobs during the 1950s.
- Born:
  - Megan Follows, Canadian-born American television actress known for being the star of the Canadian Anne of Green Gables film series, and as the co-star of American TV series Reign; in Toronto
  - James Frain, English film and television actor; in Leeds, West Riding of Yorkshire
- Died:
  - Ada Gobetti, 65, Italian journalist and anti-Fascist activist
  - Erwin Panofsky, 75, German Jewish art historian
  - Josef Harpe, 80, German Wehrmacht General

== March 15, 1968 (Friday) ==
- Britain's chancellor of the exchequer, Roy Jenkins, announced at 1:00 in the morning that "The London Gold Market will be closed today, Friday, March 15. This is at the request of the United States Government. At a meeting of the Privy Council held this morning at Buckingham Palace, Her Majesty the Queen approved a proclamation appointing Friday, 15th March, to be observed as a Bank Holiday throughout the United Kingdom. The banks are, however, being asked to provide their domestic customers with normal cash requirements in sterling. The authorities are requesting that the stock exchanges also be closed." Britain's Foreign Secretary George Brown could not be located in time for the meeting to discuss this, because he was apparently drunk. Brown resigned from the Cabinet and was succeeded by First Secretary of State Michael Stewart.
- Dr. Philip Blaiberg of South Africa became the first person to go home after a heart transplant, walking out of the Groote Schuur Hospital in Cape Town to a waiting car. Blaiberg, who had received the heart on January 2, would survive for another 17 months before dying on August 17, 1969.
- India's prime minister Indira Gandhi announced that her nation would not sign the Nuclear Non-Proliferation Treaty. India would continue to work on its atomic weapons program and would detonate its first atomic bomb on May 18, 1974.
- Twenty-six people were killed and 30 injured near outside of Madrid when an express train collided with a freight car carrying a cargo of steel tracks, near Santa María de la Alameda.
- Born: Mark McGrath, American rock singer and co-founder of the band Sugar Ray; in Hartford, Connecticut
- Died: Khuang Aphaiwong, 65, three-time Prime Minister of Thailand during the 1940s

== March 16, 1968 (Saturday) ==
- The My Lai massacre took place as Company C of the First Battalion of the U.S. Army's 20th Infantry Regiment killed 109 women, children and elderly men and raped women and children in Xom Lang, a small portion of the Son My village, and which U.S. military maps had identified as "My Lai (4)", within South Vietnam's Quảng Nam province. Other estimates given are "between 347 and 504 Vietnamese civilians were killed". The Army would cover up the incident as a military victory for more than a year until a helicopter pilot who had seen the aftermath, Ronald Ridenhour, was told about the massacre at "Pinkville" by other members of Company C. After confirming the story with other company members, Ridenour, in turn, would notify his Arizona congressman, Morris K. Udall, the following March, and 26 soldiers would be brought up on charges in September. Investigative reporter Seymour M. Hersh would break the story in the newspapers of November 13, 1969. U.S. Army 2nd Lieutenant William Calley, who gave the order to fire, was court-martialed along with 11 other soldiers. Only Calley would be convicted. Initially sentenced to life imprisonment, he would be paroled in 1974. Public outrage over the massacre would further undermine public support for the U.S. efforts in Vietnam.
- Seventeen people were killed by a fire caused when the American freighter African Star collided with Intercity No. 11, an oil barge being towed by the tugboat Midwest Cities, on the Mississippi River in Louisiana. The African Star, a refrigerated ship, was nearing Pointe à la Hache, Louisiana when the collision occurred.
- U.S. senator Robert F. Kennedy of New York, former U.S. attorney general and the younger brother of the late President John F. Kennedy, entered the race for the Democratic Party presidential nomination and announced that he would challenge U.S. president Johnson at the August 26 national convention.
- The 1968 NCAA Division I Men's Ice Hockey Tournament was won by the University of Denver Pioneers for the fourth time, defeating the University of North Dakota Fighting Hawks, 4 to 0, at the tournament finals in Duluth, Minnesota.
- A constitutional referendum in Greece approved a new constitution prepared by the ruling military junta.
- Died:
  - June Collyer, 61, American film actress, died from bronchial pneumonia
  - Mario Castelnuovo-Tedesco, 72, Italian guitarist and composer

== March 17, 1968 (Sunday) ==
- A head-on collision between two buses in Turkey killed 35 people and injured 45 more. The two buses had both been traveling the highway between Istanbul and Edirne. The bus accident was one of four that day with a high fatality rate. In Nigeria, 19 people were killed and 12 injured when a bus collided with an oil truck 75 miles north of Lagos, while in Lazarevac, a suburb of the Yugoslavian capital of Belgrade, 10 people were killed and 30 injured when their bus overturned, while nine other people drowned south of Belgrade near Kraljevo when their bus hit a tree and toppled into the Ibar River.
- The London Gold Pool, which had been established by the central banks of the United States and eight Western European nations in 1961, was disbanded after the loss of control over purchases of gold reserves.
- A demonstration in London's Grosvenor Square, against American involvement in the Vietnam War turned violent; 91 people were injured and 200 demonstrators were arrested.

== March 18, 1968 (Monday) ==
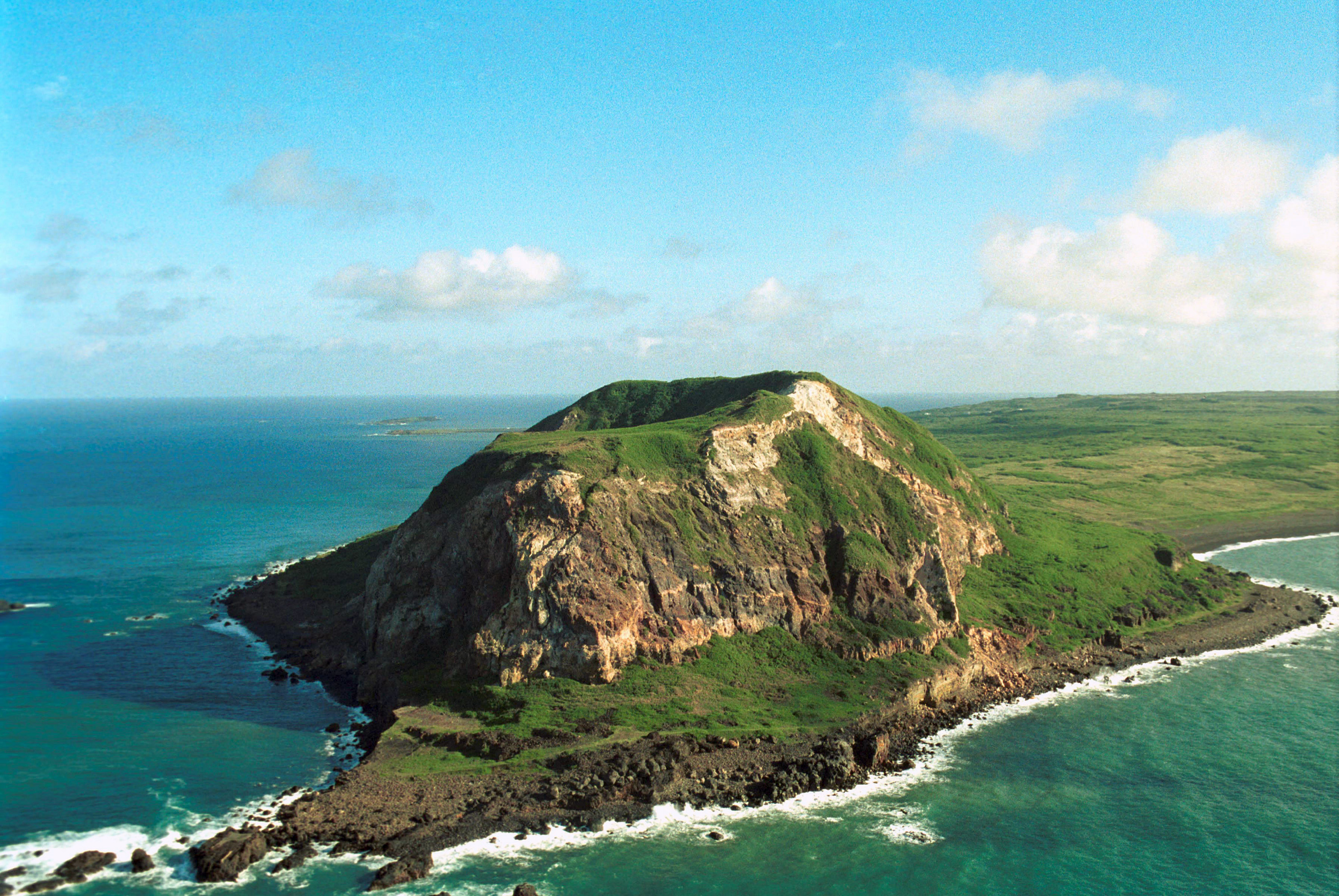
Mount Suribachi on Iwo Jima in 2001

- In a ceremony that was not reported until a week after it happened, the American flag was lowered at Japan's Iwo Jima after 23 years. A group of about 50 American servicemen climbed to Mount Suribachi, where a U.S. flag had flown since February 23, 1945, during the bloody Battle of Iwo Jima, and "Suribachi was one of the few places in the world where the American flag flew 24 hours a day instead of from dawn to sunset". The lowering came as the United States prepared to return Iwo Jima and the neighboring Bonin islands before year's end. After the old flagpole was removed, a copper replica of the U.S. flag was placed at the Iwo Jima Memorial.
- The Philippine Army summarily executed 28 Moro Muslim soldiers who had mutinied after not being properly paid by the Army while training. While there is a dispute as to the circumstances of the execution, including whether it actually happened, news of the event would be "an important factor giving rise to the founding of the Muslim Independence Movement" with the Muslim minority seeking autonomy or independence in the southern Philippine islands in Mindanao and the Sulu Archipelago.
- Two adults were killed, and 28 high school students from the Herzliya Hebrew Gymnasium were wounded when an Israeli school bus was blasted by a Palestinian fedayeen land mine that had been planted in the road near Israel's border with Jordan. The bus had been making a field trip from Tel Aviv to the Negev Desert and struck the mine near Be'er Ora, 12 miles north of Eilat. Israeli Defense Forces would retaliate with an attack on the Jordanian village of Karameh.
- Mel Brooks's classic satirical film, The Producers, premiered in the United States after its debut screening in Pittsburgh on November 22, 1967. The film would win the Academy Award for Best Original Screenplay and would later be ranked eleventh on the AFI's 100 Years...100 Laughs list.
- The United States departed from the gold standard by eliminating the mandate that U.S. currency deposits be backed by the U.S. gold reserve at the rate of 25 cents per dollar, and eliminated the requirement for backing notes.
- The U.S. Department of Health, Education and Welfare issued nationwide guidelines to prevent racial discrimination, "applying the racial rules for the first time to the entire nation rather than to the South alone".

== March 19, 1968 (Tuesday) ==
- In response to the student protests at Warsaw, the First Secretary of the Polish United Workers' Party, Wladyslaw Gomulka, blamed the uprising on "Zionist revisionists" and told his fellow Communists that there were three types of Polish Jews—the "patriotic Jews" who were loyal to the government; Zionists who wanted to undermine the state; and "cosmopolitans" who were neither Jews nor Poles" and who tended to avoid any line of work toward building the socialist fatherland. When the complete text of the speech was published in the Soviet Union, Gomulka's demand that Zionist Jews be encouraged to leave Poland had the "unplanned effect of reinforcing the hopes of many Soviet Jews eager to emigrate to Israel or the West."
- Student protests began at Howard University in Washington, D.C., and were marked by "the first building takeover on a college campus", signaling a new era of militant student activism on American college campuses. For five days, students staged a sit-in of the administration building, temporarily shutting down the historically black university. The impetus for the demonstration was the punishment of 37 students who had disrupted the university's Charter Day celebration on March 1. Additional causes protested were the school's ROTC program and military recruitment; the disproportionate number of African-Americans being sent into combat in the Vietnam War; and the lack of curriculum of African-American studies.
- During the Orbital Workshop (OWS) preliminary design review, it was suggested that the Apollo Applications Program (AAP) vehicles contain a library of material of an operational, technical, and recreational nature for use by the flight crews. Loewy and Snaith, Inc., had made a similar suggestion. A survey of AAP crew members was being conducted to determine the type and quantity of such materials the crews might desire so that design engineers could arrive at a preliminary systems approach to an inflight library and evaluate the impact.
- The United Kingdom's chancellor of the exchequer, Roy Jenkins, announced a 10% increase in taxes in the form of higher surcharges on alcohol, tobacco, gasoline and oil, and gambling, as well as a long list of consumer goods. The move was made to add £774 million ($2.2 billion) to the budget. The basic British income tax rate of 41.25%, however, remained the same.
- Crown Prince Harald of Norway, who would become King Harald V in 1991, broke centuries of tradition by announcing his engagement, outside of royalty, to a commoner, Sonja Haraldsen.
- Died: Gladys Osborne Leonard, 85, British psychic and trance medium

== March 20, 1968 (Wednesday) ==
- At 1:40 in the morning, an American subversive group toppled a Pacific Gas and Electric Company (PG&E) electrical tower with dynamite charges outside of Berkeley, California. The destruction of the tower brought down two 115,000 volt transmission lines, cutting off power to the University of California and to the Lawrence Radiation Laboratory. Power at the radiation laboratory was quickly fixed by emergency backup generators, and the PG&E utility restored partial service to the university by 8:00 in the morning. Two days later, the aerial cable of Pacific Bell was brought down in Contra Costa County, disrupting phone service in Berkeley and Oakland.
- Died: Carl Theodor Dreyer, 79, Danish film director

== March 21, 1968 (Thursday) ==
- The Battle of Karameh took place in the town of Karameh in Jordan, as the Israel Defense Forces forces and tanks crossed the border with 15,000 troops to move against the headquarters of the Palestine Liberation Organization, where a smaller force defended the PLO guerrillas. "Although hopelessly outnumbered and outgunned by Israeli forces", an author would later note, "the Palestinians stood and fought valiantly", and King Hussein ordered the Jordanian Army, with tanks and artillery, to come to their aid. Ten hours later, IDF retreated back across the border, but not before 28 of its members had been killed and 90 wounded. The Palestinians had more than ten times the number of casualties, but the legend of their defense against superior numbers would lead to more Palestinians joining the fight against Israel.
- Governor Nelson Rockefeller of New York surprised supporters who had been expecting him to challenge former vice president Richard Nixon for the Republican Party nomination for president. "Quite frankly", Rockefeller said, "I want it clear at this time that the majority of party leaders want the candidacy of Richard Nixon at this time. It would therefore be illogical and unreasonable that I would try to arouse their support.
- Australia's ban on the Kama Sutra was lifted by order of Senator Malcolm Scott, the Minister for Customs, who announced his decision to take Vātsyāyana's classic 2nd century book, known for its descriptions of "the art of making love", off of the federal list of banned books.
- Died:
  - Gerhart Eisler, 71, East German politician and former U.S. resident who was described in 1946 as "the No. 1 Communist spy in the United States". After fleeing the U.S. in 1949, Eisler became a member of East Germany's Communist Party and was Chairman of the State Radio Committee.
  - John Turner, 111, English supercentenarian recognized since 1966 as the oldest living person

== March 22, 1968 (Friday) ==
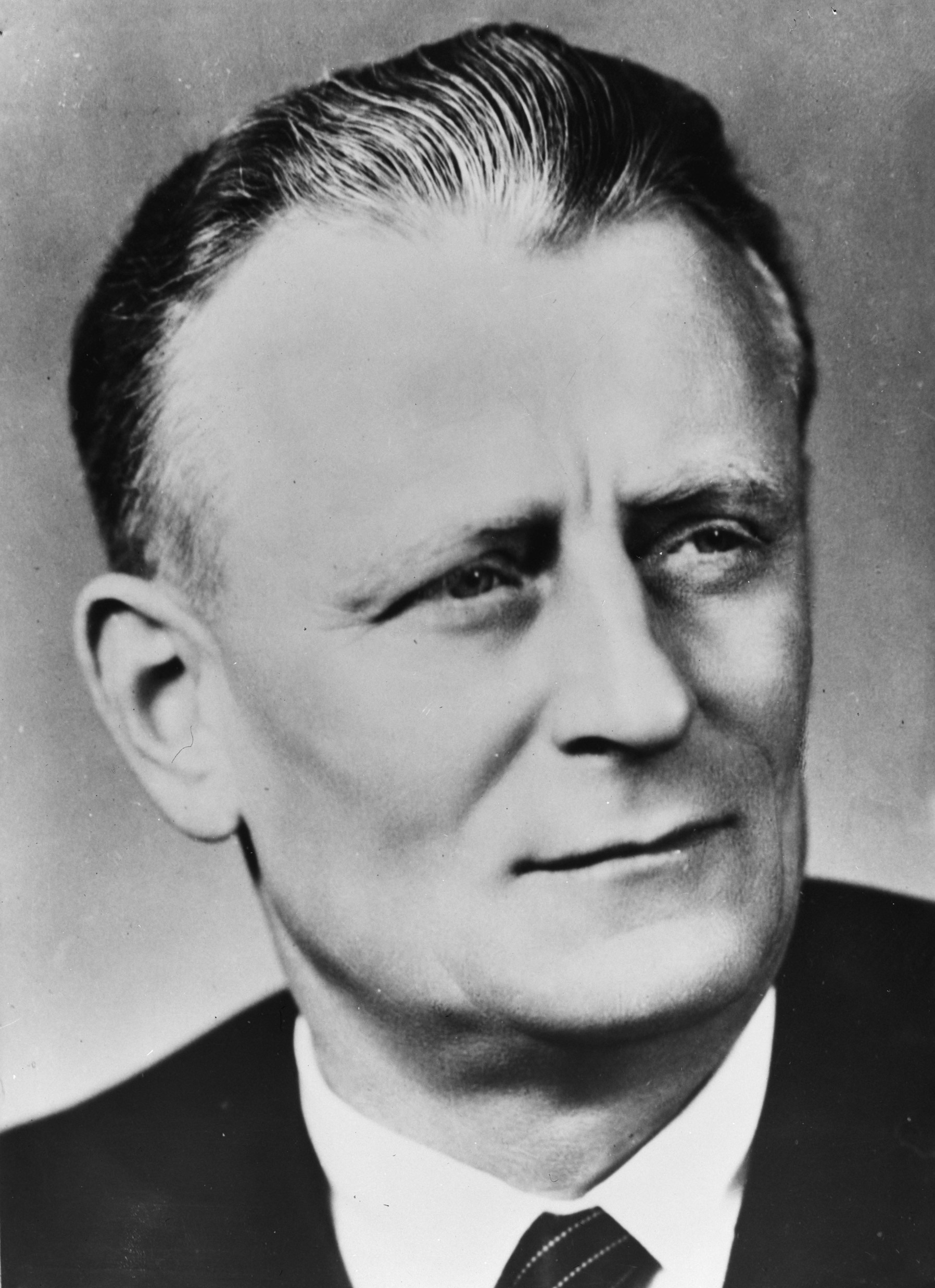
Ex-President Novotný

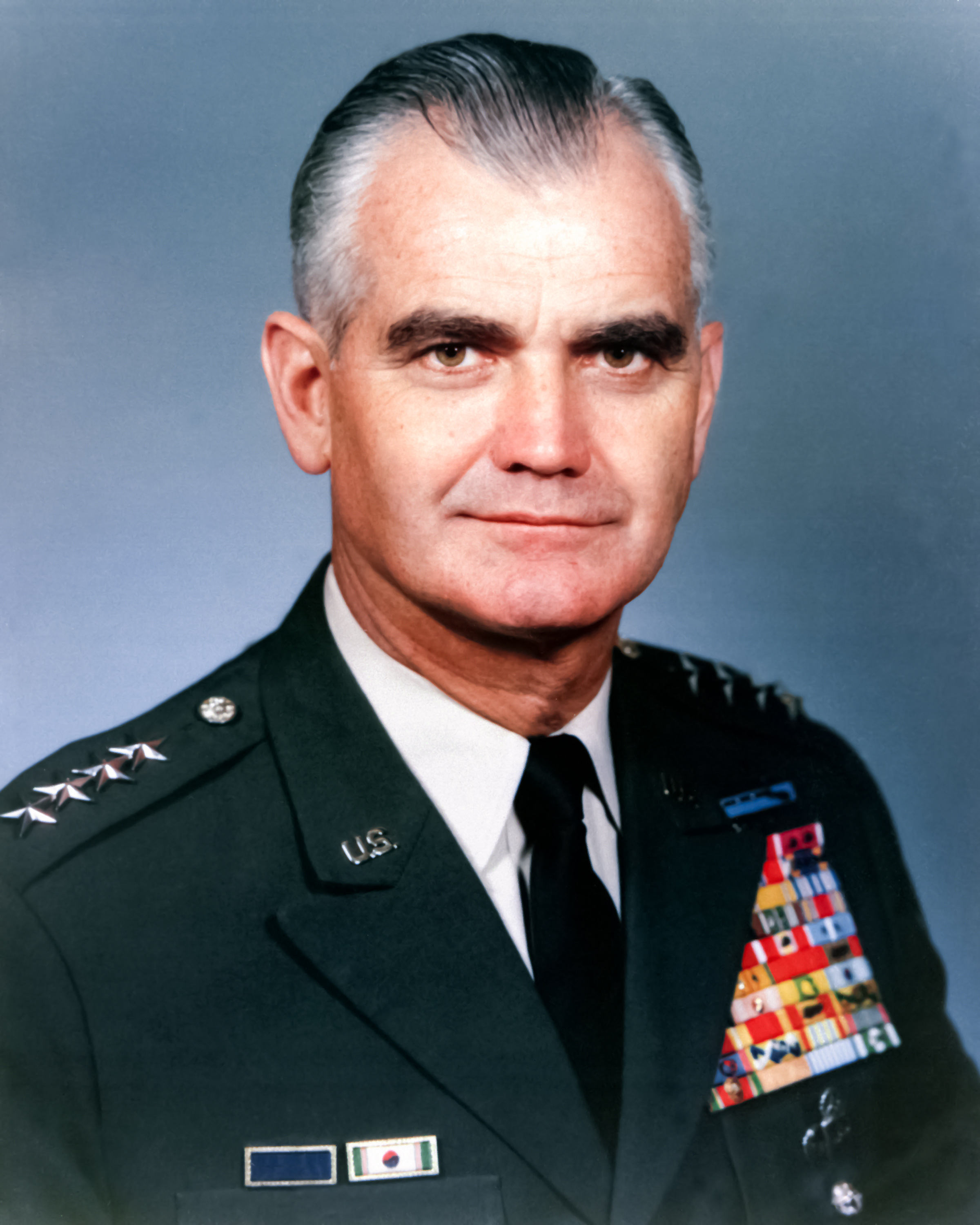
Ex-Vietnam forces commander Westmoreland

- On the first day of spring, Antonín Novotný resigned, under pressure, from his remaining job as President of Czechoslovakia in the wake of a scandal from the defection of General Jan Sejna. A reporter at the time noted that Novotny's resignation "was the first time a Communist leader has been removed by public pressure." Two months earlier, Novotný had been replaced in the more powerful job of General Secretary of the Czechoslovak Communist Party by Alexander Dubček. Czechoslovakia's National Assembly voted, 282 to 6, to name Ludvík Svoboda as the new president, causing alarm in the other Communist nations of Eastern Europe and would "mark the beginning of the Prague Spring, a period of high hopes that ran into the summer, underscored by Dubček's pledge: 'There is only one path and that is forward.'"
- Daniel Cohn-Bendit, who would soon be nicknamed "Danny the Red", and 150 other students occupied the eighth-floor faculty lounge in the administration building at University of Paris X Nanterre, commonly referred to as the university of Nanterre. The action, originally set to protest the arrest of six Nanterre students who had been protesting the Vietnam War, would set in motion a chain of events that would lead France to the brink of revolution in May. After the publication of their demands, the students left the building without any trouble, but the incident would become known as the "Movement of 22 March".
- U.S. Army General William C. Westmoreland, who had guided the military operations in the Vietnam War since 1964, was recalled by President Johnson, effective July 2. General Westmoreland was reassigned to the Joint Chiefs of Staff as Johnson changed American conduct of the war.
- Born:
  - Javier Castillejo, Spanish boxer recognized as the WBC light-middleweight champion from 1999 to 2001, and WBA middleweight champion from 2006 to 2007; in Madrid
  - Euronymous (stage name for Øystein Aarseth), Norwegian heavy metal guitarist and co-founder of the black metal band Mayhem; in Egersund (murdered, 1993)

== March 23, 1968 (Saturday) ==
- Leaders of the Communist Party organizations of six of the members of the Warsaw Pact (the Soviet Union, Poland, East Germany, Bulgaria, Hungary and Czechoslovakia) met at a hastily called meeting in East Germany at Dresden to discuss the dramatic reforms that were taking place in Czechoslovakia. The meeting was attended, without notice, by several generals from the Soviet Union's Red Army. Dubcek of Czechoslovakia was heavily criticized by the other leaders, starting with his counterpart from Poland, Wladyslaw Gomulka. However, no plan for suppressing the reforms was recommended at the meeting, and Dubcek would report later that the other states pledged to maintain their policy of "non-interference in internal affairs."
- The UCLA Bruins defeated the University of North Carolina Tar Heels, 78 to 55, to win the NCAA basketball championship. The 23-point victory was the largest in NCAA finals history up to that time.
- Born:
  - Michael Atherton, English cricketer and captain of the England cricket team, 1993 to 1998; in Failsworth, Lancashire
  - Damon Albarn, English singer-songwriter and lead singer of Blur and Gorillaz; in Whitechapel, London
- Died: Edwin O'Connor, 49, American novelist and Pulitzer Prize for Fiction winner, died from a cerebral hemorrhage

== March 24, 1968 (Sunday) ==
- Marco Aurelio Robles was removed from office as President of Panama after that nation's National Assembly voted, 29 to 0, to convict him on articles of impeachment following a ten-day trial. Another 12 deputies who were supporters of Robles had boycotted the trial. First Vice President Max Delvalle was then administered the oath of office, but Robles refused to accept the legislative decision. General Bolívar Vallarino, commander of the Panamanian National Guard, announced that it would keep Robles in office. The Guard invaded the opposition party headquarters after midnight and began making arrests, then barred the deputies from entering the legislative building. On April 5, Panama's Supreme Court ruled, 8 to 2, that Robles had been deprived of his right to a fair trial, and that Robles was legally the president.
- The first stage of voting began in parliamentary elections in Lebanon, to continue for two weeks ending on April 7. Under the Constitution of Lebanon, the 99 seats were apportioned with a reservation of a specific number of seats for members of Lebanon's Christian and Muslim denominations. Branches of Christianity (Maronite, Greek Orthodox, Melkite Greek Catholic, Armenian Orthodox, Armenian Catholic and Protestant) were reserved 53 seats, and branches of Islam (Sunni, Shi'ite, and Druze) had 45 seats, with the 99th reserved as "independent".
- The United Nations Security Council approved its Resolution 248, condemning Israel's attack on the Jordanian village of Karameh. The resolution also condemned "All violent incidents and other violations of the ceasefire". This paragraph was added to the resolution to appease four nations on the UN Security Council (the United Kingdom, the United States, the Republic of China (Taiwan) and Canada, who, on March 21, had voiced concerns regarding terrorist attacks on Israel that had preceded the Israeli retaliation at Karameh.
- All 61 passengers and crew on Aer Lingus Flight 712 were killed when the plane crashed into the sea near Tuskar Rock in Ireland while flying from Cork to London. The pilot sent one last message to air traffic control in London, "Twelve thousand feet, spinning rapidly".
- Died: Alice Guy-Blaché, 94, pioneering French film director

== March 25, 1968 (Monday) ==
- The 58th and final original episode of The Monkees was aired on NBC television in the United States. The series had premiered on September 12, 1966. A historian would later write "Though the Monkees boasted some great individual musicians it was their television show that rocketed the group to a whole new level."
- Born: Eddie F (stage name for Edward Ferrell), American DJ, record producer and songwriter; in Mount Vernon, New York

== March 26, 1968 (Tuesday) ==
- U.S. president Lyndon Johnson met with his group of advisers, led by Secretary of State Dean Rusk and Secretary of Defense Clark Clifford, who had come to be known as "The Wise Men". After long supporting and encouraging Johnson's conduct of the Vietnam War, a majority of the group informed him bluntly that "an American military solution in Vietnam was no longer attainable" and that he should take steps to disengage the U.S. from further participation. Another author would note that former Secretary of State Dean Acheson told Johnson "the financial and social costs of the struggle... would be hard for the United States to sustain" and noted that "The Wisemen's conclusion that the United States had to find a new way out of Vietnam rocked Johnson as nothing else had."
- Born:
  - Kenny Chesney, American country music singer and CMA Entertainer of the Year for four consecutive years; in Knoxville, Tennessee
  - James Iha, American alternative rock musician and co-founder of The Smashing Pumpkins; in Chicago

== March 27, 1968 (Wednesday) ==
- Ozark Airlines Flight 965 from Sioux Falls, South Dakota to St. Louis, a DC-9 jetliner, was in a collision with a small Cessna 150 as both aircraft approached the Lambert-St. Louis Airport. The Ozark captain, Russell J. Fitch, was able to regain control of the jet after its right wing had been clipped by the Cessna and sustained a fuel tank rupture. Witnesses reported that the Cessna apparently banked to the left and into the path of the DC-9 as the two planes prepared to land on separate runways. The wings of the Cessna fell off and both of the people on board— a flight instructor and his student— were killed when the Cessna fuselage crashed in the suburb of Hazelwood, Missouri.
- At Columbia University in New York City, student Mark Rudd and about 150 other supporters of the university's branch of Students for a Democratic Society occupied the administration building to protest Columbia's continued association with the Institute for Defense Analyses. Columbia's president, Grayson L. Kirk, who was also on the IDA Board of Directors, was not present. After a few hours, the protesters left, and Columbia's Dean of Students ordered Rudd and five other student leaders to report to his office for discipline action. The student protests at the university would attract more participants the following month.
- The Gallup Poll organization announced the results of a cross-section survey of 1,145 registered voters and noted that, for the first time in opinion surveys, Richard M. Nixon was favored over U.S. president Lyndon Johnson and former Alabama governor George C. Wallace in a three-way race. Nixon was favored by 41% of voters, Johnson by 39% and Wallace by 11%. In the first survey, taken in October 1966, President Johnson had had a 51% to 34% edge over Nixon.

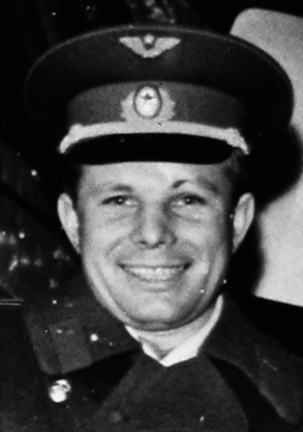
Gagarin

- Died: Yuri Gagarin, 34, Soviet pilot and cosmonaut and the first man to travel into outer space, was killed along with test pilot Vladimir Seryogin, 45, when their MiG-15UTI crashed near Kirzhach. In 2004, declassified Soviet reports showed that a Sukhoi Su-15 jet had been "flying in the area at low altitude" and, while breaking the sound barrier, passed close to Gagarin's plane "causing extensive turbulence" that sent the MiG-15 into a spin.

== March 28, 1968 (Thursday) ==
- Glidrose Publications released the James Bond novel, Colonel Sun by "Robert Markham" (a pseudonym for Kingsley Amis). Initially intended as a relaunch of the Bond book series following the death in 1964 of the character's creator, Ian Fleming, Colonel Sun instead ended up being the final book of the series until its revival by John Gardner in 1981.
- A protest march by striking sanitation workers down Beale Street in Memphis, Tennessee, began peacefully with Martin Luther King Jr. and Ralph Abernathy at the forefront of 6,000 African-Americans, but degenerated into violence and looting, and the shooting by police of a 16-year-old boy named Larry Payne.
- The Storting, Norway's parliament, enacted legislation creating the University of Trondheim and the University of Tromsø. The Tromsø institution, located north of the 69°N latitude and inside the Arctic Circle, is the world's northernmost university.
- Born:
  - Nasser Hussain, Indian-born cricketer and member and captain of the England cricket team, 1999 to 2003; in Madras
  - Iris Chang, American journalist and author; in Princeton, New Jersey (suicide by gunshot, 2004)
- Died:
  - Edson Luís de Lima Souto, 18, a high school student in Brazil, was shot by the police of Guanabara state while campaigning for cheaper meals at a restaurant for low-income students. Students carried him to the legislative assembly building in Rio de Janeiro, insisting on an autopsy. Thousands of people would attend his funeral and his death would lead to demonstrations across the nation, culminating in "The March of the 100,000" on June 25. Forty years later, a memorial to the student would be erected in Rio.
  - Larry Payne, 16, a high school student in Memphis, was shot at close range by a city patrolman while attending a protest march during the Memphis sanitation strike. While the officer claimed that Payne had been stopped from looting and that the youth had threatened him with a knife, no stolen property nor a knife could be found to support his statement, and 25 civilian witnesses said that Payne had emerged from a room empty-handed when he was shot.

== March 29, 1968 (Friday) ==
Republic of New Africa flag

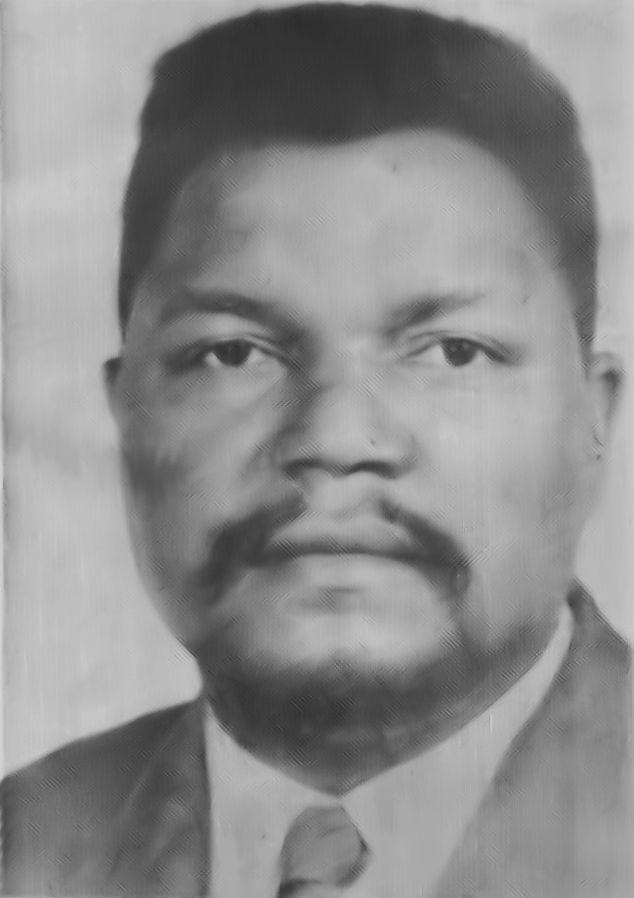
Robert F. Williams

- A group of 500 black activists, led by Robert F. Williams, assembled at the black-owned Twenty Grand Motel in Detroit to proclaim their intention to create the Republic of New Africa, an independent black nation located in areas of the southeastern United States that had predominantly black populations.
- At the University of Paris, commonly called "the Sorbonne" because of its location, the Dean called on French police to arrest students who had been demonstrating peacefully in their demand of reforms.
- Pope Paul VI announced the end of the centuries-old hereditary papal nobility and a reorganization of the Papal Court (Pontificalis Aula) with the release of Pontificalis Domus, an apostolic letter.
- A partial solar eclipse occurred in the polar regions.
- Born: Lucy Lawless, New Zealand television actress who starred in the title role of Xena: Warrior Princess; as Lucille Ryan in Mount Albert

== March 30, 1968 (Saturday) ==
- The first two games of the new North American Soccer League were played, with the earlier of two games in Atlanta, where the Atlanta Chiefs beat the Detroit Cougars, 2–1, after a scoreless first half, in front of 11,086 fans. The first scoring came in a game that started an hour later in Houston, where the Luiz Juracy of the Houston Stars scored 3 goals in a 6–0 win over the Dallas Tornado before 1,472 fans. The season would end where it began, in Atlanta, with the Chiefs winning the 1968 NASL championship at home on September 28.
- Gamal Abdel Nasser, the president of the United Arab Republic (limited to Egypt), announced the Baian 30 Maris, a cleanup of corruption within the UAR government, as well as a complete reform of his political party, the Arab Socialist Union. An author would later describe the declaration as a "major shift under Nasser from repression to liberalization". Egyptian voters would approve the reforms in a referendum on July 1.
- U.S. President Johnson announced at a press conference that he would preempt regular television and radio programming on Sunday to address the nation about the Vietnam War to "discuss troop speculations that have taken place, what our plans are, and what information we are able to talk about now." He added, "I will also talk about other questions of some importance", without elaborating.
- A day after buying a .243 caliber rifle and telescopic sight from Aeromarine Supply, a gun shop in Birmingham, Alabama, escaped convict James Earl Ray would exchange the weapon for a more powerful rifle, the .30-06 Remington Gamemaster. The new rifle would be found five days later near the site of the assassination of Martin Luther King Jr.
- A February 18 agreement took effect creating the "Federation of the Arab Emirates" between Abu Dhabi and Dubai, the federation would be joined by four of the other sheikdoms on the Arabian Peninsula over the next several years and would become independent as the United Arab Emirates in 1971.
- The solemn funeral of Yuri Gagarin and Vladimir Seryogin ended in Moscow, Soviet Union, with the placement of their funerary urns in the Kremlin Wall Necropolis.
- Ludvik Svoboda was formally sworn in as the new president of Czechoslovakia.
- Born:
  - Celine Dion, Canadian singer; in Charlemagne, Quebec
  - Deise Nunes, Brazilian model and Miss Brazil 1986, in Porto Alegre, Rio Grande do Sul, Brazil
- Died: Bobby Driscoll, 31, American child actor known for Song of the South, his dead body was found in a derelict building in Greenwich Village, New York

== March 31, 1968 (Sunday) ==
- U.S. president Lyndon B. Johnson announced, in a nationally televised address, that he would not seek re-election as President of the United States. One historian would write later that the speech was "a political event that would wreck not only the Democratic Party but the liberal consensus that Democrats had forged in the 1960s." Another would note that the speech "marked a critical turning point in the Vietnam War" as Johnson put a limit on the increasing deployment of ground troops, a halt to bombing north of the 20th parallel, and an offer of unconditional peace negotiations with North Vietnam. Johnson began speaking from the White House at 9:00 in the evening, and continued for 35 minutes in describing why he had committed to fighting the war, then spoke about his own career, observing that Americans had united to make "a stronger nation, a more just society, and a land of greater opportunity and fulfillment because of what we have all done together in these years of unparalleled achievement." He added, "What we won when all of our people united just must not now be lost in suspicion, distrust, selfishness, and politics among any of our people." Those people still listening at 9:40 p.m. were stunned when Johnson concluded his address by saying, "With America's sons in the fields far away; with America's future under challenge right here at home; with our hopes and the world's hopes for peace in the balance every day, I do not believe that I should devote an hour or a day of my time to any personal partisan causes or to any duties other than the awesome duties of this office--the Presidency of your country. Accordingly, I shall not seek, and I will not accept, the nomination of my party for another term as your President."
