= Mickelberry Sausage Company plant explosion =

1968 explosion in Chicago

The Mickelberry Sausage Company plant explosion was a massive explosion and fire that killed nine people in Chicago on February 7, 1968. The factory made meat products such as hot dogs, lard, and hams under the Mickleberry Old Farm brand. Mickelberry was founded in 1893. It was located near the corner of 49th Place and South Halsted Street in the city's Back of the Yards (Union Stock Yards) district. Nine people were killed, including four Chicago firefighters. Seventy people were injured.

A gasoline truck was making a delivery in the alley behind the plant, when a valve on the truck was sheared off by a garbage can allowing the gasoline to flow freely. The fuel leaked into the basement of the facility where it ignited causing a series of explosions.

The company's president ran back into the rubble apparently to rescue those trapped inside. He was killed.
