= January 1968 =

Month of 1968

<<	January 1968					>>
Su	Mo	Tu	We	Th	Fr	Sa
	1	2	3	4	5	6
7	8	9	10	11	12	13
14	15	16	17	18	19	20
21	22	23	24	25	26	27
28	29	30	31

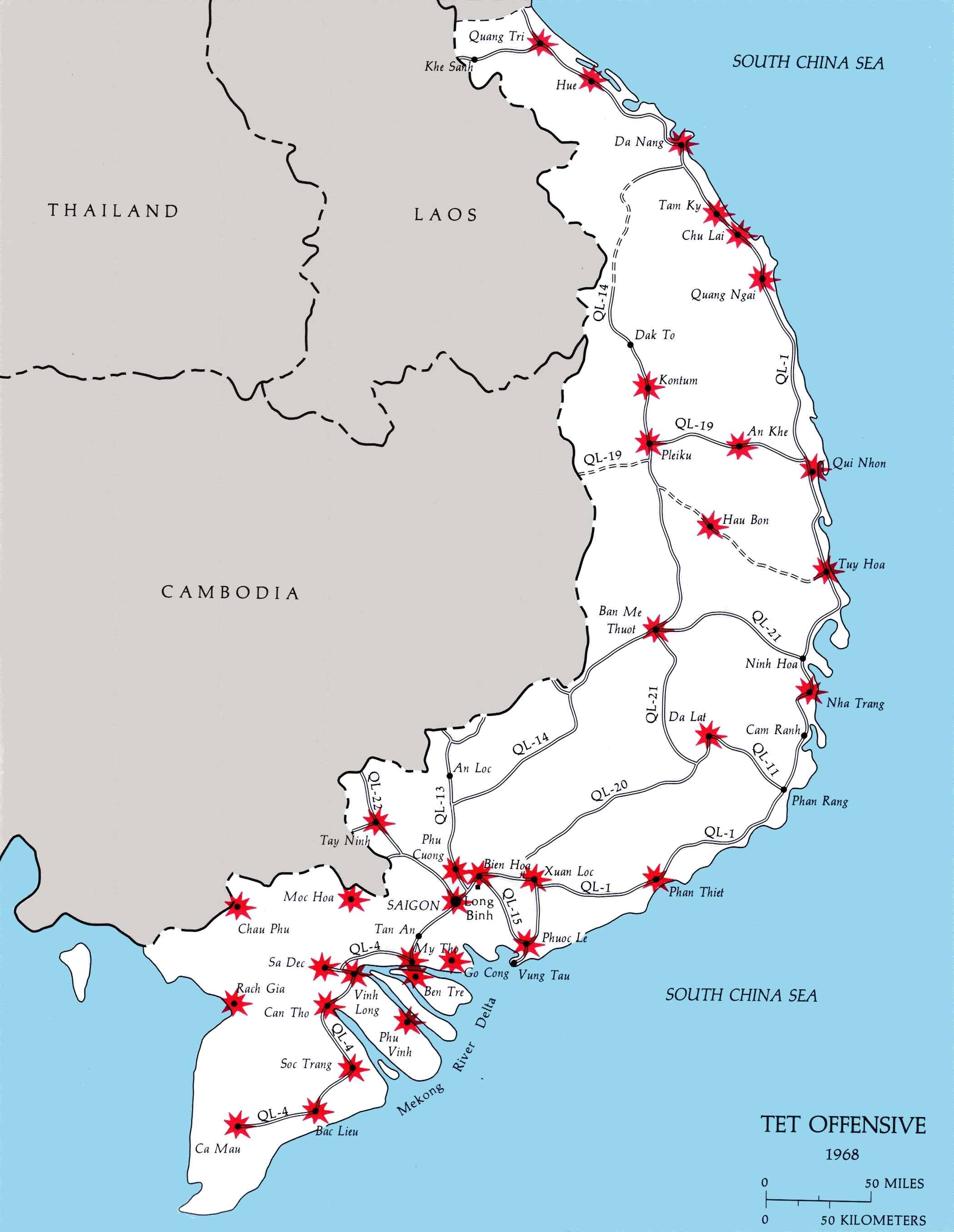
January 30–31, 1968: Viet Cong and North Vietnamese Army stage surprise attack on installations and cities throughout South Vietnam

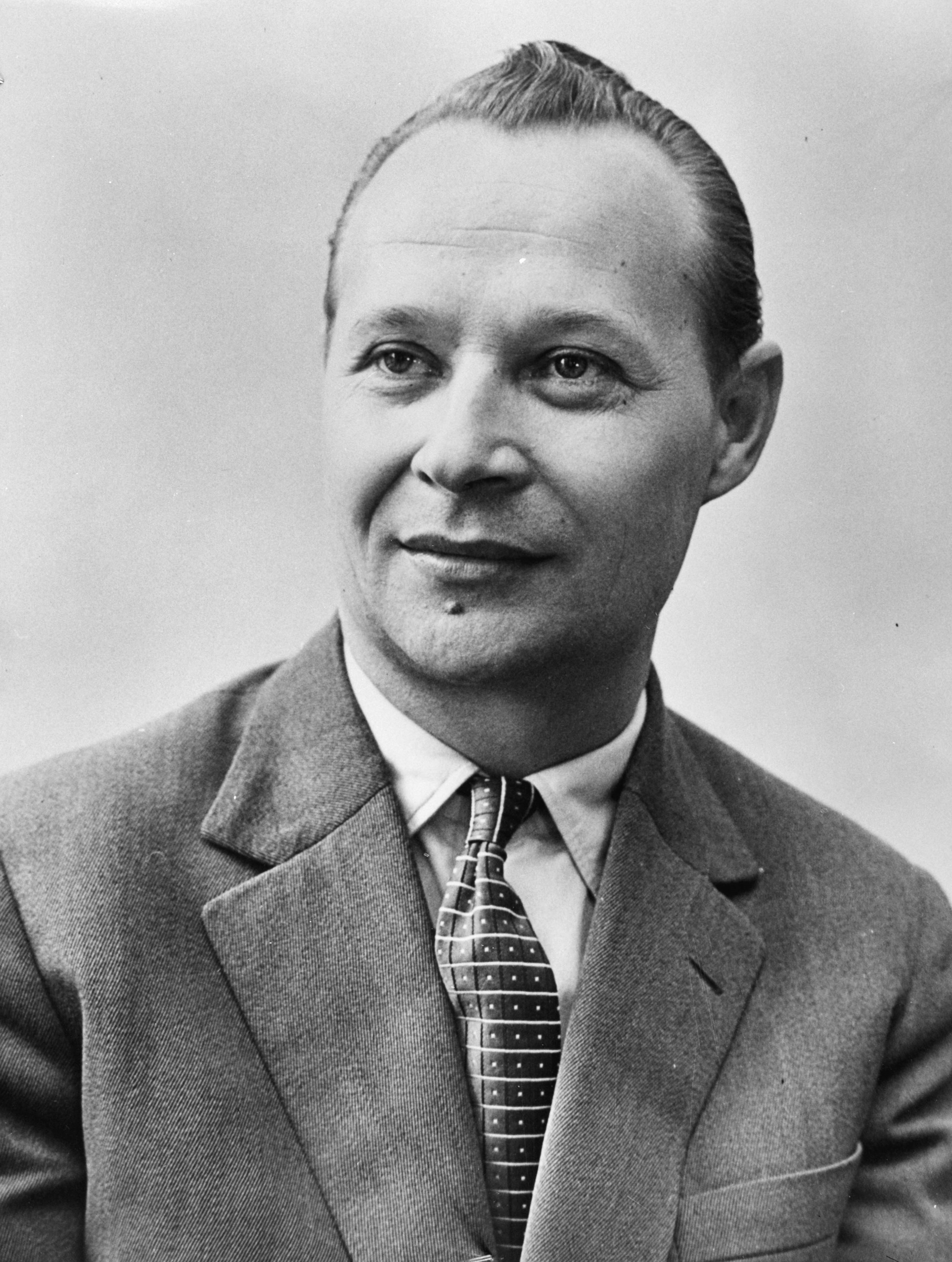
Reformist Alexander Dubček elected Czechoslovak leader by 21-member group of the Czechoslovak Communist Party

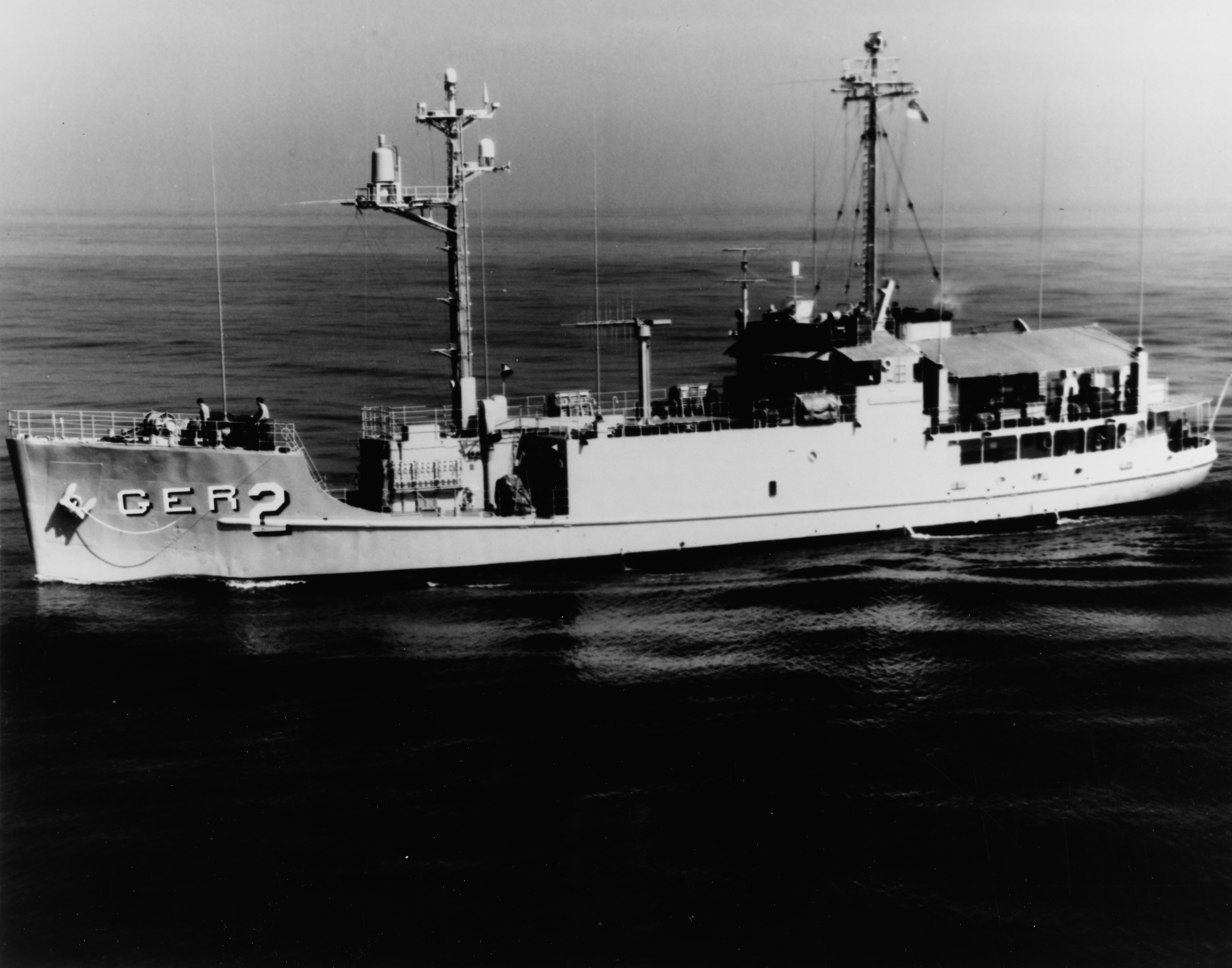
January 23, 1968: USS Pueblo (shown in October 1967) is captured by North Korea and its crew are taken prisoner.

The following events occurred in January 1968:

== January 1, 1968 (Monday) ==
- Ranked as the number one college football team in the United States, the USC Trojans (9–1–0) faced the #4 ranked Indiana Hoosiers (9–1–0) in the Rose Bowl in Pasadena; that evening, the Orange Bowl in Miami pitted the #2 and #3 teams against each other, as the second-ranked Tennessee Volunteers (9–1–0) met the Oklahoma Sooners (9–1–0). The format of #1 vs. #4 and #2 vs. #3 would be used half a century later as the semi-finals for the NCAA Division I football championship game, but there were no playoffs in 1968, and USC, Indiana, Tennessee and Oklahoma were champions of their respective conferences. At the time, the Rose Bowl matched the Pac-8 and Big Ten, while the Orange Bowl featured the SEC and Big Eight. USC defeated Indiana, 14–3, on the strength of two touchdown runs by O. J. Simpson, and would retain its #1 ranking. Oklahoma blew a 19–0 halftime lead over Tennessee, but held off a furious Tennessee comeback which came down to an unsuccessful field goal attempt by West German-born kicker Karl Kremser, and won the game, 26–24. USC and Oklahoma would not meet for a title game, but would be ranked first and second in the final sportswriters' and coaches' polls.
- A new universal military service law went into effect in the Soviet Union, requiring all able-bodied men to report for duty on their 18th birthdays. High school graduates were required to serve for one year; men in the army or air force had to stay two years, and those in the navy or coast guard had three years required service. The new law replaced a 1939 law that required three years in the army or air force, and four years in the navy or coast guard.
- The Viet Cong kept up their record of breaking agreed ceasefires by killing 19 South Vietnamese troops during the 1968 New Year truce period in the Vietnam War.
- Cecil Day-Lewis was named as the 19th Poet Laureate of the United Kingdom, replacing the late John Masefield, who had died on May 12.
- Born: Davor Šuker, Croatian soccer football player and sports executive; in Osijek, SR Croatia, Yugoslavia
- Died: Donagh MacDonagh, 55, Irish playwright

== January 2, 1968 (Tuesday) ==
- U.S. President Lyndon Johnson signed the Bilingual Education Act into law. At the signing ceremony, Johnson said, "Thousands of children of Latin descent, young Indians, and others will get a better start— a better chance— in school... We are now giving every child in America a better chance to touch his outermost limits. We have begun a campaign to unlock the full potential of every boy and girl, regardless of his race, or his religion, or his father's income."
- The 36-hour ceasefire in the Vietnam War expired at 0600 hours local time; during the New Year's Day truce, there were 64 major violations by the Viet Cong and North Vietnamese Army (NVA). Later in the day, a U.S. Marine Corps patrol at Khe Sanh killed a high-ranking NVA regimental commander and five other officers who had been inspecting the site, an indication of plans for a major attack.
- Sugar Ray Robinson, Joe Jeanette and Barney Aaron were inducted into The Ring Magazine Hall of Fame; the International Boxing Hall of Fame would be founded in 1990.
- Dr. Christiaan Barnard performed the third human heart transplant in history, and the first that would be considered successful enough that the recipient was able to go home from the hospital. Philip Blaiberg, a 58-year old retired dentist living in Cape Town, South Africa, would leave the hospital after 73 days and would survive for another 17 months until his death on August 17, 1969. The donor was 24-year old Clive Haupt, who had died from a massive cerebral hemorrhage.
- Born: Cuba Gooding, Jr., American film actor who won an Oscar for Best Supporting Actor in Jerry Maguire; in The Bronx, New York

== January 3, 1968 (Wednesday) ==
- Cuba began rationing gasoline for the first time since Fidel Castro's regime had taken power nine years earlier. In a speech the night before on the anniversary of the revolution, Castro announced that car-owners would be allowed to purchase between eight and 25 gallons per month, depending on the horsepower of their vehicles.
- U.S. Senator Eugene J. McCarthy of Minnesota announced that he would directly challenge President Johnson for the Democratic Party nomination for president and arranged to have his name placed on the ballot for the New Hampshire primary.
- The Panton Chair was introduced on the market for the first time by the Herman Miller Corporation.

== January 4, 1968 (Thursday) ==
- An operation by the U.S. 4th Infantry Division in the Dak To area of South Vietnam captured a classified five-page North Vietnamese document, titled "Urgent Combat Order No. 1", that described the strategy for a series of attacks to take place in Pleiku in conjunction with the upcoming Tet holiday.
- At a meeting with his cabinet, British Prime Minister Harold Wilson first presented the proposal for the United Kingdom to withdraw from defending Malaysia and Singapore by the end of March 1971 and to pull out its troops stationed east of the Suez Canal by the middle of 1972.
- Following two shows at the Lorensberg Cirkus arena in Gothenburg, singer Jimi Hendrix was arrested for vandalizing his room at the Opelan Hotel. Hendrix was kept in jail overnight, then released to continue his tour of Sweden.
- Died: Joseph Pholien, 83, Prime Minister of Belgium from 1950 to 1952

== January 5, 1968 (Friday) ==
- Alexander Dubček was chosen as the leader of the Komunistická strana Československa (KSČ), the Communist Party of Czechoslovakia, after the KSČ Central Committee voted to remove Antonín Novotný because of his ineffective leadership of the nation. Novotny was allowed to continue in his post as President of Czechoslovakia, though he would be removed from that job in March. Recommendations for the new First Secretary had been delegated by the Central Committee to a 21-member "Consultative Group" composed of representatives from regional party committees. On January 4, the group was divided with seven preferring Dubček, six in favor of Prime Minister Jozef Lenárt, and four apiece for Deputy Premier Oldřich Černík and National Assembly Chairman Bohuslav Lastovička. The choice was narrowed down on Friday morning to Dubček or Lenárt, and the Consultative Group selected Dubček by "a decisive majority" of the 21 members.
- Romanian First Deputy Foreign Minister Macovescu met with U.S. Ambassador W. Averell Harriman to provide a message from top officials in Hanoi, with whom he had just visited. Macovescu provided the clearest indication yet that Hanoi would be willing to open negotiations with the United States if the bombing of North Vietnam was suspended; however, Hanoi did not provide any promises regarding not taking advantage of the bombing pause such as increasing infiltration of men and material into South Vietnam or an all-out invasion across the DMZ.
- Born:
  - Carrie Ann Inaba, American dancer and television host; in Honolulu
  - Tom Holland, British author; in Oxfordshire

== January 6, 1968 (Saturday) ==
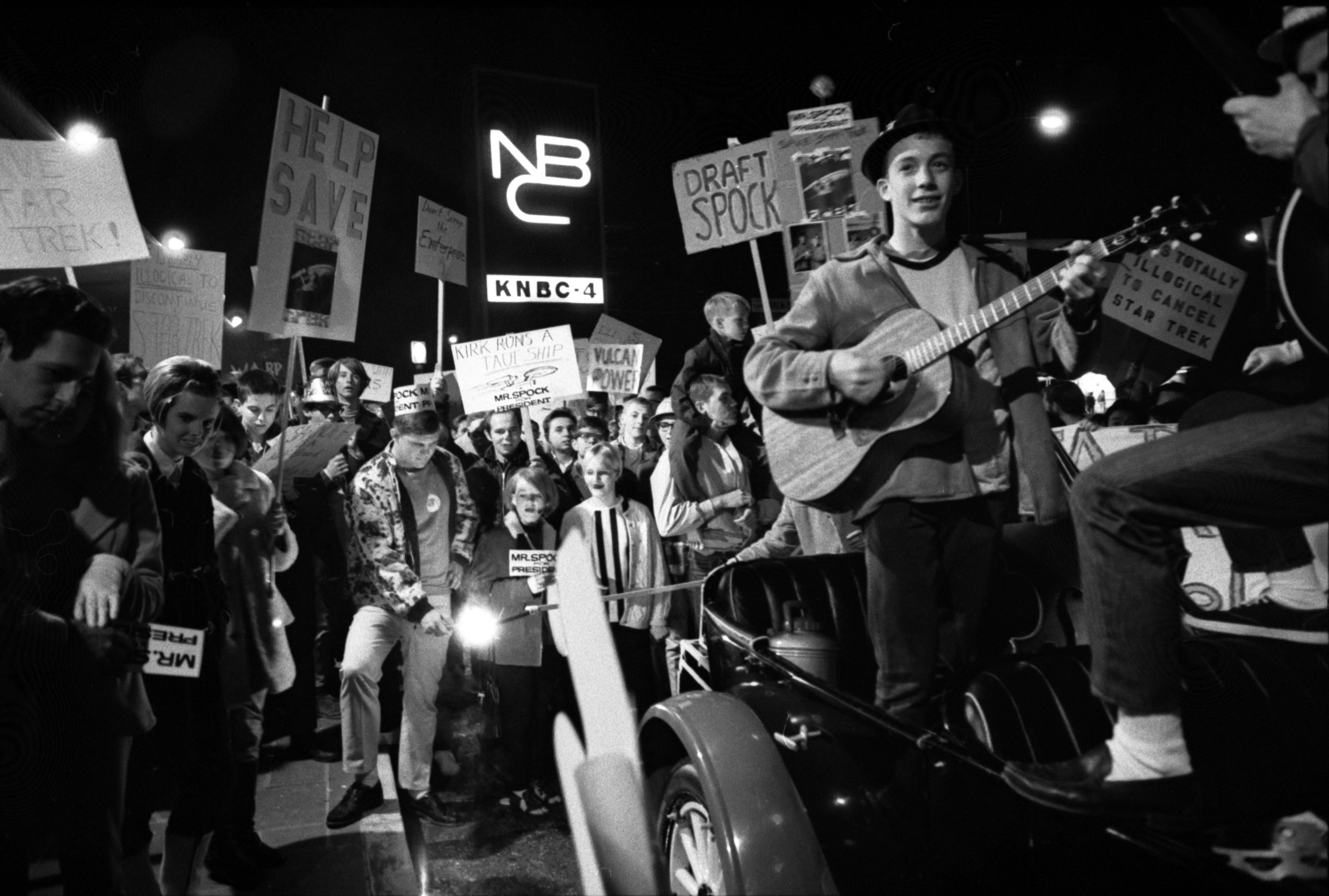
January 6, 1968: Caltech students protesting rumored cancellation of Star Trek

- According to the Los Angeles Times, a group of "more than 200" Caltech students marched to and demonstrated in front of NBC's studios in Burbank as part of what appeared to be a grassroots campaign, actually orchestrated by Gene Roddenberry, to get the network to renew Star Trek for a third season.
- The Agartala Conspiracy Case arose with the indictment and arrest of 35 people in East Pakistan who were charged with plotting the secession of the eastern part of Pakistan from the rest of the nation. Sheikh Mujibur Rahman, named as the leader of the plot, was charged with traveling to the Indian city of Agartala to meet with P. N. Ojha, India's representative to the East, in hopes of military support. East Pakistan, whose residents primarily spoke Bengali, comprised more than half of Pakistan's population, but only 10 percent of its government officials, the West Pakistan residents who primarily spoke Urdu. Sheikh Mujib and the other defendants would be put on trial on June 19, leading to mass demonstrations, a civil war, and the eventual separation of East Pakistan as the nation of Bangladesh, with Sheikh Mujib as its first President.
- The collision of an express train and a truck stalled on the tracks killed 13 people in England, all of them passengers on the train. The truck driver and his-coworker were uninjured. At Hixon, a village in Staffordshire the truck was slowly hauling a 125-ton electrical transformer over the crossing when the Manchester to London southbound express train arrived with 500 people on board. The crossing gates lowered automatically, preventing the truck from completing its move off of the crossing, and the locomotive and eight cars derailed.
- In South Korea, President Park Chung Hee agreed to the petition by the nation's Hangul Society to phasing out the use of Chinese that were taught in schools and which were published in conjunction with the Korean alphabet (hangul), with Korean replacements for the Chinese symbols. Instructions would follow on October 25, reducing the number of Chinese words to 2,000 by year's end, 1,300 by the end of 1969, and eliminated altogether by the end of 1972.
- Norman Shumway performed the first successful heart transplant in the United States, operating at the Stanford University Hospital in California. The donor was a 43-year-old woman, Virginia May White, who had suffered a cerebral hemorrhage while celebrating her 22nd wedding anniversary; the recipient was Mike Casparak, a 54-year-old steelworker dying of viral myocarditis. Casparak survived only 15 days, dying on January 21 from liver failure.
- A 27-person team of surgeons at the Transvaal Memorial Hospital for Children (located in Johannesburg, South Africa) successfully completed the separation of conjoined twins, Catherine O'Hare and Shirely O'Hare, who had been joined at the head. Two previous attempts to separate twins conjoined at the head had ended with only one of the twins surviving.
- All 45 people on board an Aeroflot An-24B airliner were killed when the plane exploded in midair while flying from Olyokminsk to Lensk.
- Born: John Singleton, African-American director known for Boyz n the Hood (d. 2019); in Los Angeles
- Died: Karl Kobelt, 76, President of Switzerland in 1946 and 1952 in the course of his membership in the Swiss Federal Council from 1940 to 1954

== January 7, 1968 (Sunday) ==
- The price of mailing a letter in the United States increased by 20%, requiring six cents of postage to replace the five-cent postage stamp. The increase went into effect exactly five years after the 1963 increase from four cents to five.
- Forty-three passengers on a bus in South Korea were killed near Jinju when their bus lost one of its front wheels, went out of control, fell over a 33-foot (10 m) high cliff and sank in the Nam River.
- Surveyor 7, the last of the Surveyor lunar probes launched by the United States, was sent up from Cape Kennedy at 0630 UTC (1:30 in the morning). It would land on the Moon on January 10.
- Died:
  - Gholamreza Takhti, 37, popular Athlete Wrestler who won a gold medal for Iran in the 1956 Summer Olympics, was found dead in his hotel room of an overdose of sleeping pills. Officially, the death was a suicide but many of Takhti's fans thought he had been murdered.
  - Mario Roatta, 80, former Chief of Staff of the Italian Army during World War II, died two years after his return from a post-war exile in Spain.
  - Ephraim Longworth, 80, English soccer football star who played for Liverpool F.C. from 1910 to 1928
  - Hugo Butler, 53, blacklisted Canadian-born screenwriter, died of a heart attack.

== January 8, 1968 (Monday) ==
- All 41 U.S. personnel aboard a Sikorsky CH-53 Sea Stallion helicopter were killed in the worst helicopter accident of the Vietnam War. The U.S. Marine Corps aircraft had a five-man crew and was transporting 31 Marines, three Navy men, one from the Army and one civilian and was on flying southward from Dong Ha, near the DMZ, to Phu Bai in bad weather. The CH-53 was found four days later, and had apparently slammed into the side of a steep mountain peak.
- Pierre Guillard, a mentally ill French man, gouged several holes with a knife in Rubens' The Virgin and Child Surrounded by the Holy Innocents at The Louvre.
- Otis Redding's single "(Sittin' On) The Dock of the Bay" was released, less than a month after the plane crash that claimed his life.
- The Undersea World of Jacques Cousteau made its debut on the ABC television network in the United States.
- Italy and Yugoslavia signed a treaty setting their nation's respective boundaries in the Adriatic Sea.
- A collision between two Boston subway trains injured 61 people, but there were no fatalities.
- The Greek cargo ship Peltastis with the crew of twelve, sailing northwest from Sveti Juraj in heavy weather and carrying 500m³ of lumber, struck the coast between Šilo and Klimno at 03:50 local time and sank; eight crew members were killed, including the captain Theodoros Belesis, who had ordered the sailors to tie him to the ship's wheel; the four survivors suffered heavy injuries.
- Born: James Brokenshire, British MP and Secretary of State for Northern Ireland from 2016 to 2018; in Southend-on-Sea (died of lung cancer, 2021)

== January 9, 1968 (Tuesday) ==
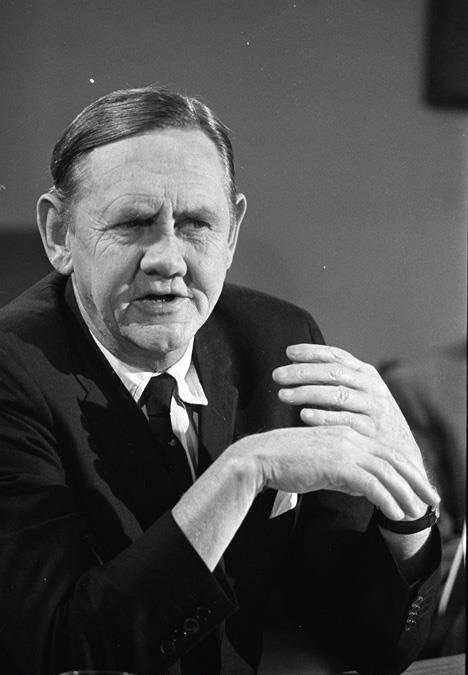
Gorton

- In Australia, a Liberal Party leadership election was held to elect a successor to the late Prime Minister Harold Holt, who had drowned on December 17. Initially, there were four candidates for the leadership of the party, which was tantamount to the prime ministership: John Gorton, Paul Hasluck, Les Bury, and Billy Snedden. No candidate received a majority, but Bury and Snedden received the fewest votes and were eliminated from consideration. On the second ballot, Gorton won an absolute majority over Hasluck; he was sworn in as prime minister the following day.
- NASA budgetary restraints required an additional cut in Apollo Applications Program (AAP) launches. The reduced program called for three Saturn IB and three Saturn V launches, including one Workshop launched on a Saturn IB, one Saturn V Workshop, and one Apollo Telescope Mount (ATM). Two lunar missions were planned. Launch of the first Workshop would be in April 1970. Marshall Space Flight Center (MSFC) awarded Perkin-Elmer Corporation a contract to develop the telescopes for the ATM.
- U.S. President Lyndon Johnson polled ahead of Richard Nixon, the favored candidate for the Republican nomination, in two national surveys, including one by The Washington Post. The poll indicated that if the November 1968 election was held in January, the incumbent president would defeat any of the four most prominent possibilities for Republican nomination, specifically Richard Nixon, George W. Romney, Ronald Reagan and Nelson Rockefeller.
- For the first time since 1955, the weather stopped the clocks in the tower that houses Big Ben in London. Snow drifts and intense cold caused the clocks' hands to stop at 6:28 a.m.; maintenance crews were able to restart the clock nearly four hours later, at 10:10.
- Renovated and refit after being purchased from the United Kingdom, the Israeli submarine INS Dakar departed from Portsmouth Harbour on its first voyage for the Israeli Navy. All contact with the sub would be lost 15 days later.
- The National Football League Players Association (NFLPA) formally established itself as an independent labor union; the players would strike 6 months later, leading to the league's first collective bargaining agreement.
- Three nations— Saudi Arabia, Kuwait and Libya — that were members of both OPEC and the Arab League formed the Organization of Arab Petroleum Exporting Countries (OAPEC).
- At 7:05 p.m. in Houston (0105 UTC on January 10), NASA Mission Control successfully landed Surveyor 7 on the Moon, 18 miles (29 km) north of the Tycho crater.
- The United States Secret Service confiscated $4.1 million in counterfeit money at John F. Kennedy Airport, at the time the largest seizure in history.
- Born:
  - Cameron Todd Willingham, a possibly innocent American man who was convicted and executed for the murder of his three children by arson at his family home in Corsicana, Texas on December 23, 1991; in Ardmore, Oklahoma (executed, 2004)
  - Joey Lauren Adams, American film actress known for Dazed and Confused and Chasing Amy; in North Little Rock, Arkansas
- Died: Kōkichi Tsuburaya, 27, Japanese marathon runner and bronze medalist in the 1964 Summer Olympics, committed suicide after concluding that his back problems would prevent him from being on the Olympic team in 1968. In a suicide note he wrote, "Kokichi is too tired to run anymore."

== January 10, 1968 (Wednesday) ==
- The British submarine HMS Grampus was ensnared in the nets of a fishing boat, immobilizing both vessels traveling in the Bay of Biscay off the west coast of France. The French trawler Fomalhaut was dragging its nets deep in the bay when it hit something that brought it to a halt. Ninety feet below the surface, the Grampus would not maneuver. Complicating matters, nobody on the Fomalhaut spoke English and nobody on the Grampus spoke French. After a few hours, the trawling cable was cut and the Grampus sailed onward, "with her conning tower still draped with nets", to continue in a scheduled naval exercise.
- Fifteen U.S. battalions in South Vietnam were relocated from the border with North Vietnam, and ordered moved by General William C. Westmoreland to new positions around Saigon and other major cities. While the U.S. would benefit from the decision later in the month, it "failed to anticipate the timing and, more particularly, scale and character" of the full-scale attack in the Tet Offensive.
- India rescinded its approval of the Tashkent Declaration that had been signed with Pakistan exactly two years earlier (January 10, 1966) as tensions escalated between the neighboring nations.
- Born: Lyle Menendez, American murderer who, along with his brother Erik, shot and killed their parents in their Beverly Hills, California mansion in 1989; in Woodbury, New Jersey
- Died: Eben Dönges (Theophilus Ebenhaezer Dönges), 69, South African President-elect and former Prime Minister. On June 1, Dönges had been elected to the honorary post of State President, but had suffered a stroke before he could take office and fell into a coma from which he never awoke.

== January 11, 1968 (Thursday) ==
- In Geneva, the International Red Cross announced that Israel and Egypt had agreed to conditions for releasing the prisoners of war who had been captured in June during the Six-Day War. At the time, there were 4,000 Egyptian POWs and only 20 Israeli ones to be exchanged, in that agreements had already been worked out with Jordan, Syria, Lebanon and Iraq. The transfers took place between Ismailia on the west side of the Suez Canal, and El Qantara on the east side in Egyptian territory occupied and controlled by the Israel Defense Forces.
- British Foreign Secretary George Brown met with his American counterpart, U.S. Secretary of State Dean Rusk, to tell him that Britain's economic problems had led it to a decision to no longer police the Middle East or Southeast Asia. In a meeting that Brown would refer to as "bloody unpleasant", Rusk reportedly said, "Be British, George, be British. How can you betray us?", although the official U.S. State Department transcript of the conversation does not record this remark.
- S. T. Muna was appointed as the new Prime Minister of West Cameroon, while S. P. Tchoungui continued as the Prime Minister of a reorganized East Cameroon, both under the direction of Ahmadou Ahidjo, the President of the Federal Republic of Cameroon. In 1972, the offices of Muna and Tchoungui would be abolished.
- The U.S. Navy electronic surveillance ship USS Pueblo was dispatched from the port of Sasebo, Nagasaki toward North Korea for a 17-day mission to collect intelligence.
- The government of Israel expropriated 838 acres of former Jordanian land in East Jerusalem in order to restore the city's Jewish Quarter.
- Died:
  - Moshe Zvi Segal, 81, Israeli rabbi and Talmudic scholar
  - Marcello Pirani, 87, German-born physicist

== January 12, 1968 (Friday) ==
- Norman M. Yoder, an official within the Pennsylvania Department of Human Services and commissioner of the state's office that offered services to the blind and visually impaired, told the Associated Press that six college students, all of them men and "all juniors at a western Pennsylvania college" which he declined to identify, had permanently lost their eyesight after taking the hallucinogen LSD and staring at the Sun, not realizing what they were doing. Skeptical reporters began investigating, starting with calls to the state's colleges, Pennsylvania Governor Raymond P. Shafer ordered his Attorney General to make an inquiry and Yoder confessed that he had made the story up.
- The American Telephone and Telegraph Company (AT&T), which controlled all but a few of the telephones in the United States, announced plans to provide a universal emergency telephone number that could be dialed quickly from any telephone in the country, and said that it would allocate $50,000,000 to install the routing equipment in American cities over a period of several years, starting with the exchanges in Washington, D.C. and New York City. According to AT&T, a computer search found that the number most likely to have no conflict with an existing area code or exchange, and to also meet the requirement of not being misdialed from a rotary phone, was 9-1-1.
- The trial of four Soviet writers ended with verdicts of being guilty of subversion, and sentences ranging from one to seven years. Poet Yuri Galanskov received the longest term after being convicted of sedition for working with the anti-Communist organization Narodno-Trudovoy Soyuz (NTS, the "People's Labor Union"), and author Alexander Ginzburg got five years. Vera Lashkova was sentenced to one year incarceration, but was given credit for nearly a year of detention. Alexei Dobrovolsky got a reduced two-year sentence in exchange for testifying against Galanskov and Ginzburg.
- Zambia released all five members of the South African Police who had been held in the jail in Livingstone since December 27. The five men had driven across the Victoria Falls Bridge from Rhodesia into Zambia, then ignored an order by border police to stop, and were "given a taste of the local gaol" before being deported. The release followed an apology by South Africa's foreign minister, Hilgard Muller, to Zambia's President Kenneth Kaunda.
- The Kampuchean Revolutionary Army, which would carry out a genocide program in Cambodia between 1975 and 1979, was established by the orders of Pol Pot, the leader of the southeast Asian nation's Communist party, the CPK.
- Born:
  - Junichi Masuda, Japanese video game composer and designer, best known for his work in the Pokémon franchise; in Yokohama, Kanagawa
  - Rachael Harris, American actress who portrayed the mother in the Diary of a Wimpy Kid film series; in Worthington, Ohio
  - Keith Anderson, American country music singer; in Miami, Oklahoma
  - Christopher Gartin, American actor and producer; in New York City
- Died: Rezső Seress, 78, Hungarian composer whose 1933 song "Gloomy Sunday", was blamed for multiple suicides, committed suicide in Budapest.

== January 13, 1968 (Saturday) ==
- Bill Masterton, a center for the Minnesota North Stars of the National Hockey League, was fatally injured during a game against the Oakland Seals when he received a body check by two defenders while skating toward the Oakland goal with the puck. The incident happened in the early minutes of the game in front of a crowd of 12,119 spectators; after Masterton was taken from the rink and blood cleaned from the ice, play continued in a game that would end in a 2–2 tie. Masterton (who was known for scoring the North Stars' very first goal when the team began play on October 11, 1967) would die 30 hours later from brain hemorrhaging caused by severe head trauma.
- Johnny Cash performed his historic concert at the Folsom State Prison in California, selected by his manager because of Cash's 1955 hit song "Folsom Prison Blues". The concert was not the first that Cash had performed at a penal institution, nor was Cash the only artist to appear that day (the Statler Brothers, Carl Perkins, The Carter Family, and The Tennessee Three were also present), but it was the first time that Cash had recorded a live album inside a prison. Johnny Cash At Folsom Prison would become the number one country music album in the United States after going on sale in May.
- Standing Naval Force Atlantic (STANAVFORLANT), a multinational naval force with ships from the Netherlands, Norway, the United Kingdom and the United States, was activated for the first time, with a base at England's Portland Harbour. Within six months, Canada, West Germany and Portugal would each contribute ships and crews as well.
- U.S. Ambassador to Saigon Ellsworth Bunker provided U.S. President Lyndon Johnson with his review of the areas of progress in Vietnam during 1967.
- Born:
  - Andy Jassy, American business executive and President and CEO of Amazon since 2021; in Scarsdale, New York
  - Pat Onstad, Canadian soccer football goalkeeper with 60 caps for the Canada national team; in Vancouver

== January 14, 1968 (Sunday) ==
- The Green Bay Packers defeated the Oakland Raiders, 33–14 in Super Bowl II before 75,546 fans at the Orange Bowl in Miami. Vince Lombardi retired as the Packers head coach after the event, which was still referred to officially as the AFL–NFL World Championship Game.
- The Battle of Nam Bac, between the Royal Armed Forces of Laos and attackers from the North Vietnamese Army and the Communist Pathet Lao group, ended with the 3,000 remaining Nam Bac defenders being killed or captured.
- Born: LL Cool J (stage name for James Todd Smith), American rapper and actor; in Bay Shore, New York

== January 15, 1968 (Monday) ==
- In Belgium, the campus of the Catholic University of Leuven erupted in violence that spilled into the city of Leuven, after the clergy administering the 440-year-old institution announced that they would continue to hold classes in French (spoken by the Walloon minority in the school) in addition to Flemish Dutch language. Hundreds of students were arrested, and the revolt would spread to other universities and towns in the northern part of the kingdom, leading to the resignation of the Belgian government on February 7. At the end of the spring semester, the university would split into two institutions, with the Flemish-speaking students and professors continuing at the Katholieke Universiteit Leuven, and the opening of a new campus 30 kilometres (19 miles) away at Louvain-la-Neuve for the French-speaking Université Catholique de Louvain.
- An earthquake in Sicily, known in Italy as Il Terremoto del Belice, killed 380 people and injured around 1,000. Occurring in the valley along the Belice River, the 6.4 magnitude quake struck at 2:01 in the morning and destroyed the villages of Gibellina, Montevago and Salaparuta, and causing heavy damage to Santa Margherita di Belice, Poggioreale, Santa Ninfa and Salemi.
- The Man from U.N.C.L.E. aired its final episode, the second part of a two-parter called "The Seven Wonders of the World Affair".
- Born: Chad Lowe, American TV actor and the younger brother of actor Rob Lowe; in Dayton, Ohio
- Died: Bill Masterton, 29, Canadian ice hockey player, became the first and only NHL player to die of injuries received in a game. The league now awards the Masterton Trophy annually to the player "who best exemplifies the qualities of perseverance, sportsmanship, and dedication to ice hockey".

== January 16, 1968 (Tuesday) ==
- British Prime Minister Harold Wilson addressed the House of Commons and announced his government's decision to remove its military presence from the Persian Gulf and from all of Asia (with the exception of Hong Kong) by January 31, 1971. The reaction from those who remembered the height of the British Empire varied; an editorial in the New Statesman said of the decision, "It is comparable in importance to Mr Attlee's granting of Indian independence and the Tory government's evacuation of British Africa", while others pointed out that the cost of keeping a British presence in the Persian Gulf, "some £12 million yearly, was negligible compared to the immense revenues in oil."
- South Vietnam's President Nguyễn Văn Thiệu and U.S. Army commander William C. Westmoreland met at Thiệu's office and decided that they would end the scheduled Tet holiday truce with North Vietnam, four days ahead of schedule, though the announcement of the decision would not be made until January 30. According to the memoirs of a North Vietnamese spy who had infiltrated the Thiệu offices, North Vietnam's military leaders decided to move the date of the Tet Offensive from February 5 to January 31.
- Urho Kekkonen won re-election to a third term as President of Finland, receiving the votes of his own Centre Party, as well as those of the Finnish People's Democratic League and the Social Democratic Party, for 201 of the 300 electoral votes. Two rival candidates (Matti Virkkunen of the National Coalition Party and Veikko Vennamo of the Finnish Rural Party) got 66 and 33 electoral votes apiece. Kekkonen won 56% of the popular votes (1,152,700 of 2,049,002).
- A team of 31 armed guerrillas from North Korea crossed the 38th parallel into South Korea on a mission to attack the Blue House, the residence of the President of South Korea.
- The Prime of Miss Jean Brodie, based on the novel by Muriel Spark, premiered on Broadway; the lead actress Zoe Caldwell would win a Tony for her role as the title character.
- Born:
  - Stephan Pastis, American cartoonist known for the comic strip Pearls Before Swine; in San Marino, California
  - Atticus Ross, Oscar-winning film composer known for the score for The Social Network; in London
- Died: Bob Jones Sr., 84, American evangelist and religious broadcaster who founded Bob Jones University

== January 17, 1968 (Wednesday) ==
- The Kampuchean Revolutionary Army launched its first attack, with three Khmer Rouge guerrillas storming a police post at Bay Damram in Cambodia's Battambang Province to steal weapons. Getting away with several guns, the men had overlooked getting ammunition; when they came back a second time to get it, they got the wrong ammunition. The next day, the uprising saw the seizure of weapons in other villages and the killing of three policemen in ambushes, followed by a deadly attack a week later at a guard post in Thvak; the Kampuchean revolutionaries would take control of Cambodia seven years later and begin a reign of terror.
- Auto manufacturers British Motor Holdings and Leyland Motor Corporation announced their merger to become British Leyland. The new entity became the largest car company in the United Kingdom and the sixth largest in the world (after General Motors, Ford Motor, Chrysler, Fiat, and Volkswagen). Models under the British Leyland umbrella included Jaguar, MG, Triumph, and Land Rover.
- Born: Svetlana Masterkova, Russian athlete and holder of the women's world record for fastest kilometer (2:28.98) since 1996 and for fastest mile (4 minutes, 12.56 seconds) from 1996 to 2019, as well as winner of the 800m and 1500m races in the 1996 Olympics; in Achinsk, Russian SFSR, Soviet Union

== January 18, 1968 (Thursday) ==
- Singer and actress Eartha Kitt was a guest at the White House at a luncheon hosted by Lady Bird Johnson to honor a group of "Women Doers", influential women invited by the First Lady to talk about specific issues. When President Johnson entered the dining room, Kitt asked him what appeared to be a routine question about "delinquent parents", and didn't like the answer that she had been given. Although Kitt didn't vent her anger on the President himself, her confrontation with the First Lady about the Vietnam War became an embarrassing incident. "I have a baby and then you send him off to war", Kitt reportedly said, "No wonder the kids rebel and take pot. And, Mrs. Johnson, in case you don't understand the lingo, that's marijuana!" Afterward, Kitt would experience "a slow decline in her career". Two days later in a telephone call Chicago Mayor Richard Daley expressed his support for Ladybird and revealed that a 500 strong woman's group in Chicago had declared their support for Ladybird in the incident including a lady whose 20-year-old son had recently died in Vietnam. Hanoi immediately used Kitt's outburst for their own propaganda purposes.
- The first Red Lobster seafood restaurant was opened, with a single location at 1330 East Memorial Boulevard in Lakeland, Florida, operated by Bill Darden and Charley Woodsby. Fifty years later, the company would have more than 700 Red Lobster restaurants in 11 countries. Before Red Lobster, Darden had started his first restaurant, "The Green Frog", in Waycross, Georgia, in 1939.
- King Hussein of Jordan alerted U.S. State Department officials about a serious threat by Arab terrorists to assassinate Israeli Defense Minister Moshe Dayan. Hussein had learned of the plot while on a visit to Saudi Arabia.
- Born: David Ayer, American film director known for Fury and Suicide Squad; in Champaign, Illinois
- Died: Bert Wheeler, 72, American comedian who was part of the vaudeville act of Wheeler & Woolsey until Robert Woolsey's death in 1938

== January 19, 1968 (Friday) ==
- As part of Operation Crosstie, the U.S. carried out "Project Faultless", an experiment to see if an earthquake could be triggered by detonating an underground nuclear weapon along a fault line. After the residents of the closest towns to the Central Nevada Test Site (Tonopah and Eureka, Nevada) were briefed about what to expect, an atomic bomb was detonated in Nye County at a depth of 3,200 feet (980 m). The blast, described by the Atomic Energy Commission as being one megaton, was believed to be the most powerful nuclear weapon ever exploded in the United States, and caused upheavals and dropping of the ground in a wide area, breaking windows 87 miles (140 km) away at a high school in Ely. Because of the surface damage, the test site would eventually be declared unsuitable. According to reports the next day, "Buildings swayed in Salt Lake City and San Francisco", particularly in the Southern Pacific building in the California city; the tremor caused by the blast was estimated by the University of California at Berkeley to be 6.0 on the Richter scale.
- U.S. President Johnson completed the installation of a tape recording system in the Cabinet Room of the White House to preserve his discussions of meetings with the leaders of government departments that comprised the presidential cabinet and with other advisers. Roughly 200 hours worth of recordings would be delivered to the Johnson presidential library after Johnson's death in 1973. Despite Johnson's own wish that the recordings be sealed for 50 years after his passing (until January 22, 2023), most were released after 1992.
- Thousands of people protested in Japan as the American aircraft carrier USS Enterprise made the first visit to that nation by a nuclear-powered ship, docking at the U.S. Navy base at Sasebo. The port was about 50 miles (80 km) from Nagasaki, which on August 9, 1945, had seen the second and last site of nuclear warfare. Permission had been granted by Prime Minister Eisaku Satō, who had made the decision without consultation with his Foreign Minister or with any other members of his cabinet.
- Born: Matt Hill, Canadian voice actor known for portraying "Ed" on Ed, Edd, 'n' Eddy; in North Vancouver, British Columbia
- Died: Ray Harroun, 89, American race car driver who, in 1911, won the very first Indianapolis 500

== January 20, 1968 (Saturday) ==
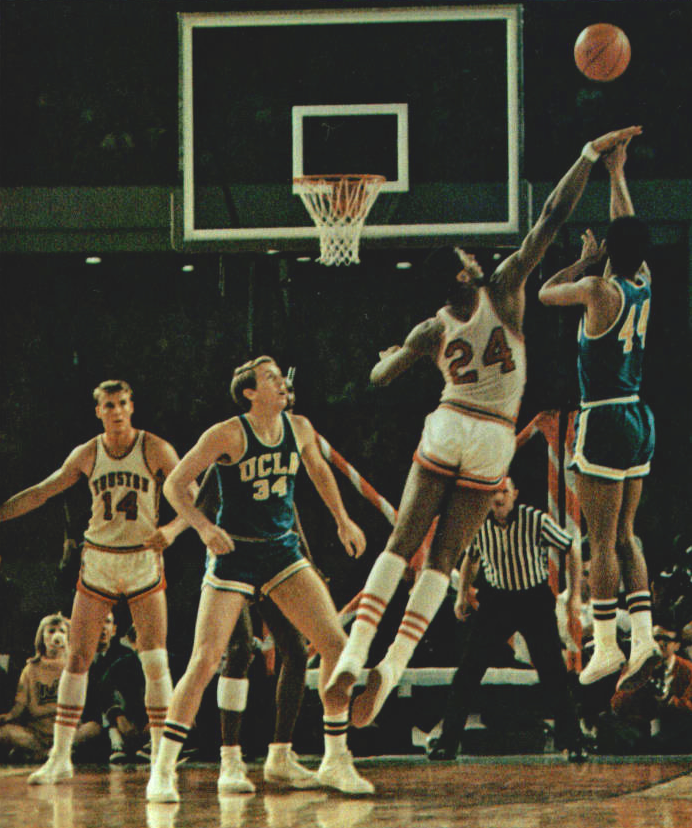
January 20, 1968: Houston Cougars play against UCLA Bruins

- In the first regular-season college basketball game to be shown live on national television, the second-ranked University of Houston Cougars defeated the top-ranked UCLA Bruins, 71 to 69, at the Houston Astrodome. Played inside a domed baseball stadium, the meeting set a record for attendance at a college basketball with 52,693 paying customers (more than 4,000 of whom were standing up because the seats were filled), and was billed as "The Game of the Century". Both teams were unbeaten (UCLA had a 13–0 record and a 47-game winning streak, and Houston had a 16–0 record). Each had a superstar player, with Houston being fronted by Elvin Hayes and UCLA's Lew Alcindor (who would later change his name to Kareem Abdul-Jabbar) having been cleared to play after having to miss two games because of an eye injury. The spectators and viewers watched a thriller that came down to the final minute; Hayes scored 39 points, including two free throws that proved to be the winning points with 0:28 left on the clock; UCLA's chance to send the game into overtime ended when a Bruins player inadvertently tipped the ball out of bounds with 0:12 left.
- In South Vietnam, a defector from the North Vietnamese Army surrendered to U.S. Marines at the Khe Sanh Combat Base and warned them that the NVA was preparing to launch a massive attack there the next day, starting with an assault after midnight against Hill 861 overlooking the area.
- Actress Sharon Tate married film director Roman Polanski at a ceremony in London, a little more than a year before they moved to their home in Los Angeles where she would be murdered by members of the Manson family on August 9, 1969.
- North Vietnam once again denied the Red Cross access to U.S. prisoners who were being held in Hanoi in an attempt to conceal the torture tactics they were utilizing in violation of international law.

== January 21, 1968 (Sunday) ==
- A U.S. B-52 Stratofortress crashed in Greenland, losing its cargo of four Mark 28 nuclear bombs. The disaster happened while the bomber was monitoring the U.S. Air Force's Thule Air Base, flying back and forth at an altitude of 35,000 feet (11,000 m) over the base's early warning system. Four "cloth-covered, foam-rubber cushions" had been placed beneath an uncomfortable seat and were blocking a vent; when the co-pilot switched on a backup heating system that relied on warm air that had been pulled in through the plane's intake manifold, the cushions caught fire. The seven-man crew ejected, and the plane "slammed into the ice of Bylot Sound" near the base. The high-level conventional explosives inside the four thermonuclear weapons exploded on impact, contaminating three square miles of ice with radioactive plutonium. However, because of the "one-point safety" design that had been perfected in the mid-1950s during Project 56, a larger catastrophe was averted. A historian would note later that, "If the Mark 28 hadn't been made inherently one-point safe, the bombs that hit the ice could have produced a nuclear yield. And the partial detonation of a nuclear weapon, or two, or three— without any warning, at the air base considered essential for the defense of the United States— could have been misinterpreted" at the headquarters of the Strategic Air Command.
- Blue House raid: an attack on the Blue House, residence of the President of South Korea in Seoul, was attempted by a 31-member assault team from the 124th Army unit of North Korea's Korean People's Army. The North Korean squad, on a mission to assassinate President Park Chung Hee, came within 800 metres (870 yd) of the Blue House before a firefight ensued with South Korean police. All but one of the commandos was killed, and the survivor would tell investigators that the objective had been to "agitate the South Korean people to fight with arms against their government and the American imperialists." Eight South Koreans were killed in the fight.
- The Battle of Khe Sanh began at 5:30 in the morning as the North Vietnamese Army began shelling a U.S. Marine combat base from positions in South Vietnam and across the border in Laos, while operating under the cover of a morning fog. On the first day, shells destroyed the American base's main ammunition dump, where 98% of its firepower had been stored. The battle would last for 77 days, with the besieged compound being freed in April, but at a cost of 274 U.S. deaths and the diversion of American forces in advance of the Tet Offensive.
- North Vietnamese Army (NVA) General Võ Nguyên Giáp gave the go-ahead orders to NVA and Viet Cong commanders in South Vietnam to begin the Tet Offensive on the eve of the Vietnamese New Year celebration, five days ahead of the original plan, after the Tet holiday ceasefire was shortened.
- The Israeli Labor Party was created by the merger of three other political parties, Prime Minister Levi Eshkol's Mapai; Yitzhak-Meir Levin's Ahdut HaAvoda; and David Ben-Gurion's Rafi.
- Born: Charlotte Ross, American TV actress; in Winnetka, Illinois
- Died: Will Lang Jr., 53, American war correspondent, died of a heart attack while on vacation in Austria.

== January 22, 1968 (Monday) ==
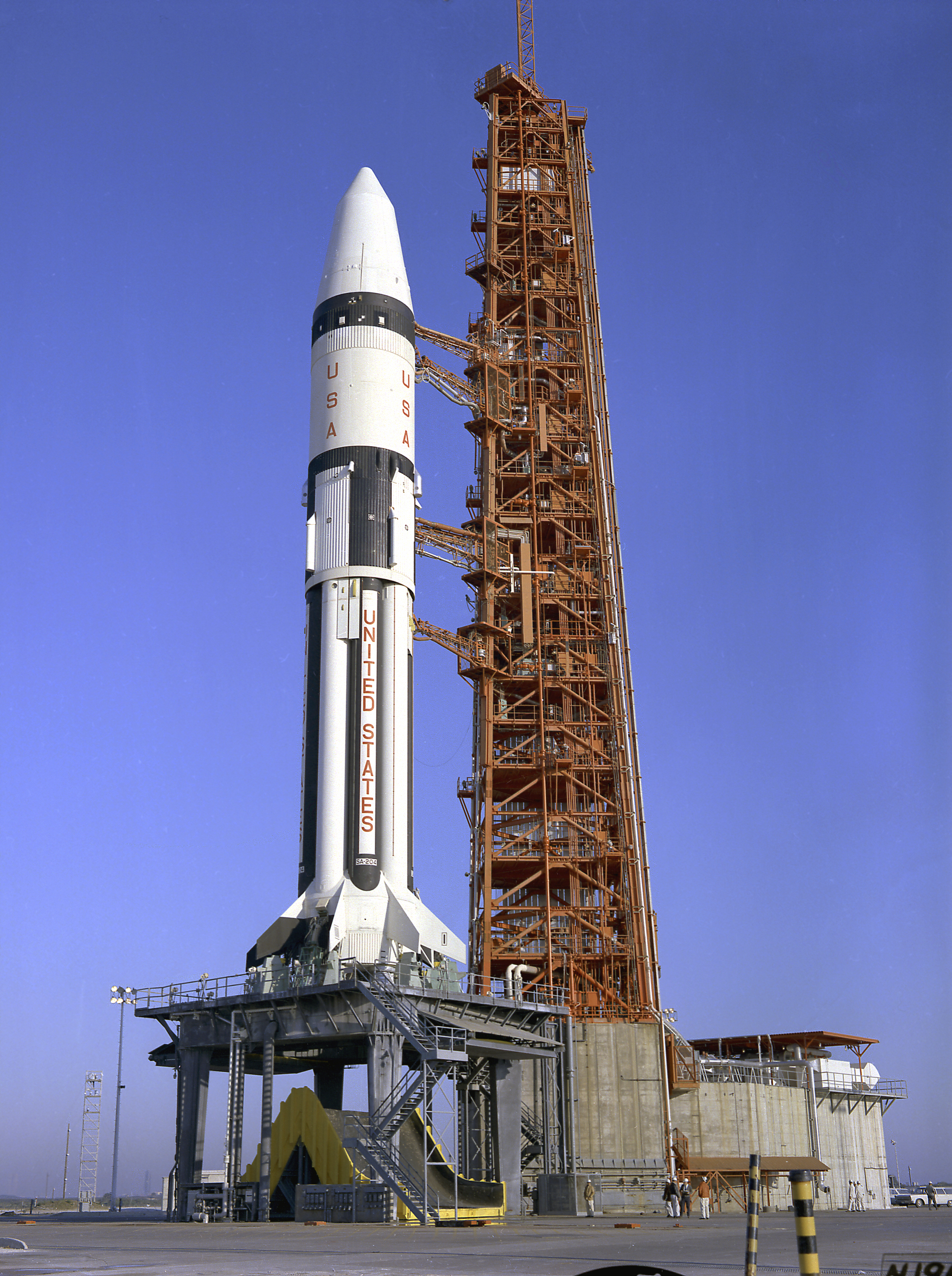
January 22, 1968: Apollo 5's Saturn IB on the launchpad

- Apollo 5 was launched as an unmanned mission to test the Lunar Module (LM-2) that would take two astronauts from orbit to the lunar surface, and then back again for a return to Earth. The LM-2 was loaded (without its landing gear) into the nose cone of a Saturn 1B rocket, and was sent up from Cape Kennedy at 5:48 p.m. local time. After it reached a 138-mile (222 km) orbit, the LM-1 separated from the rocket stage and tests were made of its descent engine (which would guide the astronauts to a soft landing on the Moon) and its ascent engine (which was required not only to return the module to orbit, but also to fire through the descent engine if necessary to abort a failure).
- The deadline in Nigeria for exchanging old Nigerian pound banknotes for newly printed currency expired, and the notes that had circulated since 1958 became worthless. The decision to replace the notes had been made in August after the secession of Biafra as a means of preventing Biafra from trading its holdings of Nigerian pounds on foreign exchanges. In the days leading up to the deadline, tons of the old banknotes were purchased only at a heavy discount. Biafra would introduce its own coins and currency, the Biafran pound, one week later.
- Rowan & Martin's Laugh-In, which would become the number one rated television show in the United States by its second season, was launched as a weekly program on NBC. Hosted by comedians Dan Rowan and Dick Martin, the fast-paced variety show featured a regular cast of comedians including Eileen Brennan, Judy Carne, Henry Gibson, Goldie Hawn, Arte Johnson, and Jo Anne Worley, and introduced a number of catchphrases, including "Sock it to me!" and "Very interesting!".
- Born: Guy Fieri, American chef and TV personality; in Columbus, Ohio
- Died:
  - U.S. Air Force Captain Lance Sijan, 25, died in North Vietnam's Hỏa Lò prison camp from pneumonia, malnutrition and multiple injuries. He had spent 40 days eluding his captors after his F-4C fighter had been shot down over Laos on November 9; he had been captured, had escaped, and had then been recaptured. Captain Sijan would posthumously be awarded the Medal of Honor; his remains would be returned to the United States on March 13, 1974.
  - Duke Kahanamoku, 77, Hawaiian athlete who won gold medals in the 1912 and 1920 Summer Olympic Games, known for popularizing the sport of surfing

== January 23, 1968 (Tuesday) ==
- North Korea seized the USS Pueblo, claiming the ship violated its territorial waters while spying. At 12:27 p.m. local time, a North Korean SO-1 patrol craft approached the American surveillance ship and gave the International Code of Signals flag combination (I)ndia-(D)elta, meaning "Heave to or I will open fire"; Captain Lloyd M. Bucher ordered the Pueblo to signal back that it was in international waters and that it intended to remain at its location until the next day. Three North Korean P-4 torpedo boats then arrived from Wonsan harbor; the SO-1 boat signaled for the Pueblo to follow. At 1:27, the SO-1 fired its guns, and the P-4 shot gunfire as the slower Pueblo attempted to escape. At 1:45, Bucher surrendered the ship. On December 23, following an American apology, the North Koreans would release the 82 members of the Pueblo crew but would keep the American ship, which is now on display in Pyongyang near the "Victorious Fatherland Liberation War Museum".
- The government of the Madras State in southern India became the first to drop a requirement that students learn Hindi, the most commonly spoken language in the nation. Students had the option to take Hindi, but required instruction was in the Tamil language spoken by a majority of people in Madras, which is now called the Tamil Nadu state. The only remaining required language for students in Madras was English.
- Elections were held for Denmark's parliament, the Folketing, bringing down the government of Prime Minister Jens Otto Krag. Krag's Social Democratic Party retained the largest share of the 179 seat Folketing but dropped seven seats to only 62.
- The student strike that had started a week earlier, at Belgium's Catholic University of Leuven, was intensified as other Flemish speakers, and high school students in Flanders walked out of their classrooms.
- Born: Eric Metcalf, American track athlete and NFL running back; in Seattle

== January 24, 1968 (Wednesday) ==
- France made its first test of the experimental Ludion, a jet pack, propelled by isopropyl nitrate and designed to lift a soldier and a small amount of equipment for a short distance. The first test, like all but five of the 64 made of the Ludion before the project was abandoned, was a tethered flight.
- The Western film Firecreek, starring James Stewart and Henry Fonda, debuted in theaters.
- Born: Mary Lou Retton, American gymnast and 1984 Olympic gold medalist; in Fairmont, West Virginia

== January 25, 1968 (Thursday) ==
- The Israeli submarine INS Dakar sank in the Mediterranean on its first voyage since being purchased from the United Kingdom, killing the 69 crew on board. The wreckage would be located more than 30 years later, on May 28, 1999, apparently the victim of a structural failure in one of the torpedo tubes.
- Charlie Wilson, one of the perpetrators of the Great Train Robbery of 1963, was recaptured more than three years after he had escaped from prison on August 12, 1964, when police found him near Montreal in the Canadian town of Rigaud, Quebec. Wilson had been living in Rigaud for two years under the alias "Ronald Alloway". Wilson would be released in 1978 after spending 10 more years imprisoned in England, would retire to Spain, and would be murdered on April 23, 1990, at his home in Marbella in a contract killing.
- I Never Sang for My Father premiered on Broadway. It was a moderate success, running for 124 performances at the Shubert Theatre. It starred Hal Holbrook and Lillian Gish, and would be made into a film in 1970.
- Died: Yvor Winters, 67, American poet

== January 26, 1968 (Friday) ==
- Rioting broke out in the French city of Caen after police broke up a protest march by about 10,000 protesters and striking workers from the Saviem truck factory, "liberally dousing them with tear gas" in an unprovoked attack. Angered, the marchers began throwing rocks and Molotov cocktails and the riot would go through the night until 5:00 the next morning; 100 people were hurt, 36 of them badly enough to be hospitalized, and another 85 were arrested.
- Flying a Lockheed A-12 Blackbird reconnaissance jet at 80,000 feet (24,000 m) over North Korea, CIA pilot Jack Weeks located the missing USS Pueblo, anchored at Wonson. In the same mission, however, Weeks also took photos that showed that North Korea was not massing troops near the demilitarized zone, easing fears of a new Korean War.
- The first Kerala State Lotteries grand prize (and the first government lottery prize ever awarded in India) was drawn at Trivandrum, with the winner receiving 50,000 Indian rupees (equivalent to $6,700 U.S. dollars at the time). Tickets for the first lottery had been sold since November 1.
- Born:
  - Ravi Teja, Indian film star in Telugu cinema ("Tollywood"); in Jaggampeta, Andhra Pradesh
  - Eric Davis, American NFL cornerback; in Anniston, Alabama
  - Novala Takemoto, Japanese fashion designer; in Uji, Kyoto
- Died: Merrill C. Meigs, 84, American journalist and publisher of the Chicago Herald and Examiner

== January 27, 1968 (Saturday) ==
- Two days after the disaster of the Israeli submarine Dakar, the French submarine Minerve sank in the Mediterranean Sea, killing all 52 of its crew. The last contact that the Minerve had made was when it was in the Mediterranean Sea, approaching its home port at Toulon and only 25 miles (40 km) away. At the time, the submarine was 40 feet (12 m) below the surface, in waters 6,000 feet (1,800 m) deep; its hull was not designed to survive pressures at depths greater than 1,000 feet (300 m).
- At midnight Indochina Time, the official Tet holiday ceasefire began in South Vietnam and North Vietnam, in the days leading up to the New Year's Eve celebrations to welcome the start of Mau Than, the Year of the Monkey.
- In the Indian state of Bihar, the government of Chief Minister Mahamaya Prasad Sinha was brought down by a censure motion that passed 163 to 150.
- Born:
  - Tracy Lawrence, American country music singer; in Atlanta, Texas
  - Matt Stover, American football placekicker and the third most accurate kicker in NFL history; in Dallas
  - Mike Patton, American rock music singer for the alternative metal band Faith No More; in Eureka, California
  - Tricky (stage name for Adrian Thaws), British hip hop musician; in Bristol

== January 28, 1968 (Sunday) ==
- Anibal Escalante and 36 other members of Cuba's Communist Party were arrested and charged with being a "microfaction" (La "Microfracción) within Cuba that was working with the Soviet Embassy. In reaction, the Soviets, who provided the support to the Cuban government's programs, "began to establish diplomatic and commercial relations with governments that Cuba had pledge to topple or had denounced", and decreased the amount of oil that it provided to Cuba.
- Born:
  - Rakim (stage name for William Griffin Jr.), American hip hop musician; in Wyandanch, New York
  - Sarah McLachlan, Canadian singer; in Halifax, Nova Scotia

== January 29, 1968 (Monday) ==
- NASA confirmed nomenclature for the Orbital Workshop (OWS) included in the AAP presented in the FY 1969 budget. The ground-outfitted OWS to be launched with Saturn V would be designated the "Saturn V Workshop". (This had sometimes been called the "dry workshop".) The OWS that would be launched by a Saturn IB would be referred to as the "Saturn I Workshop". (Colloquially it had been referred to as the "wet workshop".) Terminology "Uprated Saturn I" would not be used officially. This launch vehicle would be referred to as the "Saturn IB".
- Born:
  - Aeneas Williams, American NFL cornerback; in New Orleans
  - Edward Burns, American actor and director; in Queens
- Died: L. P. Jai, 65, Indian test cricket star

== January 30, 1968 (Tuesday) ==
- The Tet Offensive, a turning point in the Vietnam War, began as Viet Cong forces launched a series of surprise attacks across South Vietnam, beginning with an assault at 15 minutes after midnight on the Nha Trang Air Base and the headquarters of the U.S. Army's I Field Force. Attacks followed next at I Corps and II Corps bases at Ban Mê Thuột, Kon Tum, Hội An, Tuy Hòa, Da Nang, Qui Nhơn, and Pleiku. The North Vietnamese Army plan was for the operation to begin on January 31, and Viet Cong forces in the South started prematurely.
- Ford's Theatre, located at 511 10th St, NW in Washington, D.C., held its first entertainment program since April 14, 1865, when the comedy Our American Cousin had been interrupted by the assassination of U.S. President Abraham Lincoln. For the reopening, Henry Fonda, Harry Belafonte, Helen Hayes, and Andy Williams were among the performers on stage in an evening of music and dancing. Television viewers were able to watch a videotaped performance that night at 10:00 p.m. Eastern time, titled Inaugural Evening at Ford's Theater.
- Assistant Postmaster General Richard Murphy ruled that hippies could continue to work for the United States Postal Service "but they must have neat haircuts and get rid of their beards and sandals" and wear proper attire; according to Murphy, the largest number of hippies worked at post offices in San Francisco and some had been "walking their routes barefooted with shaggy beards, hair down to their shoulders, and wearing everything from bearskin coats to dungarees."
- Born: King Felipe VI of Spain, King of Spain since 2014; in Madrid
- Died:
  - Pete Calac, 75, Native American Indian NFL player from the Mission Indians tribe of California who played for five NFL teams during the 1920s, including the Oorang Indians.
  - Robert Wood Johnson II, 74, American businessman who built the Johnson & Johnson Company into one of the world's largest health care suppliers.

== January 31, 1968 (Wednesday) ==
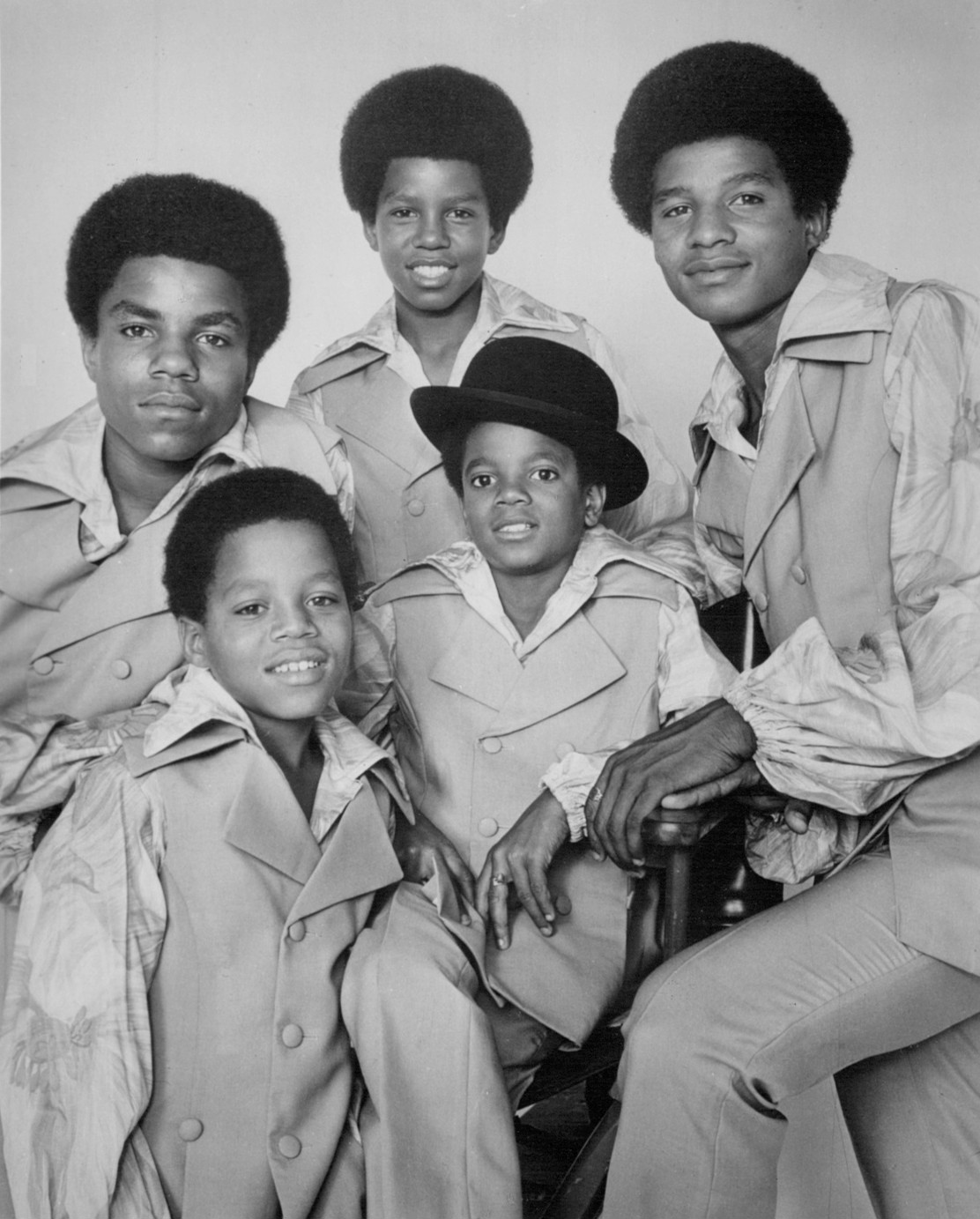
The Jackson 5

- The Jackson 5, an unknown family band at the time, released their debut single "Big Boy" by Steeltown Records. Despite the song being neither a critical or commercial success, the Jackson family were delighted when the song became a local hit after being played on radio stations in the Chicago-Gary area. On July 26, the Jackson 5 would leave Steeltown after signing with Motown Records.
- At 2:45 in the morning, a truck and a taxi cab pulled out of a repair shop near the U.S. Embassy in Saigon and drove to the Embassy compound. At 3:00, fifteen commandos set up explosives and blew a large hole in the compound's wall, then scrambled through and killed the two U.S. military police guarding the six-story embassy building. Antitank guns and rockets were fired at the doors, and U.S. Ambassador Ellsworth Bunker was awakened and taken to a secret hiding place. U.S. Army soldiers counterattacked and retook the compound by 9:15; fortunately, the embassy had been fortified less than a year earlier at a cost of $2,600,000 to put in shatterproof windows and the thick, 8-foot tall wall.
- After some sporadic attacks on bases the day before, the Tet Offensive was unleashed on nearly all of South Vietnam's military bases and major cities simultaneously, with the Viet Cong and the North Vietnamese Army coordinating a massive assault that was larger than U.S. intelligence had forecast. An estimated 84,000 troops had infiltrated provincial and district capitals and took advantage of the Tet holiday ceasefire to strike in what would become the turning point of the Vietnam War. More American soldiers would be killed in action during that day than on any other day of the Vietnam War, with 245 deaths of people whose names are etched upon the Vietnam Veterans Memorial.
- The 1,000 guerrillas who had infiltrated Saigon also seized the government radio station and surrounded, but did not capture, the presidential palace. The old imperial capital at Huế was taken over by 3:40 in the morning and more than 2,000 residents would be executed over the next three weeks; another 6,000 would be killed in the bombing and shelling of the city in the American counterattack, which would destroy 18,000 of Hue's 20,000 houses. In all, 36 of the 44 provincial capitals and 64 of the 245 district government seats were attacked; one of the capitals, Bến Tre, was virtually destroyed in the process of being taken over and recaptured.
- Television broadcasting was introduced to the nation of Turkey, with test transmissions for the national network Türkiye Radyo Televizyon Kurumu (TRT, the Turkish Radio and Television Corporation).
- The small island nation of Nauru, with a population of 5,560 people (2,734 of whom were natives) was granted independence from Australia, with Hammer DeRoburt as its first President.
