= Montevago =

- Comune
- Comune di Montevago
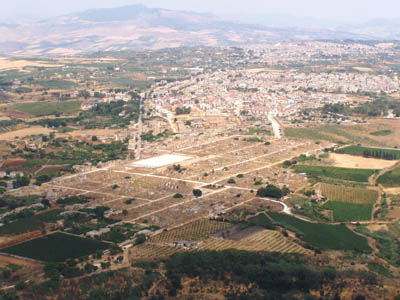
- View of Montevago

- Coat of arms

- Location within Italy Location within Sicily
- Coordinates: 37°42′12″N 12°59′12″E
- Country: Italy
- Region: Sicily
- Province: Agrigento (AG)

Government
  - Mayor: Margherita La Rocca Ruvolo

Area
  - Total: 32.91 km^{2} (12.71 sq mi)
- Elevation: 380 m (1,250 ft)

Population (30 November 2017)
  - Total: 2,953
  - Density: 89.73/km^{2} (232.4/sq mi)
- Demonym: Montevaghesi
- Time zone: UTC+1 (CET)
  - Summer (DST): UTC+2 (CEST)
- Postal code: 92010
- Dialing code: 0925
- Patron saint: St. Dominic
- Saint day: August 8
- Website: Official website

Montevago (Sicilian: Muntivau) is a comune (municipality) in the Province of Agrigento in the Italian region Sicily, located about 60 kilometres (37 miles) southwest of Palermo and about 70 kilometres (43 miles) northwest of Agrigento. The town is known for its sulphurous spring, which gave rise to the Terme Acqua Pia and is linked to the legend of Cinzio and Corinzia.

Montevago borders the following municipalities: Castelvetrano, Menfi, Partanna, Salaparuta, Santa Margherita di Belice.

== History ==
Since the earliest periods, the area has been a place of human settlement, as attested by numerous archaeological finds.

The Battle of the Crimissus (341 BC) — fought between the Greek army led by Timoleon and the Carthaginian army led by Hamilcar and Hasdrubal, and recorded by Plutarch and Diodorus — is thought to have taken place along what is now the left branch of the Belice river. This hypothesis is supported by the area's topography as well as by descriptions in historical sources: from the plateau of Montevago, where Timoleon is believed to have camped, the river valley could easily be reached. In the district of Saccafena there is a hillock known as coddu di lu Grecu ("the Greek's hill"), from which the valley could be observed, and which is thought to have served as Timoleon's lookout during the battle. In support of this location, numerous graves containing skeletons and grave goods typical of warriors of the period have been found in the district of "Serra di li Fossa".

In 827 AD, a Muslim army led by Asad landed in Sicily and defeated the Byzantine army under General Palata. After the conquest, farmsteads (casali) and villages grew up in the area; these are still mentioned in documents from the Norman period recording urban settlements, including Rabl al-Balat near Calatrasi, the casale of Belich, and Mazil Sindi — later known as Miserindino, which from the 14th century gave its name to the barony of the same name.

The fief of Miserindino, with its castle, was granted to Antonio Moncada, Count of Adernò, by King Martin I of Sicily in 1392. It later passed to Enrico Rosso and, in 1433, was sold to the Corbera family and then to the Filangeri family. The barony of Miserindino comprised the three fiefs of Adrigna, Serafino and Gipponeri, purchased in January 1636 by Girolama Xirotta. At the time, no new settlement could be founded without a special licence from the sovereign; Girolama Xirotta requested and obtained the right to populate the fief of Gipponeri, naming the settlement to be built there Montevago. Rutilio Xirotta, Marquess of Santa Elisabetta, obtained — for himself and his heirs — the title of Prince of Montevago, under a privilege granted in Madrid.

Along with the construction of the Xirotta family's baronial residence and the nearby Church of San Francesco (the original mother church of Montevago), the settlement's first urban nucleus developed according to a rational, orthogonal street plan. Residents of the neighbouring towns of Santa Margherita di Belice, Sambuca di Sicilia, Poggioreale and Partanna took part in founding this first nucleus.

On 17 February 1655, Rutilio Xirotta took investiture of the three fiefs of Adrigna, Serafino and Gipponeri, which together formed the state of Montevago; he later married Eleonora Gravina Migliaccio, with whom he had two children, Saverio and Girolama. After his death in 1666, his son Saverio took investiture but died young, two years later, and on 17 December 1688 investiture passed to his sister Girolama, who in 1681 had married Giovanni Gravina Requesenz, Duke of San Michele. The state of Montevago thus passed to the Gravina family, whose members combined the title of Duke of San Michele with those of Marquess of Santa Elisabetta and Prince of Montevago.

By the end of the 17th century, after the Gravina family had succeeded the Xirotta, the town had grown considerably: the population stood at 971, the first districts of San Francesco and della Concezione had appeared, and in 1714 the Università di Montevago — the town's local public administration — was established.

In 1740, Girolama Xirotta was succeeded by her son Girolamo, and by around the middle of the 18th century Montevago's urban layout had reached what was essentially its final form: a strictly orthogonal street plan — the Hispano-Moorish building system then in use — creating a series of rectangular blocks, each comprising several dwellings arranged around large internal courtyards known as patii, where residents carried out craft and household activities. There was also a large square, known as "piano della Matrice", overlooked by the cathedral built between the 17th and 19th centuries by the Gravina family and dedicated to the apostles Peter and Paul.

On the night of 14–15 January 1968, the municipality was struck by the 1968 Belice earthquake. Broadcaster Sergio Zavoli devoted a report, "il vicebrigadiere di Montevago" ("the deputy brigadier of Montevago"), to the destruction the earthquake caused in the town.

=== Coat of arms and banner ===
The coat of arms of the municipality of Montevago was granted by royal decree on 24 February 1938. It consists of a gold eagle holding in its talons a small red shield bearing a white cross, standing on a green plain with two large mountains in the background.

The civic banner (gonfalone), granted by decree of the President of the Republic on 4 November 2003, consists of a cloth divided per pale in red and white.

== Landmarks ==
=== The Mother Church ===
The monumental cathedral of Montevago, built on the site of the former Church of the Holy Crucifix (or of Purgatory) dedicated to the apostles Peter and Paul, was begun in the late 1700s/early 1800s at the wish of Prince Giovanni Gravina Moncada and continued by Cardinal Pietro Gravina until 1820, when it was consecrated. The church was destroyed in the 1968 earthquake.

Pietro Gravina — born in Montevago on 16 December 1749 and died in Palermo on 6 December 1830, son of Giovanni (third Prince of Montevago) and Eleonora Napoli — began his studies with the Theatines in Palermo before continuing at the Collegio Clementino in Rome. Appointed Archbishop of Nicaea on 12 September 1794 by Pope Pius VI, he served as apostolic nuncio to Lucerne and, from 1802, to Madrid. At the consistory of 8 March 1816, Pope Pius VII elevated him to cardinal and, that same year, appointed him Archbishop of Palermo. In 1820 he was appointed president of the public security council and, during the Sicilian revolution of 1848, served as lieutenant general. He is buried in the Chapel of the Immaculate Conception in Palermo Cathedral; a portrait of him once hung above his mausoleum in Montevago's cathedral, and a copy is displayed in the Viceroy's Hall of the Palazzo dei Normanni in Palermo.

The architect of the church was Emmanuele Palazzotto of Palermo, who later designed the neo-Gothic bell towers of Palermo Cathedral from 1826 onward, again at Cardinal Pietro Gravina's request.

The cathedral's façade had a neoclassical profile, built in exposed tuff, arranged in two superimposed orders separated by a broad entablature. The lower order was divided vertically by pilasters — sometimes paired, sometimes single — framing doorways topped with triangular pediments: the central, slightly projecting bay held a large door beneath a triangular pediment set within a round arch, while the side bays held smaller double doors (the outermost pair blind) topped with windows and triangular pediments.

== Society ==
=== Traditions and folklore ===
- The patron saint of Montevago is St. Dominic, celebrated on 8 August.
- On 2 July, the feast of the Madonna delle Grazie is widely celebrated in front of the sanctuary dedicated to her, which also houses a friary.

== Administration ==
Name	Term start	Term end	Party	Notes
Biagio Migliore	7 February 1988	22 May 1990	Italian Socialist Party	
Giovanni Bavetta	22 May 1990	13 January 1992	Italian Socialist Party	
Calogero Migliore	13 January 1992	7 June 1993	Christian Democracy	
Bernardo Triolo	12 June 1993	10 February 1994	Democratic Party of the Left	
Girolamo Barrile	27 June 1994	25 May 1998	—	
Domenico Barrile	25 May 1998	25 July 2000	Democratic Party of the Left	
Paolo Barone	25 July 2000	27 November 2000	(special commissioner)	
Calogero Impastato	27 November 2000	13 June 2006	Civic list	
Antonino Barrile	13 June 2006	31 May 2011	Democrats of the Left	
Calogero Impastato	31 May 2011	5 June 2016	—	
Margherita La Rocca Ruvolo	5 June 2016	11 October 2021	Civic list	
Margherita La Rocca Ruvolo	12 October 2021	incumbent	Civic list	

=== Other administrative information ===
The municipality of Montevago is part of agrarian region no. 2 (Colline del Carboj).

== Twinnings ==
- Piešťany, Slovakia
- Tekirdağ, Turkey

== See also ==
- 1968 Belice earthquake
