= Biagio Varisco =

Italian-born American agriculturalist and developer (1902–1970)

- Born: October 12, 1902; Poggioreale, Trapani, Italy
- Died: July 25, 1970 (aged 67); Bryan, Texas, US
- Occupations: Agriculturalist, developer
- Children: 2

Biagio "Brazos" Varisco (October 12, 1902 – July 25, 1970) was an Italian-born American agriculturalist and developer.

== Biography ==
Varisco was born on October 12, 1902, in Poggioreale, Trapani, to Antonio and Dorotea Varisco (née Tritico). They moved to Bryan, Texas, in 1907, later buying 3,100 acres of land. Using 2,300 acres, he, his father and brother Giuseppe began farming cotton, producing 2,000 bales per year. In 1924, he married Lucille Scardino, having 2 children together. Using the money from farming, he ordered the construction of the Varisco Building in 1948, as well as buying other buildings. He also served as director of the Bryan Chamber of Commerce. He died on July 25, 1970, aged 67, in Bryan. Varisco, Texas is named for him.
