= Varisco, Texas =

- Ghost town
- Location within Texas Location within the United States
- Coordinates: 30°38′33″N 96°32′34″W
- Country: United States
- State: Texas
- County: Brazos
- Elevation: 249 ft (76 m)
- Time zone: UTC-6 (Central (CST))
  - Summer (DST): UTC-5 (CDT)
- Area code: 979
- GNIS feature ID: 1380710

Varisco is a ghost town in Brazos County, in the U.S. state of Texas. It is located within the Bryan-College Station metropolitan area.

== History ==
Varisco was named for Biagio Varisco; until sometime prior to 1986, the town had an airport.

== Geography ==
Varisco was located on Farm to Market Road 50 on the Southern Pacific Railroad in western Brazos County.

== Education ==
Today, Varisco is located within the Bryan Independent School District.
