= Belice =

River in Italy

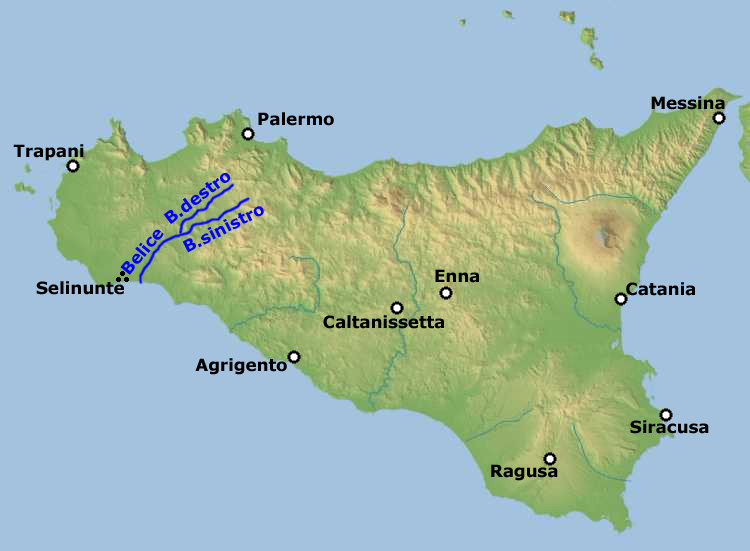
- Native name: Bilici (Sicilian)

Location
- Country: Italy
- Region: Sicily

Physical characteristics
- Source
  - location: near Piana degli Albanesi
- Mouth: Strait of Sicily, Mediterranean Sea
  - location: Castelvetrano
  - coordinates: 37.5825°N 12.8658°E
- Length: 77 km (48 mi)
- Basin size: 866 km^{2} (334 sq mi)

The Belice (Italian: [beˈliːtʃe]; Sicilian: Bilici; Ancient Greek: Ὕψᾱς, romanized: Hýpsās) is a river of western Sicily, Italy. It is about 77 kilometres (48 mi) long. From its main source near Piana degli Albanesi it runs south and west for 45.5 kilometres (28.3 mi) as the Belice Destro ('Right Belice') until it is joined near Poggioreale by its secondary branch, the 42-kilometre (26 mi) Belice Sinistro ('Left Belice'), which rises on the slopes of Rocca Busambra. The Belice proper then flows for another 30 kilometres (19 mi) or so before entering the Strait of Sicily to the east of the ancient Greek archaeological site of Selinunte.

The middle section of the Belice valley was hit by the January 1968 Belice earthquake which completely destroyed numerous centres of population, including Gibellina, Montevago and Salaparuta. Three hundred and seventy people died, a thousand were injured and some 70,000 people were made homeless.
