= The Virgin and Child Surrounded by the Holy Innocents =

1616 painting by Peter Paul Rubens

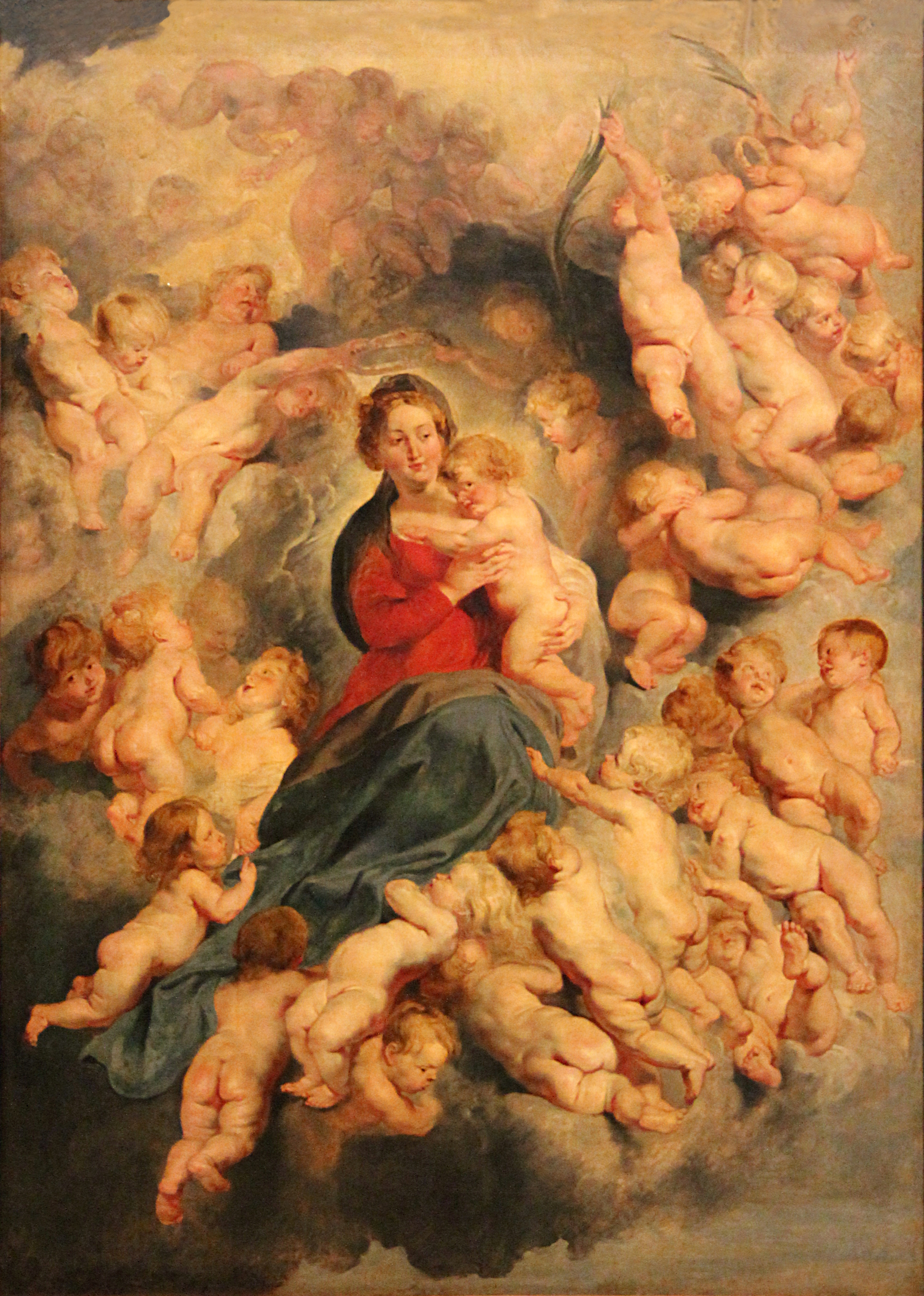
- The Virgin and Child surrounded by the Holy Innocents (1616) by Rubens
- Artist: Peter Paul Rubens
- Year: 1616 (410 years ago)
- Medium: oil paint
- Subject: Madonna and Child and Holy Innocents

The Virgin and Child surrounded by the Holy Innocents or The Virgin and Child with Angels is a 1616 oil painting by Peter Paul Rubens, showing the Virgin and Christ Child with the Holy Innocents. It was originally produced as oil on panel, before being transferred to canvas. In 1671 it was acquired from a Monsieur de la Feuille by Louis XIV and is now in the Louvre Museum.

On 8 January 1968 the painting was carved into with a knife by a presumed mentally deranged man in the Louvre Museum.
