= Salaparuta =

- Comune
- Comune di Salaparuta
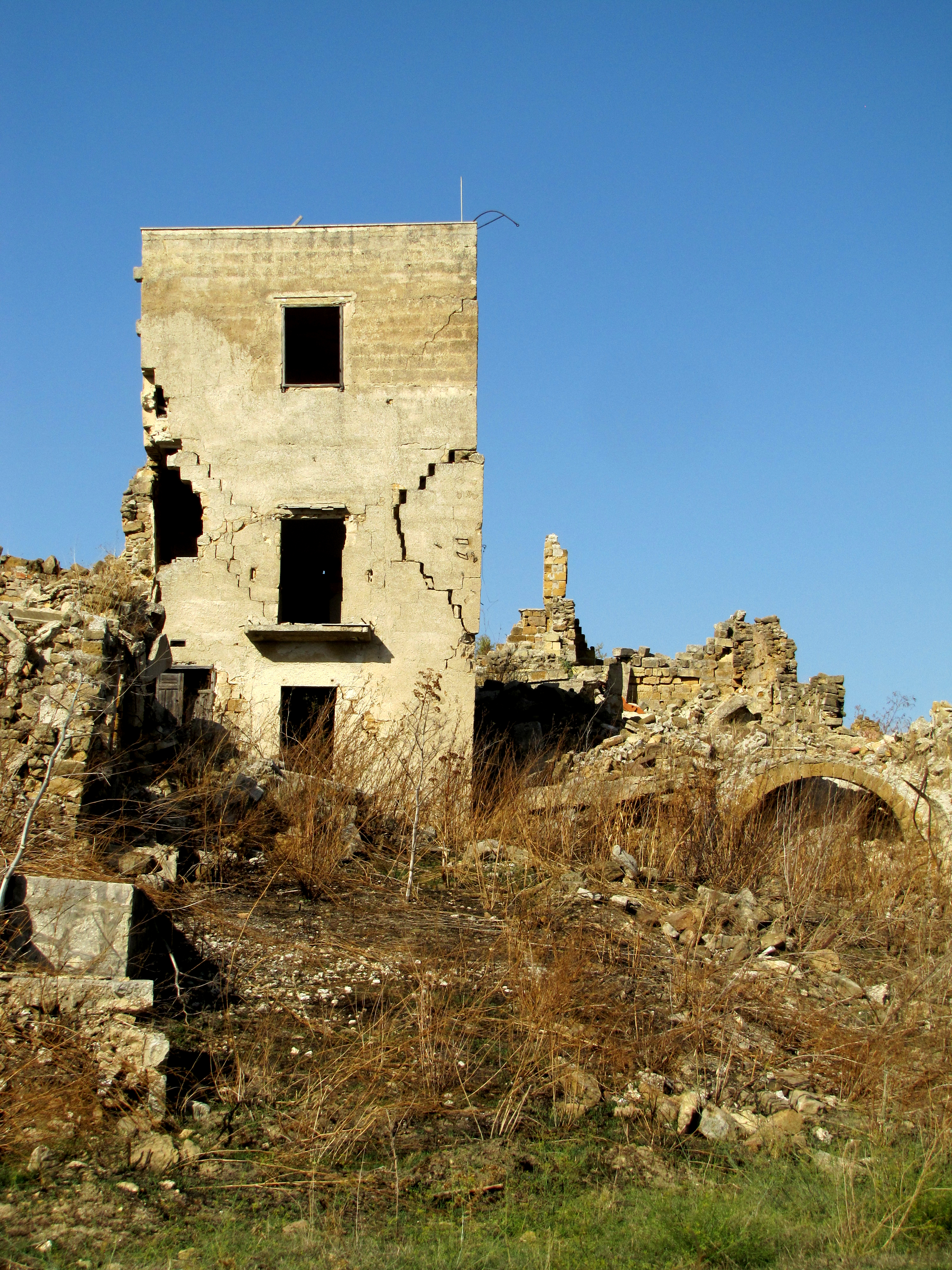
- Destroyed house in old Salaparuta

- Coat of arms

- Location within Italy Location within Sicily
- Coordinates: 37.7586°N 13.0104°E
- Country: Italy
- Region: Sicily
- Province: Trapani (TP)

Government
  - Mayor: Michele Saitta

Area
  - Total: 41.42 km^{2} (15.99 sq mi)
- Elevation: 171 m (561 ft)

Population (2026)
  - Total: 1,560
  - Density: 37.7/km^{2} (97.5/sq mi)
- Demonym: Salitani
- Time zone: UTC+1 (CET)
  - Summer (DST): UTC+2 (CEST)
- Postal code: 91020
- Dialing code: 0924
- Patron saint: St. Joseph
- Saint day: 19 March
- Website: Official website

Salaparuta is a town and comune (municipality) in the province of Trapani in the autonomous island region of Sicily in Italy, in the valley of the Belice river. It has 1,560 inhabitants.

In 1968, the original site of the town was near the epicentre of the Belice Valley earthquake. As a result, Salaparuta was completely destroyed and a new town was rebuilt not far from the original location. The current Salaparuta is still home to many of the residents of the old town.

== Demographics ==
As of 2026, the population is 1,560, of which 49.1% are male, and 50.9% are female. Minors make up 15.1% of the population, and seniors make up 25.7%.

Historical population

Year	Pop.	±%
1861	3,555	—
1871	3,511	−1.2%
1881	4,130	+17.6%
1901	4,016	−2.8%
1911	3,015	−24.9%
1921	3,157	+4.7%
1931	3,214	+1.8%
1936	3,152	−1.9%

Year	Pop.	±%
1951	3,243	+2.9%
1961	2,943	−9.3%
1971	2,048	−30.4%
1981	1,986	−3.0%
1991	1,889	−4.9%
2001	1,835	−2.9%
2011	1,721	−6.2%
2021	1,595	−7.3%

Source: ISTAT

=== Immigration ===
As of 2025, immigrants make up 8.2% of the population. The 5 largest foreign countries of birth are Tunisia, Romania, Morocco, Guinea, and Switzerland.

== Economy ==
Salaparuta is popularly known for its Salaparuta DOC wine production, also the main income source for the town.

== Notable people ==
Salaparuta was home to the father of the famous Italian-American jazz singer and trumpet player, Louis Prima, as well as to the father of Nick LaRocca, a prominent figure in early jazz history.
