= Poggioreale, Trapani =

Poggioreale
- Comune
- Comune di Poggioreale
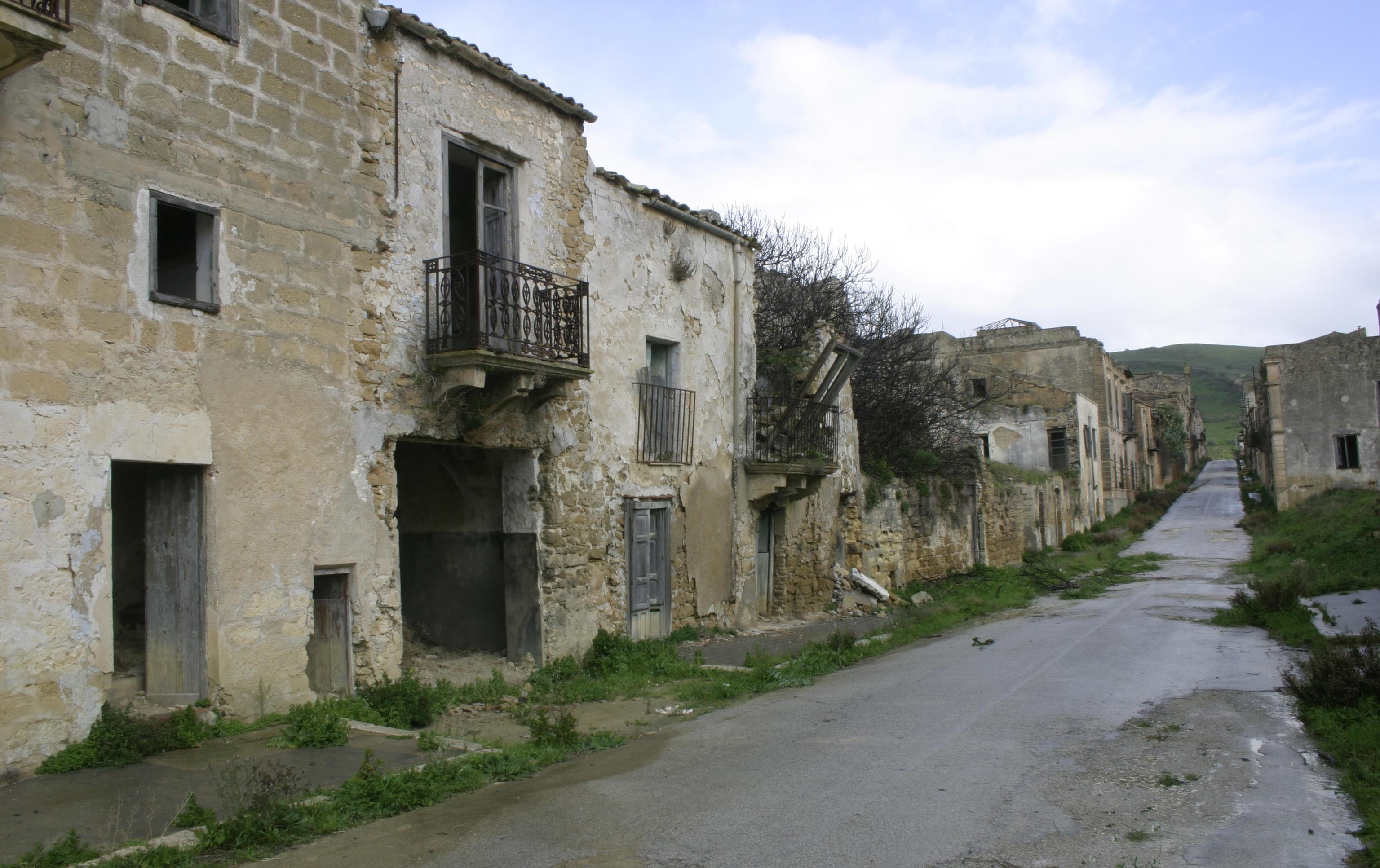
- Derelict buildings in old Poggioreale

- Coat of arms

- Location within Italy Location within Sicily
- Coordinates: 37°46′N 13°2′E
- Country: Italy
- Region: Sicily
- Province: Trapani (TP)

Government
  - Mayor: Girolamo Cangelos

Area
  - Total: 37.46 km^{2} (14.46 sq mi)
- Elevation: 189 m (620 ft)

Population (2026)
  - Total: 1,272
  - Density: 33.96/km^{2} (87.95/sq mi)
- Demonym: Poggiorealesi
- Time zone: UTC+1 (CET)
  - Summer (DST): UTC+2 (CEST)
- Postal code: 91020
- Dialing code: 0924
- Patron saint: Saint Anthony of Padua
- Saint day: June 13
- Website: Official website (in Italian)

Poggioreale (Sicilian: Poggiuriali) is a town and comune (municipality) in the Province of Trapani in the autonomous island region of Sicily in southern Italy, located in the Belice valley. It has 1,272 inhabitants.

The old town's economy was mostly based on agriculture and fruit cultivation. In 1968, the Belice Valley earthquake destroyed the entire town of Poggioreale and killed 200 people. The town was eventually rebuilt in a safer place a few kilometers south.

== Demographics ==
As of 2026, the population is 1,272, of which 49.7% are male, and 50.3% are female. Minors make up 11.0% of the population, and seniors make up 31.1%.

Historical population

| Year | Pop. | ±% |
|---|---|---|
| 1861 | 3,338 | — |
| 1871 | 3,254 | −2.5% |
| 1881 | 3,468 | +6.6% |
| 1901 | 3,218 | −7.2% |
| 1911 | 3,074 | −4.5% |
| 1921 | 2,703 | −12.1% |
| 1931 | 2,902 | +7.4% |
| 1936 | 3,025 | +4.2% |

| Year | Pop. | ±% |
|---|---|---|
| 1951 | 3,349 | +10.7% |
| 1961 | 2,698 | −19.4% |
| 1971 | 1,926 | −28.6% |
| 1981 | 1,908 | −0.9% |
| 1991 | 1,822 | −4.5% |
| 2001 | 1,715 | −5.9% |
| 2011 | 1,534 | −10.6% |
| 2021 | 1,353 | −11.8% |

Source: ISTAT

=== Immigration ===
As of 2025, immigrants make up 6.6% of the total population. The 5 largest foreign countries of birth are Morocco, Romania, Australia, Venezuela, and Argentina.

== Notable people ==
- Biagio Varisco (1902–1970), agriculturalist and developer
