= Santa Ninfa =

- Comune
- Comune di Santa Ninfa
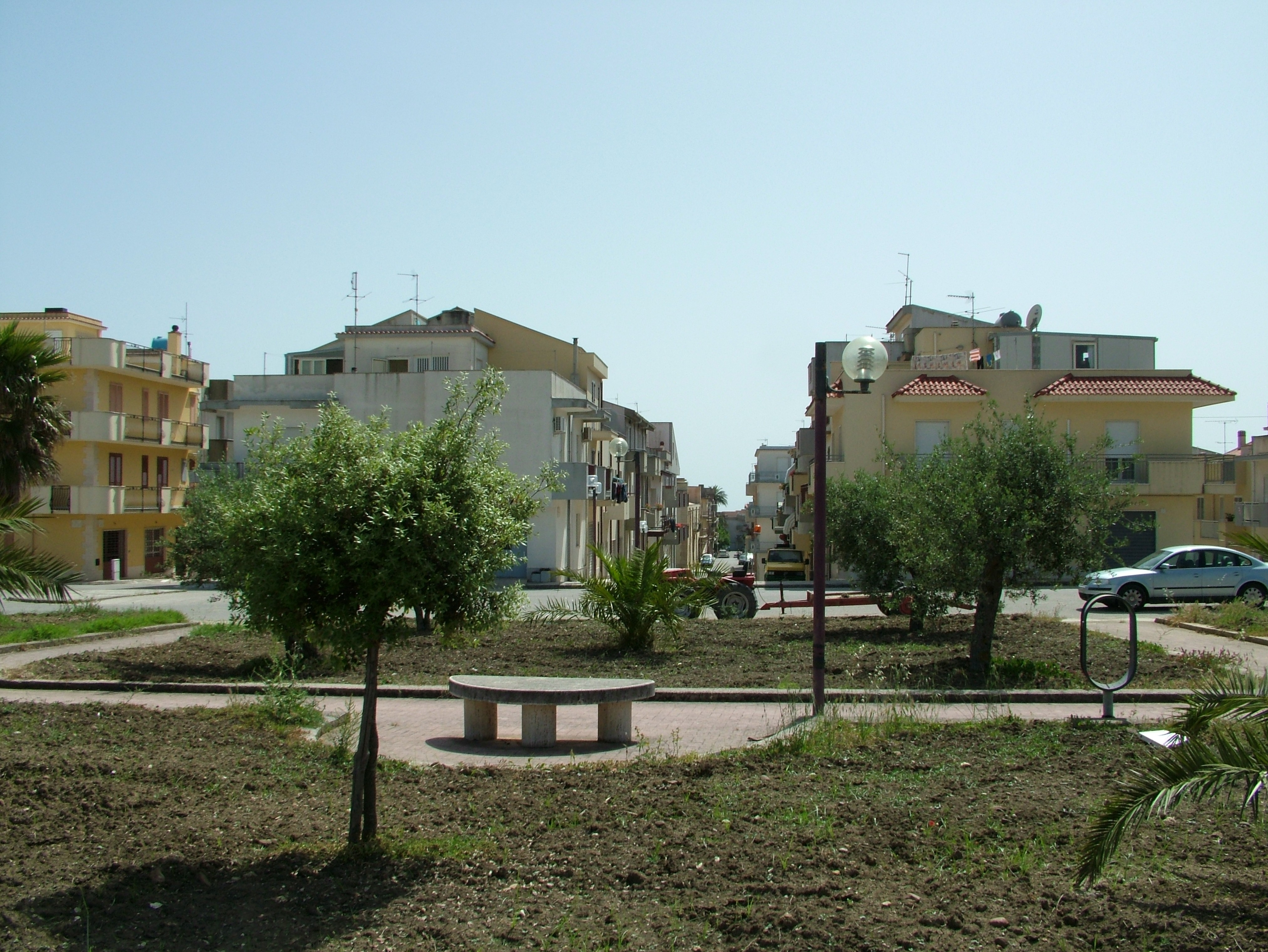

- Location within Italy Location within Sicily
- Coordinates: 37°46′N 12°53′E
- Country: Italy
- Region: Sicily
- Province: Trapani (TP)

Government
  - Mayor: Giuseppe Lombardino

Area
  - Total: 60.943 km^{2} (23.530 sq mi)
- Elevation: 464 m (1,522 ft)

Population (28 February 2017)
  - Total: 5,006
  - Density: 82.14/km^{2} (212.7/sq mi)
- Demonym: Santaninfensi
- Time zone: UTC+1 (CET)
  - Summer (DST): UTC+2 (CEST)
- Postal code: 91029
- Dialing code: 0924
- Website: Official website

Santa Ninfa is a town and comune in the province of Trapani, Sicily, southern Italy.

== History ==
Santa Ninfa was founded in 1605 by Luigi Arias Giardina who, with approval of King Philip III of Spain, began to urbanize the country with roads and civil and religious buildings. The town is dedicated to a putative saint, venerated also in Palermo, Santa Ninfa or Nympha

The town was built with concentric roads that converge in the central square (Liberty Square). Over the years, buildings were built such as the Baronial Palace (Palazzo Baronale), the Hospital, the Church of St. Ursula, St. Anne's Church and the Convent of the Third Order of St. Francis, the Mother Church (Chiesa Madre which is the Cathedral of the country) and the prisons.

In 1615, after the founding of the Arcipretura of Santa Ninfa, the country was declared a baronial fief. From that moment on, and in the following centuries, the estate passed from family to family, enriching the country with more and more new buildings.

Santa Ninfa experienced a large emigration since the early 20th century: many inhabitants of the land left the country for the United States of America, Canada and Venezuela.

== Belice earthquake ==
On January 15, 1968 the country of Santa Ninfa was hit by the disastrous earthquake of Belice. The quake was of the 9th grade on the Mercalli's Intensity Scale, and caused collapses in the entire country.
