= Bivona =

- Comune
- Comune di Bivona
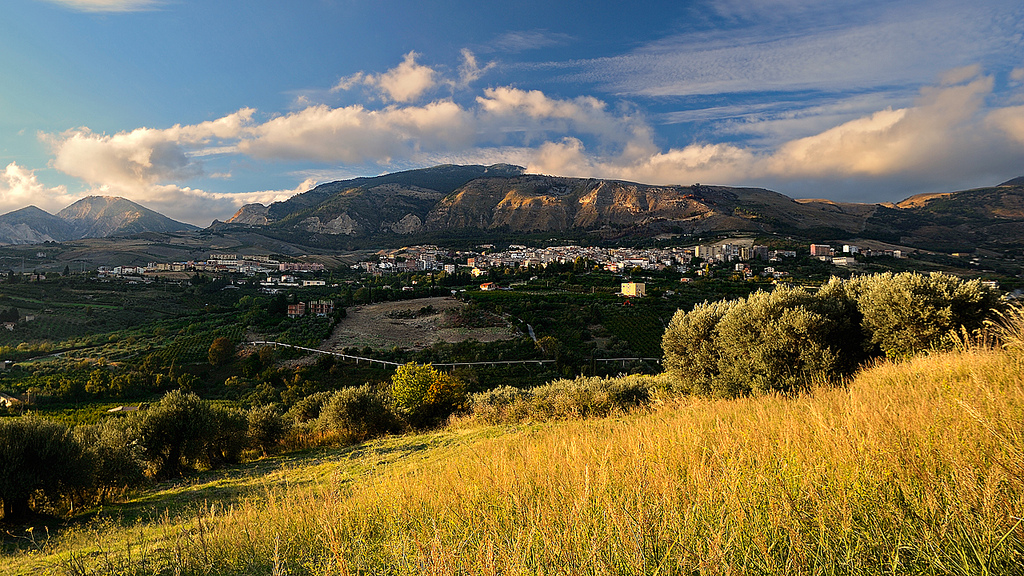
- Panoramic view of Bivona

- Flag Coat of arms

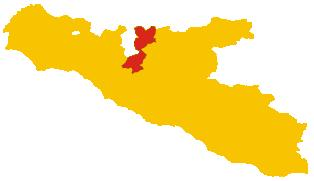
- Bivona in the Province of Agrigento

- Location within Italy Location within Sicily
- Coordinates: 37°37′13″N 13°26′26″E
- Country: Italy
- Region: Sicily
- Province: Agrigento (AG)
- Frazioni: Santa Filomena, Bacino di Barico

Government
  - Mayor: Milko Cinà

Area
  - Total: 88.57 km^{2} (34.20 sq mi)
- Elevation: 503 m (1,650 ft)

Population (30 April 2025)
  - Total: 3,027
  - Density: 34.18/km^{2} (88.52/sq mi)
- Demonym: Bivonesi
- Time zone: UTC+1 (CET)
  - Summer (DST): UTC+2 (CEST)
- Postal code: 92010
- Dialing code: 0922
- Patron saint: Saint Rosalia
- Saint day: 4 September
- Website: Official website
Additional information
- Neighboring municipalities: Alessandria della Rocca, Calamonaci, Castronovo di Sicilia (PA), Cianciana, Lucca Sicula, Palazzo Adriano (PA), Ribera, Santo Stefano Quisquina
- Seismic classification: Zone 2 (medium seismicity)
- Climate classification: Zone C, 1,268 DD

Bivona (IPA: Italian pronunciation: [/biˈvo.na/]; Vivona in Sicilian) is an Italian comune with 3,027 inhabitants in the Free Municipal Consortium of Agrigento in Sicily.

Nestled amidst the Sicani Mountains, where it once served, alongside neighboring Palazzo Adriano, as the official seat of the regional park, Bivona is renowned for cultivating the Bivona Peach, which earned the PGI designation in 2014, and for crafting a distinctive artisanal chair.

Likely originating as a settlement during the Islamic period, Bivona is first documented in the Norman era. It hosted a Jewish community, traces of which remain in the sparse remnants of a synagogue and in local folklore. Between the 15th and 16th centuries, it was a prominent feudal center in the Vallo di Mazara. In 1554, Charles V elevated it to a duchy, the first in the Kingdom of Sicily, while also granting it the title of city. The town was home to numerous religious orders and institutions, including the Jesuit college endorsed by Ignatius of Loyola, as evidenced by the many sacred buildings concentrated in its medieval historic center. Bivona is also noted for one of the earliest documented cults of Saint Rosalia.

== Geography ==
=== Territory ===
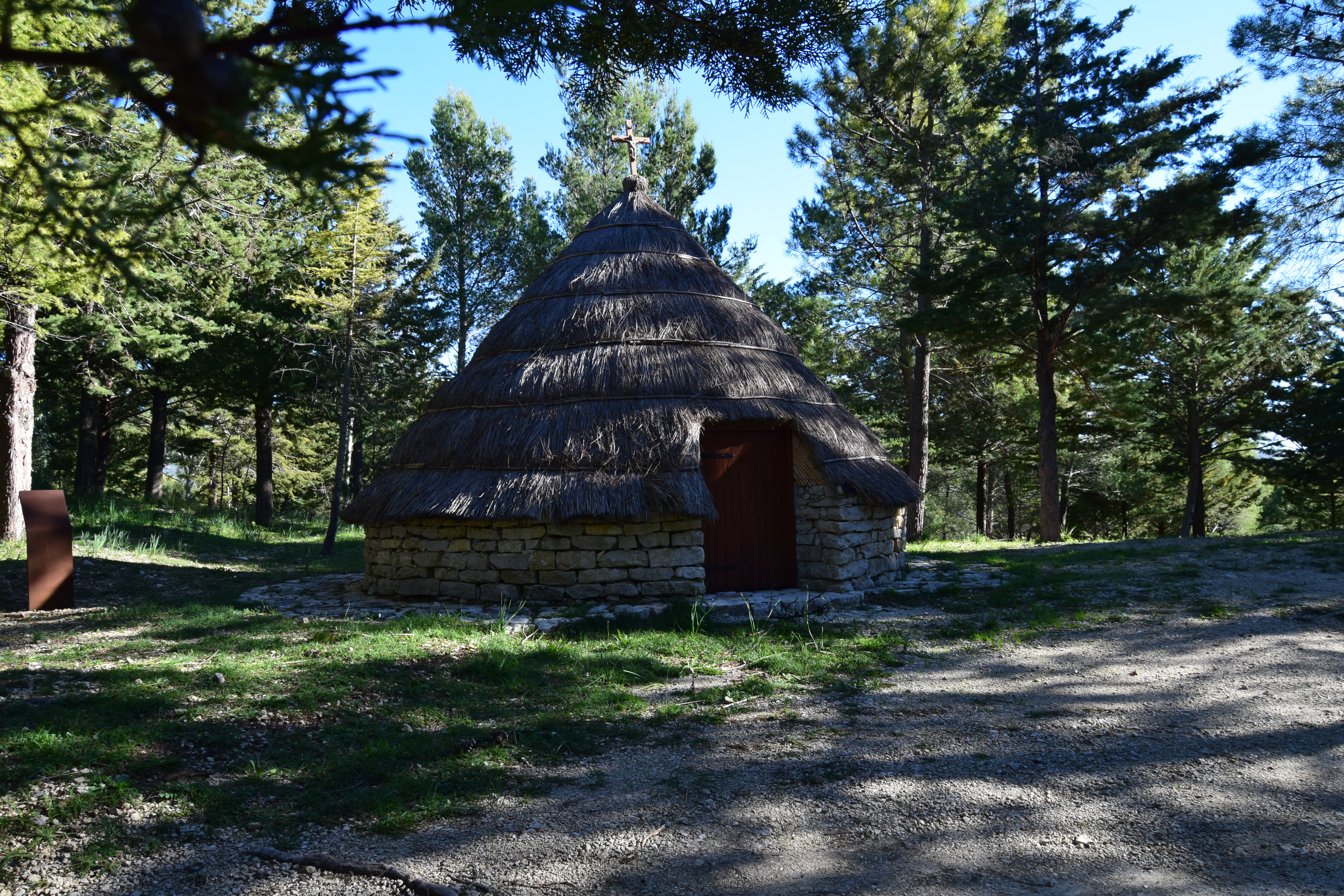
A pagghiaru, typical Sicanian rural architecture

Bivona lies in the inland region of the Province of Agrigento, bordering the Metropolitan City of Palermo.

The territory of Bivona spans approximately 89 km^{2} (34 sq mi) and is partially included in the "Oriented Nature Reserve of Palazzo Adriano Mountains and Sosio Valley" and the "Sicani Mountains Park".

Its elevation ranges from 64 m (210 ft) above sea level in the southern area, bordering Ribera and Cianciana, to 1,436 m (4,711 ft) at the summit of Monte delle Rose, north of the town, near Palazzo Adriano in the Metropolitan City of Palermo. The elevation of the inhabited area varies from 420 m (1,380 ft) in the southern districts to approximately 600 meters in the northern ones, typically cited as 503 m (1,650 ft), referencing the former town hall (now Piazza Giovanni Cinà).

- Seismic classification: Zone 2 (medium-high seismicity), PCM Ordinance No. 3274 of 20 March 2003.

==== Topography ====
The territory is situated at the foothills of the Monti Sicani, which encircle the town, forming a natural amphitheater. It encompasses the mid-valley section of the Magazzolo River basin. Approximately three-quarters of its area consists of foothill and hilly zones, with the remaining quarter being distinctly mountainous.

The mountainous landscape comprises limestone-dolomite formations from the Mesozoic era, primarily in the northern part of the territory.

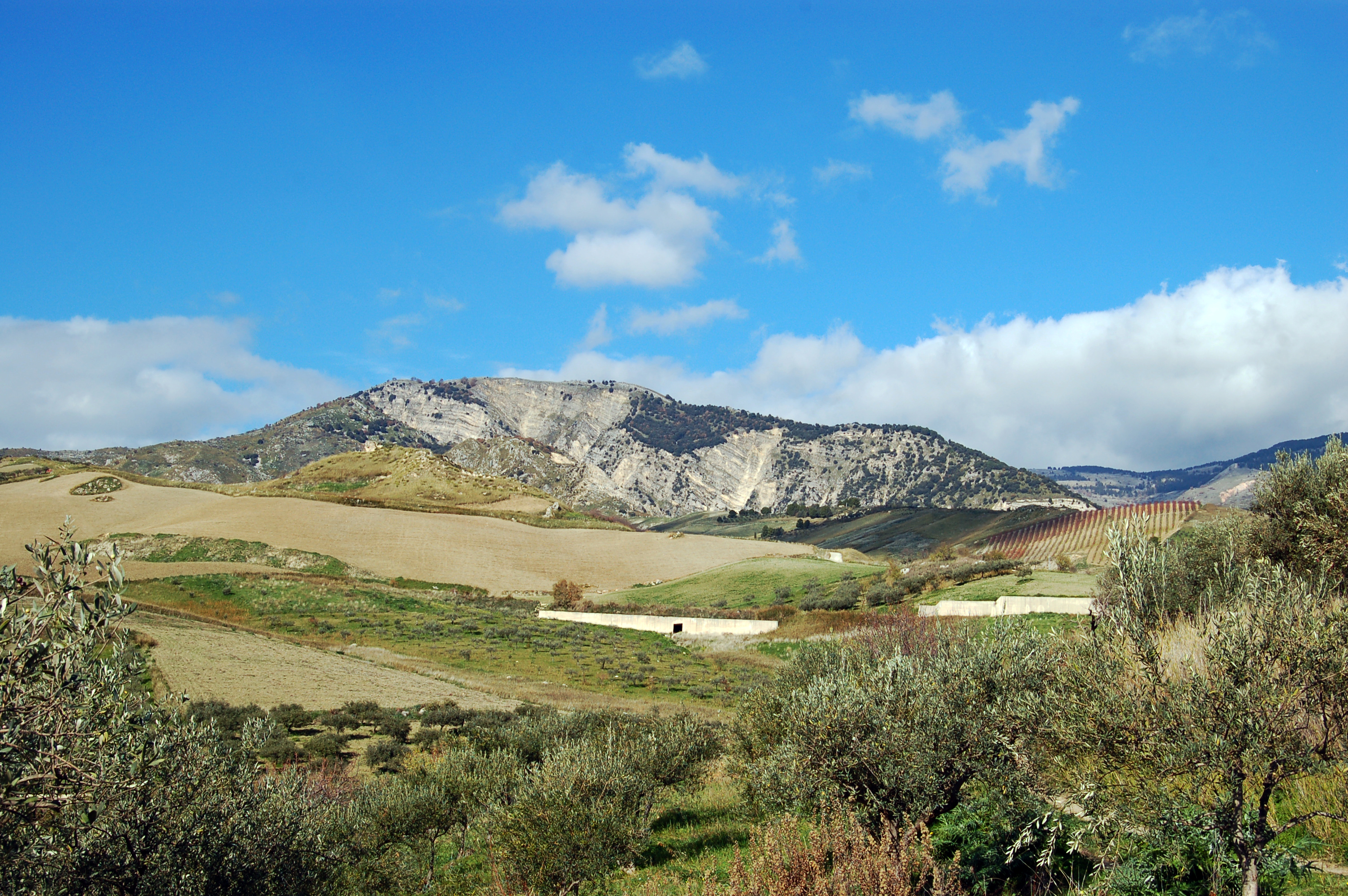
Panoramic view of Pizzo Mondello

The main peaks in Bivona's territory include:

- Monte delle Rose (1,436 m (4,711 ft));
- Monte Pernice (1,393 m (4,570 ft));
- Pizzo San Filippo (1,352 m (4,436 ft));
- Monte Scuro (1,310 m (4,300 ft));
- Pizzo Mondello (1,245 m (4,085 ft));
- Pizzo Catera (1,192 m (3,911 ft));
- Pizzo Scavarrante (1,072 m (3,517 ft));
- Pizzo di Naso (965 m (3,166 ft)).

The rocky outcrops of Pizzo Mondello, composed of layered limestone and flint with fossil shell traces (Halobia), are steeply inclined, reflecting the tectonic deformations experienced by the Sicani Mountains.

==== Hydrography ====
Bivona's territory forms part of the drainage basin of the Magazzolo River, bordered by Pizzo Mondello, Pizzo Scavarrante, Serra Mezzo Canale, and Cozzo Timpe Rosse. In addition to the main river, it includes tributaries such as Lordo, Calabrò, Acque Bianche, Salito, and Gebbia. The right-bank tributaries of the Magazzolo follow a tortuous course, exhibiting significant regressive erosion, providing substantial water flow during the rainy season but drying up in summer. Numerous springs feed three main natural channels, tributaries of the Magazzolo: the first, collecting water from the Santa Rosalia and Capo d’Acqua springs, is the Alba River, whose urban section has been underground since the mid-19th century; the second channels water from the Santissimo and Acque Bianche springs; and the third gathers water from the Grotticelle, Canfuto, and San Filippo springs.

A few kilometers from the town center lies the Castello Dam, creating an artificial lake with a capacity of approximately 21,000,000 m^{3} (740,000,000 cu ft). Its waters irrigate Bivona's peach orchards and the orange groves of Ribera.

==== Flora and fauna ====
The flora and fauna of Bivona's territory are characteristic of the mountainous and foothill zones of the Mediterranean region. In less anthropized areas, forests consist of holly oak, downy oak, and strawberry trees, with reforestation primarily involving Aleppo pine, cypress, black pine, and Cephalonian fir. A rich understory has been observed to include species such as spurge, hawthorn, and osyris.

In the 1930s, during a visit by Benito Mussolini, plane trees were planted along Via Lorenzo Panepinto, black locust trees in Piazza XXVIII Ottobre, and the municipal park was landscaped.

The fauna primarily includes small insectivorous birds such as blue tits, great tits, chaffinches, blackcaps, robins, and wrens, alongside blackbirds, wood pigeons, and jays.

=== Climate ===
As with the rest of the Sicani mountain range, the climate is classified as temperate and of the Mediterranean xerothermic type, with long summers and mild winters. Morphology and differences in altitude determine relative variability between different locations within the municipal area.

== Climate ==
Climate data for Bivona
Month	Jan	Feb	Mar	Apr	May	Jun	Jul	Aug	Sep	Oct	Nov	Dec	Year
Mean daily maximum °C (°F)	11.6 (52.9)	13.1 (55.6)	15.3 (59.5)	18.7 (65.7)	24.6 (76.3)	30.0 (86.0)	33.0 (91.4)	32.8 (91.0)	28.3 (82.9)	22.0 (71.6)	16.7 (62.1)	13.1 (55.6)	21.6 (70.9)
Mean daily minimum °C (°F)	4.8 (40.6)	5.1 (41.2)	6.4 (43.5)	8.5 (47.3)	12.3 (54.1)	17.2 (63.0)	20.0 (68.0)	20.4 (68.7)	17.0 (62.6)	12.8 (55.0)	9.4 (48.9)	6.5 (43.7)	11.7 (53.1)

- Climatic classification: Zone C, 1268 DD.

== Etymology ==
The origin of the name Bivona/Vivona is uncertain. It first appears in Latinized form as Bibona in 1160, but its modern form Bivona is found shortly after in a document from 1171. Due to medieval use of Latin as a lingua franca, the Latin form of the name remained more common in official documents until the early 16th century.

The variant Bisbona is recorded in 1363 and was considered a scholarly form in the 16th century, explicitly derived from (pseudo-)Latin bis bona ('twice good', feminine singular), although such a phrase would be grammatically strange, and this is almost certainly a folk etymology. A 1557 text states (translated from Italian): “This town is called Bivona, almost Bibona, that is, bis bona, for the purity of its air, being situated on high cliffs, and for the abundance of healthful waters and fruitful trees, of which it is exceedingly rich, a truly more than good and most pleasant place.” This etymology was supported by Trovato. A similar explanation has been invoked for the Tuscan town Bibbona, the relationship of which, if any, to Bivona is unknown and disputed.

Much more likely, it is related to the Calabrian Bivona or Vivona (near Vibo Valentia), from Latin Vībō, Vībōna, stemming from a pre-Greek substrate word which was later Hellenized as Ἱππώνιον (Hippṓnion), then re-Latinized as Hipponium following the end of Greek control. Contrary to popular interpretation, the Latin names beginning with V are not derived from Hipponium, but are in fact older and share a local origin. It is generally assumed that the Calabrian toponyms, tracing to Latin Vibo(n), are older than the Sicilian one; however, the historical connection between the two places which would explain their identical names is not known. Sicilian historian and classicist Marco Trizzino theorizes the Sicilian town may have been named by Byzantine-era monks traveling to the Agrigento area from Calabria. Furthermore, with the assistance of Johannes Bergemann, he rules out the possibility of an Arabic origin, as well as a derivation from Hippana, and instead believes that Bivona and various similar toponyms have a shared substrate origin in pre-Indo-European languages. (See §Ancient era below.)

== History ==
=== Ancient era ===
Archaeological finds suggest human presence in Bivona's territory as early as the Copper Age. Hilltop sites in the area show continuous habitation from the Iron Age to the Middle Ages (Monte Castelluccio and Bonifacio), with near-total abandonment during the Roman period, when large rural settlements formed in river valleys.

Due to misinterpretations of ancient sources, Bivona was once thought to have Greek origins, identified with Hipponium, founded by Gelon. Another unverified hypothesis linked it to the indigenous (later Hellenized) center of Hippana, later identified at Monte dei Cavalli (Prizzi), though both names may share a common Mediterranean substrate root (*vīp-/vīb-).

=== Medieval era ===
Bivona is first documented in 1160, during the reigns of Roger II and his successors William I and William II. Initially a Muslim-inhabited hamlet, it quickly grew into a significant center in the Vallo di Mazara.

By the late 13th century, it became a lordship but was sacked in 1359 by royal troops under Francesco Ventimiglia. The Bivona Castle was then entrusted to Corrado Doria.

Bivona flourished under the Chiaramonte lordship (1363–1392) and especially under the De Luna, key figures in the Cases of Sciacca.

=== Early modern era ===
In 1554, Charles V elevated the barony of Bivona to a duchy, both due to its status as one of the most populous feudal centers in Sicily and the most populous under the de Luna family, and because of the favorable relations between the emperor and the Viceroy of Sicily Juan de Vega, father-in-law of Pietro de Luna, the first duke of Bivona and the first Sicilian noble to receive the highest feudal title of the time.

Over the next two centuries, the duchy passed to the Montcada family (the princes of Paternò), then to Spanish noble families who remained uninvolved in local affairs, leading to the town's decline.

=== Contemporary era ===
In 1812, the new Constitution abolished feudalism in the Kingdom of Sicily, fostering Bivona's economic revival. The town was designated the capital of the eponymous district (later the administrative district in the Kingdom of Italy), one of twenty-three divisions of the island, encompassing thirteen municipalities.

In the 20th century, Bivona developed as an administrative and cultural hub of inland Agrigento, hosting various health and administrative offices, as well as secondary schools.

=== Symbols ===
Coat of arms of the Municipality

Gonfalon of the Municipality

The current coat of arms of the City of Bivona was granted by a decree of the President of the Republic on 8 July 2021.

Azure, a golden pine cone in bend, with three green leaves, one facing the chief, two facing the base, surmounted by a silver crescent. External ornaments of a City.

— D.P.R. 8 July 2021

The gonfalon is a white cloth bordered in azure; the flag is a white cloth bordered in azure.

Previous version of the coat of arms

The coat of arms used until 2021 was described in the municipal statute as:

A shield bearing two intertwined branches of oak and olive, surmounted by a crown, depicting a waning crescent moon in the upper part and a crab in the lower part.

The crescent moon represents the noble family of the first dukes, the De Luna d'Aragona, while the crab may recall the ancient symbol of Akragas. The gonfalon of the municipality of Bivona reproduces the coat of arms on an azure background, enriched with floral decorations.

According to the Statute of the Municipality of Bivona, the municipality has its own anthem.

=== Honors ===
Title of City - ribbon for ordinary uniform

Title of City

When Charles V elevated the barony to a duchy in 1554 during the Kingdom of Sicily, Bivona earned the right to assume the title of city.

== Monuments and places of interest ==
Bivona boasts numerous religious buildings (approximately forty throughout its history). Many 17th century noble palaces have been destroyed or incorporated into more modern structures.

=== Religious architecture ===
[...] pays ancore très abondant en Eglises, et sur-tout en Convents
[Bivona is] a feudal center still very rich in churches, and especially in convents

— Jean-Pierre Houël, Voyage pittoresque des isles de Sicile, de Malta et de Lipari, 1785

==== Churches ====
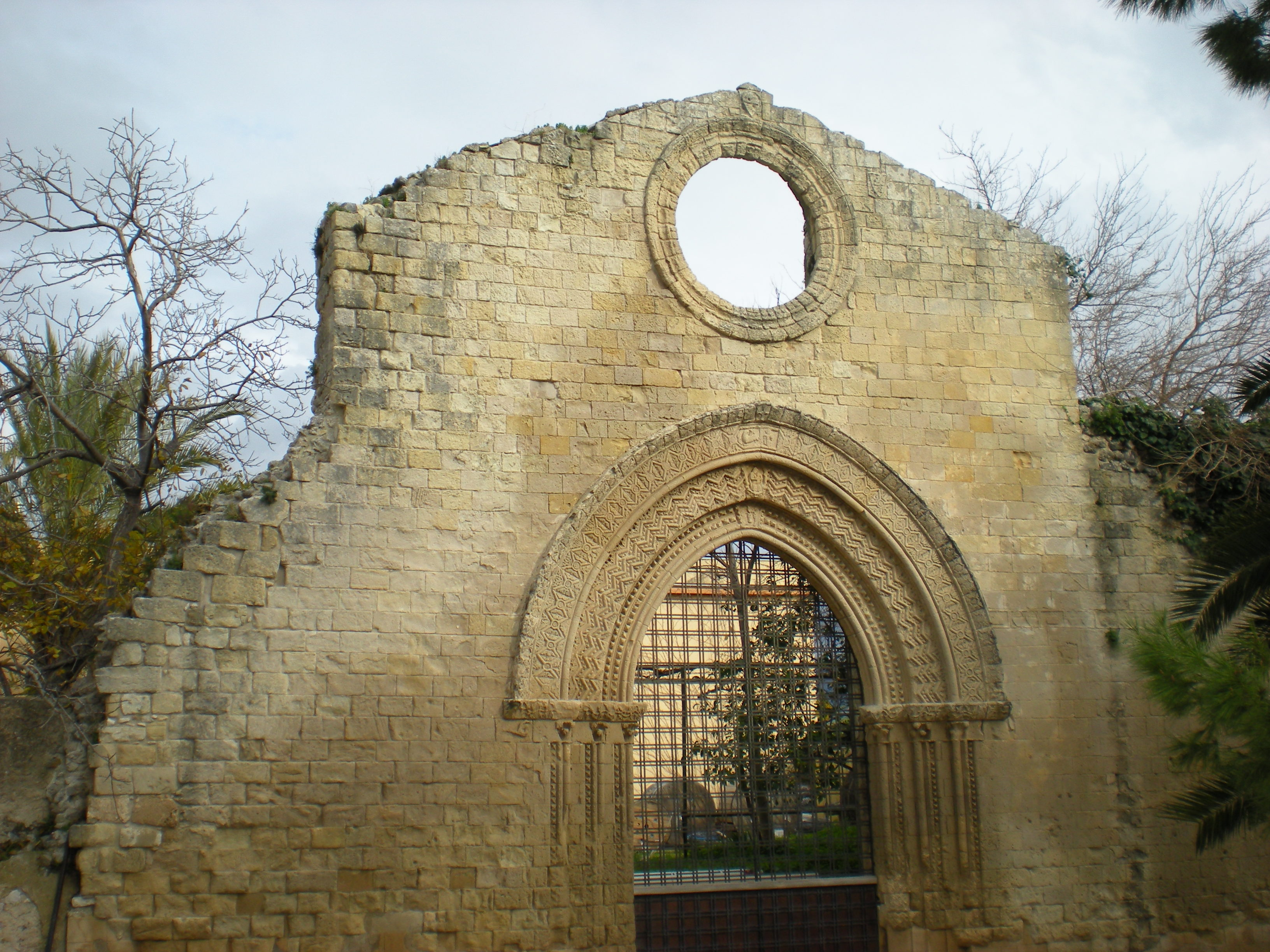
Portal of the Chiaramontana Mother Church

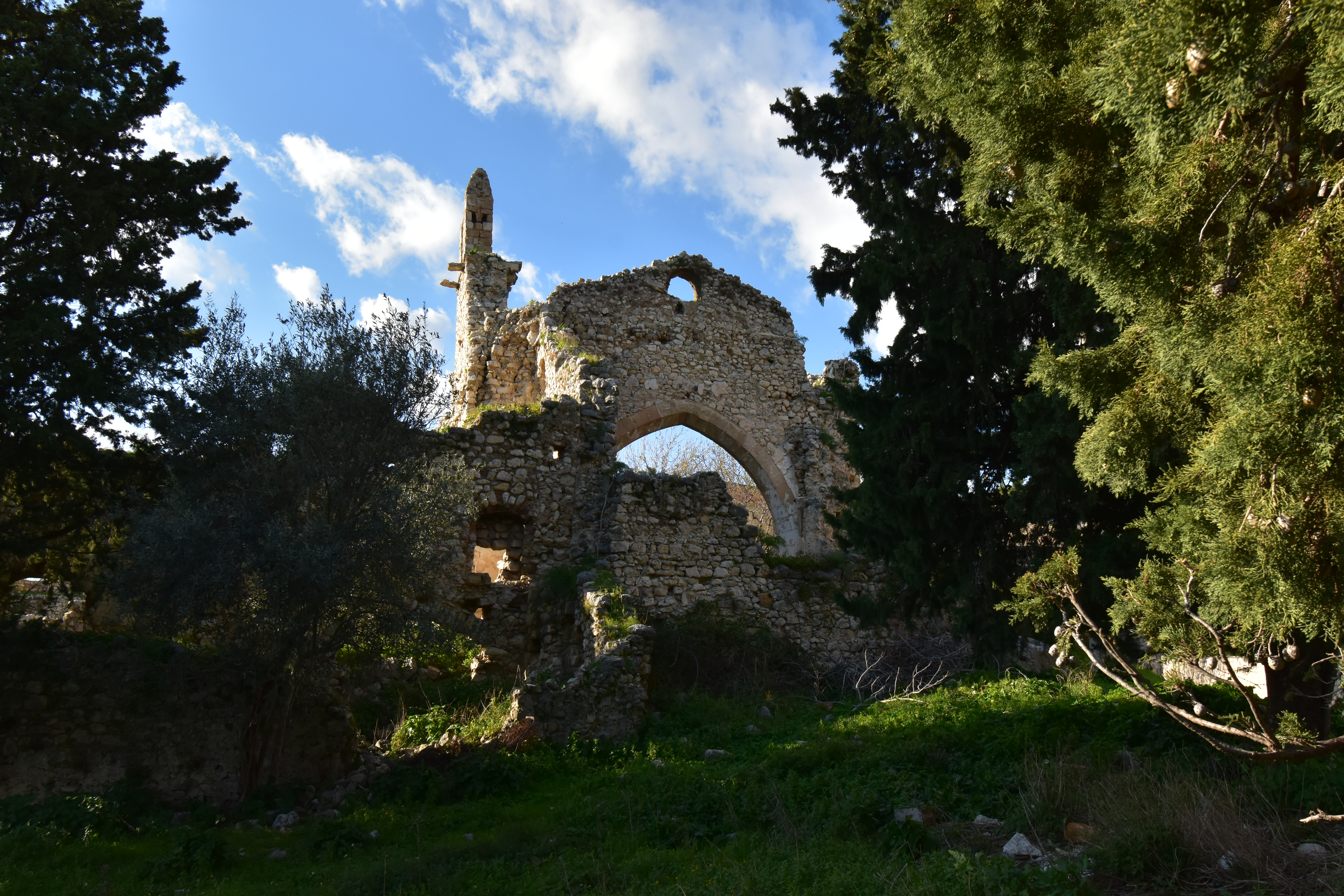
Ruins of Santa Maria di Gesù

- Chiaramontana Mother Church (13th century), in Gothic style, with only the portal of the main façade remaining, an example of Chiaramonte Gothic art in Sicily.
- Church of San Bartolomeo (13th–14th century), with only the Baroque-style portal of the main façade surviving.
- Church of Santa Rosalia (13th–14th century), featuring a Baroque portal, housing the frame of the saint's statue (1601), a wooden crucifix, and several 17th–18th-century paintings; a small trapdoor provides access to the trunk of the oak tree under which the saint is believed to have prayed during her time in Bivona's woods.
- Church of the Annunciation (14th century), also known as the Church of the Carmine, containing paintings by Giuseppe Salerno, known as the "Zoppo di Ganci".
- Church of San Sebastiano (14th–15th century), also called Santa Chiara, with a late Renaissance-Mannerist portal.
- Church of San Paolo (15th century), with a 17th-century Baroque portal, featuring Baroque decorations, 18th-century statues, and paintings.
- Church of Santa Maria di Loreto (15th century), also known as San Domenico, one of Bivona's largest churches, though degraded by the mid-20th century with furnishings lost or transferred to other Bivona churches.
- Church of Santa Maria di Gesù (16th century), now in ruins and privately owned; originally Gothic, renovated in the 18th century.
- Church of San Giacomo Maggiore, or Cappuccini (16th century), containing numerous funerary inscriptions and a large 16th-century painting of the Madonna degli Angeli on the main altar.
- Mother Church Mater Salvatoris (16th century), built by the Jesuits and expanded in the 17th century, becoming the new mother church in 1781.
- Church of Sant’Isidoro Agricola (17th century), erected by citizens after poor agricultural years in honor of Saint Isidore, protector of farmers, lacking decorative elements.
- Sanctuary of the Madonna dell’Olio, an ancient extra-urban worship site dedicated to the Madonna di l’Ogliu. In 2008, it was included in the Sicilian Region's Regional Map of Places of Identity and Memory.

Additionally, destroyed churches include: the Church of Sant’Andrea (late 12th century or early 13th century, likely Bivona's first church and mother church); the Church of Sant’Antonio Abate (first mentioned on 23 February 1419); the Church of Sant’Agata, built during the Chiaramonte lordship (1363–1392); the Church of San Giovanni Battista; the Church of Santa Maria Maddalena (ceded to the Jesuits in 1595, becoming the new mother church); and the Church of San Pietro, later Santa Maria del Soccorso (single-nave with one chapel per side and a small bell tower).

Finally, among destroyed religious buildings is the Church of the Immaculate Conception (1648), built at the expense of Bivona's poet and physician Giuseppe Romano (1613–1681). It collapsed in the 20th century and was rebuilt as a meeting and conference venue. The original Baroque portal with twisted columns, relocated to the nearby Church of Santa Maria di Loreto, was buried under rubble after that church's roof collapsed. The main altar once housed a statue of the Immaculate Conception, now preserved in the Mother Church.

==== Chapels ====
- Chapel of the Madonna della Sprescia, located in Contrada San Leonardo in the southern part of the town, existing in 1834.
- Chapel of the Camposanto, located within the cemetery, operational since 1882.

==== Other sacred buildings ====
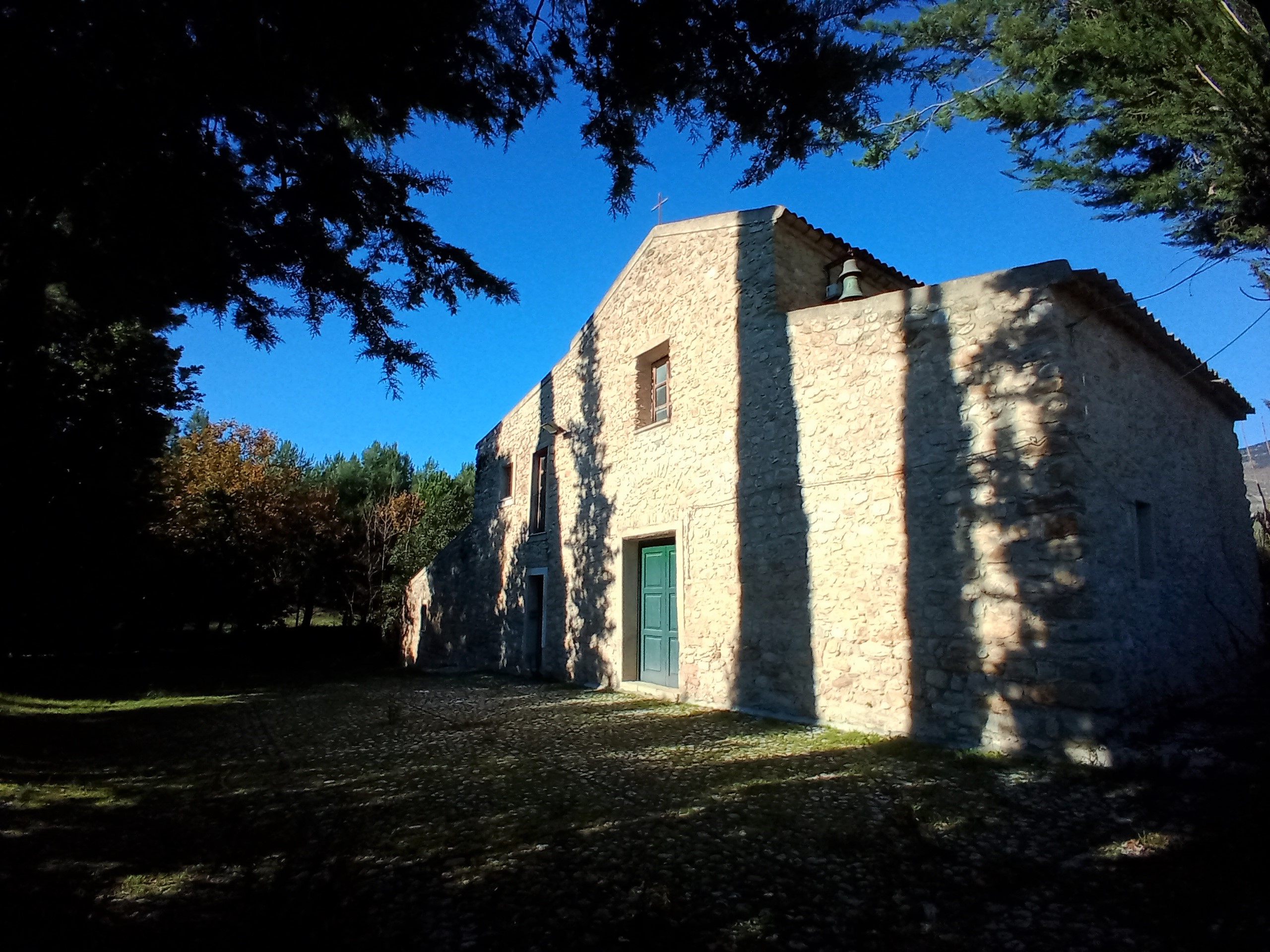
The extra-urban Sanctuary of the Madonna dell’Olio

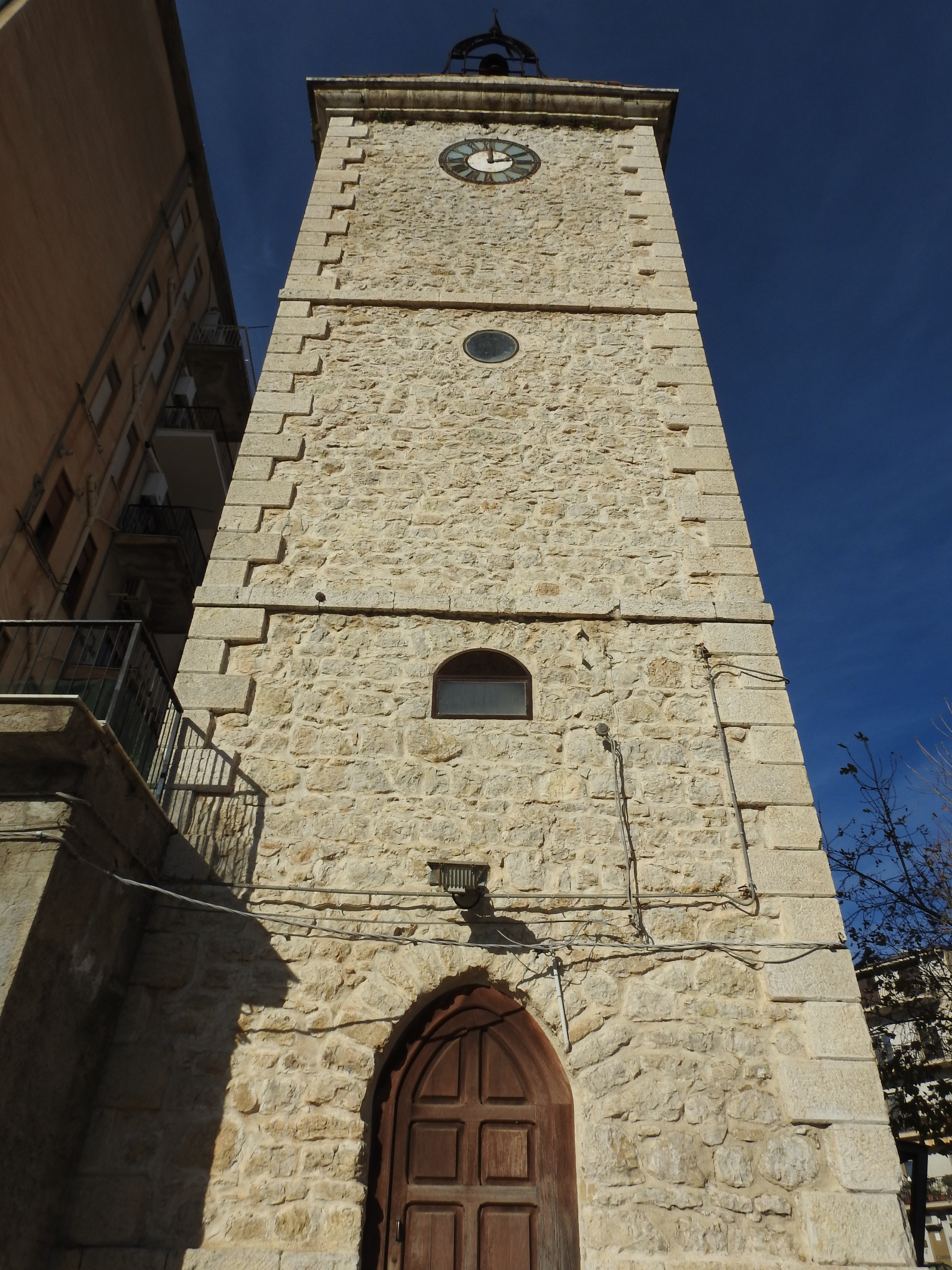
The Clock Tower

- Carmelite Convent, likely established in the 14th century as the seat of the Carmelites, later housing the Congregation of Augustinian nuns, and now serving as the municipal library.
- Dominican Convent, founded in the 15th century as the Dominican seat, later a carabinieri barracks, then a university and school site.
- Capuchin Convent, established around the mid-16th century for the Capuchins, still under their ownership.
- Monastery of the Clares, founded in 1585 as a Jesuit college, later housing the Congregation of Clares, now a retirement home.
- Jesuit College, established between the late 16th century and early 17th century, after the original site was ceded to the Clares; later a school and then the municipal seat.

Other convents included the Convent of the Minor Conventuals, established in 1394, and the Benedictine Monastery, founded in the early 15th century for the Congregation of Cassinese Benedictine Nuns, now an educational institute and the Bivona ASL headquarters, and the Convent of Santa Maria di Gesù, once home to the Observant Friars Minor and later the Reformed Friars Minor.

==== Sacred shrines ====
Bivona's sacred shrines reflect a deep-rooted religious tradition, once serving as true places of worship. While some no longer exist, many remain, particularly those within xanée. Their significance also stemmed from their use as reference points for streets and areas before formal urban toponymy was established.

=== Civil architecture ===
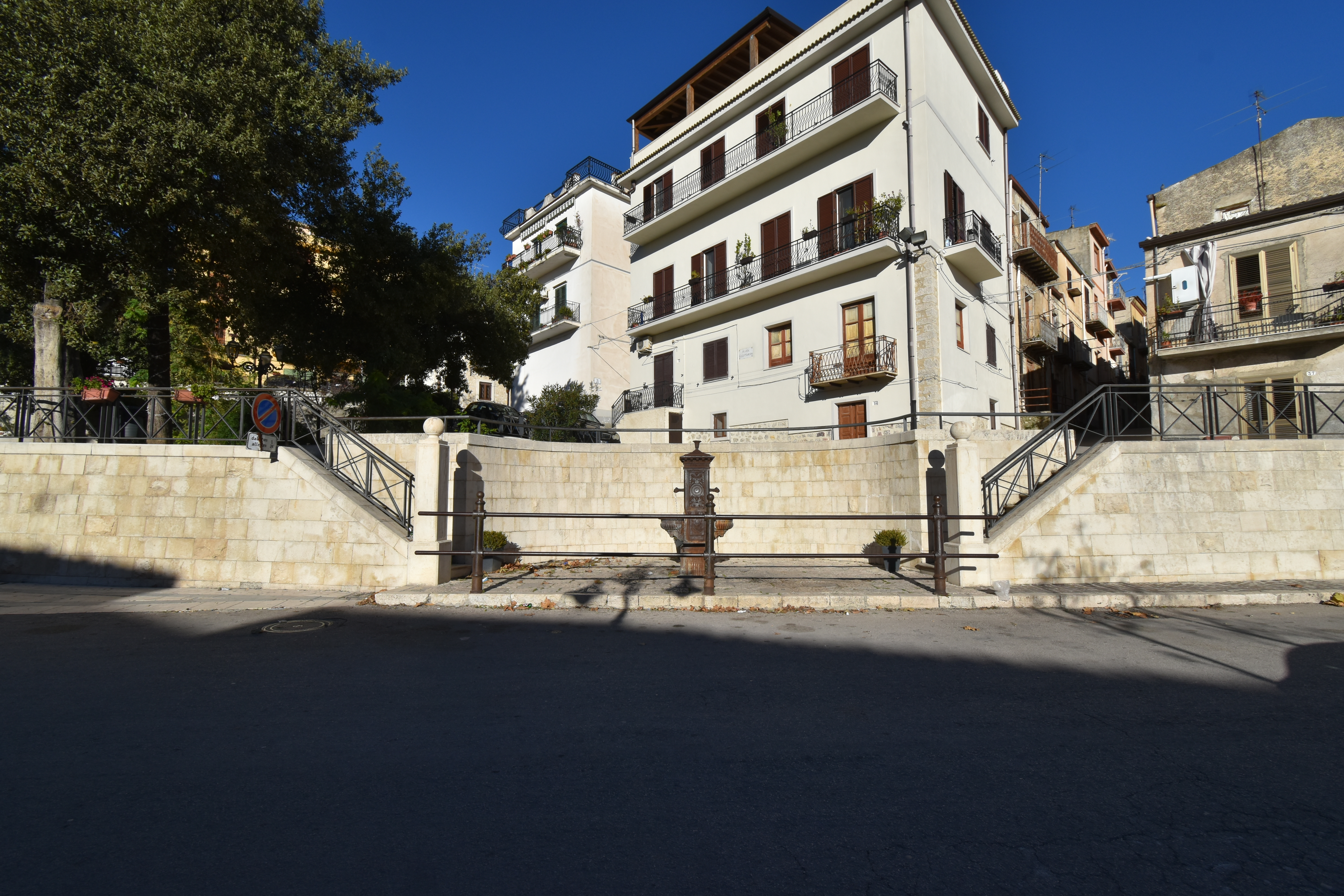
Mezzaranciu Fountain

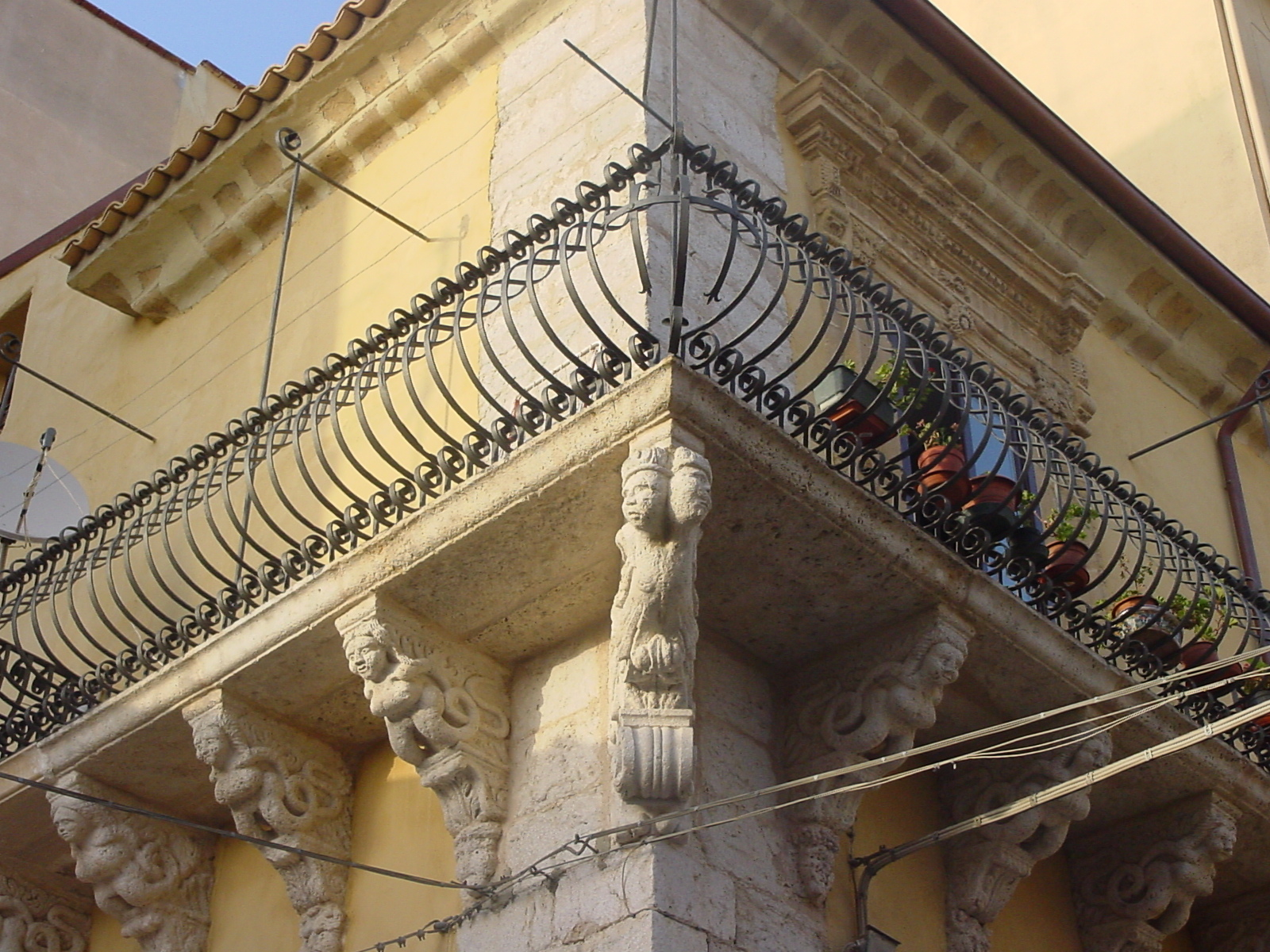
Marchese Greco Palace

==== Palaces ====
- Ducal Palace (16th century), residence of the first ducal family, the De Luna d'Aragona.
- Municipal Palace, originally a Jesuit college.
- Marchese Greco Palace (18th century), built in Baroque style and the only noble palace in Bivona retaining its original architectural features.
- De Michele Palace, home of the De Michele barons and residence of sub-prefects.
- Guggino Barons’ Palace, formerly of the Greco marquises, centered around a xanèa with a sacred niche inside.
- Municipal House, later the seat of the magistrate's court and subsequently the justice of the peace office.

==== Fountains ====
Bivona has about twenty public fountains. Though some were mentioned in 18th-century documents, most were built from 1887, when the first public water system was established. Some are simple iron or cast-iron fountains, such as the "Mezzaranciu" fountain (half-orange, due to its basin shape) or the "lu Roggiu" fountain (of the clock). Others include washbasins, such as the "Fontana di li ferri" in the southern part of town, while some were former livestock troughs, such as the "Fontana pazza" (so named because its water level indicated drought years) and the trough in Piazza Marconi, in the town center.

==== Other civil architecture ====
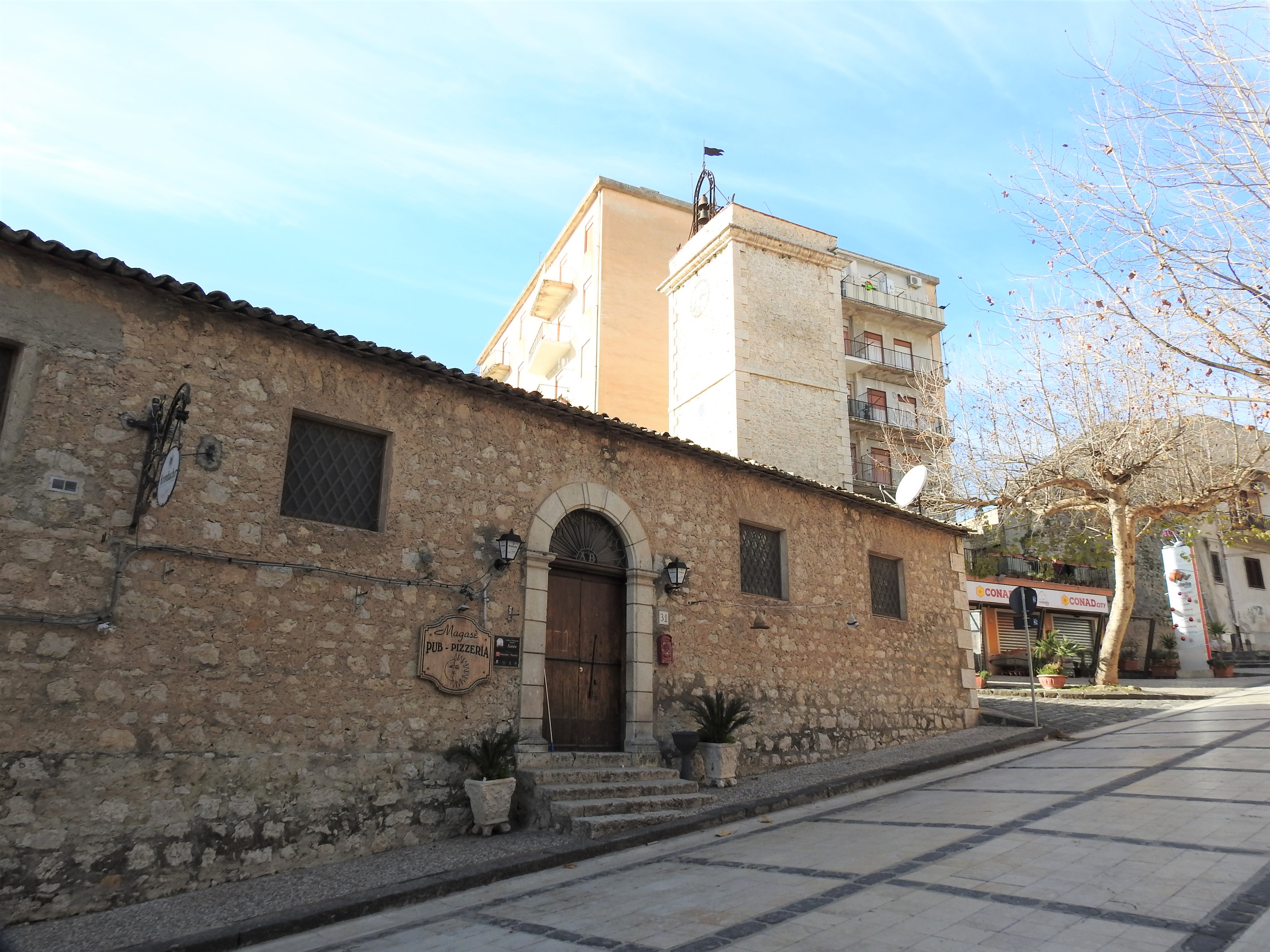
Ancient ducal warehouse

- Clock Tower (19th century), built after the 1775 collapse of the bell tower of the Church of San Giovanni, which had housed the civic clock since at least 1588. The square-based tower features stone façades divided by string courses.
- Ducal Warehouse (16th century), used as a ducal storehouse near the Clock Tower and a few dozen meters north of the Ducal Palace. Before 1847, the Alba River flowed in front, crossed by a bridge.
- Municipal Park, landscaped in the 1930s in Piazza Guglielmo Marconi, replacing the former Piazza Fiera, the town's main square. Once enclosed by railings, it features a circular fountain (formerly a trough), a war memorial, and a monument to Cesare Sermenghi, with bead trees, black locusts, and some exotic plants.
- Irrigation Conduit (19th century), built with the opening of Bivona's aqueduct in 1889, restored in 1894 by engineers Compagno and Messina of Palermo, and further renovated between October 1928 and September 1932.
- The Casino (17th century), likely a hunting lodge near Monte Il Casino, preserving ruins of a chapel and other arched rooms.
- Ruins of the "Cirriè Houses," a large farmhouse with a central courtyard.
- Remains of the Municipal Theater, located on the street of the same name, built in 1834 and completed after 1847. It became municipal property in 1864. Despite having two floors and loggias with good lighting, its small size and distance from major cultural centers limited its prominence, leaving only the street name (Via Teatro) and some ruins.
- Prisons, once located in the San Domenico district, moved to the Santa Rosalia district in 1714, and later, with the establishment of the district prison, housed on the ground floor of the Ducal Palace.

=== Military architecture ===
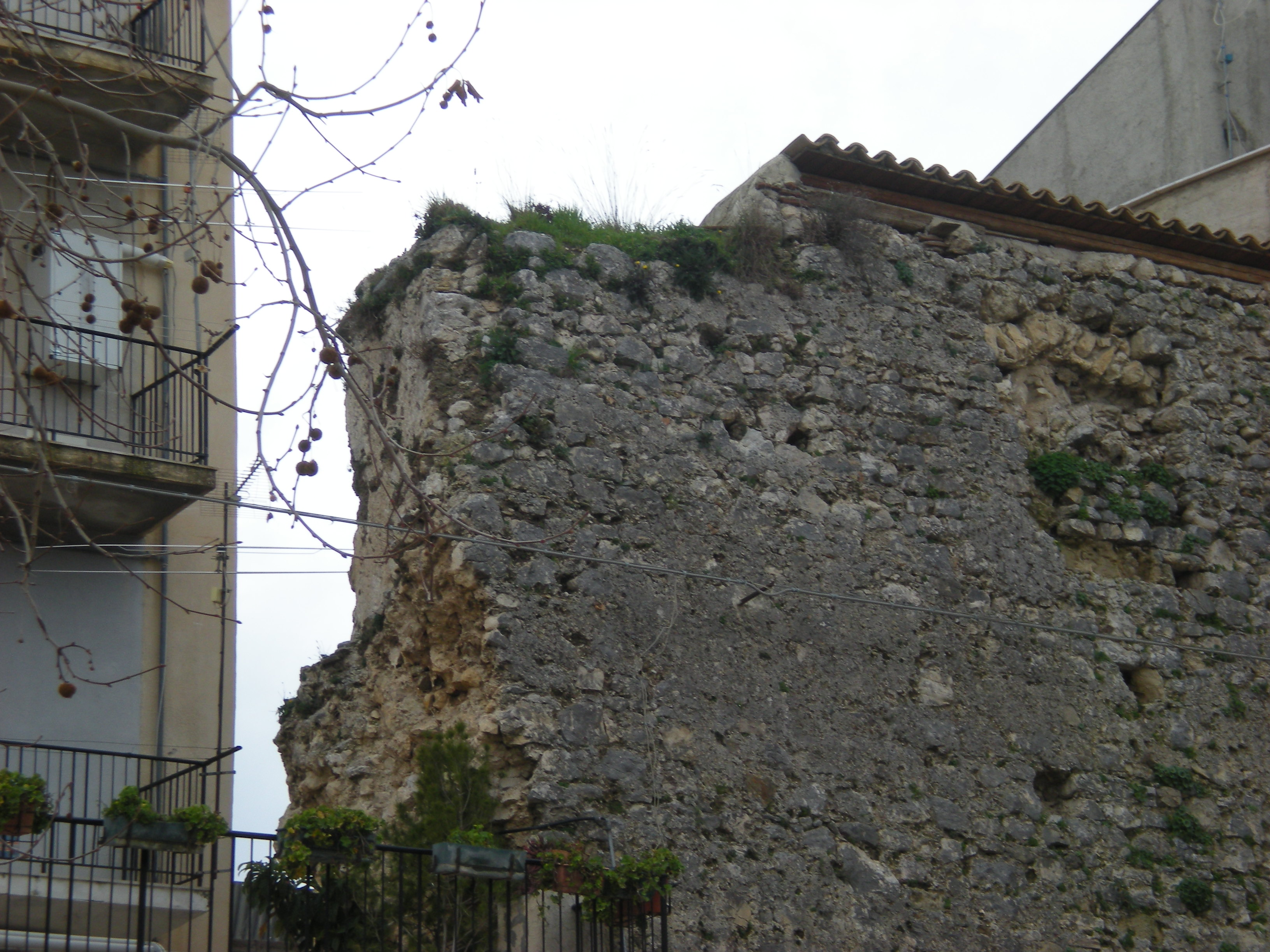
Ruins of Bivona Castle

- Remains of the bastion and ruins of the Castle (14th century).
- Watchtower, or Turris Bibonae, mentioned in a 1299 document transferring ownership of Bivona Castle, into which it was incorporated.
- Defensive Tower, near the "Ponte Pisciato," part of the city's defensive walls, with ruins visible until the 1960s.
- City Walls, constructed in the 14th century, their circuit deducible from the positions of contemporary sacred buildings, documents, and toponyms. The western section featured the Porta dei Cavalieri; the southern section lay just below the Chiaramontana Mother Church; the eastern section followed the course of the Alba River through the town.

=== Other ===
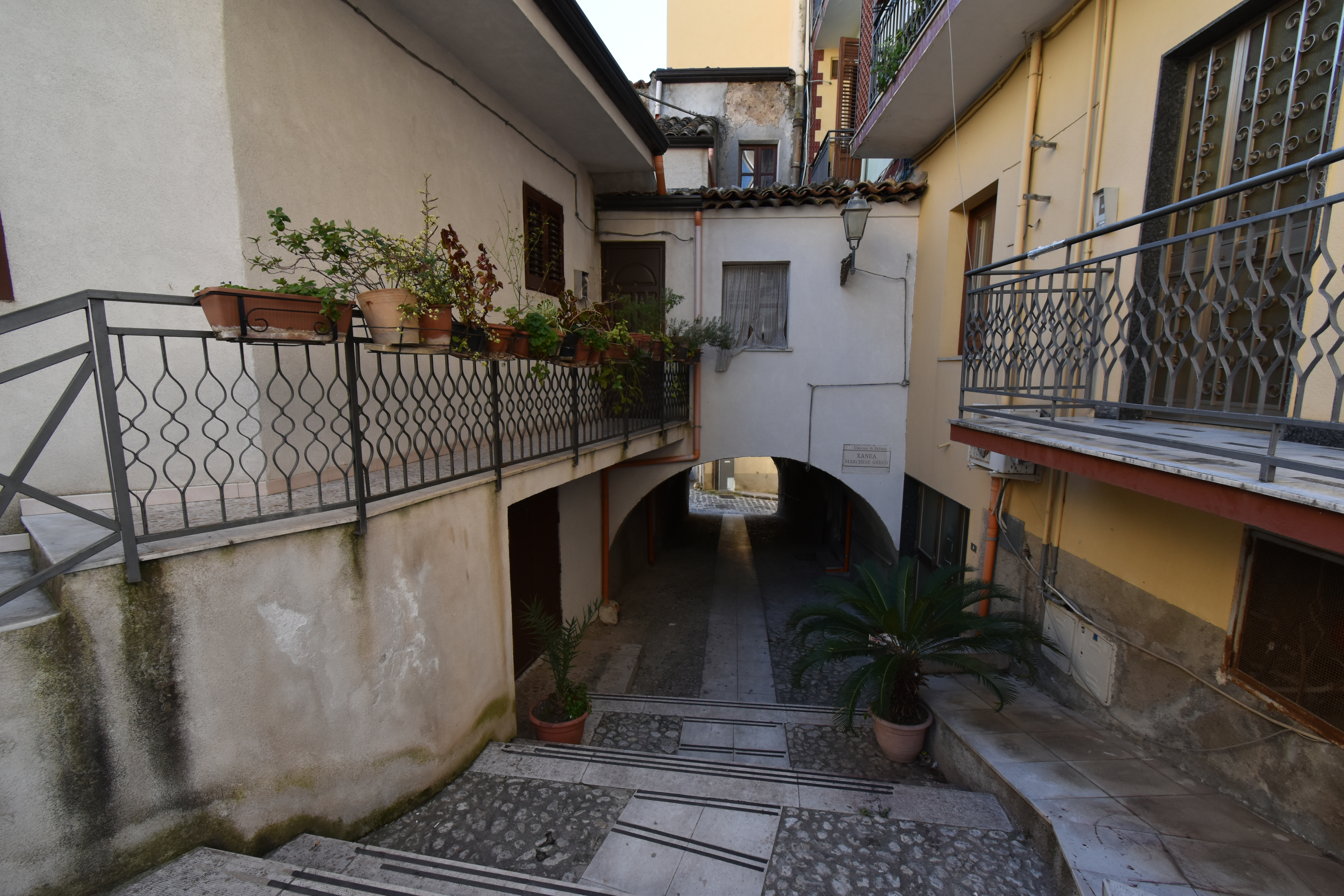
Xanèa of Via Arco Marchese Greco

Four monuments adorn Bivona's squares and streets: the Monument to the Fallen of All Wars, inaugurated in 2009, located in Piazza San Giovanni; the Monument to Cesare Sermenghi, in the municipal park; the Monument to the Workers’ and Peasants’ Movement, in Piazza San Paolo near the former Benedictine monastery; and the Monument to Blood Donors, unveiled in the 1990s, near the Ducal Palace.

In 2011, a bas-relief honoring Falcone and Borsellino was inaugurated in the street named after them, created by artist Lorenzo Reina from Santo Stefano Quisquina.

=== Archaeological sites ===
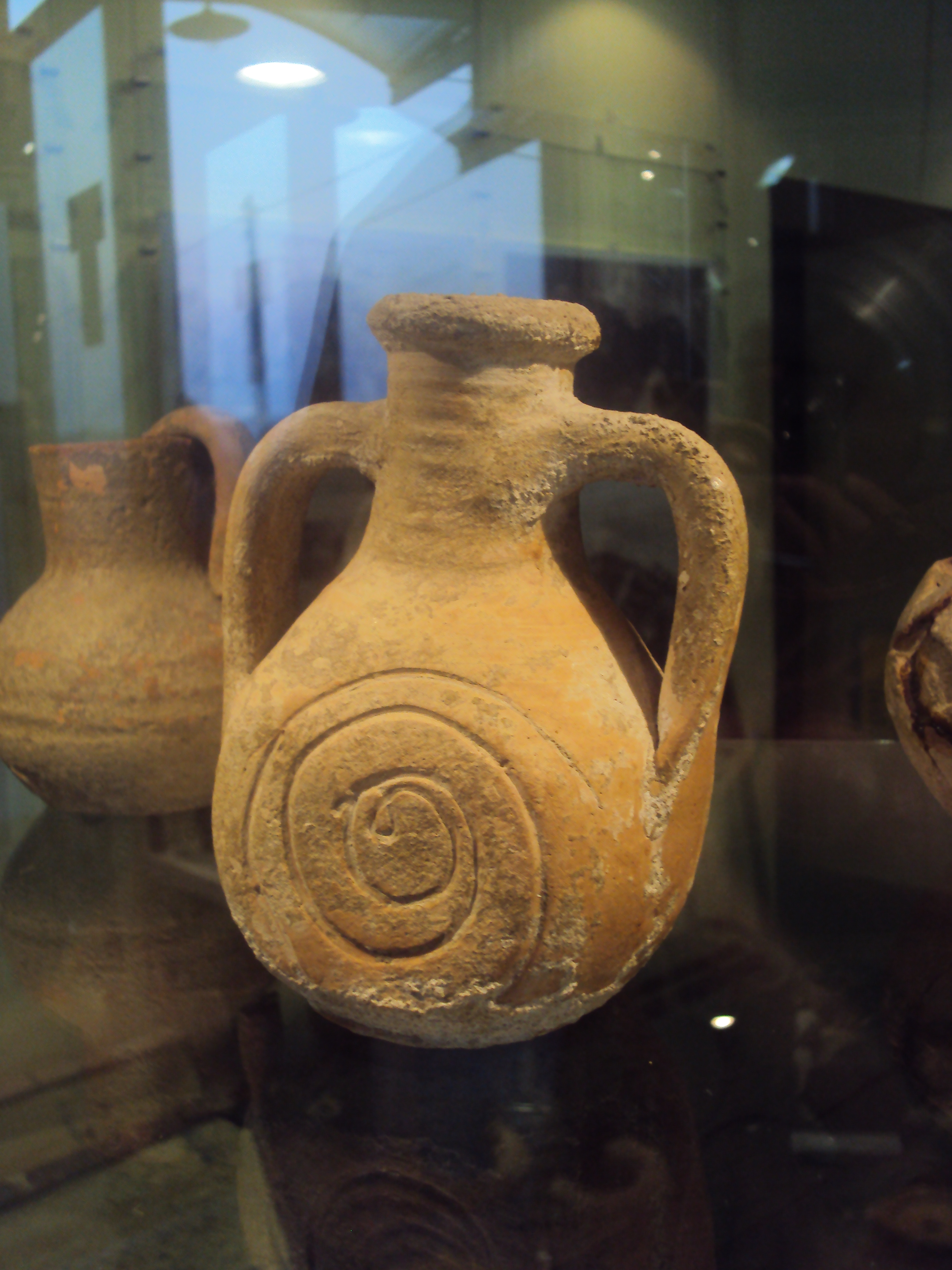
Amphora with spiral decoration found in Contrada Millaga (Cianciana Civic Museum)

Part of Bivona's territory lies within the Oriented Nature Reserve of Palazzo Adriano Mountains and Sosio Valley, home to Sicily's oldest fossil finds.

Numerous archaeological discoveries confirm human presence since the Copper Age: Serraferlicchio pottery shards, black mother-of-pearl pottery, Punic coins, a Roman wine amphora, an Arezzo jug base, a coin of Marcus Vipsanius Agrippa, and Muslim necropolises. These are joined by a prehistoric rock necropolis, the necropolis in Contrada Millaga near Cianciana’s town center, and remains of walls tentatively identified as a Sicanian necropolis, along with sparse surface finds.

A survey conducted from 2009 by a team from the Georg-August University of Göttingen identified approximately 200 archaeological sites in Bivona and neighboring municipalities.

=== Natural areas ===
Bivona is one of the two main seats of the Sicani Mountains Park, Sicily's fifth regional park, definitively established in 2012.

Part of Bivona's territory was within the Oriented Nature Reserve of Palazzo Adriano Mountains and Sosio Valley, established in 1997 and later incorporated into the park.

In the eastern part of Bivona's territory, toward Santo Stefano Quisquina, the "Canfuto state-owned campground" extends over about three hectares, a wooded hill, mostly covered in conifers, that offers a view of the Magazzolo Valley.

== Society ==
=== Demographic evolution ===
Demographic evolution of Bivona
Year	Pop.	±%
1861	3,475	—
1871	4,030	+16.0%
1881	4,559	+13.1%
1901	4,850	+6.4%
1911	4,741	−2.2%
1921	5,134	+8.3%
1931	5,146	+0.2%
1936	5,324	+3.5%
1951	5,667	+6.4%
1961	5,287	−6.7%
1971	5,043	−4.6%
1981	5,030	−0.3%
1991	5,076	+0.9%
2001	4,225	−16.8%
2011	3,882	−8.1%
2021	3,257	−16.1%

From the second half of the 15th century, Bivona experienced demographic and economic growth, largely due to its Jewish community and numerous religious orders, especially after its elevation to a duchy in the 16th century.

The establishment of new feudal municipalities in the Bivona area led to a demographic decline in the 17th century, reaching a low of 2,000 inhabitants in 1806. A subsequent demographic recovery followed.

With Italy's unification, the hamlet of San Ferdinando, with about fifty inhabitants, was detached from Bivona (to which it belonged since 1814) and renamed Filaga, later becoming a frazione of Prizzi. In the second half of the 20th century, the population declined again due to emigration.

=== Ethnic groups and foreign minorities ===
The foreign population in Bivona is relatively small: as of 31 December 2024, there were 54 foreign residents, accounting for 1.90% of the population, a figure significantly lower than the national average.

Over the centuries, Bivona's population has been composed of various ethnic groups: it was a pagus Saracenorum (a village of Saracens, as described by the historian Tommaso Fazello), thus inhabited by Arab people, who left significant traces in both Bivona's toponymy and dialect. Subsequently, the town's population grew with the arrival of the Normans. The town was influenced by both the populations that dominated Sicily (Angevins, Aragonese) and, especially, by the lords (and later dukes) who held power in the town, almost all of whom were of Spanish origin.

At the end of the 14th century, a Jewish community settled in the town, giving rise to the Jewish ghetto of Bivona.

== Languages and dialects ==
The Bivona dialect, used alongside the Italian language, belongs to the group of western dialects of the Sicilian language; it was first studied by Paolo Trizzino in 1920 under the guidance of Giacomo De Gregorio.

The Bivona dialect has been influenced by the Arabic language, with its legacy evident in both phonetics and lexicon: in phonetics, as the voiceless velar fricative h has spread to many dialectal words of non-Arabic origin; in the lexicon, as most local toponyms derive from Arabic, for example, Magazzolo, which comes from magzil, meaning "turbulent waters," or xanèa (sometimes also written as hanèa, khanèa, hanìa, or hanèia), a term attested only in Bivona.

== Religion ==
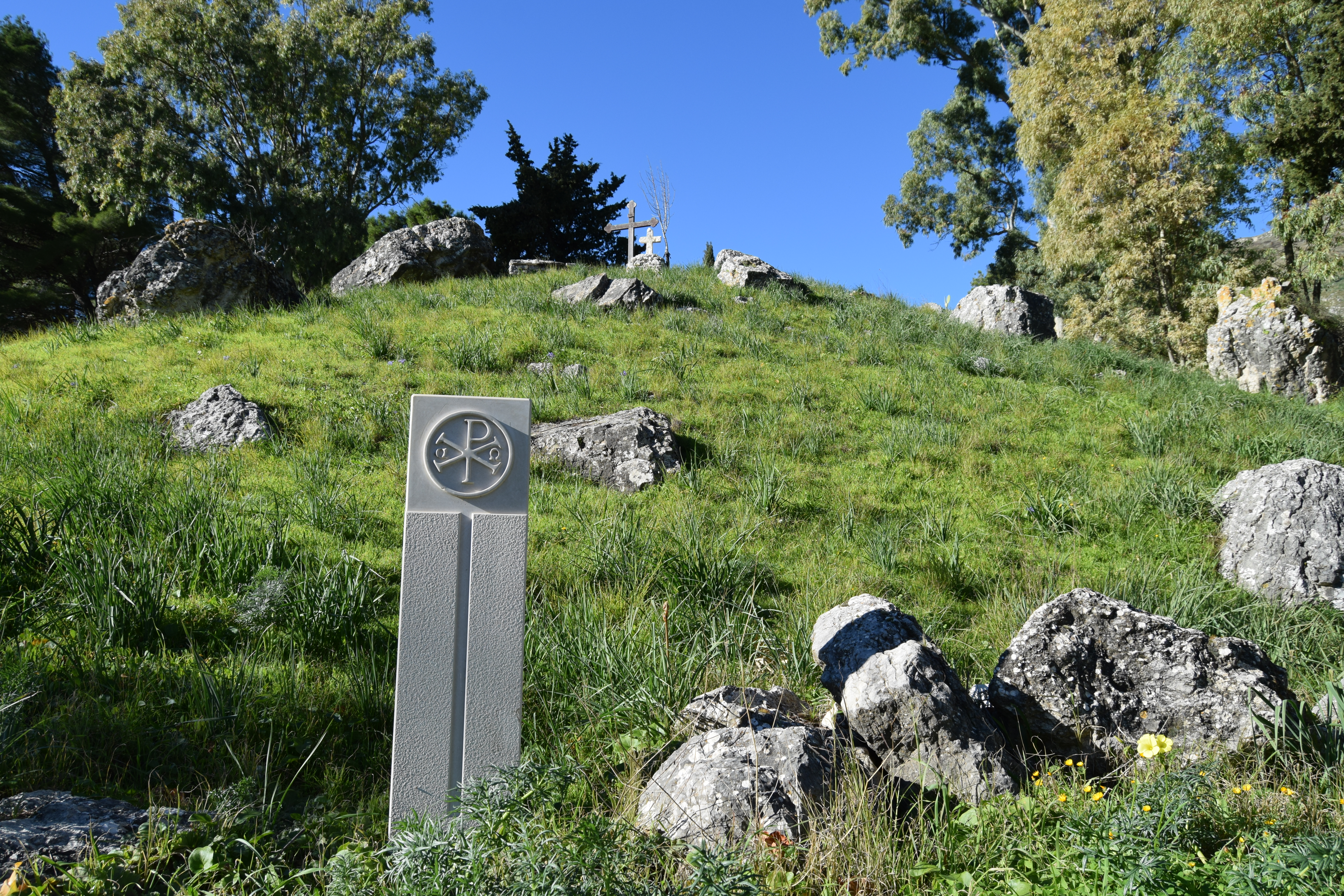
Mount Calvary

The predominant religion practiced in Bivona is Catholicism: Bivona, part of the Archdiocese of Agrigento, has preserved its religious traditions, particularly the ancient devotion to Saint Rosalia, the Palermo-born virgin who lived much of her life in the mountains of Bivona. The co-patrons of the town are Saint Francis of Assisi and the Madonna dell'Olio.

The first religion practiced in Bivona was likely Islam. With the expulsion of Muslims from Sicily, Christianity spread in Bivona, although the presence of the Jewish quarter is also documented in the 15th century, housing a small Jewish community, which was expelled in 1492; by 1454, the community must have exceeded forty families, the number required to establish a local synagogue. In subsequent centuries, numerous religious orders settled in the town, numbering more than thirty, and over forty sacred buildings were constructed, an unusual occurrence for a community that never exceeded 8,000 inhabitants.

In addition to the Catholic Church, which has two local parishes, there is a Pentecostal community, founded in 1925 and re-established in 1981 as a local expression of the Assemblies of God in Italy.

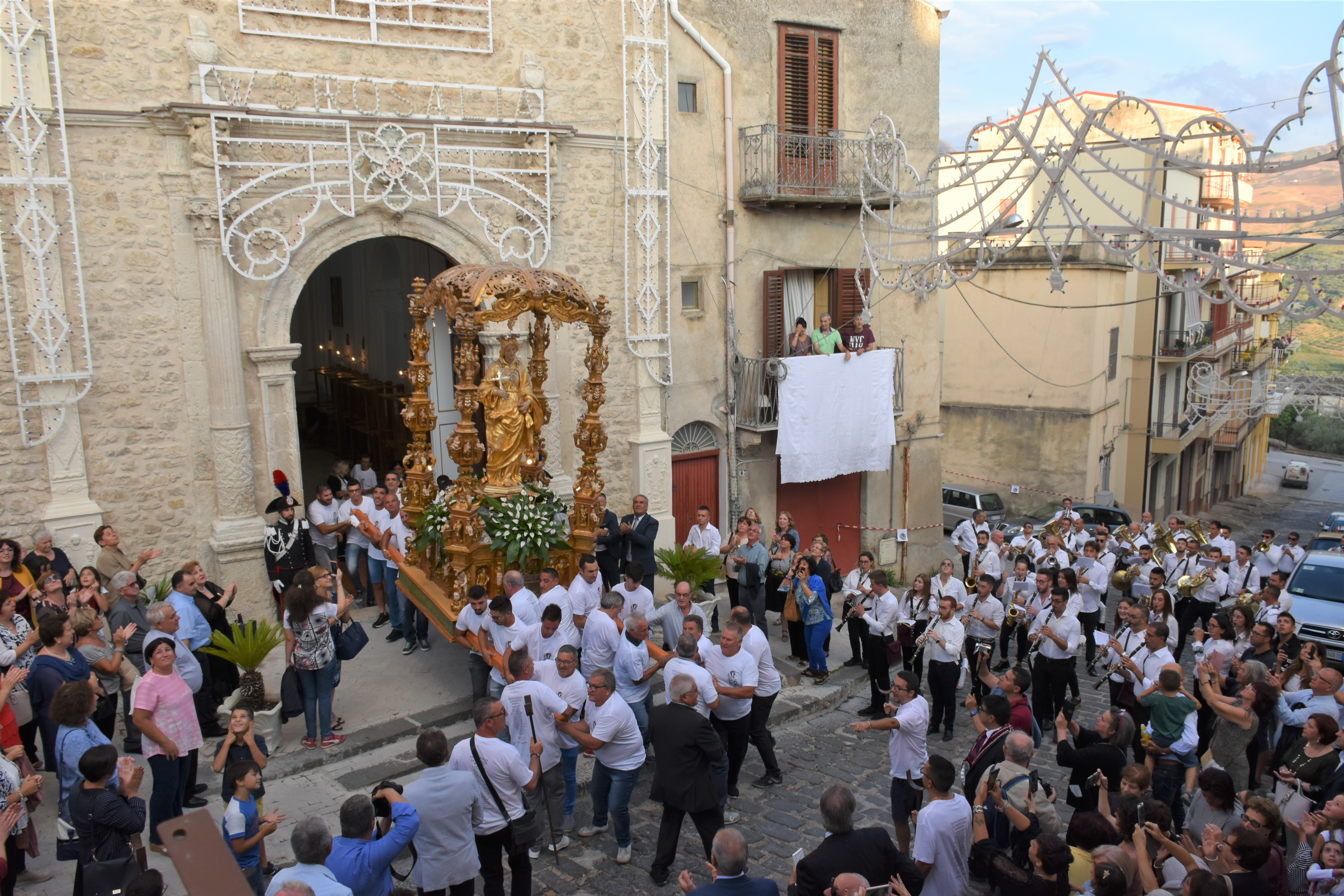
Procession of Saint Rosalia

== Traditions and folklore ==
In August 1998, the folklore group "Bivona Folk" was formed, affiliated with the Italian Federation of Popular Traditions; in July 2010, the Cultural Association "Sikania Folk" was founded, which in 2011 and 2012 organized the International Folklore Festival "Pesca d'Oro".

The Bivona folklore groups perform in traditional Sicilian costumes during local festivals and in various traditional Sicilian music performances, sometimes at events of national and international significance

Nickname

The people of Bivona have a nickname: they are called judè (Jews), both due to the ancient presence of a Jewish community from the last centuries of the Middle Ages and because of a now-lost tradition of carrying a blackened wooden Crucifix in procession on the first Friday after Easter, prompting residents of neighboring towns to exclaim: "Vivunisi judè, ca doppu 'na simana Lu mittistivu 'ncruci arrè", meaning "Bivona Jews, who put Him back on the cross after a week".

== Institutions, organizations, and associations ==
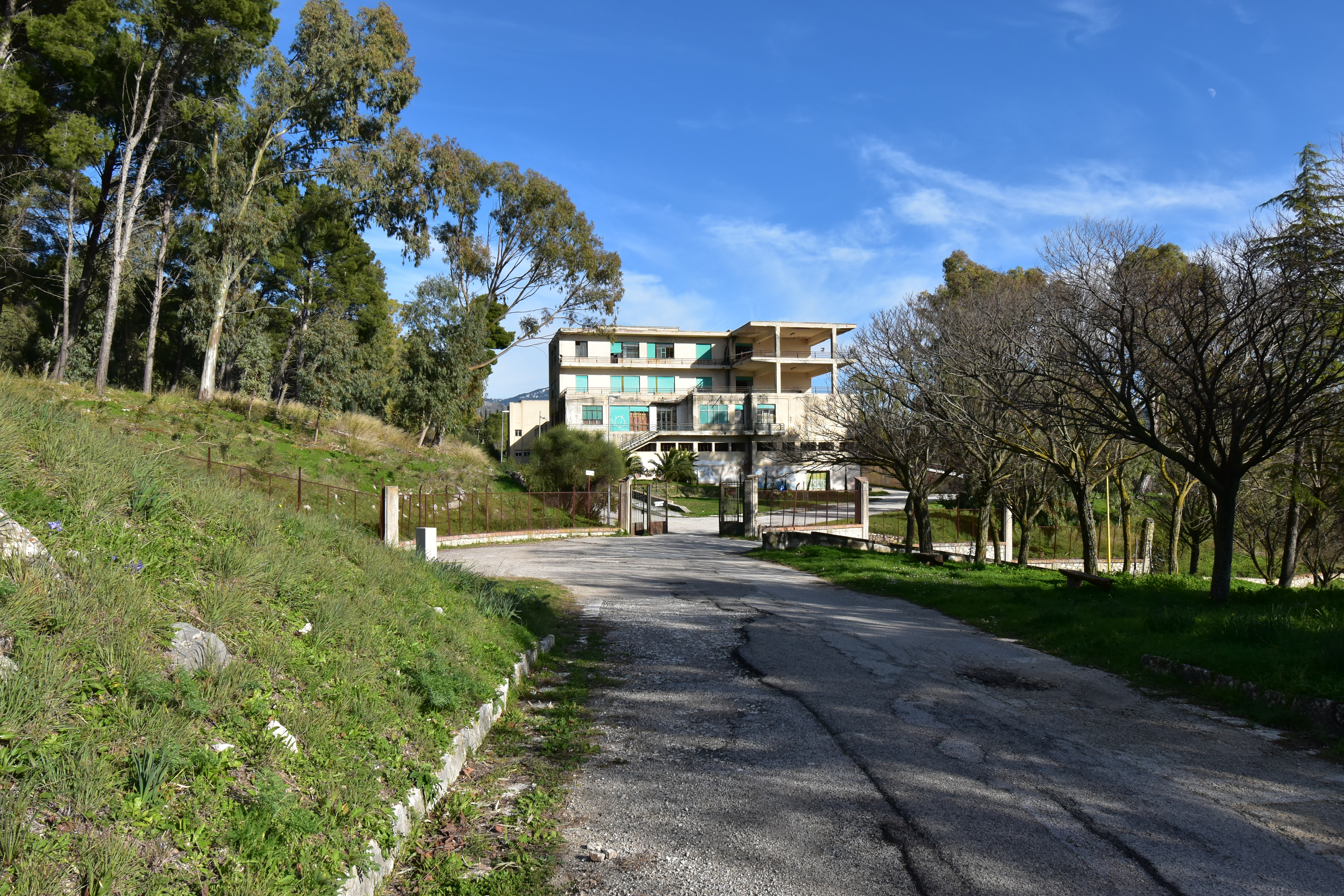
Bivona hospital, the headquarters of the ASL health district

The presence of offices, services, schools, sacred buildings, organizations, and associations of provincial and regional importance confirms the role of Bivona as an administrative center of the Agrigento hinterland, a role it has held since it was designated the capital of the Bourbon district in 1812.

Regarding healthcare, since the 16th century, Bivona has been equipped with hospital facilities: in 1540, with the support of the municipal Senate, the Ospedale degli Incurabili was founded near the Church of San Bartolomeo. The only remnant of that building is the name of the street, called "Via Ospedale."

In 1936, a hospital was built in the higher parts of the town: the facility soon became a tracomatosario, a place for treating trachoma, a disease that was prevalent in Sicily, especially in the post-World War II period, primarily affecting children. The building now houses the Bivona Health District, part of the Provincial Health Authority No. 1 of Agrigento.

== Culture ==
=== Education ===
==== Libraries ====
The "Romano Cammarata" municipal library, named after a local scholar, is located in the former Augustinian nuns' convent in Piazza San Giovanni. It holds a collection of over 8,000 volumes, supplemented by more than 1,000 audiovisual materials.

==== Schools ====
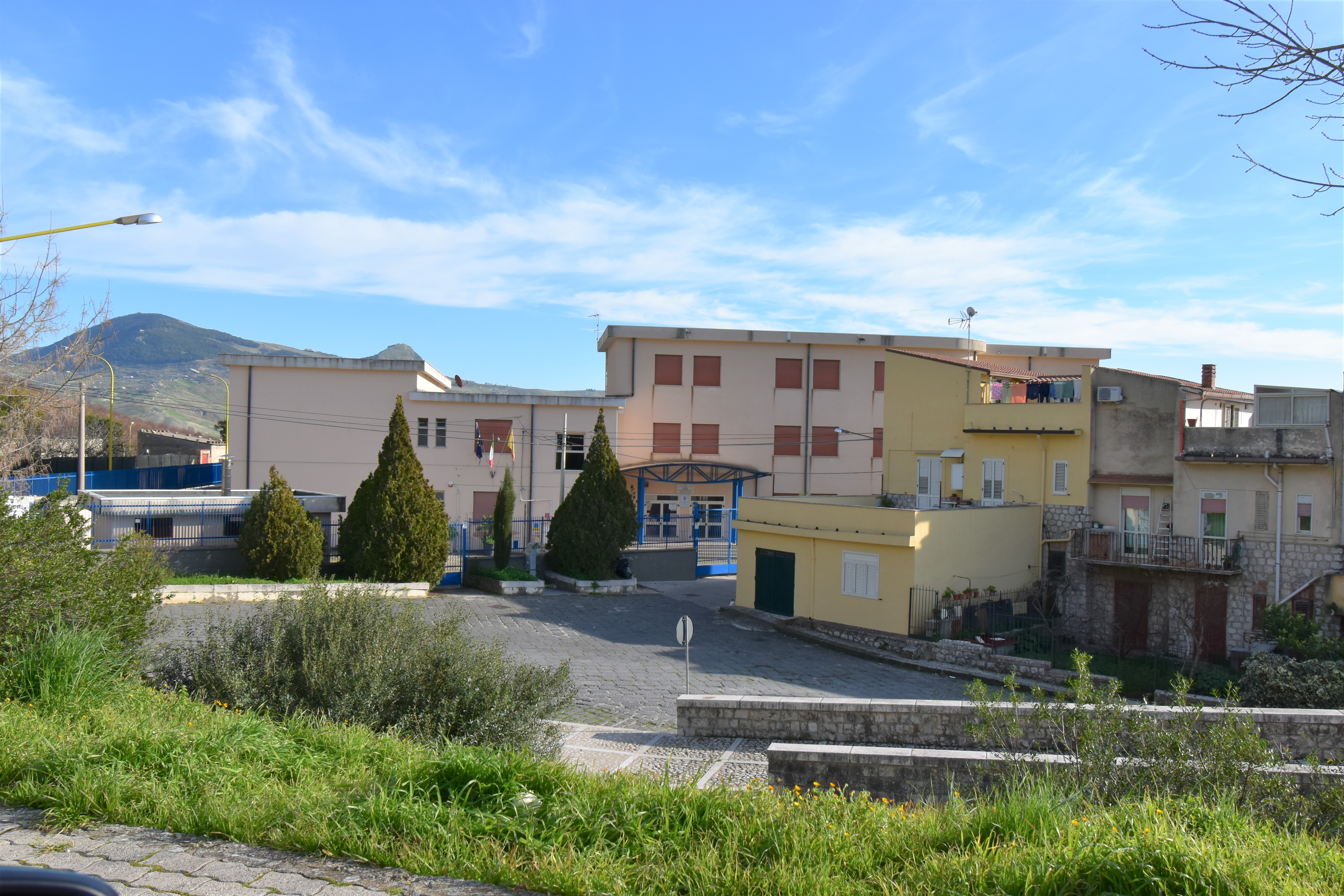
The Luigi Pirandello State High School

The presence of the Jewish community and, later, the Jesuits ensured a continuous process of cultural growth in Bivona starting from the 16th century. In 1767, the Jesuits were expelled from Sicily, and a few years later, the school system was directly managed by the Bourbon government, which ordered the establishment of a dedicated school in each of the island's convents: this was fortunate for Bivona, which at the time was home to four convents. Under the Savoy government, a high school was established in Bivona by decree of Garibaldi in 1860; however, it opened only on 9 February 1863.

During the Fascist period, the institution was replaced by a technical institute (named after Francesco Crispi, a native of the area), where Latin was also taught. The classical high school was activated in the late 1940s through the collaboration of Bivona lawyer Edmondo Trizzino, the Minister of Public Education Guido Gonella, and the Brescian lawyer Ludovico Montini, brother of Giovanni Battista Montini, the future Pope Paul VI. The Bivona state high school, named after Luigi Pirandello, gained autonomy on 18 March 1953; in the late 1970s, a commercial technical institute was established; in the 1990s, new high school courses were introduced, including the bio-socio-health course, unique in Italy, replaced in 2011 by the new socio-health course with "optics" and "dental technology" specializations. The "Lorenzo Panepinto" secondary education institute offers technical education (economic and technological sectors) and vocational education (hospitality and catering services, and industry and crafts, based in the neighboring municipality of Cianciana).

==== Universities ====
Bivona was home to a branch campus of the University of Palermo for forestry and environmental sciences degrees from the Faculty of Agriculture from 1991 to 2001. It still hosts the herbal techniques degree course from the Faculty of Pharmacy, although enrollments have been closed since the 2004/2005 academic year, and the course will soon be discontinued; the course, logistically managed by the Agrigento Province University Consortium (CUPA), is held in a facility in the neighboring municipality of Santo Stefano Quisquina, which lacks support infrastructure.

==== Museums ====
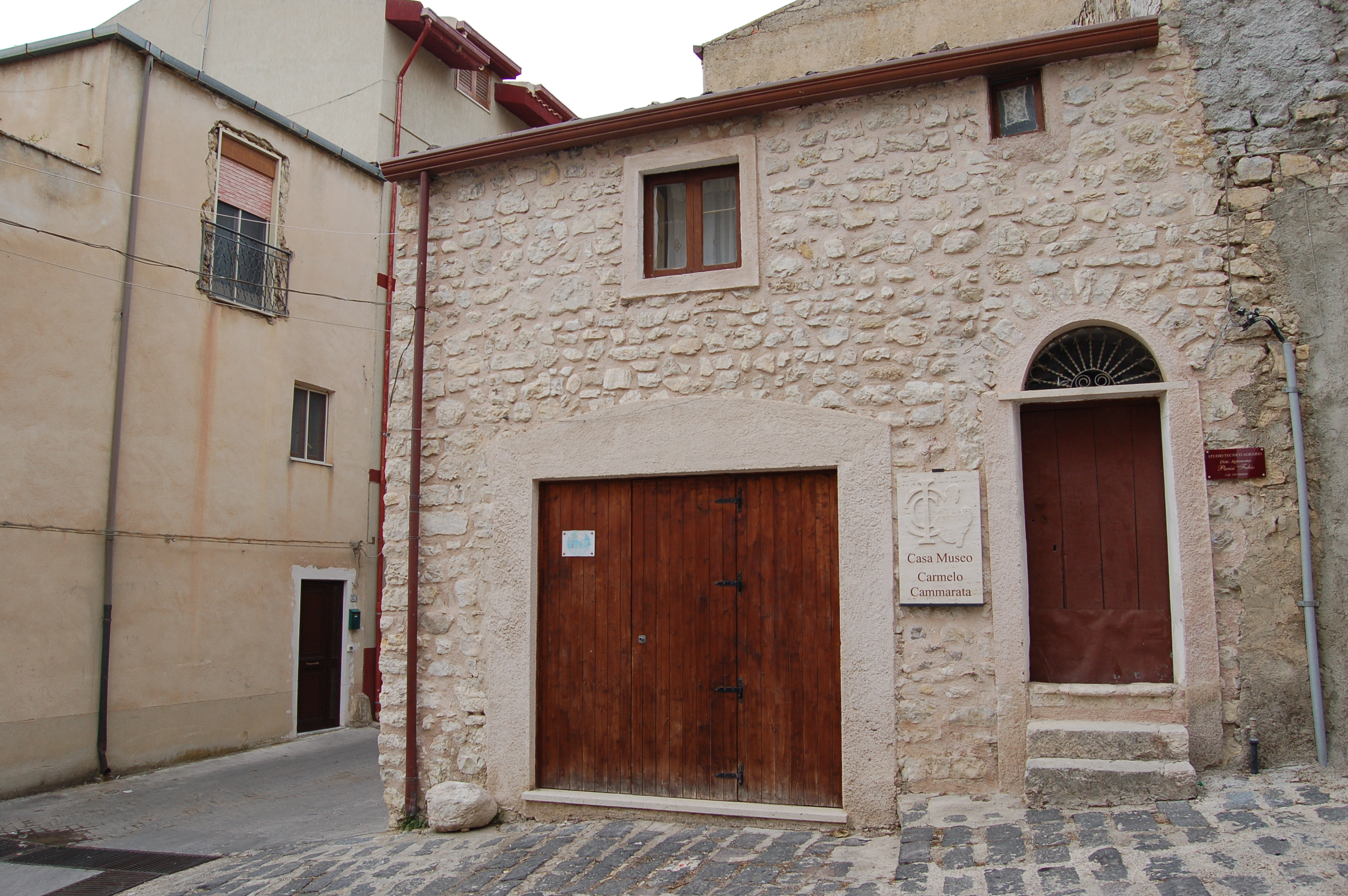
The house of Carmelo Cammarata, now a museum

The Carmelo Cammarata House Museum houses works by the local sculptor (1924–1999), created using techniques typical of Sicilian sculpture.

=== Media ===
The town has no radio stations, as the only Bivona radio, Radio Bivona, has been defunct for years.

Additionally, Bivona is home to the publishing house Cammarata Editore, active since 2001, which publishes fiction and has a series dedicated to multimedia.

Monographs on Bivona

The "Giovanni Meli" middle school, the "Romano Cammarata" municipal library, and the "Leonardo da Vinci" cultural association are responsible for publishing several historical essays, including works by local historian Antonino Marrone, author of Bivona Città Feudale, a two-volume study on the town's history up to 1812 published by Salvatore Sciascia Editore, and various monographs (Il Distretto, il Circondario e il Collegio Elettorale di Bivona (1812-1880), Storia delle Comunità Religiose e degli edifici sacri di Bivona, Ebrei e Giudaismo a Bivona (1428-1547), Bivona dal 1812 al 1881, Il fascio dei lavoratori di Bivona); works by poet and essayist Cesare Sermenghi, author of Mondi minori scomparsi and Il passato e le sue risposte. Another work on Bivona's history is Cenno storico - politico - etnografico di Bivona, published in 1909 by Bivona native Giovan Battista Sedita and reprinted in 1992. On religious topics, there are Il culto di S. Rosalia a Bivona. La Chiesa e il Fercolo by Salvatore Tornatore and Cristianesimo imperfetto by Alessandro De Bono.

In the 2000s, several books set in Bivona were published: Gaetano Marini verificatore di pesi e misure. Bivona 1862 by Pasquale Marchese, Le tribolazioni di un insegnante di ginnasio by Placido Cerri (published in 1872 and reprinted in 2005), Giardino sicano. Bivona come metafora by Salvatore Guida, and I bambini della Croce bianca by Carmelo Miduri.

=== Art ===
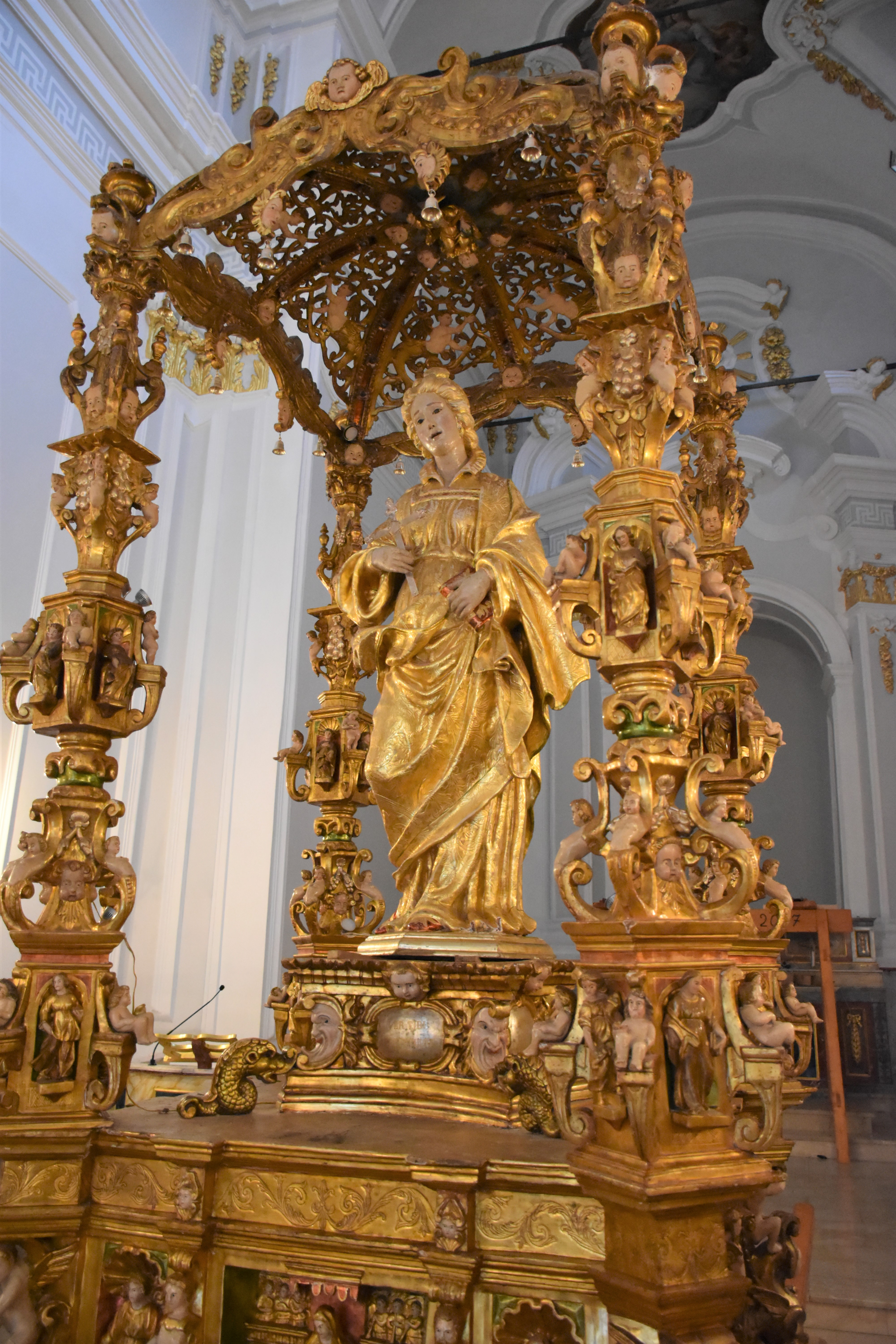
The 17th-century bier of Saint Rosalia

Bivona is home to artworks belonging to the artistic movements that most influenced and characterized Sicily in past centuries. In painting, notable examples include the canvases and paintings adorning the walls and sacristies of Bivona's many churches: illustrious examples are the paintings by the Zoppo di Ganci in the Church of the Carmine (such as Maria e Sant'Anna from the 17th century), the 18th-century canvas depicting Santa Maria degli Angeli behind the main altar of the Church of the Capuchins (likely by the Flemish painter Ettore Cruzer), or the precious canvases in the Mother Church and the Church of San Paolo. In architecture, the portals of Bivona's churches are exemplary of the various artistic movements that shaped the town's cultural life: from the Chiaramonte Gothic portal, considered one of the most significant remnants of late Gothic architecture in the Sicilian hinterland, to the late Gothic portal of the Church of the Carmine; from the Baroque portal of the Church of Saint Rosalia to the identical style of the Church of San Bartolomeo; from the late Renaissance portal of the Mother Church to the characteristic Baroque portal at the Church of San Paolo.

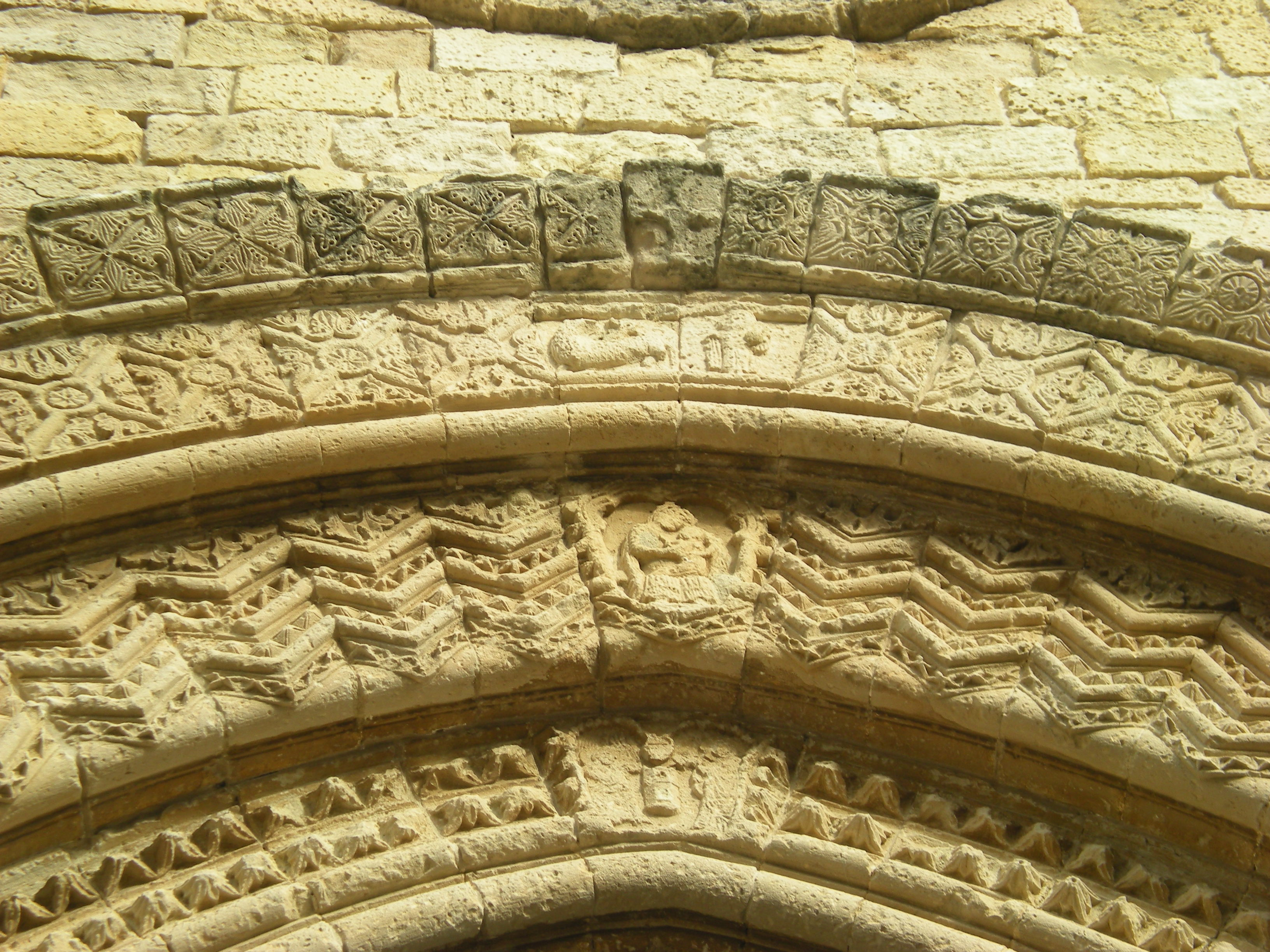
Details of the keystones of the Chiaramontana Gothic Portal

In terms of sculpture, the statues and crucifixes within sacred buildings testify to the economic and cultural prosperity of Bivona in past centuries.

In 1601, the Bivona priest Ruggero Valenti carved the bier of Saint Rosalia: it is a gilded and polychrome wooden bier in the shape of a canopy, topped by a perforated dome and supported by a base with reliefs featuring fantastic figures (the work includes about two hundred fantastic characters); the columns, rich in details and decorations (typical of the late Mannerist style), seem to almost protect the statue of the Santuzza, with delicate features and entirely covered in pure gold. Bivona was the birthplace and workplace of artists renowned regionally, especially in the 16th century. For several years, a summer Art Exhibition (in its fourth edition in 2010) has been organized, featuring various local artists showcasing works in all forms of visual art: painting, sculpture, graphics, ceramics, and photography.

=== Theatre ===
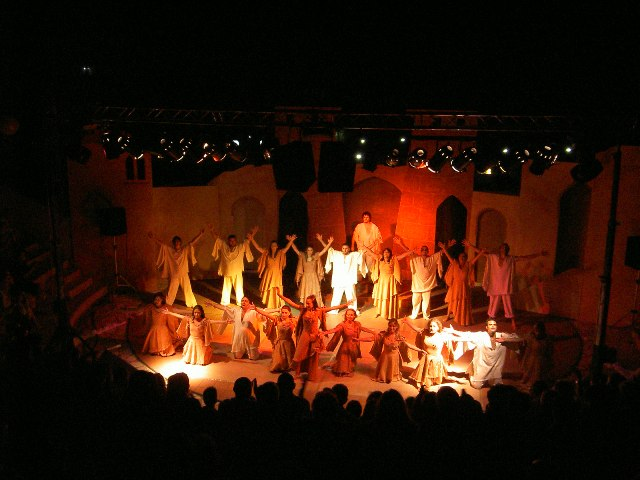
The Bivona Boccascena Association in Dalle Origini all'Inizio

Since 1996, the "City of Bivona" popular theatre festival has been held in Bivona, featuring theatre companies from various parts of Sicily. Since the 1980s, a theatre company, initially called the "Cultural Association Friends of the Show" (ARCAS) and renamed the "Boccascena Cultural Association" in 2003, has staged several musicals directed by Piero Lattuca.

Among local playwrights, notable names include Cesare Sermenghi, Paolo Trizzino (1897–1955) (Il calvario di Pinocchio, performed in 1926 at the Teatro Brancaccio in Rome), and Giuseppe Scilì Bellomo (Bivona, 1951), author of rhyming comedies in dialect.

=== Music ===
Bivona is home to the "City of Bivona" and "Gioacchino Rossini" bands; the local secondary education institute's recorder polyphonic group and saxophone ensemble, which have participated in various regional and national competitions, were also active. Since 2006, the town has hosted the "City of Bivona" philharmonic competition for amateur bands in Sicily.

In August 2010, the region's first public recording studio was inaugurated, located in the former Augustinian nuns’ convent.

=== Cuisine ===
Bivona, my town, the town of the best peaches in the world, a borderland between Palermo and Agrigento

— Alfonso Sabella, from Il Cacciatore di mafiosi, 2008

Local culinary specialties are based on peaches, the symbol of Bivona's agriculture: peach and ricotta cake, biscuits with peach jam, and pasticciotti with peach jam. Other specialties include pasta 'ncasciata (with broccoli, tomato sauce, pecorino cheese, and pieces of lard), froscia (with fresh ricotta, bread, grated cheese, eggs, and calamint), green olive caponata (with salted green olives, onion, celery, garlic, salt, black pepper, oregano, raisins, olive oil, and vinegar), li sfinci (made with durum wheat flour, yeast, oil, and hot water), fruit pastries, pignolata, and cubata (a mixture of almonds, sugar, honey, and cinnamon).

=== Events ===
==== Peach Festival ====
Bivona's main event is the Peach Festival, held since 1985. The event takes place over three days in the second half of August, featuring numerous food and wine stands and aiming to promote the quality of the local fruit, grown in the municipality and the Monti Sicani area. The Bivona Peach was showcased for its exceptional qualities among the excellent products in the Bio-Mediterranean Cluster at Expo 2015.

== Human geography ==
=== Urban planning ===
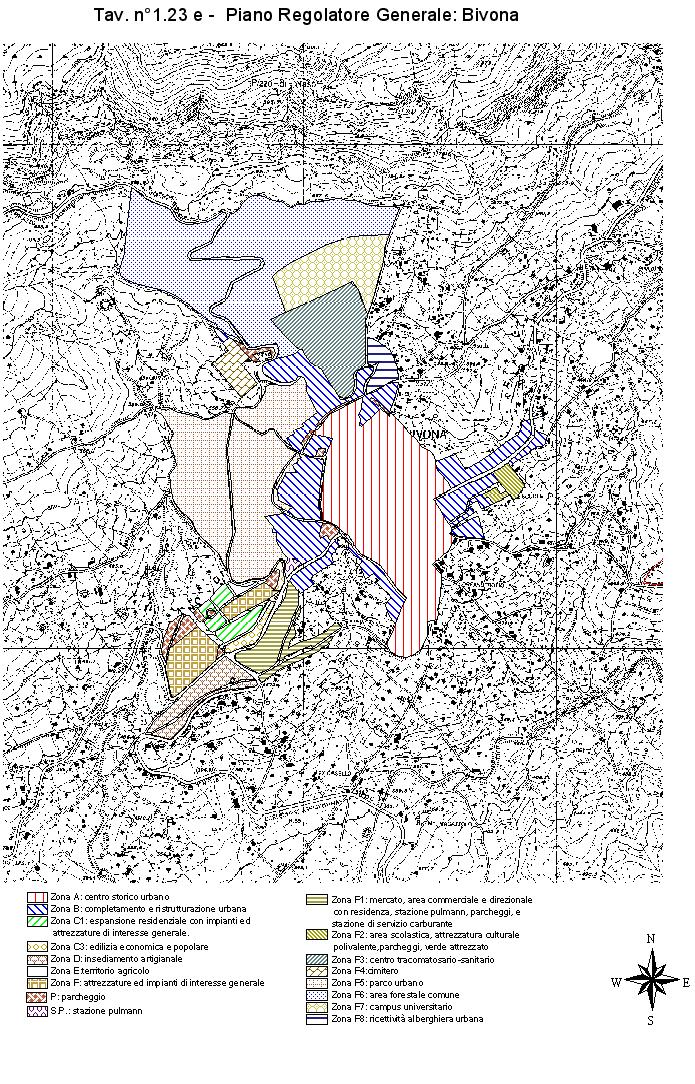
General Regulatory Plan of the Municipality of Bivona

The hilly location of the town at the foot of the Sicani Mountains protected its inhabitants from malaria and other diseases for centuries. Additionally, the presence of abundant springs and waterways enabled agriculture and pastoralism.

In the medieval period, after its enfeoffment, Bivona became a terra cum turri: the inhabited area was fortified and equipped with four gates, and a castle (or watchtower) was built to the northeast of the settlement. In the 14th century, the urban structure, with an irregular layout, was situated between the Savuco and Ferri springs, featuring several squares and numerous green spaces owned by religious communities and wealthier families.

In the 16th century, due to significant immigration, the town expanded southward, achieving a roughly rhomboidal urban configuration that persisted until the 19th century. The new districts were characterized by linearly arranged blocks, most of them in a "spine" layout. Their names—around forty by the end of the century—served as actual reference points, as it was not customary to name individual streets. At other times, churches and sacred shrines served as landmarks.

Due to a sharp demographic decline in the 18th century, the urban fabric deteriorated, and numerous churches and other buildings collapsed. However, bridges were built over the Alba River, which crossed part of the town.

Street naming and house numbering began after 1840. In the same years, the urban section of the National Road (now Via Roma) connecting Palermo and Girgenti was constructed, along with the New Road (now Via Lorenzo Panepinto) on the Alba River's bed, the expansion of Piazza San Giovanni, and the improvement of other streets; a cemetery was also opened. In the 20th century, Bivona began expanding eastward and westward, with the construction of apartment buildings on Via Porta Palermo and public housing near the Santa Filomena area. Numerous villas were also built, especially in the eastern part of Bivona's territory, toward Santo Stefano Quisquina. Since 1999, the Municipality of Bivona has had a General Regulatory Plan that identifies seismic and historical-artistic-monumental constraints and defines homogeneous territorial zones by purpose. The surface area of the historic town center measures 198,640 m^{2}.

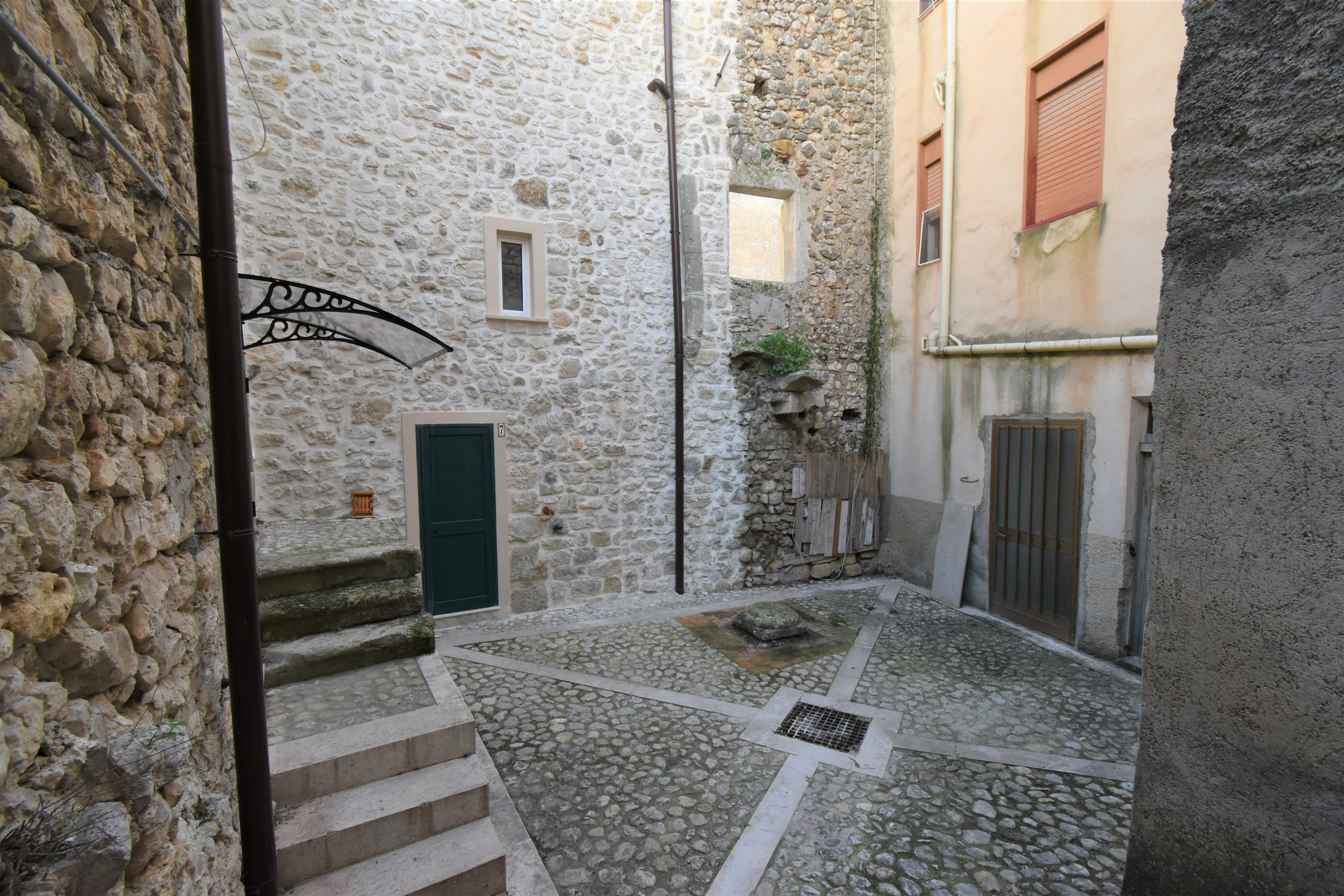
Canzeri Courtyard, within the ancient Jewish quarter

=== Historical subdivisions ===
Districts in Bivona are not administratively recognized and are considered only from a historical perspective. The main historical districts of Bivona are: the Savuco district; the Fontana Pazza district; the Nadaro district, whose name likely derives from the Arabic term Nadarà, meaning "panoramic place," due to its position overlooking much of the town; the Santa Rosalia district, one of the oldest built extra moenia; the Santa Chiara district; the San Domenico district, once home to the Jewish quarter; and the Garitani district, named after a garita, a watchtower located on the southwestern side of the city walls.

=== Hamlets ===
In the past, the municipality of Bivona administered the hamlet of Borgo San Ferdinando (now Filaga), which was assigned to the municipality of Prizzi in 1859.

The special area of the Barico Basin, recorded by the ISTAT among the localities of the municipality of Bivona, includes the artificial reservoir near the Castello Dam, which also falls within the municipality of Alessandria della Rocca.

As of the 15th ISTAT general population and housing census (2011), Bivona's territory is divided as follows:

Name	Type	Population	Altitude	Coordinates
Bivona	Municipal capital	3,661	503	37°37′06″N 13°26′26″E
-	Scattered houses	221	-	-
Total	1 populated place	3,882	64/1436	

== Economy ==
Thanks to widespread peach cultivation, the leading sector of Bivona's economy is agriculture, employing 990 workers according to ISTAT data from the 2001 Census; industry employs 49; commerce, 71; crafts, 57; and institutions, 15.

=== Agriculture ===
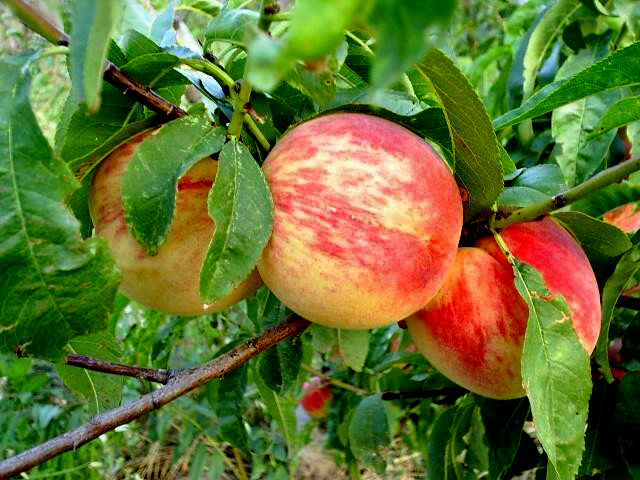
Bivona white peach

The main agricultural product of Bivona is the peach, known as Montagnola or Pescabivona, earning the town the nickname "City of Peaches".

This variety is medium-sized, with firm white flesh, often streaked with pinkish-red veins. Its flavor is sweet and aromatic, and its fragrance stands out compared to most peaches produced elsewhere in Sicily and Italy.

In addition to peach cultivation, there is production of olives, almonds, and grapes, as well as animal husbandry of cattle, sheep, and pigs, producing "Sicani Mountains meat" and typical Sicilian cheeses, including:

- "tuma," a semi-cooked hard cheese made from raw whole sheep's milk, unaged, with a spicy flavor;
- "fiore sicano," a raw-milk cheese typical of the Sicani area;
- "piacentino" (meaning "pleasant"), very similar to pecorino, also produced in the area;
- ricotta, produced throughout the surrounding area.

Bivona is part of the Sicani Mountains Rural District, which includes several municipalities in the provinces of Agrigento, Caltanissetta, and Palermo.

Bivona's territory is also included in the production area of the Ribera Orange PDO.

=== Crafts ===
In the crafts sector, the traditional production of wooden chairs (the so-called Bivona Chair) is notable.

=== Industry ===
According to a 2003 analysis by ISTAT based on Local Labour Systems (SLL), the agricultural industry provides Bivona's highest economic yield.

In the first half of the 19th century, the Balata sulfur mine was active, owned by the Duke of Ferrandina, but later abandoned.

=== Services ===
According to the 2003 SLL analysis, in the "Business Services" and "Cultural and Environmental Goods and Services" sectors, Bivona's SLL is rated at a medium-high level.

=== Tourism ===
Several initiatives and projects, such as the Itinerarium Rosaliae and the construction of the Mare-Monti road, aim to promote the tourism sector; in 2013, the municipal tourism council was established.

== Infrastructure and transport ==
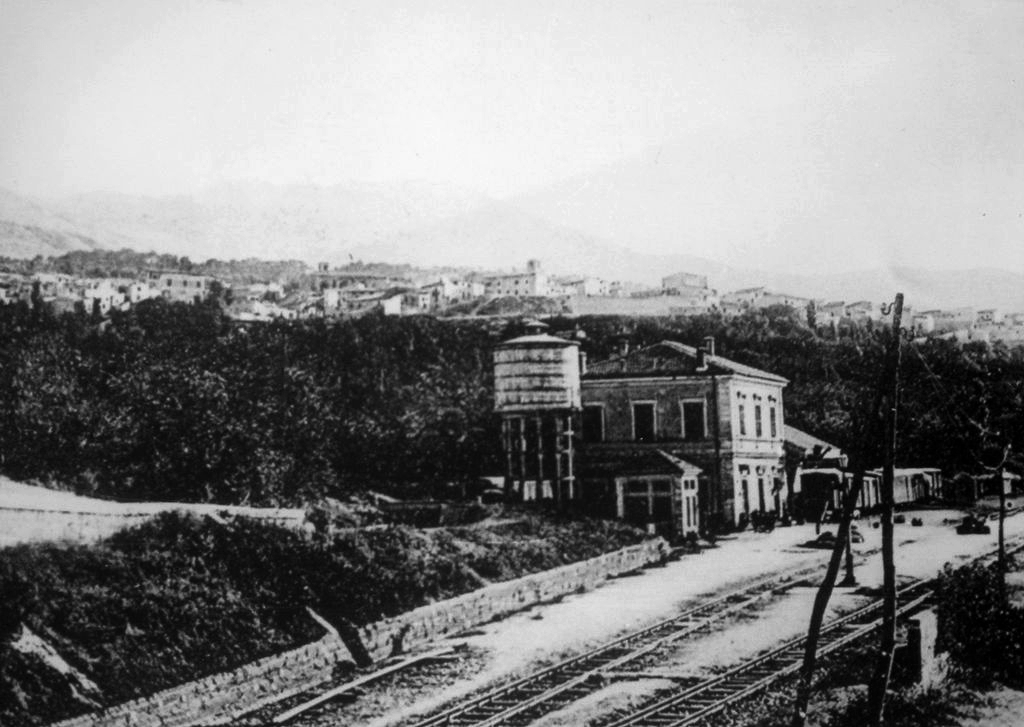
The old Bivona station in a historical photo

Traveling from Bivona to Ribera, twenty-five kilometers away, meant following a sometimes extremely steep path, five times longer, and fording a river a dozen times

— Denis Mack Smith, from Storia della Sicilia medievale e moderna, 1973

Bivona, located at the crossroads between the road connecting Sciacca to Castronovo di Sicilia and the one linking Agrigento to Corleone, has been a mandatory stop for travelers for centuries.

=== Roads ===
The main road axis crossing the municipal territory is the State Road 118 Corleonese Agrigentina. The road passes through Bivona's urban center along Via Porta Palermo, Piazza Guglielmo Marconi, and Via Roma, continuing toward the Scaldamosche and Santa Filomena districts.

Bivona is also served by several provincial roads:

- Provincial Road 34, connecting it to State Road 386 of Ribera at the Tamburello junction in the territory of Calamonaci;
- Provincial Road 15 Bivona-Palazzo Adriano, crossing the mountainous territory of Monte delle Rose and the hills at the border between the provinces of Palermo and Agrigento;
- Provincial road to Ribera.

=== Railways ===
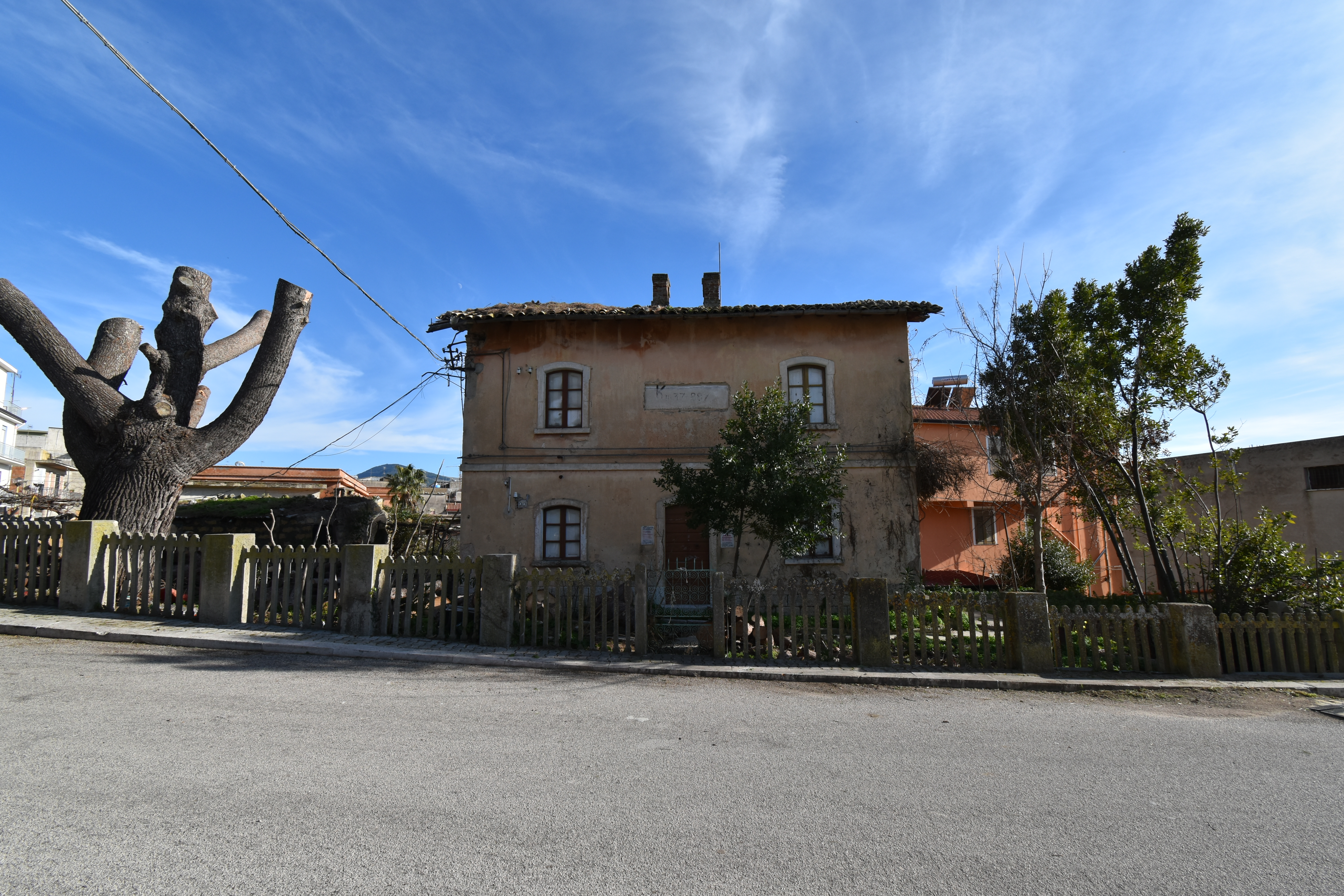
Railway crossing of the disused Lercara-Magazzolo railway in Via Fabrizio De André

Until the late 1950s, the municipality was served by the narrow-gauge railway Lercara-Filaga-Magazzolo, built by the Italian State Railways starting in 1912 to connect the sulfur mining areas of Lercara Friddi and Cianciana to the Castelvetrano-Porto Empedocle Railway along Sicily's southern coast, reaching port loading facilities. The final section of the railway, between Bivona and Alessandria della Rocca, was inaugurated on 1 September 1924. The railway was used for both mineral and passenger transport. The Bivona railway station service was suspended in October 1959 and permanently closed in 1961.

The Bivona station was located in the Santa Filomena area, southwest of the town. The railway is now in poor condition: tracks have been removed in many places, the level crossing south of the town is in ruins, and the one in the Antinoro district has been sold off.

== Administration ==
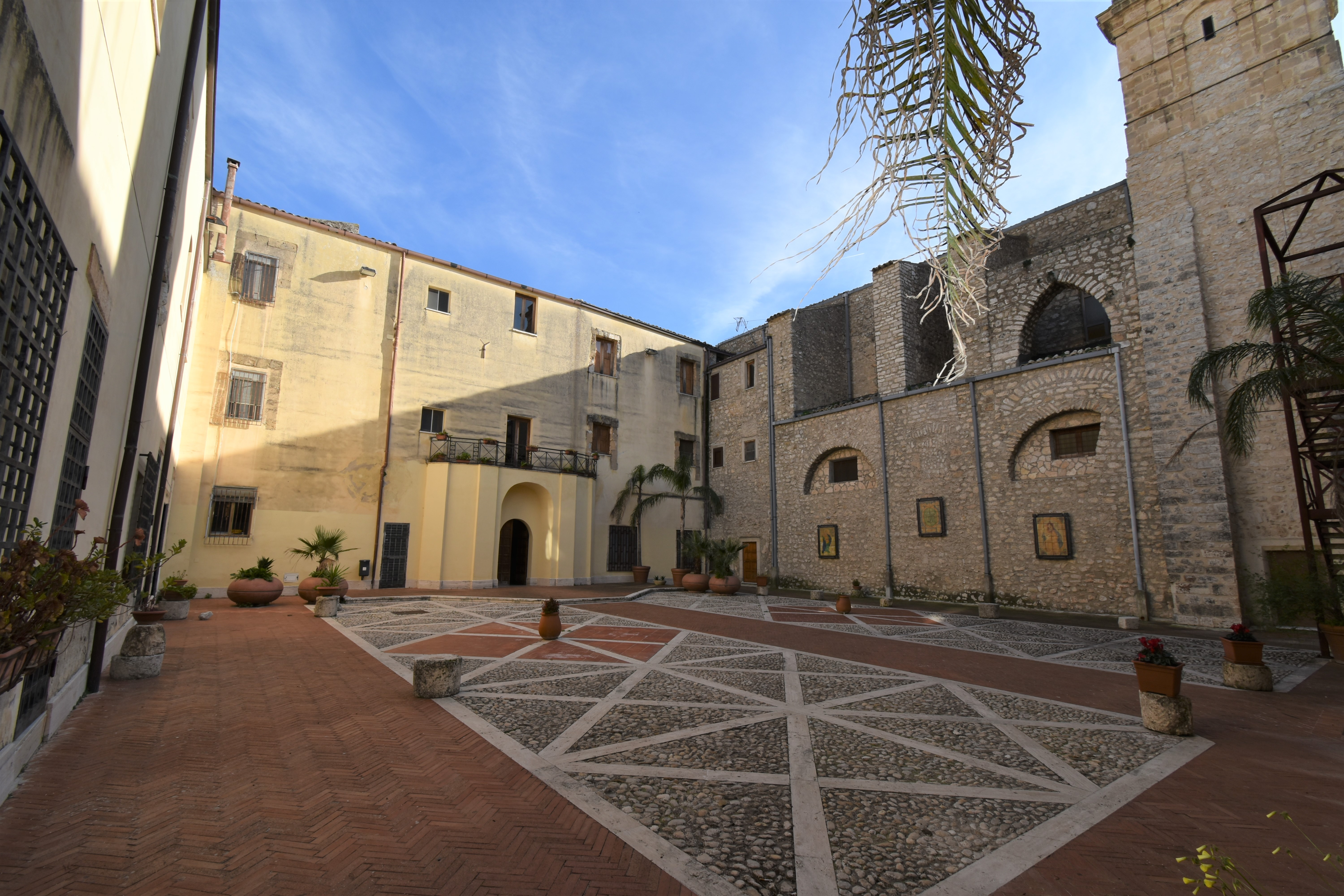
The atrium of the Municipal Palace, formerly the Jesuit College

=== Twin towns ===
Bivona was twinned with the Val Trompia municipality of Collebeato (Lombardy) in 2004–2005: the twinning aimed to promote their respective local peach varieties during related events.

=== Other administrative information ===
The municipality of Bivona is part of the following supra-municipal organizations:

- Agricultural region No. 1 (southern slope of the Sicani Mountains),
- Union of municipalities "Platani - Quisquina - Magazzolo",
- Territorial pact "Magazzolo Platani" and PIT 23 area "Magazzolo, Platani, and Sicani Mountains of Agrigento",
- Local Action Group "Terre di Halykos" and memorandum of understanding for the "Platani River Park".

== Sports ==
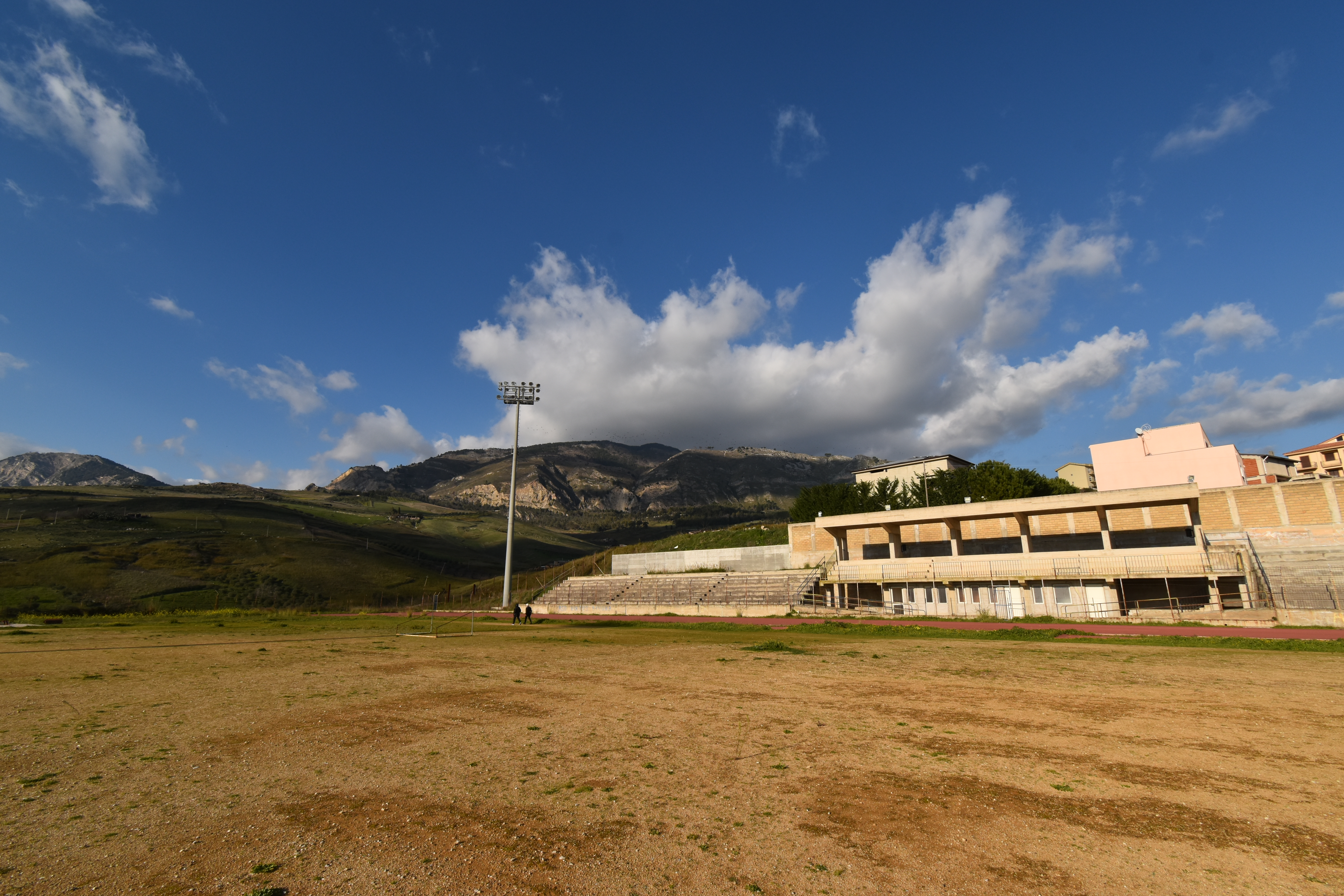
The Bivona municipal stadium, with a view of the mountainous landscape

The main local soccer team is ASD Bivona 2020, competing in the Terza Categoria (Agrigento group) in the 2020/2021 season. ASD Virtus Bivona, which competed in regional-level championships, was active until the 2017/2018 season.

=== Sports facilities ===
The "Renato Traina" municipal stadium, located in the southwestern part of the town near the Santa Filomena area, is equipped with lighting, a covered grandstand on the east side, and an athletics track, which is not approved as it is shorter than the standard 400 meters.

== See also ==
- Second case of Sciacca

== Bibliography ==
- Modeo, Simona; Congiu, Marina; Santagati, Luigi, eds. (2013). "Dal tardo antico ai Musulmani: risultati dei Surveys a Gela e Agrigento sul cambiamento del sistema insediativo" [From Late Antiquity to the Muslims: Results of Surveys in Gela and Agrigento on Changes in the Settlement System]. La Sicilia del IX secolo tra Bizantini e Musulmani. Atti del IX Convegno di studi (Caltanissetta, 12-13 maggio 2012) [Sicily in the 9th Century between Byzantines and Muslims. Proceedings of the 9th Study Conference (Caltanissetta, May 12–13, 2012)]. Caltanissetta-Roma: Salvatore Sciascia editore. pp. 69–75. ISBN 978-88-8241-420-7. Archived from the original on 1 February 2017.
- Carmela Cannella; Giuseppa Trizzino; Carmela Spallino, eds. (1986–1987). Sapori di casa nostra [Flavors of Our Home]. Preface and introduction by Salvatore Calafiore. Santo Stefano Quisquina: Scuola media statale «Giovanni Meli».
- Di Salvo, Paolo (2010). Il primo catasto fondiario urbano di Bivona (1838) [The First Urban Land Registry of Bivona (1838)]. Bivona: Comune di Bivona.
- Marrone, Antonino (1987). Bivona città feudale voll. I-II [Bivona Feudal City, Vols. I-II]. Caltanissetta-Roma: Salvatore Sciascia Editore.
- Marrone, Antonino (1996). Il Distretto, il Circondario e il Collegio Elettorale di Bivona (1812-1880) [The District, the Administrative Division, and the Electoral College of Bivona (1812-1880)]. Bivona: Comune di Bivona.
- Marrone, Antonino (1997). Storia delle Comunità Religiose e degli edifici sacri di Bivona [History of Religious Communities and Sacred Buildings of Bivona]. Bivona: Comune di Bivona.
- Marrone, Antonino (2000). Ebrei e Giudaismo a Bivona (1428-1547) [Jews and Judaism in Bivona (1428-1547)]. Bivona: Circolo Leonardo da Vinci - Bivona.
- Marrone, Antonino (2001). Bivona dal 1812 al 1881 [Bivona from 1812 to 1881]. Bivona: Comune di Bivona.
- Perconti, Piero (1995). Studio geologico–idrogeologico–geomorfologico del bacino sotteso "Diga Castello-Fiume-Magazzolo" [Geological-Hydrogeological-Geomorphological Study of the "Castello-Fiume-Magazzolo Dam" Basin]. Bivona: Biblioteca Comunale di Bivona.
- Pupello, Maria Pia (1996). Lineamenti floristici del territorio di Bivona [Floristic Features of the Bivona Territory]. Bivona: Biblioteca Comunale di Bivona.
- Sabella, Alfonso (2008). Cacciatore di mafiosi [Mafia Hunter]. Milano: Mondadori. ISBN 978-88-04-57715-7.
- Sedita, Giovan Battista (1909). Cenno storico-politico-etnografico di Bivona [Historical-Political-Ethnographic Notes on Bivona]. Bivona.
- Tornatore, Salvatore (2009). Il culto di S. Rosalia a Bivona. La Chiesa e il Fercolo [The Cult of St. Rosalia in Bivona: The Church and the Processional Float]. Bivona: Comune di Bivona.
- Trizzino, Marco (2013). "Radici mediterranee. Il toponimo Bivona" [Mediterranean Roots: The Toponym Bivona]. RIOn. Rivista Italiana di Onomastica. XIX (1). Roma: Società Editrice Romana: 95–121.
- Trizzino, Paolo (1996). La parlata di Bivona nella dialettologia siciliana [The Bivona Dialect in Sicilian Dialectology]. Roma: Ciuffa Editore.
