= Castello della Pietra d'Amico =

Castle in Alessandria della Rocca, Italy

- Alessandria della Rocca, Sicily, Italy
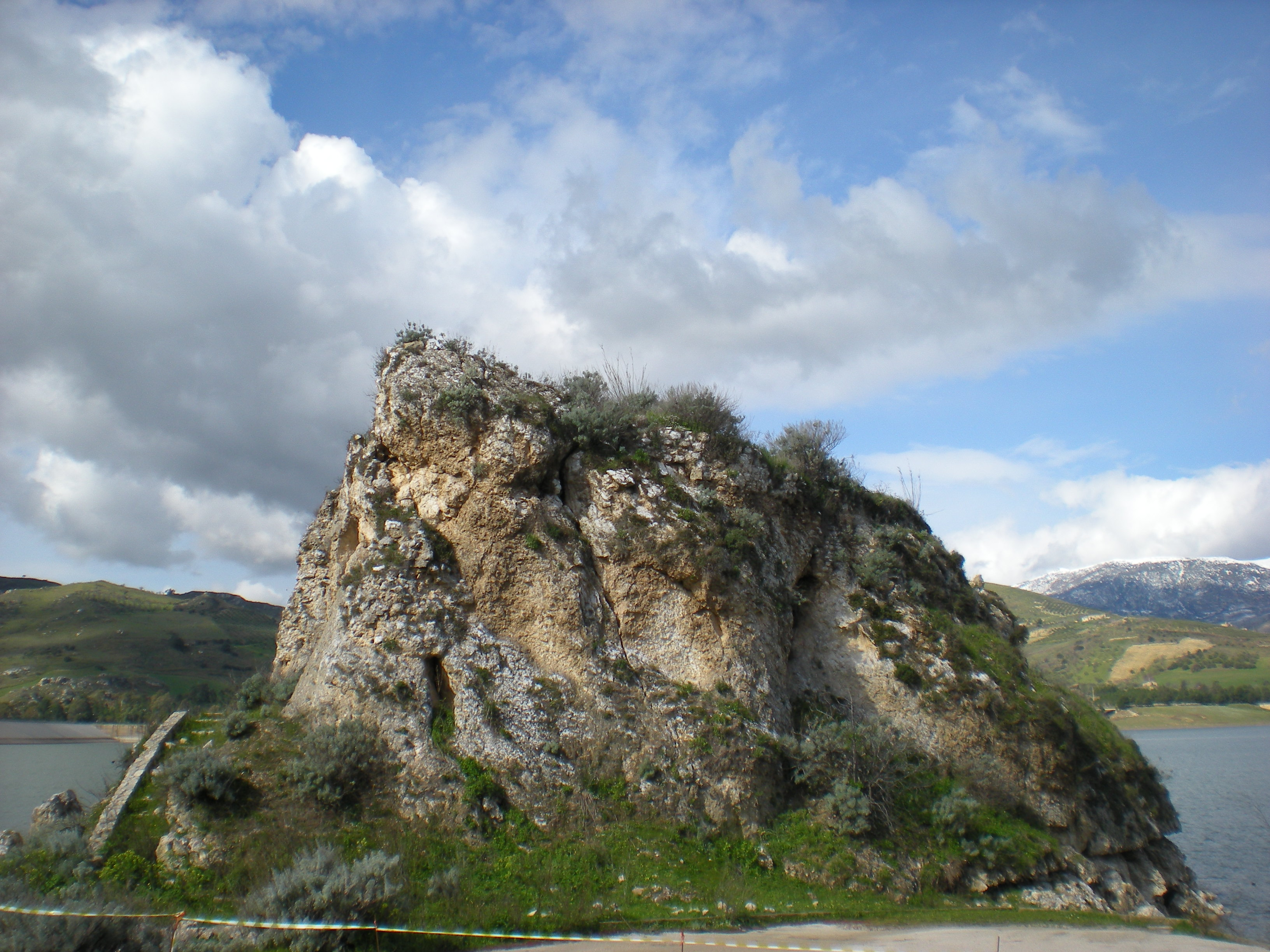
- Pietra d'Amico, on which the castle was built

Site information
- Type: Castle
- Open to the public: Yes
- Condition: Sparse remains

Location
- Coordinates: 37°34′43.5″N 13°25′5.9″E

Site history
- Built: 14th century

The Castello della Pietra d'Amico was a 14th-century castle in Alessandria della Rocca, Sicily, southern Italy. Today, very little remains of the structure, since part of the rock on which it was built collapsed.

== History ==
The first structure on the site of the Castello della Pietra d'Amico was possibly built during the Byzantine period. The site was eventually taken over by the Saracens, before being destroyed in the 13th century.

The castle itself was built in the 14th century, and it probably consisted of a square tower and a rock-hewn silo. In 1542, it was sold to Don Nicholas Barresi, who founded the municipality of Alessandria della Rocca.

Part of the rock on which the castle was built collapsed over time, destroying most of the structure in the process. Today, all that remains are a few parts of its walls and staircases. The site is abandoned but is accessible to the public.

In the 1980s, the area around the castle was flooded by the Lago di Magazzolo following the construction of a dam. Before the flooding, the area was excavated and pottery, tools and shreds were found. These remains probably originated from a small settlement that had developed near the castle.
