= Lago di Magazzolo =

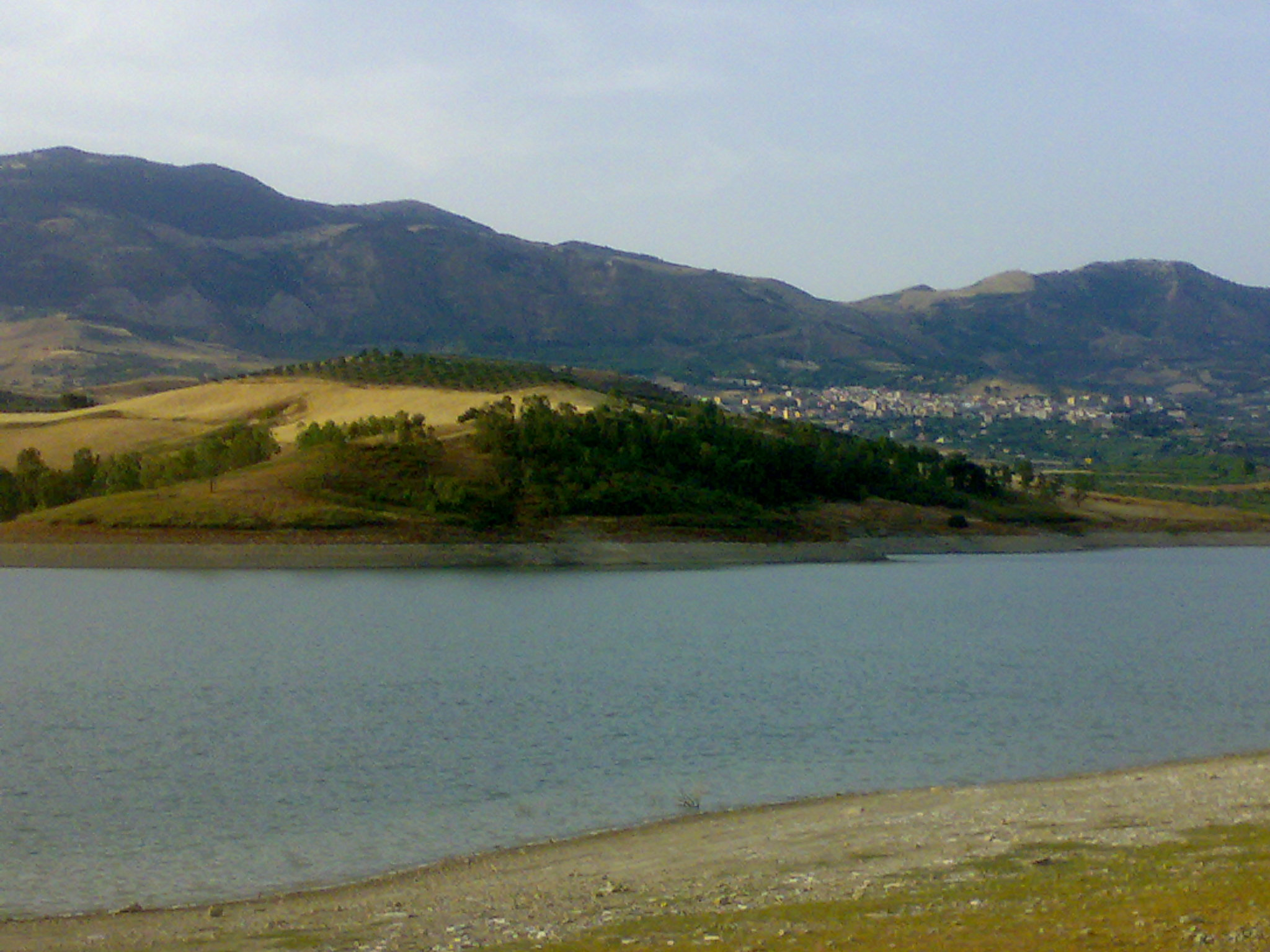

- Location within Sicily
- Location: Province of Agrigento, Sicily
- Coordinates: 37.581°N 13.417°E
- Type: reservoir
- Primary inflows: Magazzolo
- Basin countries: Italy
- Dam: Diga Castello

Lago di Magazzolo, or Lago Castello, is a lake in the Province of Agrigento, Sicily, Italy.

The ruins of the Castello della Pietra d'Amico are located near the lake.
