= To Each His Own =

To Each His Own may refer to:

== Film ==
- To Each His Own (1946 film), an American drama film starring Olivia de Havilland
- We Still Kill the Old Way (Italian: A ciascuno il suo; lit. 'To each his own'), a 1967 Italian film starring Gian Maria Volonte adapting the Sciascia novel
- To Each His Own (2017 film), a Japanese film starring Sota Fukushi
- To Each His Own Cinema, a 2007 film

== Music ==
- "To Each His Own" (Jay Livingston and Ray Evans song), 1946
- "To Each His Own" (Faith, Hope & Charity song), 1975
- To Each His Own (album), a 1968 album by Frankie Laine

== Other ==
- Suum cuique, a Latin expression meaning to each his own
- To Each His Own (novel), a 1966 novel by Leonardo Sciascia

== See also ==
- Jedem das Seine, a German translation of the Latin suum cuique, meaning to each his own
- To Each, Her Own, a 2018 French film directed by Myriam Aziza
