= Carini (surname) =

Carini is an Italian surname. Notable people with the surname include:

== Sport ==
- Angela Carini (born 1998), Italian boxer
- Bruno Carini (1912–1945), French racing cyclist
- Fabián Carini (born 1979), Uruguayan footballer
- Filippo Carini (born 1990), Italian footballer
- Giacomo Carini (born 1997), Italian swimmer
- Piero Carini (1921–1957), Italian racing driver

== Other ==
- Antonio Carini (1872–1950), Italian physician, bacteriologist, and professor
- Giacinto Carini 1821–1880), Italian politician and patriot
- Isidoro Carini (1843–1895), Italian religious, teacher, historian and palaeographer
- Maddalena Carini (1917–1998), Italian Roman Catholic and founder of the Famiglia dell'Ave Maria
- Wayne Carini (born 1951), American car restorer and TV personality
