= The Day of the Owl (film) =

1968 film by Damiano Damiani

- Italian film poster
- Italian: Il giorno della civetta
- Directed by: Damiano Damiani
- Screenplay by: Ugo Pirro; Damiano Damiani
- Based on: The Day of the Owl by Leonardo Sciascia
- Produced by: Ermanno Donati; Luigi Carpentieri
- Starring: Claudia Cardinale; Franco Nero; Lee J. Cobb; Gaetano Cimarosa; Nehemiah Persoff; Serge Reggiani
- Cinematography: Tonino Delli Colli
- Edited by: Nino Baragli
- Music by: Giovanni Fusco
- Production companies: Panda Cinematografica; Les Films Corona; Corona Cinematografica
- Distributed by: Euro International Films
- Release dates: 17 February 1968 (Italy); 7 May 1969 (France)
- Running time: 108 minutes
- Countries: Italy; France
- Language: Italian
- Box office: ₤1.335 billion

The Day of the Owl (Italian: Il giorno della civetta, released in the United States as Mafia) is a 1968 crime drama film directed by Damiano Damiani, based on the 1961 novel by Leonardo Sciascia, adapted for the screen by Damiani and Ugo Pirro. It stars Franco Nero, Claudia Cardinale, and Lee J. Cobb. Set in a small Sicilian town, the story follows a Carabinieri chief investigating a murder, hampered by the deep-seated presence of the Mafia that perpetuates a culture of silence.

An Italian and French co-production, the film was shown in competition at the 1968 Berlin International Film Festival and won three David di Donatello Awards: Best Film, Best Actor for Franco Nero, and Best Actress for Claudia Cardinale.

== Plot ==
In Sicily, truck driver Salvatore Colasberna is shot in the morning hours while delivering a load of cement to a highway construction project. The murder takes place within sight of the house of Rosa Nicolosi and her husband. Rosa's husband, who witnessed the crime, disappears shortly after. Carabinieri captain Bellodi, who has been transferred from North Italy only recently, hears that there may be irregularities in the construction of the highway that amount to corruption. It appears that Colasberna was murdered for refusing to cooperate with the local mafia group, led by the influential Don Mariano.

Don Mariano and his acolytes spread rumours that Rosa's husband had shot Colasberna for having an affair with his wife and went into hiding to escape an arrest. A man shows up at Rosa's house, handing her money which allegedly was sent by her husband who found a job in Palermo, but without giving any address. During his inquiries, Bellodi is thwarted by an honour system, where witnesses lie and withhold information out of allegiance to Don Mariano. He resorts to unorthodox strategies of jailing witnesses, forging statements, and confronting witnesses with false accusations by others, even going so far as arresting Don Mariano. In the end, his strategies fail, and he is himself accused of political motives and removed from his position. From the balcony of his house, Don Mariano and his group watch the new captain who has taken Bellodi's place; while the others express their relief that the new police officer appears to be of no danger to them, Don Mariano states with respect, "Bellodi was a man".

== Cast ==
- Franco Nero as Captain Bellodi
- Claudia Cardinale as Rosa Nicolosi
- Lee J. Cobb as Don Mariano Arena
- Tano Cimarosa as Zecchinetta
- Nehemiah Persoff as Pizzuco
- Serge Reggiani as Parrinieddu
- Giovanni Pallavicino as Marshal Mancuso
- Vincenzo Falanga as Colosimo
- Giuseppe Lauricella as La Stella
- Fred Coplan as Brigadier De Santis
- Ugo D'Alessio as Turco
- Ennio Balbo as Martini
- Laura De Marchi as Laura Arena
- Lino Coletta as Scacchi
- Brizio Montinaro as Mancuso's son

== Production ==
In 1967, director Elio Petri adapted Leonardo Sciascia's novel To Each His Own as We Still Kill the Old Way. The film was a box office hit in Italy, which led producers Ermanno Donati and Luigi Carpentieri to green-light the adaptation of another Sciascia novel they had purchased, The Day of the Owl. The script was developed by director Damiano Damiani and Ugo Pirro. Pirro had previously adapted To Each His Own for Petri's film. Damiani and Pirro created a radically different story from the novel, with Pirro explaining that when writing "a script based on a novel, I usually don't respect the book's structure […] To me, the book is a hint: I must try and preserve its message by using a different language." Pirro and Damiani retained the book's famous line where the character of Don Mariano splits humanity into five categories: "men, half-men, pigmies, arse-crawlers, and quackers."

The Day of the Owl was filmed at Incir - De Paolis in Rome and on location in Partinico, Sicily, where Damiani shot most of the film. Assistant director Mino Giarda would state that during filming, the production received anonymous threatening letters when filming in Sicily. Giarda specifically noted that one day someone had fired bullets at a truck carrying the dailies. Girada stated that dialogue in the script that made reference to the complicity between Italy's largest political party and the mafia was the reasoning behind the shooting.

== Release ==
The Day of the Owl was released in Italy on 17 February 1968 where it was distributed by Euro International Films. On the film's initial release, it was labelled as forbidden to minors by the Board of Censors who declared it was banned due to frequent use of profanity, its "harsh and corrosive criticism of institutions" and a lack of a happy ending. This rating was removed later when a few lines were re-dubbed. The film grossed a total of 1,335,244,000 Italian lire on its initial theatrical run. The film was later released in France in 1969 with a runtime of 100 minutes.

The Day of the Owl was released on DVD as Mafia in the United States by Wild East as part of a double feature with I Am the Law.

== Reception ==
In Italy, producers Luigi Carpentieri and Ermanno Donati won the Nastro d'Argento award for Best Producer for the film. In a contemporary review, "Werb." of Variety referred to the film as "a skillfully-made, well-acted picture-blending social satire dramatic intensity and comic localisms, that should draw and hold audiences in all markets." "Werb." went on to state that three factors enhanced the film: the original novel by Leonardo Sciascia, the adaptation by Ugo Pirro and "Lee J. Cobb's outstanding performance, unsuspected thesping by Claudia Cardinale and a credible attempt from Franco Nero in a part calling for a more mature actor."
