= Renato Candida =

Italian law enforcement officer (1916–1988)

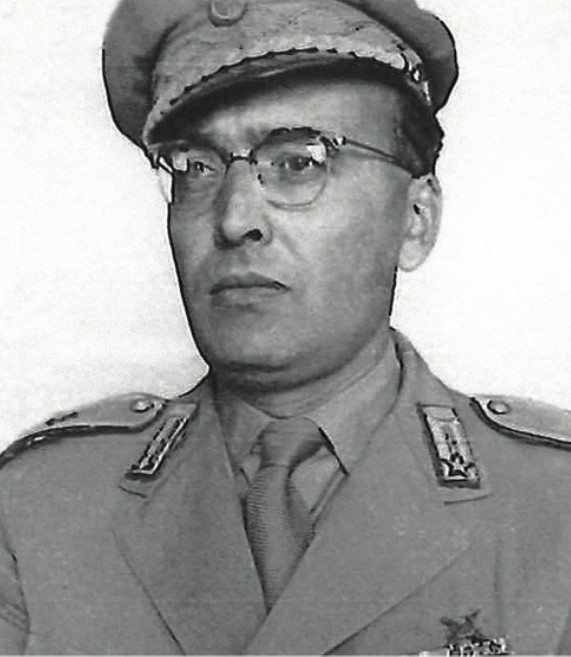
- Born: 30 September 1916; Lecce, Italy
- Died: 11 October 1988 (aged 72); Turin, Italy
- Occupations: Carabiniere; writer

Renato Candida (30 September 1916 – 11 October 1988) was an Italian carabiniere. While stationed in Agrigento in Sicily, he wrote Questa mafia ("This Mafia") in 1956. This book was among the first to acknowledge the existence of the Mafia as a criminal organization—a fact often denied by authorities at the time. He served as the inspiration for the character Captain Bellodi, the protagonist of Leonardo Sciascia's best-selling crime novel The Day of the Owl (Il giorno della civetta).

== Biography ==
Renato Candida was born in Lecce on 30 September 1916, to Luigi and Elvira Storace. An officer in the 52nd Infantry Regiment "Alpi" of Spoleto, he transferred to the Royal Carabinieri Corps in 1939, and with the rank of second lieutenant, he was sent to Calabria. During World War II, he served in Montenegro and was promoted to captain for war merit.

After the armistice between Italy and the Allies on 8 September 1943 and the ensuing German occupation of Italy, Candida refused to collaborate with the German forces. This refusal resulted in forced transfers, imprisonment, internment, and a series of daring escapes. His journeys took him from Montenegro to Trieste, Milan, and eventually Switzerland. He later escaped internment in Switzerland and found refuge in Ossola. Here, in February 1945, he began his involvement in the Resistance as a partisan in the Strona Brigade of the Ossola Command until May 1945.

After the war, he rejoined the Carabinieri and was posted to Genoa, Alessandria, and Biella. By 1953, he was stationed in Turin. On 10 September 1955, with the rank of major, Candida was assigned to command the Carabinieri group in Agrigento in Sicily. In the summer of 1956, he authored the book Questa mafia ("This Mafia"). It was one of the first works to acknowledge the real presence of the Mafia organization in the Agrigento region, at a time when authorities often denied the existence of the Mafia as a criminal association.

Candida and Leonardo Sciascia met in the summer of that same year. Sciascia himself arranged for Candida's manuscript to be published by his publisher Salvatore Sciascia in Caltanissetta. They became friends and met regularly; Sciascia said he was particularly struck by the official's outspoken anti-fascism. Sciascia published a positive review of the book in the magazine Tempo Presente. The book was considered groundbreaking because it broke the silence on the mafia phenomenon. A second edition was published in 1960, and a third in 1964. In 1983, a fourth edition was published with a preface by Leonardo Sciascia. In 2016, a fifth edition was published.

According to Sciascia, Candida served as the inspiration for the character of Captain Bellodi, the protagonist of the best-selling crime novel The Day of the Owl (Il giorno della civetta). Many believed that Bellodi was modeled after Carabinieri general Carlo Alberto dalla Chiesa, especially following his assassination by the Mafia in Palermo on 3 September 1982. Dalla Chiesa himself had identified as Captain Bellodi. However, Sciascia clarified that this was a misconception, revealing that Candida was the true inspiration. Sciascia's novel was adapted into the film of the same name in 1968 by Damiano Damiani, starring Franco Nero as Captain Bellodi.

Candida did not recognise himself in Captain Bellodi. He remarked: "That captain is too idealised; his relationship with the mafia boss may seem ambiguous. The boss is a real character, and the marshal who works alongside Bellodi is also credible. Bellodi is less so." Sciascia agreed with the assessment, describing Bellodi as "a bearer of values and not a real person". Bellodi, like Candida when he arrived in Agrigento, was "an outsider, a northerner resident in Sicily, who is not fully aware of local mores", and "too evidently an incarnation of values to carry narrative plausibility."

On 6 April 1957, Major Candida was promoted to lieutenant colonel, and left Sicily for the Carabinieri Training School in Turin, where he remained for the rest of his career. He was placed at disposal in 1965. Upon his retirement, he was appointed brigadier general. Regarding Candida's departure from Agrigento, Sciascia wrote: "After the book was published, Candida was duly transferred to the Carabinieri training school in Turin. It should be noted that at that time, Carabinieri officers and police commissioners who showed intelligence and willingness to fight the Mafia were promptly removed from Sicily...".

Candida died in Turin on 11 October 1988 at the age of 72. Exactly one month later, Sciascia commemorated him in an article published in La Stampa on 11 November 1988.

== Works ==
- Candida, Renato (1956). Questa mafia (in Italian) (2016; 5th ed.). Caltanissetta: Salvatore Sciascia editore. ISBN 978-88-8241-470-2.
- Candida, Renato (2000). Mafia insoluta: diario di un maggiore dei carabinieri (in Italian). Agrigento: Centro culturale editoriale Pier Paolo Pasolini. ISBN 88-85418-03-1.

== Sources ==
- Curti, Roberto (2013). Italian Crime Filmography, 1968-1980. Jefferson, NC/London: McFarland. ISBN 978-0786469765.
- Farrell, Joseph (1996). Leonardo Sciascia (Writers of Italy). Edinburgh: Edinburgh University Press. ISBN 0-7486-0620-3.
- Sciascia, Leonardo (2000) [1989]. A futura memoria: se la memoria ha un futuro (in Italian) (3. ed.). Milano: Bompiani. ISBN 88-452-4532-2.
