= Crotone Prize =

The Crotone Prize (Italian: Premio Crotone, IPA: [pre.mjo.kroˈtoːne]) was a prominent Italian literary award founded on April 4, 1952 in Crotone, Calabria, through the initiative of then-mayor Silvio Messinetti.

== History ==
The first official award ceremony took place in November 1956, and the prize continued until 1963. In its brief but influential existence, the Crotone Prize became a landmark event in Italian cultural life, recognizing and celebrating key figures in the nation's literature.

Notable winners included Leonida Repaci, Leonardo Sciascia, and Pier Paolo Pasolini though Pasolini's award in 1959 was controversially revoked by Francesco De Lorenzo, the prefect of Catanzaro at the time.

The jury was composed of some of Italy's most distinguished literary figures, such as Giuseppe Ungaretti, Carlo Emilio Gadda, Arnoldo Mondadori, Valentino Bompiani, and Alberto Moravia, among others. Their involvement helped elevate the prize's prestige, establishing Crotone as an important cultural hub in Southern Italy.

Despite its early success, the Crotone Prize held its final ceremony on April 6, 1963 due to financial and logistical challenges. Nonetheless, its legacy endures in Italian literary history, having spotlighted works and authors that left an indelible mark on the cultural fabric of the country.

== Winners ==
Edition	Year	Winners	Authors
I	1956	Un riccone torna alla terra	Leonida Repaci
II	1957	The Sky Is Red; The Southern Question	Giuseppe Berto; Gaetano Salvemini
III	1958	I fatti di Casignana	Mario La Cava
IV	1959	Violent Life; Magic: A Theory from the South; The Eclipse of the Intellectual	Pier Paolo Pasolini; Ernesto de Martino; Elémire Zolla
V	1960	Speranzella	Carlo Bernari
VI	1961	An Absurd Vice: A Biography of Cesare Pavese	Davide Lajolo
VII	1962	The Day of the Owl	Leonardo Sciascia
VIII	1963	Tibi e Tascia; The Hour of All	Saverio Strati; Maria Corti

== Bibliography ==
- Rocco Turi (1993). Riscriviamo la storia del premio Crotone (in Italian). Catanzaro: Grafiche Abramo.
- Gaetano Leonardi; Christian Palmieri (2013). Il «Premio Crotone» (1952–1963). Impegno culturale e nuovo meridionalismo (in Italian). Crotone: Città del Sole. ISBN 978-88-735-1674-3.
- Gaetano Leonardi; Christian Palmieri (2022). Intellettuali e Mezzogiorno. Volti e immagini di un premio. Il Premio Crotone (1956–1963) (in Italian). Crotone: Città del Sole. ISBN 978-88-8238-333-6.
- Christian Palmieri (2024). Pasolini e la Calabria. Atti del Convegno di Acri, 24-25 marzo 2023 (in Italian). Cosenza: Luigi Pellegrini Editore. ISBN 979-12-2050-198-9.

== See also ==
- Crotone
- List of literary awards
