= Alfonso Bartoli =

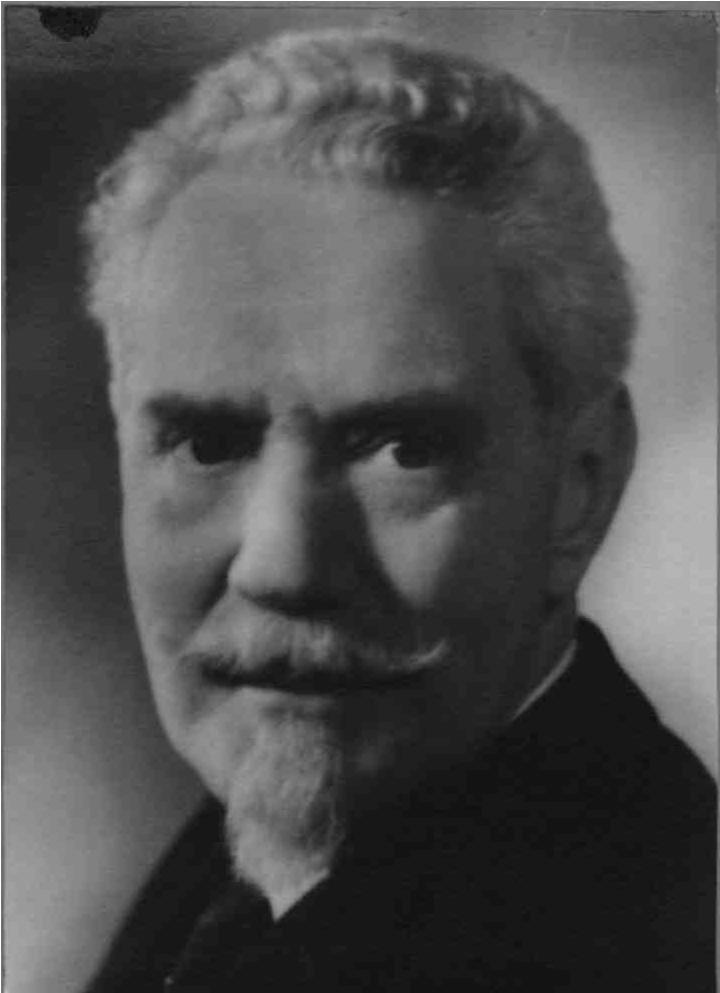
Alfonso Bartoli

Alfonso Bartoli (1 January 1874 - Rome, 26 January 1957) was an archaeologist, teacher, and Italian politician.

== Biography ==
He was the son of Cherubino Bartoli. He married Pia Carini, the last daughter of the Garibaldian Giacinto Carini from Palermo and sister of Isidoro, priest, paleographer, and first teacher of the Vatican School of diplomatic and archival paleography. Alfonso Bartoli's sister, Maria, married Alfonso Battelli: they are the parents of Giulio Battelli, paleographer and university professor. Graduated in literature and philosophy at the Sapienza University of Rome, where he studied with Rodolfo Lanciani among others, in 1904 he won a public competition and entered the Superintendency of Antiquities and Fine Arts of Rome. In 1911 he was appointed inspector of the excavations of the Roman Forum and Palatine Hill, at the time directed by Professor Giacomo Boni, renowned archaeologist who discovered the Lapis niger, the Regia, the Lacus Curtius, the archaic necropolis at the temple of Antoninus and Faustina and the church of Santa Maria Antiqua. He took over the management after Boni's death in 1925, and three times refused the promotion to superintendent in order not to detach himself from this monumental area. [3] It becomes necessary when, in 1928, a reorganization of the sector elevates the management for the Roman Forum and the Palatine to Superintendence.

In 1915, two years after the organization of an exhibition on the subject at Castel Sant'Angelo, he obtained a free lecturer in topography at la Sapienza, of which professor Rodolfo Lanciani, remaining active in teaching until 1929 as an aggregate, for another ten years as owner in place of Lanciani who died in the meantime.

Its activity was not only aimed at the excavations and recovery and restoration of monuments brought to light but also at a profound historical research, especially in the continuity between imperial and temporal power. Through the excavations of the palace of Augustus, for example, it has demonstrated the continuity of its use up to and beyond the transition from imperial property to papal possession in the eighth century. The excavations around the Curia Iulia have instead made it possible to discover and study a series of inscriptions that document how the end of the Roman Senate did not go back - as was then believed - to the 4th century but lasted until 1145. The restoration of the building, carried out through the deconsecration of the Sant'Adriano al Foro at the Roman Forum in which it had been transformed, was inaugurated by his decision with a meeting of the Senate of the Kingdom in the room restored to the original arrangement of the seats.

Completely disinterested in political activity, he accepted the fascist party card only in 1932 even if, he writes in his defensive memory, "I never made a distinction in my large staff of my office (about 150 people normally, now 80) between registered and non-registered; indeed, against the ban I also hired non-registered workers". After 8 September he refused to take an oath to the Italian Social Republic. He was appointed senator for life like his two predecessors in category 20 (Those who with eminent services or merits will have illustrated the homeland). and despite never having carried out activities in favor of the party or the war, it is declared forfeited with a sentence of the High Court of Justice for the Sanctions against Fascism of 30 October 1944, confirmed by the Cassation on 8 July 1948.

Like all urban planners and archaeologists active in the years of fascism, Bartoli also pays the price for the choices that have destroyed a considerable part of the historical and archaeological heritage of Rome. " Mussolini's Rome pours tears and blood ", writes Quinto Tosatti, first post-fascist president of the National Institute of Roman Studies and Christian Democratic senator, " having immediately understood man's weakness and megalomania, it was a competition in always proposing new forms of flattery; anyone who had to launch some big building deal, or to capture prebends and honors, had only to suggest the most bizarre imperial exhumations and reconstructions ". In commemorating his figure in the Senate, Giulio Andreotti inserts him "among the meritorious of restitution in value of what is most beautiful in the tradition of our city of Rome. He was truly a man of study, of uncommon artistic taste and one of those detached figures who deserve the merit of having done the most serious thing that has been done to make our capital truly worthy of its own traditions and mission".

== Works ==
- Domus Aurea "in the medieval topography of Rome - Report of the National Academy of the Lincei, class of moral sciences, history and philosophy, s. 5, XVIII (1909), pages 224-230
- Remains of medieval fortifications on the Palatine Hill - Report of the National Academy of the Lincei, class of moral sciences, history and philosophy, s. 5, XVIII (1909), p. 527-539
- For the conservation of some medieval memories included in the "Archaeological Walk - Report of the National Academy of the Lincei, class of moral sciences, history and philosophy, s. 5, XVIII (1909), pages 540-552;
- Recent events and Christian transformation of the Basilica Emilia - Report of the National Academy of the Lincei, class of moral sciences, history and philosophy, s. 5, XXI (1912), pp. 758–766
- The Palatine Chartularium - Account of the National Academy of the Lincei, class of moral sciences, history and philosophy, s. 5, XXI (1912), Pages 767-72
- The temple of Antoninus and Faustina - Monumenti Antichi Lincei, XXIII (19, 4), pp. 949–974
- The Horrea Agrippiana and the diaconia of s. Theodore - Ancient Lincei Monuments, XXIII (19, 4), Pages 374-402
- The southern enclosure of the Trajan Forum, in Memories of the Pontifical Roman Academy of Archeology, s. 3, 1, 2 (1924), Pages 177-191.
- The works of the Curia, Rome 1938
- The Roman Senate in honor of Ezio - Report of the Pontifical Roman Academy of Archeology, s. 3, XXII (1946–47), Pages 267-273
- The porphyretic statue of the Curia, in News of the excavations of antiquity, s. 8, 1 (1947), P. pp. 85–100
- The cult of Mater Deum Magna Idaea and of Venus Genetrix on the Palatine - Memoirs of the Pontifical Roman Academy of Archeology, s. 3-, VI, 2 (1947), pp. 229–239
- The last wreck of the imperial archive on the Palatine - Report of the Pontifical Roman Academy of Archeology, s. 3, XXIII-XXIV (1947–49), Pages 269-275
- The Acropolis of Ferentino, in Bulletin of Art, XXXIV (1949), Pages 293-306
- Ferentinum, Ferentinuni Novum, Ferentinum Maius - Report of the Pontifical Roman Academy of Archeology, s. 3, XXV-XXVI (1949-1951), Pages 153-156
- Works in the seat of the Roman Senate at the time of Theodoric - Bulletin of the Municipal Archaeological Commission of Rome, LXXIII (1949–50, published in 1952), Pag. 77 and following.
- The figured frieze of the Emilia Basilica - Art Bulletin, XXXV (1950), Pages 289-294
- Memories of Elagabalus in the seat of the Roman Senate - Report of the Pontifical Roman Academy of Archeology, s. 3, XXVII (1951–54), Pages 47–54
- Ferentino: epigraphic and topographic research - Report of the Pontifical Roman Academy of Archeology, s. 8, IX (1954), pp. 470–605
- Traces of oriental cults on the imperial Palatine - Report of the Pontifical Roman Academy of Archeology, s. 3, XXIX (1956–57), pp. 13–49.
