= District of Bivona =

Former district of Italy

Circondario di Bivona
- District of Bivona
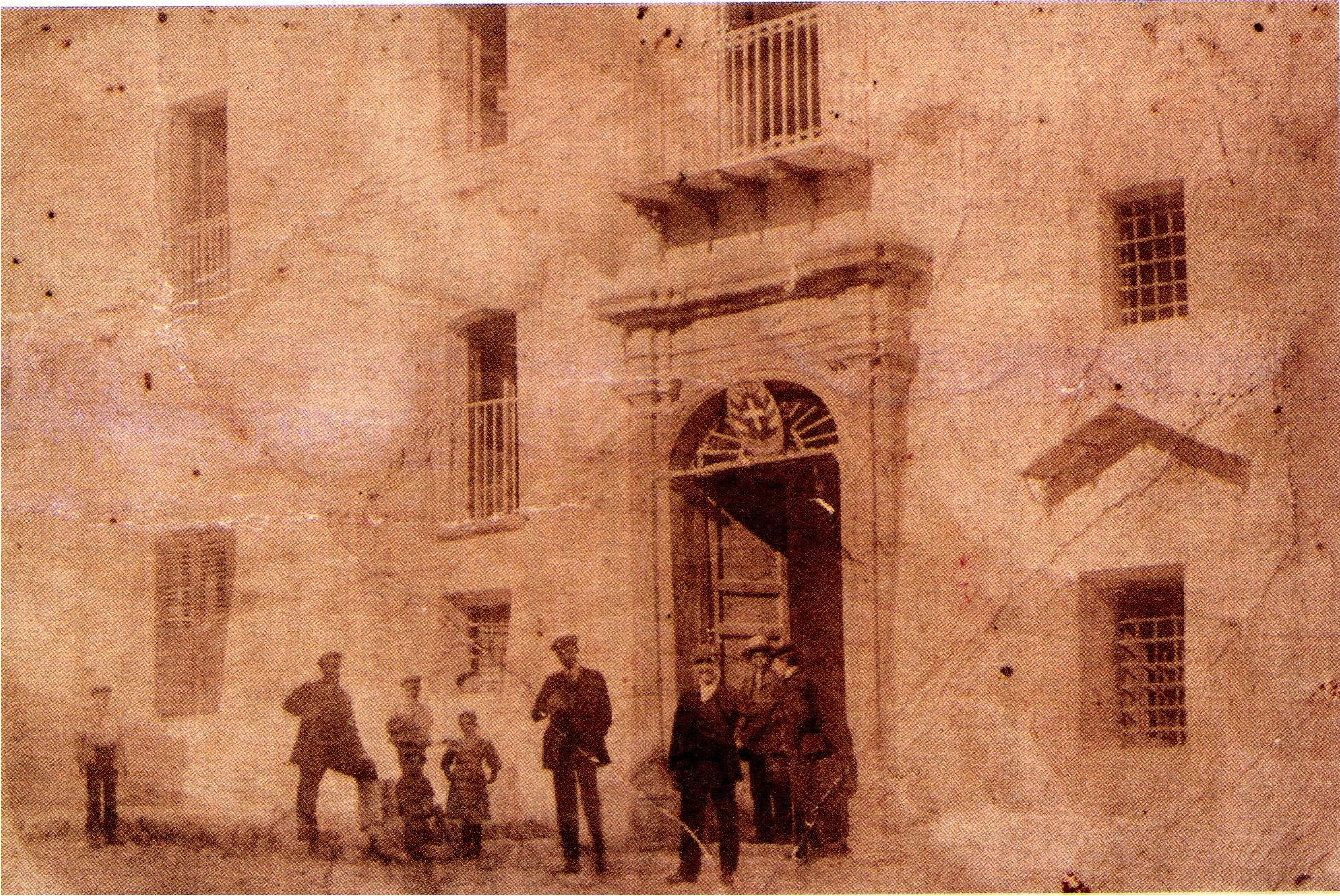
- The historic ducal palace of Bivona, the seat of the subprefecture
- Country: Italy
- Province: Province of Agrigento
- Capital: Bivona
- Date of establishment: 1860
- Date of suppression: 1927
- Coordinates of the capital city: 37°37′05″N 13°26′26″E
- Time zone: UTC+01:00
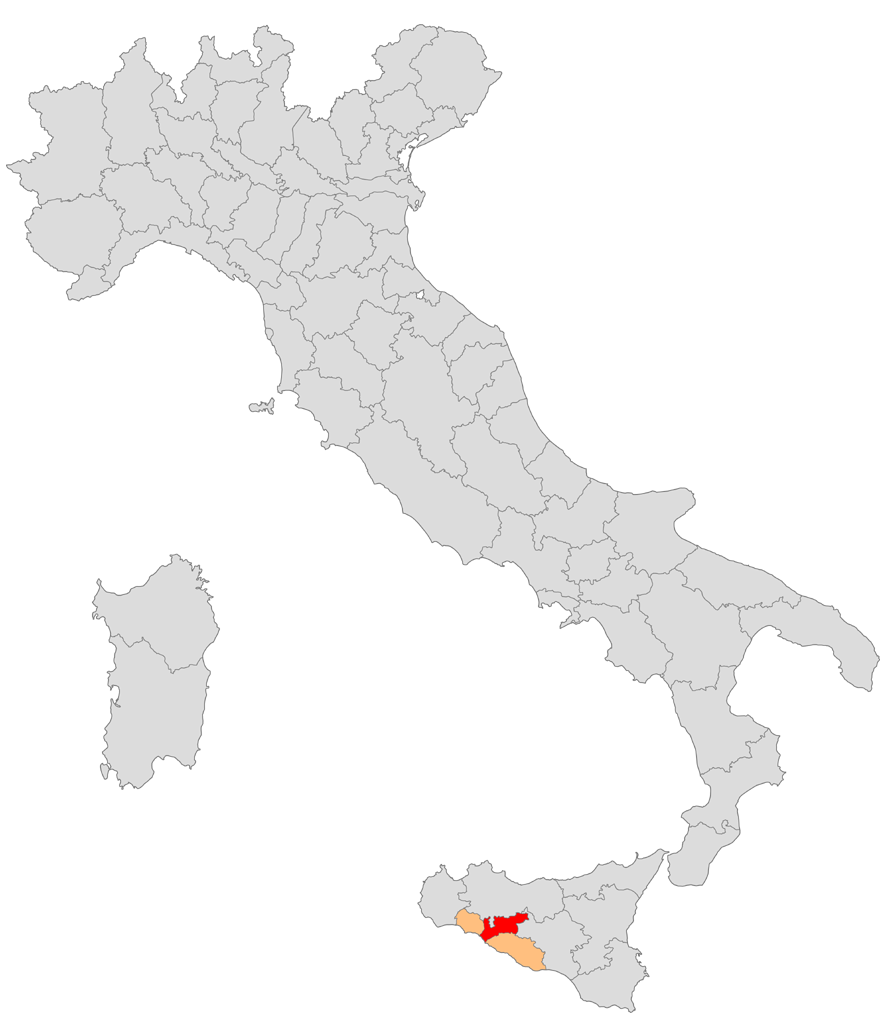

The district of Bivona (Italian: Circondario di Bivona) was one of the three districts into which the Italian province of Girgenti in Sicily was divided. Existing from 1860 to 1927, it comprised thirteen municipalities, grouped into five mandamenti, and traced the territory of the eponymous and previous Bourbon district established in 1812 in the Kingdom of Sicily, when feudalism was abolished in Sicily as a result of the new Constitution. It experienced a phase of decline in the 1860s, the years of the post-unification period, followed by a partial regrowth in the following decade; it was abolished in 1927, when the provincial capital was renamed Agrigento.

The capital of the district was the municipality of Bivona, already at the head of the district under the Sicilian Constitution of 1812, which valued its ancient origins, its favorable geographical position within the district, the titles it received (Bivona was the first ducal city of Sicily) and its scholastic tradition due to the presence of an ancient Jesuit college.

== Territory ==
=== Municipalities and mandamenti ===
The district of Bivona comprised the territory of thirteen municipalities, divided into five mandamenti:

- Mandamento of Bivona: Bivona (the capital), Alessandria di Sicilia (since 1862 Alessandria della Rocca), Cianciana, Santo Stefano di Bivona
- Mandamento of Burgio: Burgio, Lucca, Villafranca
- Mandamento of Cammarata: Cammarata, San Giovanni di Cammarata
- Mandamento of Casteltermini: Castel Termine, San Biagio
- Mandamento of Ribera: Calamonaci, Ribera

=== Area and boundaries ===
The entire district of Bivona covered an area of about 864 km^{2}, equal to the sum of the thirteen municipal territories. The district was bordered to the north by the districts of Corleone and Termini Imerese (in the province of Palermo), to the east by the district of Caltanissetta (in the province of the same name), to the south by the district of Girgenti, and to the west by the district of Sciacca (together with the Bivona district in the province of Girgenti). The Bivona district was bounded by the Mediterranean Sea (Sicilian Channel) to the south, the Platani River to the east, the Verdura River to the west and the Sicani mountain range to the north.

=== Population ===
In the 19th century, the population of the Bivona district was around 50,000; according to the 1921 census (six years before the suppression), it had 81,462 inhabitants.

== History ==
=== Garibaldi in Sicily ===
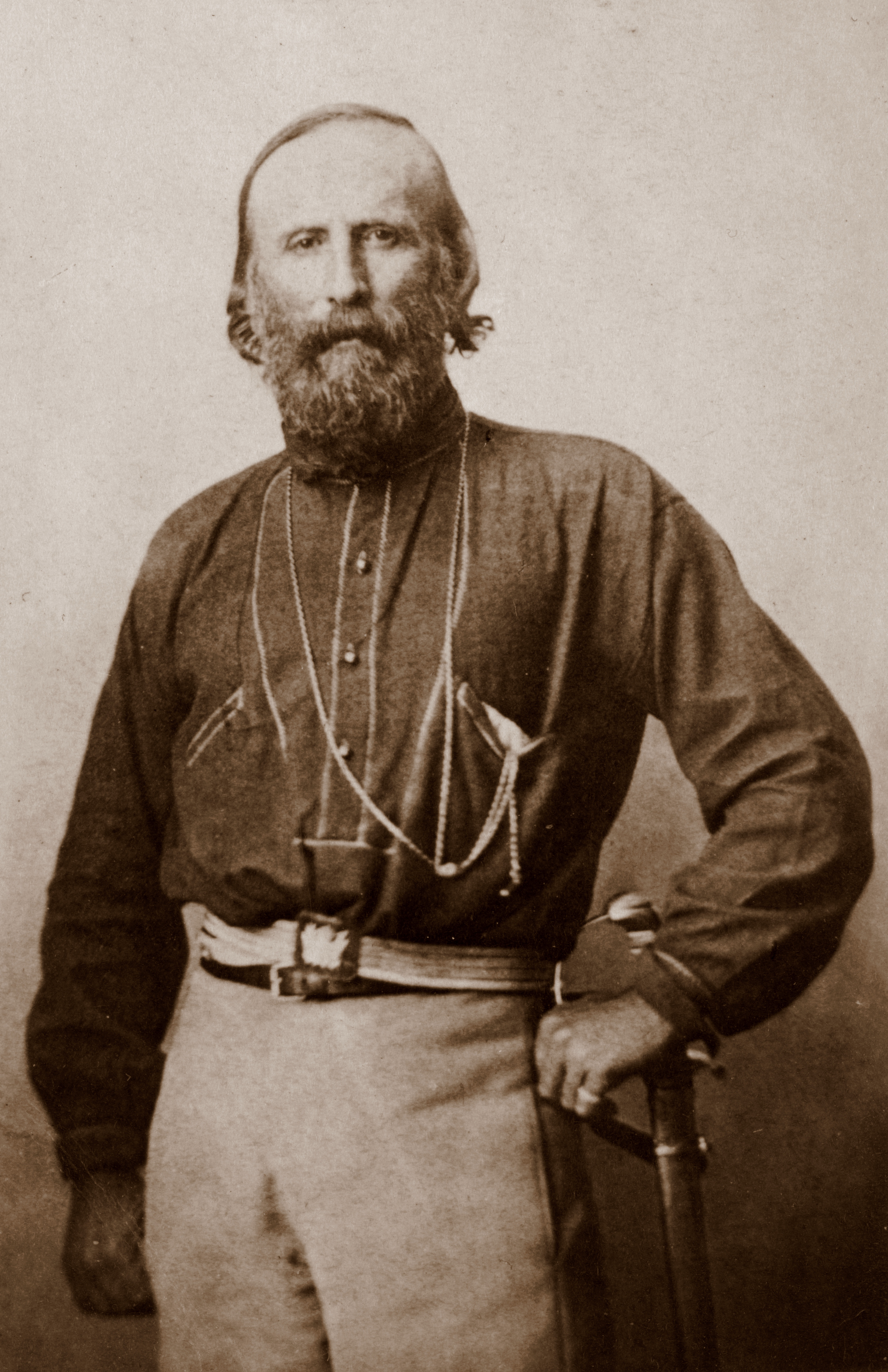
Giuseppe Garibaldi

In the first half of 1860, the district of Bivona was the scene of many public order disturbances (the most serious riots occurred in Santo Stefano di Bivona) and was involved in a heated and long-lasting debate caused by some municipalities that wanted to change the administrative structure of territorial districts and wanted to suppress the Bivona district.

The law and order crisis arose right around the time Giuseppe Garibaldi landed in Sicily to liberate the island from Bourbon rule. For about a month, from May 15 to June 10, the district of Bivona remained in the hands of the numerous armed bands, created due to the "state of almost complete dissolution of all social order" in the Bivona district, which carried out robberies and vendettas, not without bloodshed.

The following is a testimony by Onofrio Guggino, Commander of the Militia of the Bivona district, submitted to the Councilor of Public Safety on March 1, 1861:

The district was in a state of complete anarchy, harassed [...] by the false squads of Don Francesco Riggio of Cianciana and the brothers Captain Padella of S. Stefano and by a hamlet of malefactors said to depend on a squad of Santo Meli. Lucca and Ribera assailed by Riggio's false squad, Alessandria and Cammarata threatened by the Padella's false squad, Prizzi subjected to bounty, and S. Biagio stripped in broad daylight, made the municipalities of the district remain isolated from each other to the extent that one feared going from municipality to municipality and communications were disrupted.

On June 7, 1860, to restore balance to public order, Baron Giuseppe Guggino (president of the Provisional Committee of Bivona and coordinator of the other municipalities in the district) sent a letter to Garibaldi in which he urged the settlement in Bivona of the district's new governor, Francesco Falsone di Palma di Montechiaro, who partially resolved some problems affecting the district. On August 26, 1860, the decree for the administrative reorganization of Sicily was passed, to make the island's legislation similar to that of the Kingdom of Savoy: with the exclusion of the provinces, the old territorial districts changed their names, while keeping their geographical boundaries unchanged. Bourbon districts (the further subdivisions of the districts) became mandamenti.

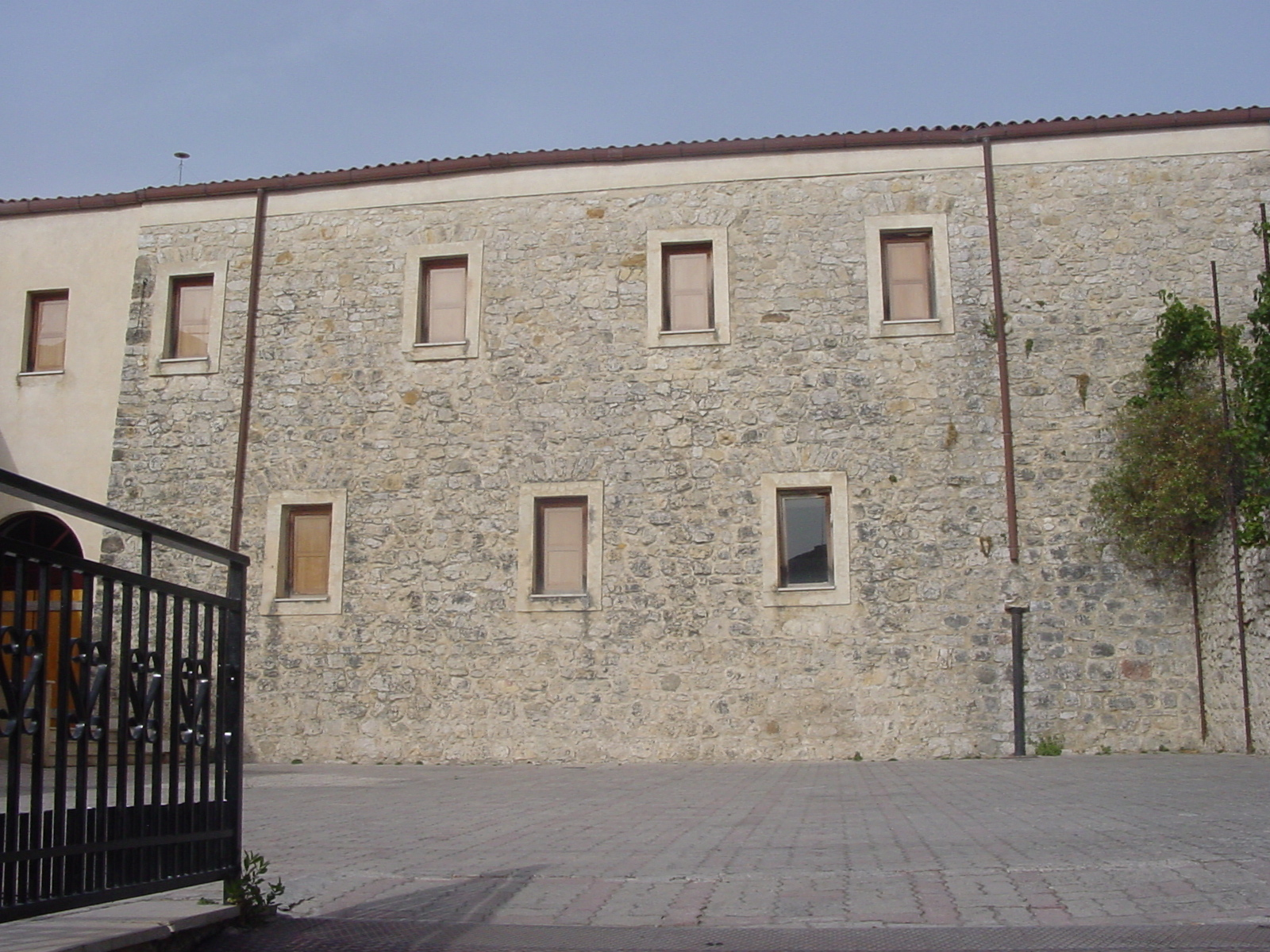
The convent of St. Dominic of Bivona, site of the polling station on October 21–22, 1860

=== The problems of the Bivona district ===
The plebiscite for the annexation of Sicily to the Kingdom of Italy under the sovereignty of Victor Emmanuel II of Savoy, held on October 21 and 22, 1860, turned out to be largely in favor of national unity in the Bivona district as well; nevertheless, it was precisely in the Bivona district that the highest percentage of votes against it was counted: out of 667 contrary votes cast throughout the Island, 34.5% (equal to 230 votes) were cast only in the territorial constituency of Bivona.

The process of the political and administrative homologation of Sicily to the legislation of the Kingdom of Italy started between the end of 1860 and the beginning of 1861: in early January municipal and provincial elections were held, in February political ones; in the constituency of Bivona was voted General Giacinto Carini. During the same period, new officials and employees of the district offices (direct tax agency, registry office, school inspectorate, district sanitary commission, commission of verification of weights and measures) and of the districts (magistrates' courts) were installed in Bivona.

The precursor of Palermo

[...] In fact, never in this district has an employee been changed for dereliction of duty, not only when bored with this residence, some elected person has come to have such protection that after many years and much ink and paper he has been moved to a better residence, always tolerating the sad and inept ones to stay there, as long as they do not ask for a transfer of environment. Such was also the way of the former Bourbon, and this district was the Cayenne of disgraced officials. We hoped for anything but to proceed from the restorative government, however unhappily we must confess that if then the disgraced employees came to us, the hope of rehabilitation made them better. Today, they send us the most ferocious or, at least, inept, they indulge at the expense of us miserable taxpayers, who have the misfortune of having seen the light in the Bivona district [...]

The start of the new administrative system showed considerable difficulties especially in the Bivona district, the only one in the province of Girgenti to be separated "by lack of roads and telegraph from any center of government." The new system was not easy to implement. Alessandro Della Rovere, lieutenant of the king, noting the marginalization of the area, considered the Bivona district as a suitable place to send there "for punishment any intendant who deserves a severe measure from the government." An article in the Palermo newspaper Il Precursore, published in 1872, called the Bivona district "the Cayenne of disgraced officials." Other problems were those related to connections and communications between the municipalities in the district: work on the completion of the Corleonese-Agrigentina rolling road was suspended; the construction of roads connecting the various district municipalities had not even begun.

As early as October 12, 1860, the civic council of Casteltermini had proposed its own town as the capital of the entire district: the prodictatorial government, favorable to the proposal, interpellated the provincial council. The latter, in the spring of 1861, proposed the suppression of the Bivona district, a redefinition of the administrative boundaries of the entire province of Girgenti and the establishment of a new district, that of Canicattì. This proposal created a heated debate between Bivona, Casteltermini, the prodictatorial government and the provincial council: the latter, in its session of October 27, 1863, deliberated the reconfirmation of the existing districts and of Bivona as capital. Considerable influence on the final decision turned out to be the accurate Defense of Bivona as District Capital written by notary Gaetano Picone, born in Bivona but residing in Santo Stefano.

The lack of consideration of the Bivona district had also been manifested in 1861, when the process of defining judicial districts was begun. The provincial council hoped for the establishment of a district court, to be set up alongside that of Girgenti. The new tribunal could have included some of the mandamenti of the Bivona district, which, however, desired its own aggregation to the Girgenti tribunal (with the exception of the mandamenti of Burgio and Ribera, closer to Sciacca). The lieutenancy decree of February 9, 1862 assigned the entire district of Bivona to the judicial district of Sciacca: once again the complaints of the district (especially of the mandamenti of Bivona, Cammarata and Casteltermini) remained unheeded.

=== The subprefecture of Bivona ===
In 1862 the subprefecture of Bivona was established, replacing the former subprefecture under Bourbon legislation. At its head was the subprefect, the highest authority in the district. The early post-unification years in Sicily were characterized by uncertainty and disappointment for everyone, especially the poorer classes: these were the years of banditry, the development of the Mafia, and the southern question. Such a climate was also felt in the district of Bivona, the only territorial district in the province of Girgenti uncertain of its own survival.

Within the district a series of contributing factors (the immense difficulties in restoring public order; the large number of draft dodgers and deserters who fled to the countryside - particularly to Burgio - to avoid military conscription; the clergy's firm opposition to the laws confiscating property and suppressing religious congregations; hostility toward the "Piedmontese" who had come to Sicily to fill important administrative and political roles) escalated into very strong opposition to the government and the establishment of a pro-Bourbon committee (in Bivona), which was also joined by employees of the local subprefecture.

Beginning in the spring of 1870, a critical period began for the Bivona subprefecture, due to the continuous turnover of its incumbent and the failure to fill its staff (in the same year the employees went from seven to five; in 1874 they became only three). The staffing of the sub-prefecture became full again only a few years later: however, during the 1970s, there was no shortage of experienced officials who, despite considerable difficulties, managed to achieve excellent results in line with the "process of social, political, cultural and moral promotion" adopted and promoted by the new government.

=== The development of the district ===
The 1870s turned out to be crucial for the Bivona district, hitherto subject to the incompetence and neglect of its administrators. The subprefects of this period emphasized the importance of public education, improvement of road conditions and agriculture with a view to a prompt redemption of the district; they also urged the citizens to a more active political life. During these years, despite the difficulties and problems related to the spread of banditry, the government worked effectively in the Bivona district, solving problems related to the inadequacy of the social and administrative structures of the municipalities in the district. In the span of ten years, all the municipalities in the Bivona district were endowed with urban police, rural police, mortuary police, hygiene and building regulations; the figure of the midwife was incorporated into the workforce; medical practice was established; and work on public lighting, the construction of cemeteries and inter-municipal roads was initiated and partially concluded.

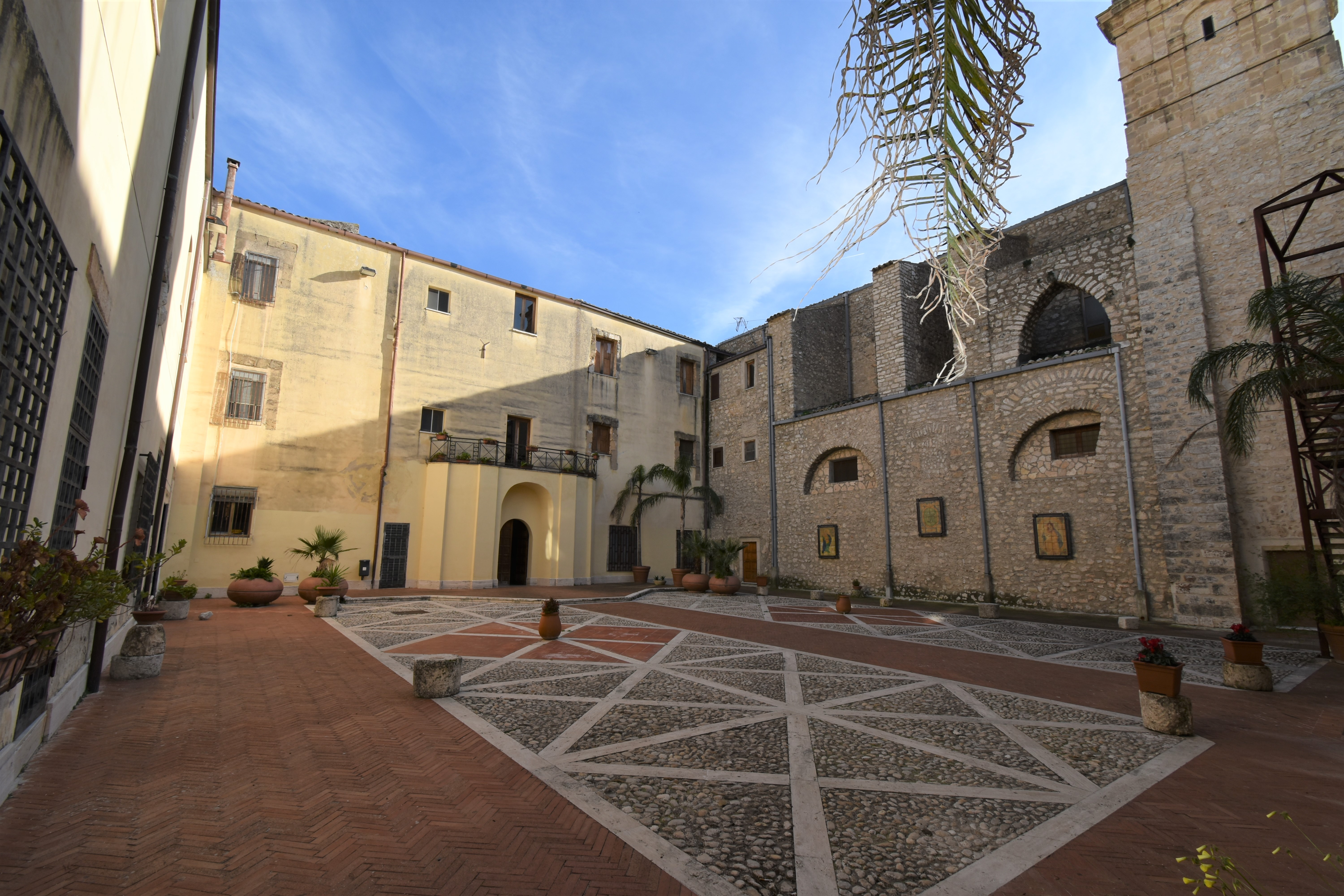
The atrium of the Bivona Jesuit college, whose ground floor rooms in the 19th century were home to public primary and secondary schools

As for primary education, which was totally managed by the municipalities, the government ensured the quality of its corpus docentium, intervening, moreover, to ensure the decorum of the school premises. The number of schoolchildren, partly due to the compulsory attendance enforced by the government, rose from 1,222 in 1870 to 2,558 in 1874: this number was destined to increase in 1877, the year of the enactment of the Coppino Law, which provided for compulsory schooling up to the third year of the elementary course. The Bivona district also experienced a period of development in terms of infrastructure: in 1875 the Corleonese-Agrigentina rolling road connected the Bivona district (Santo Stefano di Bivona, Bivona, Alessandria della Rocca and Cianciana) with Palermo; in the early 1880s the works were completed, connecting all these localities with the provincial capital, Girgenti. In 1878 the Filaga-Lercara Friddi road was inaugurated, through which the towns in the Bivonese district were connected to the railroad network.

However, it was during this period that the rise of the Mafia took over, which was present in every town in the district and counted on the protection of prominent members of the local bourgeoisie and the bureaucratic apparatus (the so-called "mafia in yellow gloves"). The development of the mafia was fostered by the participation in it of well-known members of the economically and socially prominent social strata and by the fear and omertà of the population; in 1870, Bivona sub-prefect De Luca stated:

There is more belief in the power of malfeasance, the so-called Mafia, than that of the government; whereupon it follows that the aggrieved or robbed never push complaints to the judicial or public safety authority for fear of greater harm.

The armed gangs that continued to operate up to this period were also joined by escapees from the Bivona district prisons, many of whom operated in the area of San Biagio Platani, "committing robberies, kidnappings, rapes and other serious crimes." The crime problem in the Bivona district was only partially solved in the late 1970s, when armed gangs were broken up.

=== Workers' fasci ===
The last decade of the 19th century was marked by the organized movement of the Sicilian fasci, the first of which was established in Catania on May 1, 1892. By 1893 the organization developed and spread to cover every point on the island. A number of workers' fasci were established within the Bivona district as well: the first was that of Santo Stefano Quisquina, founded by Lorenzo Panepinto (May 1893); on September 17 of the same year the Bivona fascio was formed; a few days later the Cianciana fascio was formed; on October 7, 1893, the workers' fascio of Alessandria della Rocca was also formed; others were also formed in the remaining municipalities of the district. However, after a few months marked by an experience that was able to awaken the almost resigned spirits of the peasants and workers, on January 3, 1894, Francesco Crispi, a native of the Bivona district, requested and obtained from the Council of Ministers the authorization for the establishment of the state of siege, proclaimed by General Morra di Lavriano.

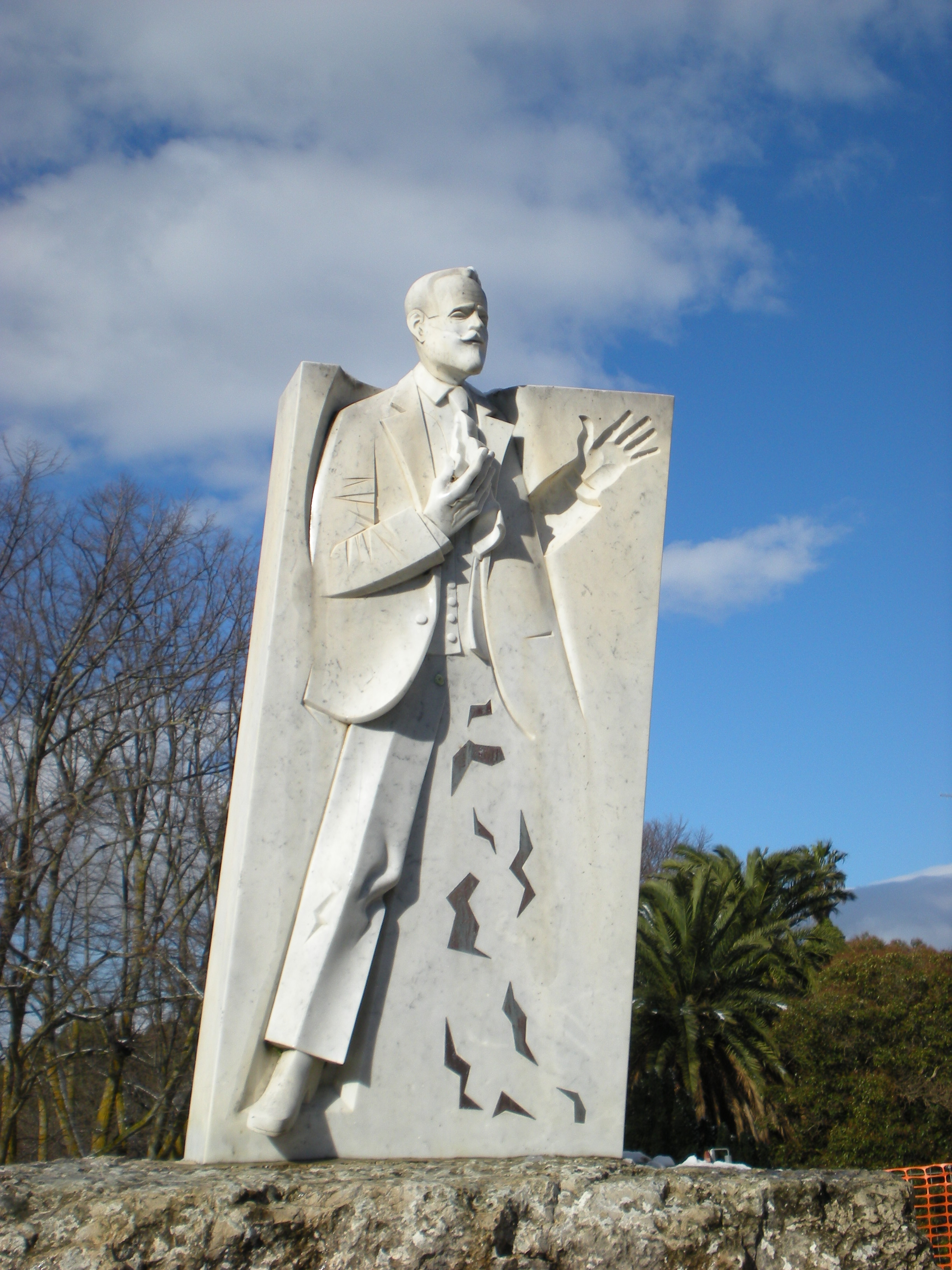
Statue of Lorenzo Panepinto in Santo Stefano Quisquina

=== The murder of Lorenzo Panepinto ===
On May 16, 1911 Lorenzo Panepinto was murdered in Santo Stefano Quisquina, right in front of the entrance to his house, with two rifle shots to the chest. The figure of Lorenzo Panepinto was paradigmatic not only for Santo Stefano Quisquina, but also for Bivona, Alessandria della Rocca, Cianciana, and all the other municipalities in the surrounding area; this was pointed out in 1987 by historian and politician Francesco Renda:

[...] Shortly thereafter, in fact, Lorenzo Panepinto was to be slaughtered in his Santo Stefano at the hands of infamous assassins. Comrade Alfonso Amato had had the opportunity to meet and approach him during his visits to Cianciana. In fact, ties between S. Stefano, Cianciana, Lucca Sicula, Bivona, Raffadali, etc., were very frequent and Lorenzo Panepinto was the leader recognized and loved by all.

Panepinto's murder shook even more the entire surrounding area, which had already been a victim of the Mafia for some time: among the members of the underworld, political figures also stood out, including Baron Domenico De Michele Ferrantelli, mayor of Burgio and deputy of the Bivona constituency, who in 1909 procured an alibi for Vito Cascio Ferro, believed to be the main culprit in the murder of Italian-American policeman Joe Petrosino. De Michele testified that Cascio Ferro would be with him on the very evening of the murder at his rustic villa in Bivona; the Bisacquino boss, who was arrested on April 3, 1909, was released from prison the same evening, immediately after the baron's testimony.

=== The suppression of the districts ===
With Royal Decree-Law No. 1/1927 of January 2, 1927 (Reorganization of provincial districts), backed by Benito Mussolini with the collaboration of King Victor Emanuel III and Alfredo Rocco, all the sub-prefectures of the Kingdom of Italy were abolished: Bivona ceased to be the capital and, along with the other twelve municipalities that formed the administrative district, continued to be part of the same province, renamed as the province of Agrigento from that year.

== The coat of arms of the province of Girgenti ==
Stemma della Provincia di Agrigento

The coat of arms of the province of Girgenti was made during the 1920s: it depicts the emblems of the cities of Girgenti, Sciacca and Bivona, that is, the provincial seats of the prefecture and the two subprefectures.

The left section (coat of arms of Girgenti) depicts three naked women with their feet on a plain, intent on supporting a structure with three medieval towers topped by a consecrated host. The upper right section (coat of arms of Sciacca) depicts a knight in armor on horseback assaulting a medieval fortress; in the ovoid body section, endowed with eight short lateral protrusions and a crescent moon. In fact, the Bivonese emblem was misrepresented: it depicted a pine cone (now replaced by the figure of a crab). The coat of arms of the province of Girgenti (later to become "of Agrigento") was approved by the National Heraldic Council and legalized by royal decree on April 15, 1938, assuming the appearance it still retains to this day.

== Administration ==
The first authority in the district of Bivona was the intendant, who performed the duties assigned to him by the laws, carried out the orders of the governor of the province and provided in cases of urgency, always reporting to the governor. The governor and intendants (from 1862 called prefect and subprefects) had a secretarial office.

=== Bivonese offices in the district ===
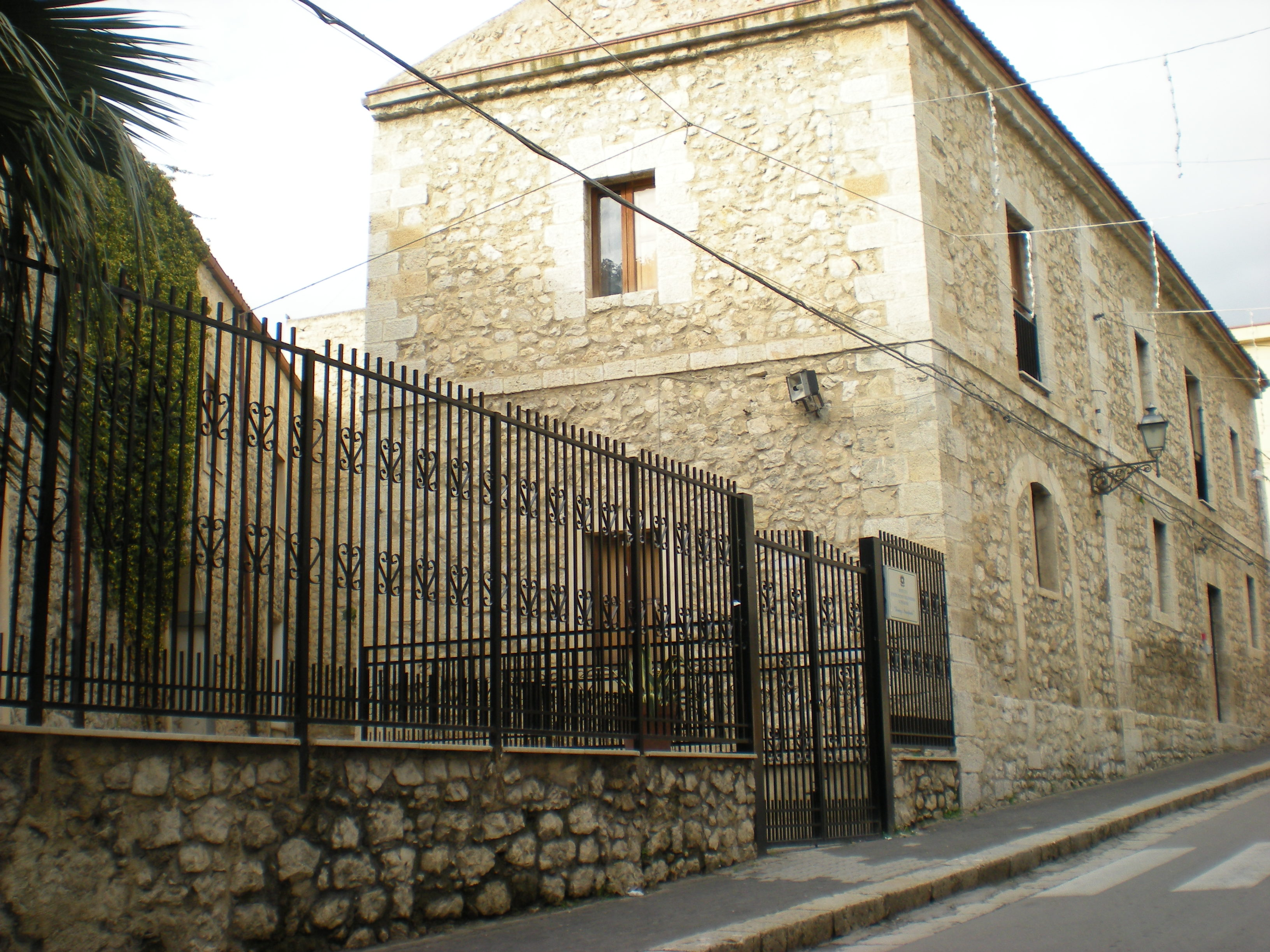
The premises of the gendarmerie in Bivona.

Offices	Period	Headquarters
Subprefecture	1859 1850-1860 1863-1882 1863-1882	Premises of the Convent of St. Dominic "Pinelli" neighborhood houses De Michele Palace (subprefect's quarters) Ducal Palace (subprefecture offices)
Royal Carabinieri	1870	Former Convent of St. Dominic
Military detachment	ante 1878	Former Jesuit College (Military Quarter)
Prison	1818-1882	Ducal Palace
Prison guard corps	1865-1866	Private premises

=== Electoral College ===
With the unification of Italy, the entire Italian territory was divided into constituencies; that of Bivona (the 199th), however, did not coincide with the district. It was formed by:

- eight municipalities in the district (Bivona, Alessandria, Burgio, Cammarata, Casteltermini, San Giovanni, Santo Stefano and Villafranca);
- the municipality of Caltabellotta (Sciacca district);
- the municipality of Castronovo (Termini Imerese district).

The remaining five municipalities were part of the Aragona constituency (Cianciana and San Biagio) and the Sciacca constituency (Calamonaci, Lucca and Ribera).

Among the deputies to the national parliament who represented the Bivona constituency were Giacinto Carini, Prince of Belmonte Gaetano Monroy and Nicolò Gallo, former provincial councilor of the Bivona mandamento (1878–1882) and future minister of Public Education and Grace and Justice.

== Publications ==
A number of works have been published that directly or implicitly discuss the Bivona district, especially its relationship with Piedmontese government officials or the development of the Mafia within it:

- in 1956 Renato Candida published Questa Mafia, devoting an entire chapter to the mafia phenomenon present in the Bivona district (La mafia del circondario di Bivona);
- in 2005 was reprinted Le tribolazioni di un insegnante di Ginnasio, published in 1872 by the philologist Placido Cerri, in which the author, a student of the historian Alessandro D'Ancona, recounted his own experience in the Bivona district: despite having won a scholarship to further his studies abroad, he gave up his research because he was forced to move from Turin to Bivona, where he had been appointed director of the local gymnasium. The unfavorable economic, social and cultural situation of the Sicilian town led the author to denounce its aspects in La Nazione of Florence, assisted by D'Ancona;
- in 2008 Pasquale Marchese published Gaetano Marini verificatore di pesi e misure. Bivona 1862, a book in which the protagonist, sent by the Piedmontese government to the Agrigento area to introduce his own units of measurement, narrates his unfortunate experience and the failure of his mission.

== See also ==
- Bivona
- Southern Italy
- Kingdom of the Two Sicilies
- Unification of Italy
- Coat of arms of Bivona
- History of Bivona

== Bibliography ==
- Candida, Renato (1956). Questa Mafia. Caltanissetta-Roma: Salvatore Sciascia Editore.
- Cerri, Placido; D'Ancona, Alessandro (1988). Armando Costa, Sarino (ed.). Le tribolazioni di un insegnante di Ginnasio. Palermo: Sellerio Editore.
- Lupo, Salvatore (2004). Storia della mafia: dalle origini ai giorni nostri. Donzelli Editore. ISBN 978-88-7989-903-1.
- Marchese, Pasquale (2008). Gaetano Marini verificatore di pesi e misure. Bivona 1862. Palermo: Sellerio Editore. ISBN 978-88-389-2245-9.
- Marrone, Antonino (1987). Bivona città feudale voll. I-II. Caltanissetta-Roma: Salvatore Sciascia Editore.
- Marrone, Antonino (2001). Bivona dal 1812 al 1881. Bivona: Comune di Bivona.
- Marrone, Antonino (1996). Il Distretto, il Circondario ed il Collegio Elettorale di Bivona (1812-1880). Bivona: Comune di Bivona.
- Renda, Francesco (1977). I fasci siciliani 1892-94. Torino: Einaudi. ISBN 978-88-06-48413-2.
- Renda, Francesco (1987). La Sicilia degli anni '50: studi e testimonianze. Guida Editori. ISBN 978-88-7042-738-7.
- Sedita, Giovan Battista (1993). Cenno storico-politico-etnografico di Bivona. Santo Stefano Quisquina: Tipografia Geraci.
