= Illustrious Corpses =

1976 Italian film

- Italian film poster
- Directed by: Francesco Rosi
- Screenplay by: Tonino Guerra; Lino Jannuzzi; Francesco Rosi
- Based on: Equal Danger by Leonardo Sciascia
- Produced by: Alberto Grimaldi
- Starring: Lino Ventura; Tino Carraro; Marcel Bozzuffi; Paolo Bonacelli; Alain Cuny; Luigi Pistilli; Renato Salvatori; Tina Aumont; Fernando Rey; Max von Sydow; Charles Vanel
- Cinematography: Pasqualino De Santis
- Edited by: Ruggero Mastroianni
- Music by: Piero Piccioni
- Production companies: Produzioni Europee Associati; Les Productions Artistes Associés
- Distributed by: United Artists Europa
- Release dates: 12 February 1976 (Italy); 26 May 1976 (France)
- Running time: 121 minutes
- Countries: Italy; France
- Language: Italian

Illustrious Corpses (Italian: Cadaveri eccellenti, French: Cadavres exquis) is a 1976 Italian-French thriller film directed by Francesco Rosi and starring Lino Ventura, based on the 1971 novel Equal Danger by Leonardo Sciascia.

In 2008, the film was included in the Italian Ministry of Cultural Heritage's 100 Italian films to be saved, a list of 100 films that "have changed the collective memory of the country between 1942 and 1978."

== Plot ==
The film starts with the murder of Investigating Judge Varga in Palermo, amongst a climate of demonstrations, strikes and political tension between the Left and the Christian Democratic government. The police assign Inspector Rogas to solve the case. While he is starting his investigation, two more judges are killed. All victims turn out to have worked together on several cases. After Rogas discovers evidence of corruption surrounding the three government officials, his superiors advise him "not to forage after gossip," but to trail the "crazy lunatic who for no reason whatever is going about murdering judges."

Rogas seeks out three men wrongfully convicted by the murdered judges, and finds his likely suspect in Cres, a pharmacist who was convicted of attempting to poison his wife. Rogas concludes that he was probably framed by his wife. During a search of his house Rogas learns that Cres has not only disappeared but that all pictures of him have his face cut out. Meanwhile, a fourth investigating judge is killed. Upon leaving the site of the murder, Rogas runs into his friend from schooldays, Cusan, who writes for a far-left newspaper. Although the two men have diverging political views, Cusan expresses his respect for the sincerity and strictness of Rogas' investigations.

After a fifth killing in front of the Justice Building, the two main eyewitnesses, a policeman and a prostitute, report having seen two young men run away from the scene and a car speeding off afterwards. Other than the policeman's recount, who states that the young men fled in the car, the prostitute insists that the men and the car left in different directions. Rogas is demoted and told to work with the political division to pin the crimes on the revolutionary Leftist terrorist groups.

Rogas seeks out the Supreme Court's president Riches in order to warn him that he is most likely the next victim. On his first visit, he spots several high-ranking government officials in their cars, including the car which the prostitute had described. Riches details to Rogas a philosophy of justice wherein the court is incapable of error by definition. At a party in the same building, held by shipping tycoon and prominent Christian Democracy member Pattos, Rogas discovers the Minister of Justice with many prominent representatives of the political Left, amongst them the editor of the revolutionary paper Cusan is working for, Galano. He and the Minister have a discussion where the latter reveals that sooner or later, his party will have to form a coalition with the Communist Party, and that it will be their task to prosecute the far-leftist groups. Rogas spots a man whom he believes to be his suspect Cres, but when he wants to approach him, the man has disappeared. After leaving, Rogas is being followed.

Rogas asks his friend, a police commissary and surveillance expert, to place a bug in the office of the Chief of Police. On one of the phone recordings, the Chief of Police advises his anonymous listener to "take it easy on the judges" for the time being because of Rogas' investigations. Rogas concludes that the first murders of the judges were carried out by Cres and that the subsequent murders were ordered to justify the prosecution of the far-left groups. He explains his theory to Cusan who, after initial doubts, proposes to Rogas to speak to Amar, the Secretary-General of the Communist Party. Without their knowledge, their conversation has been followed by Riches with a hidden microphone. After listening to the conversation, Riches is shot like the other judges.

Rogas discovers that his phone is tapped. He meets with Amar, the Secretary-General of the Communist Party, in a museum, where both of them are killed. Amongst rising tensions between revolutionaries and the government, which mobilizes the army, the Chief of Police reads a statement which blames the killing of Amar on the mentally unstable Rogas, who committed suicide after the murder. The film ends with a discussion between Cusan and the vice-secretary of the Communist Party. The latter declares that the party will accept the government's official version of the murders to prevent an open confrontation which could be carried out into the streets. "But then the people must never know the truth?", asks Cusan. The vice-secretary answers: "Truth is not always revolutionary."

== Cast ==
- Lino Ventura as Inspector Amerigo Rogas
- Tino Carraro as Chief of Police
- Marcel Bozzuffi as The lazy
- Paolo Bonacelli as Dr. Maxia
- Alain Cuny as Judge Rasto
- Maria Carta as Madame Cres
- Luigi Pistilli as Cusan
- Tina Aumont as The prostitute
- Renato Salvatori as Police Commissary
- Paolo Graziosi as Galano
- Anna Proclemer as Nocio's wife
- Fernando Rey as Security Minister
- Max von Sydow as Riches, Supreme Court president
- Charles Vanel as Varga

== Background ==
The film's title refers to the surrealist game Cadavre Exquis invented by André Breton, in which two or more participants contribute words or images to a collective piece of art without seeing the contributions made by the other party or parties. In the words of film critic Roberto Curti, the title describes "the meandering nature of the film with its unpredictable foray into the world of political manipulations, as well as the 'illustrous' corpses of the murdered judges".

== Release ==
Illustrious Corpses was released on 12 February 1976 in Italy and on 26 May the same year in France. It was screened out of competition at the 1976 Cannes Film Festival and at the New York Film Festival in October the same year.

== Reception ==
While Claudio Sorgi of La Rivista del Cinematografo called Illustrious Corpses an "important film", Vincent Canby of the New York Times titled it "disappointing", "predictable" and "trivial" despite all the talents involved.

The film triggered a lot of controversy at the time of its release for the film's last sentence, spoken by the communist party vice-secretary: "Truth is not always revolutionary".

== Awards ==
- David di Donatello Award for Best Film and Best Director Francesco Rosi
