= Friederike Funk =

German soprano

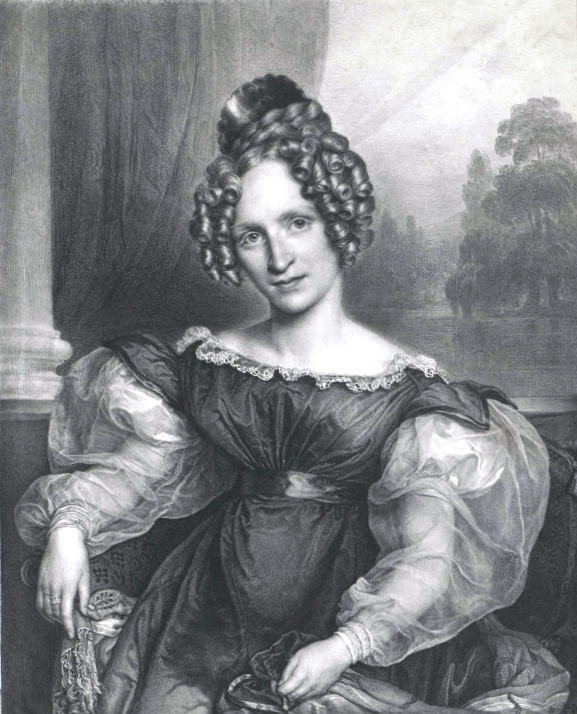
Friederike Funk

Friederike Funk, married name La Grua bzw. Funk La Grua (14 November 1796 - after 1863) was a German operatic soprano and Royal Saxon Kammersinger in Dresden.

== Life ==
Born in Meissen, the daughter of a postmaster from her hometown received her vocal training from Johann Aloys Miksch in Dresden from 1813. In May 1816, she received her first engagement at the Dresdner Hoftheater under the direction of Francesco Morlacchi. Afterwards, accompanied by her brother and at the behest of the Saxon king she spent two years in Italy to perfect her voice. She received this royal scholarship through the mediation of Morlacchi. In Italy she performed among others in Naples and St. Carlo and took lessons in Naples with Niccolò Antonio Zingarelli and Luigi Mosca. In the autumn of 1818, now engaged at the Italian and German Operas in Dresden, she sang the title role in Rossini's Elisabetta, regina d'Inghilterra, and in 1822 Agathe in Weber's Der Freischütz. In 1824, she sang Eglantine in Weber's Euryanthe. She performed among others with the singers Anna Maria Neumann-Sessi and Wilhelmine Schröder-Devrient In 1827, after guest performances in Darmstadt, she went to Italy again, where she received an engagement in Palermo. After her marriage in Palermo to the tenor Signor La Grua, she returned to Dresden in the 1830s, now under the name Friederike Funk La Grua, and worked as a singing teacher. Even after her marriage, she still performed sporadically Lastly, she lived with her daughter Emmy, also a singer among others in Paris, Dresden, Vienna and Turin, as well as a singing teacher, in Paris. Emmy La Grua received singing lessons from Pauline Garcia and Caroline Ungher-Sabatier.
