= Coat of arms of Bivona =

- Shield bearing two intertwined branches of oak and olive tree and crest, surmounted by a crown, depicting at the top a half waning moon and a crab at the bottom.

The Coat of arms of Bivona is the representational emblem of the Italian town of Bivona, in Agrigento, Sicily, situated in the Monti Sicani mountain range.

It represents the ancient state of nobility and wealth, social and cultural development of the country, that became a duchy in the 16th century, capital of the district, and a Comune, in the 19th century; and the seat of sottintendenza and sub-prefecture, reason that the emblem also act as the coat of arms of the province of Agrigento.

In ancient times the emblem was stamped on the crown walls: in 1554, the town was adorned with the title of city.

== Heraldic description ==
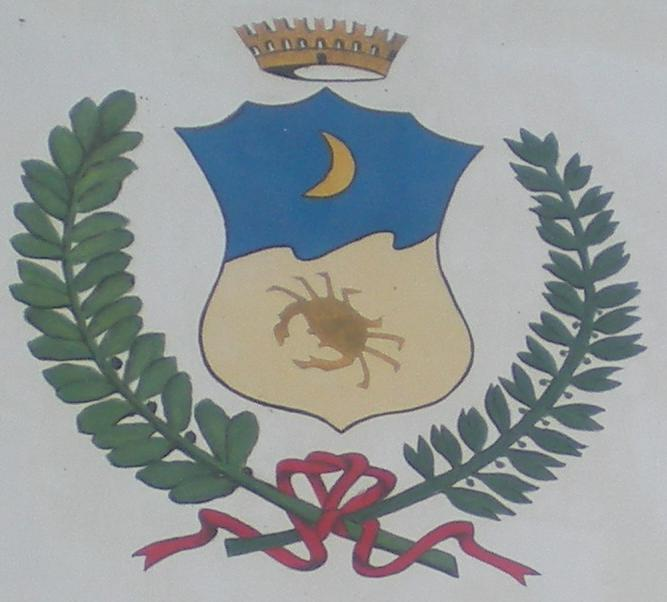
Coat of arms of Bivona

Banner of Bivona

The description of the coat of arms, included within the municipal charter of Bivona, is as follows:

Shield bearing two intertwined branches of oak and olive tree and crest, surmounted by a crown, depicting at the top a half waning moon and a crab at the bottom.

== History ==
=== The seal of the University of Bivona ===
Until 1785, a seal engraved with the municipal arms of the lord of that time was used on the official acts of the University of Bivona. On 5 March 1785, with the publication of the royal circular letters, it was willing that the barons of the kingdom do not interfere in the election of judges, and mayors of their respective lands: thus, there was no longer baronial issuing power, the city administration bivonese was endowed with a new seal. The latter bore the emblem of the House of Bourbon-Sicily at the top, and a few naturalistic elements (such as some plants) around a tower at the bottom.

Below are the descriptions of three municipal seals of Bivona of 1593, the 1638 and 1801.

==== Seal of 1593 ====
A seal of the University of Bivona in a document of 1593 (currently available at the State Archives of Palermo) probably depicts the arms of families D'Aragona, De Luna d'Aragona and Peralta, although there are doubts about the exact identification of the latter.

In 1593 a woman was the head of the duchy of Bivona, Aloisia de Luna, daughter of Peter de Luna (first Duke of Bivona) and Isabella de Vega, also the daughter of Juan de Vega, Viceroy of Sicily. Aloysia became the investiture of the duchy in September 1592, after the death of brother Giovanni, in 1567 she married Cesare Moncada, died in 1571; in 1577 she became the wife of Antonio Aragon, duke of Montalto.

==== Seal of 1638 ====
A seal of the University of Bivona present in a document dated May 17, 1638 (also available at the State Archives of Palermo) depicts the arms of the families of Luna, de La Cerda and Aragona-Sicilia; missing are the arms of the Moncada family.

In 1638, Luigi Guglielmo Moncada was the Duke of Bivona, great-grandson of Aloysia de Luna and descendant of the Aragon family.

== Usage today ==
The current coat of arms (since 2021) of the comune of Bivona is different.

Modern coat of arms of Bivona

In most sources, the communal arms depicts a shield topped with a crown bearing a crescent moon and golden pine cone (or thistle depending on source), with olive and oak branches complementing it.

The Free Municipal Consortium of Agrigento, which Bivona is part of, contains a combination of the arms of the three prefectures of Bivona alongside Agrigento and Sciacca. The third featuring Bivona though uses the old coat of arms but with a spider instead of a crab. There seems to be no information as to why this is the case (but most probably due to a printing error, similar to the Sardinia flag situation).

== See also ==
- History of Bivona
- Province of Agrigento

== Works cited ==
- Amato Amati, Dizionario Corografico dell'Italia (Italy Chorographic Dictionary) - Volume 1, Milan, Vallardi Publisher, 1877.
- Antonino Marrone, Bivona feudal town (Bivona città feudale) vols. I-II-Rome Caltanissetta, Salvatore Sciascia Publisher, 1987.
- Antonino Marrone, Il Distretto, il Circondario ed il Collegio Elettorale di Bivona (1812-1880) (The District of the Constituency and Surroundings of Bivona (1812–1880)), Bivona, Municipality of Bivona, 1996.
- Antonino Marrone, Storia delle Comunità Religiose e degli edifici sacri di Bivona (History of Religious Communities and religious buildings of Bivona), Bivona, Municipality of Bivona, 1997.
- Antonino Marrone, Bivona dal 1812 al 1881 (Bivona from 1812 to 1881), Bivona, Municipality of Bivona, 2001.
- Francesco Nicotra, Dizionario illustrato dei Comuni di Sicilia (Dictionary of the municipalities of Sicily), Palermo, 1907.
- Giovan Battista Sedita, Cenno storico-politico-etnografico di Bivona (Historical, political and ethnographic Bivona), Bivona, 1909
