= We Still Kill the Old Way (1967 film) =

1967 Italian film

- Italian film poster
- Directed by: Elio Petri
- Screenplay by: Elio Petri; Ugo Pirro
- Based on: To Each His Own by Leonardo Sciascia
- Produced by: Giuseppe Zaccariello
- Starring: Gian Maria Volonté; Irene Papas; Gabriele Ferzetti; Mario Scaccia; Leopoldo Trieste; Laura Nucci; Luigi Pistilli; Salvo Randone
- Cinematography: Luigi Kuveiller
- Edited by: Ruggero Mastroianni
- Music by: Luis Enriquez Bacalov
- Production company: Cemofilm
- Distributed by: Panta Cinematografica (Italy); United Artists (International)
- Release date: 24 February 1967 (Italy)
- Running time: 92 minutes
- Country: Italy
- Language: Italian

We Still Kill the Old Way (Italian: A ciascuno il suo; lit. 'To each his own') is a 1967 Italian crime film directed by Elio Petri. It is based on the novel To Each His Own by Leonardo Sciascia.

== Plot ==
The death threats against the local pharmacist Arturo Manno do not surprise any of his friends because he is a known womanizer in his small town. They do not take his reports seriously until Manno, together with his friend Antonio Roscio, is killed while hunting one early morning. Suspicion falls on the father and two brothers of the Manno's underage servant Rosina, with whom Manno had an affair. Professor Laurana, who had seen one of the extortion letters, does not believe in the guilt of these illiterate men since the letters had been made with clippings from the Osservatore Romano, a Vatican newspaper with only two local subscribers.

Laurana asks his lawyer friend Rosello to take care of the prisoners, and begins his own research, also motivated by his secret love for Luisa Roscio, the widow of Manno's murdered companion. Roscio's father, who had been against his son's marriage to Luisa from the beginning, hands him over Roscio's diary, which has pages missing. From a friend and member of the Palermo city council, Laurana learns that Roscio had been fearing for his life because he was collecting evidence against a corrupt prominent citizen from Laurana's hometown. Roscio had been convinced that the death threats against Manno were a cover-up and that Roscio himself was actually the person in danger. Luisa, who rejects Laurana's advances but seemingly supports his research, tells him that she suspects her cousin Rosello to be involved in the case.

Laurana meets with Rosello, who takes him in his car to a mysterious appointment. Laurana, who realises that his own life is in danger now, pretends that he has left a diary with the details of his research in Palermo. The angry Rosello takes him back to the village and throws him out of the car. The next day, Laurana tells Luisa that he had only been bluffing and that his alleged diary doesn't exist. Luisa takes him to a place by the seaside, where she leaves him after again rejecting his blunt advances. A group of local men beats up Laurana, kills him and conceals his body by hiding him in a nearby structure and detonating explosives to bury him in the rubble. Some time later, Rosello and Luisa marry, watched by Rosello's and Laurana's acquaintances, who comment disparagingly on the scheme but also on Laurana's naivety.

== Cast ==
- Gian Maria Volonté as Professor Paolo Laurana
- Irene Papas as Luisa Roscio
- Gabriele Ferzetti as Advocate Rosello
- Salvo Randone as Professor Roscio
- Luigi Pistilli as Arturo Manno
- Laura Nucci as Roscio's mother
- Mario Scaccia as curate of Sant'Amo
- Luciana Scalise as Rosina
- Leopoldo Trieste as communist city council member
- Giovanni Pallavicino as Ragana
- Franco Tranchina as Dr. Antonio Roscio
- Anna Rivero as Mrs. Manno
- Orio Cannarozzo as Inspector La Marca
- Carmelo Oliviero as Archpriest Rosello
- Carlo Ferro
- Tanina Zappala
- Valentino Macchi

== Awards ==
- Best Screenplay Award at the 1967 Cannes Film Festival
- Nastro d'Argento for Best Director, Best Actor (Gian Maria Volonté) and Best Supporting Actor (Gabriele Ferzetti)
