= The Day of the Owl =

1961 crime novel by Leonardo Sciascia

- First edition
- Author: Leonardo Sciascia
- Original title: Il giorno della civetta
- Translator: Archibald Colquhoun and Arthur Oliver
- Language: Italian with some Sicilian
- Publication date: 1961
- Publication place: Italy
- English publication date: 1963
- Media type: Print
- Pages: 136 pp (English edition, softcover)
- ISBN: 1-59017-061-X
- Preceded by: Sicilian Uncles
- Followed by: The Council of Egypt

The Day of the Owl (Italian: Il giorno della civetta [il ˈdʒorno della tʃiˈvetta]) is a crime novel about the Sicilian Mafia by Leonardo Sciascia, finished in 1960 and published in 1961 by Einaudi.

The novel is renowned as "the first fictional work for a mainstream readership to openly call the Mafia a criminal organization, one pervading Sicily and thriving on the silent collusion of its citizens who claim to see and hear nothing, even when someone is gunned down before their eyes."

As the author wrote in his preface of the 1972 Italian edition, the novel was written at a time in which the existence of the Mafia itself was debated and often denied. Its publishing led to widespread debate and to renewed awareness of the phenomenon. The novel was an instant success, bringing Sciascia fame and authority. The novel received the Crotone Prize, a prominent Italian literary award, in 1962.

The novel is inspired by the assassination of Accursio Miraglia, a communist trade unionist, in Sciacca in January 1947. Damiano Damiani directed a movie adaptation in 1968.

As with all of Sciascia’s crime novels, The Day of the Owl is not a straightforward whodunit, whydunit, or howdunit, but rather a tense clash between the forces of good and evil, with an uncertain outcome that could tip in either direction. Sciascia used this story as refutation against the Mafia and the corruption, apparent to his eyes, that led all the way to Rome.

The Carabinieri major Renato Candida, posted in Agrigento from 1955-1957, served as the inspiration for Sciascia in his portrayal of Captain Bellodi. The two became good friends.

== Plot ==
In a small Sicilian town, early on a Saturday morning, a bus is about to leave the small piazza to head to the marketplace in the next town nearby. A gunshot is heard and the figure running for the bus is shot twice in the back, with what is discovered as a lupara (a sawn-off rifle that Sicilian Mafia clans use for their killings). The passengers and bus driver deny having seen the murderer.

A Carabinieri captain and former Civil War partisan from Parma, Bellodi, gets on the case, ruffling feathers in his contemporaries and colleagues alike. Soon he discovers a link that does not stop in Sicily, but goes onwards towards Rome and Minister Mancuso and Senator Livigni, to whom, he discovers, most suspects (including the local boss don Mariano Arena) are linked.

It seems that the man shot, Salvatore Colasberna, was the owner of a small construction company. He had been warned that he should pay the pizzo and take "protection" from mafiosi, but he refused. Although his company was only a very small one, the local Mafia decides to make an example of him and has him killed.

Bellodi obtains the killer's (Diego "Zecchinetta" Marchica) confession by pretending to have the confession of the man (Rosario Pizzuco) who hired him. Moreover Bellodi uses the names given by an informer (Calogero Dibella, known as "Parrinieddu"), who was killed in retaliation, to arrest the local mafia boss don Mariano Arena, who has money stashed away in many bank accounts that add up to more than his fallow fields would ever bring. He is attempting to take down an organization with many members involved in the police and government, and whose mere existence many Sicilians deny. He deliberately ignores the crime passionnel lead, which is often a handy excuse for Mafia killings.

During a sick leave of Bellodi in his hometown of Parma, the case against all three collapses because of false testimony, which gives an alibi to Marchica. The death of Paolo Nicolosi, a witness to the presence of the killer near the crime scene, is attributed to his wife's affair. The novel ends with Bellodi recounting his time in Sicily to his friends in Parma—who think that it all sounds very romantic—and thinking that he would return to Sicily even if it killed him.

== English translation ==
The novel was translated from the Italian by Archibald Colquhoun and Arthur Oliver, and first published as Mafia Vendetta in 1963 by Jonathan Cape in the UK and in 1964 by Alfred A. Knopf in the U.S. An English-language translation of The Day of the Owl is available in paperback under ISBN 1-59017-061-X (New York: NYRB Classics, 2003).

== Film adaptation ==
The novel was adapted into the film of the same name in 1968 by Damiano Damiani, starring Franco Nero as Captain Bellodi and Claudia Cardinale as Rosa Nicolosi. The film does take some liberties when compared to the novel, but overall maintains the same message.
