= The Knight and Death =

1988 novel by Leonardo Sciascia

- First edition
- Author: Leonardo Sciascia
- Original title: Il cavaliere e la morte
- Translator: Joseph Farrell
- Cover artist: Albrecht Dürer - Knight, Death and the Devil
- Language: Italian
- Publisher: Adelphi Edizioni
- Publication date: 1988
- Publication place: Italy
- English publication date: 1991
- Media type: Print
- Pages: 160 pp (English edition, softcover)
- ISBN: 1-86207-579-4
- Preceded by: Open Doors
- Followed by: The Mystery of Majorana

The Knight and Death (Italian: Il cavaliere e La Morte) is a crime novel by Leonardo Sciascia, published in 1988.

== Plot ==
The protagonist of the novel is a cultured and tenacious detective affected by a deadly disease (which is clearly a cancer, although it is never openly stated).

The detective, whose name we never learn (he is simply called "il Vice", as "the Vice Chief of Police") investigates the murder of lawyer Sandoz. His chief believes that Sandoz has been killed by a mysterious revolutionary group, but the detective is convinced that powerful businessman Aurispa is involved in the crime, and that the phoney revolutionary group has been invented ad hoc as a scapegoat to cover up the real reasons behind the murder.

The novel is permeated by a sense of impending death, as the increasingly ill and tired "Vice" tries to unravel the mystery.

== Significance of title ==
The title is a reference to the engraving Knight, Death and the Devil by Albrecht Dürer, often observed by the "Vice" as he thinks about his imminent death.
