= Emmy La Grua =

Italian operatic soprano (1831–1922)

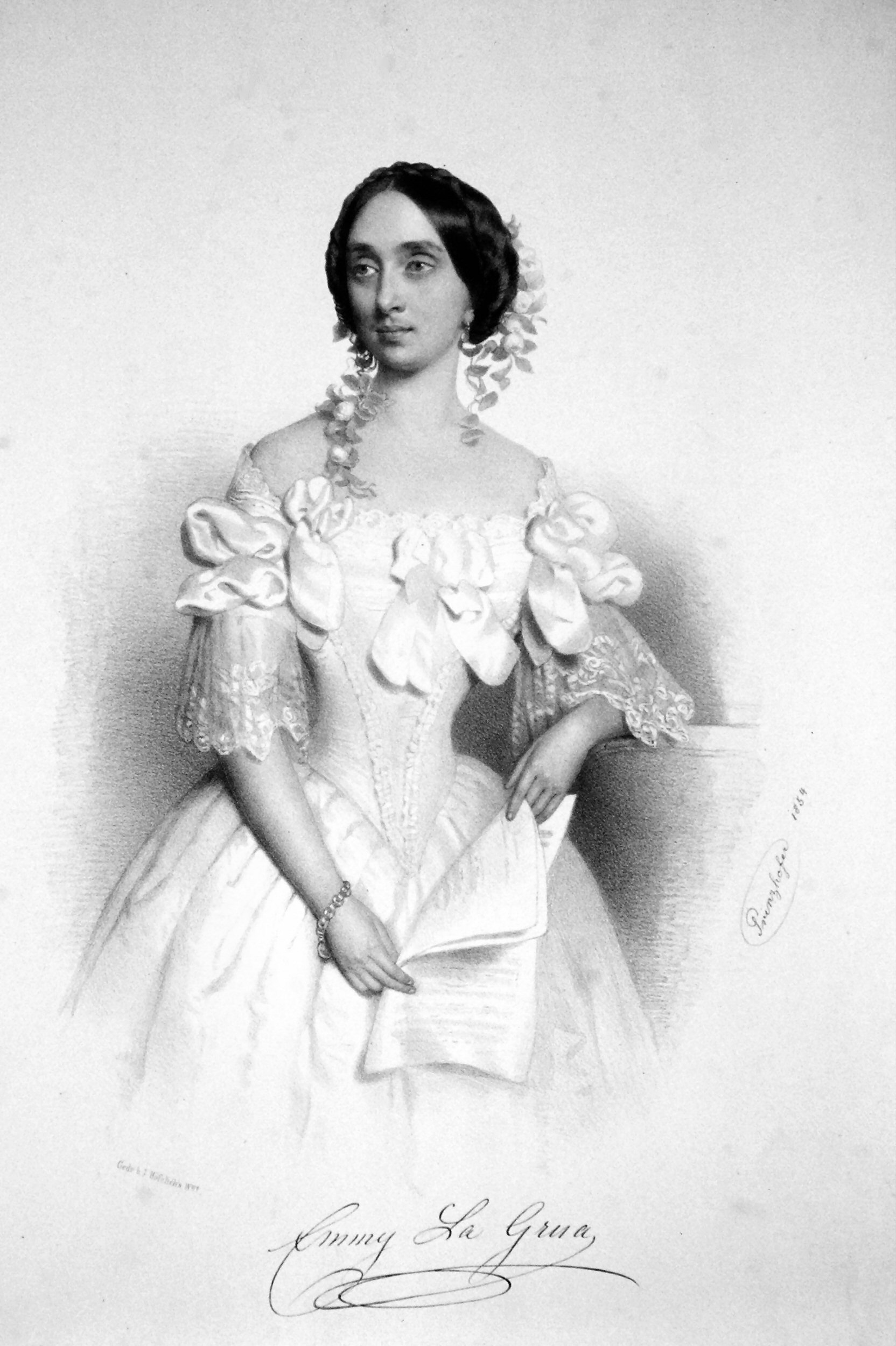
Emmy La Grua, Lithographie by August Prinzhofer, 1854

Emmy La Grua (also Emma, Emmi or Emilia) (15 May 1831, Palermo – 1922, Courbevoi) was a 19th-century Italian opera singer (soprano) who performed successfully internationally.

== Biography ==
Emmy La Grua was the daughter of the royal Saxon chamber musician Friederike Funk and the Italian tenorist Luigi La Grua. In 1837, she moved with her mother to Dresden. She received singing lessons from her mother as well as from Pauline Viardot-García and Caroline Ungher-Sabatier in Paris.

In December 1850, Emmy La Grua made her debut in Dresden as Alice in "Robert the Devil" by Giacomo Meyerbeer. Other roles included Donna Anna from Mozart's "Don Giovanni" and Rosine in The Barber of Seville by Gioachino Rossini. In the following years Emmy La Grua made guest appearances at the Paris Opera, from October 1853 as prima donna at the Vienna Court Opera, from 1854 in Turin and as well as further guest appearances in Vienna, Dresden and Lyon. In 1855, together with Cavaliere Antonio Porto, she undertook a two-year concert tour (with high fees) to Rio de Janeiro and Buenos Aires. Afterwards she gave performances again in Paris, Vienna as well as Pest (today Budapest), in Saint Petersburg, Berlin and Munich. In the meantime she lived again in Dresden in 1859. In 1862 the singer gave guest performances in Barcelona, in 1864 in London and in 1865 in Italy and Spain.

In 1867 she married in Palermo the colonel respectively general Giacinto Carini (1821–1880), an aide-de-camp of Giuseppe Garibaldi, and retired from the public sphere.
