= Isidoro Carini =

Monsignor Isidoro Carini
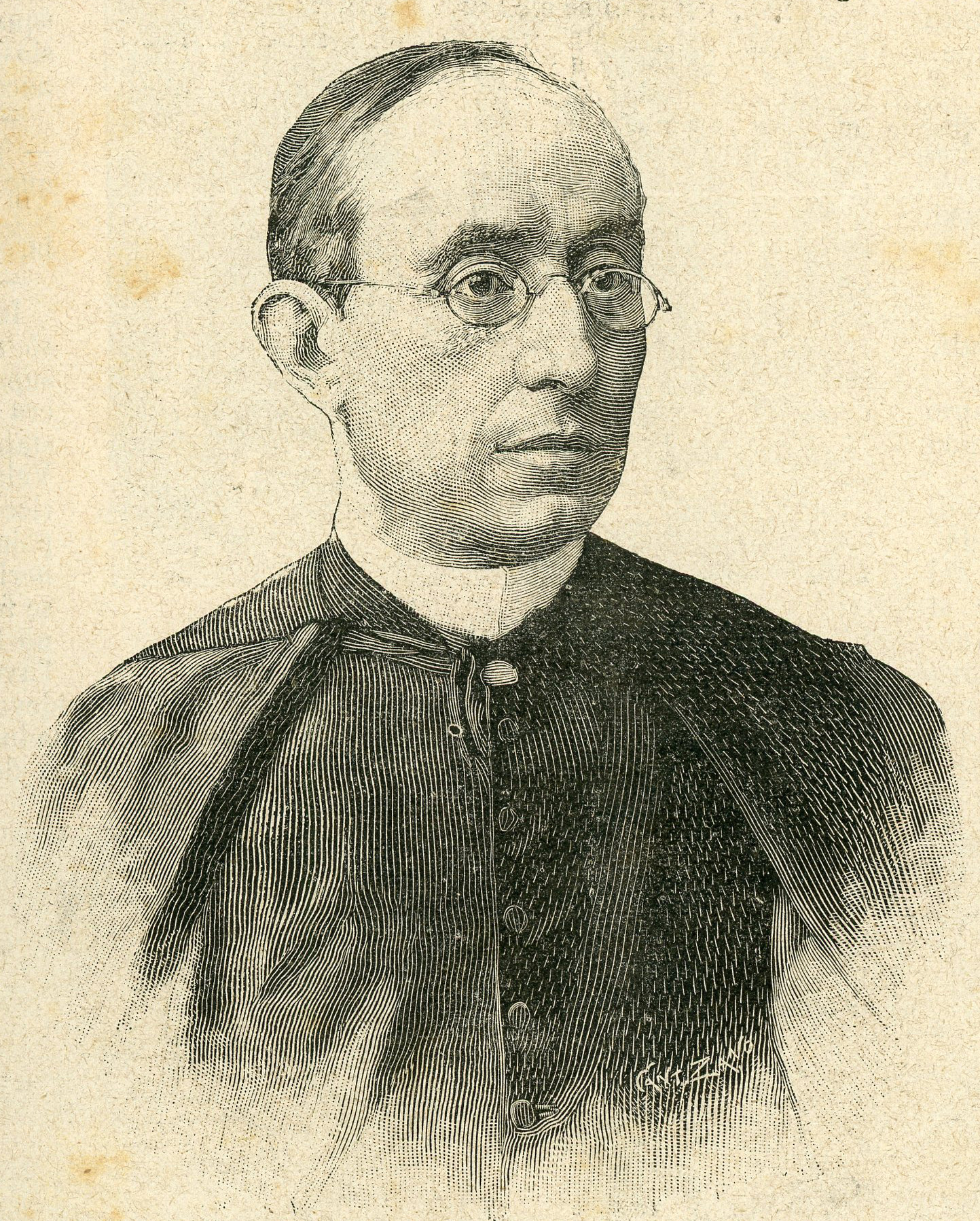
- Isidoro Carini
- Born: January 7, 1843; Palermo, Kingdom of the Two Sicilies
- Died: 25 January 1895 (aged 52); Rome, Kingdom of Italy
- Occupations: Catholic priest, university teacher, historian, palaeographer, journalist
- Parent(s): Giacinto Carini and Concetta Carini (née Testaferrata)

Academic work
- Discipline: History of Sicily, Medieval studies
- Institutions: Vatican School of diplomatic and archival paleography; Vatican Library
- Doctoral students: Johann Peter Kirsch

Isidoro Carini (7 January 1843, in Palermo – 25 January 1895, in Rome) was an Italian religious, teacher, historian and palaeographer.

== Biography ==
He attended the Jesuit college of Palermo and wanted to enter that Order, but was hindered by his father Giacinto Carini, who had participated, as battalion leader, in the action of the Thousand in Sicily, being wounded in Palermo. Pia Carini, Isidoro's younger sister, married the archaeologist Alfonso Bartoli, and Alfonso's sister, Maria, married Alfonso Battelli: Giulio Battelli, paleographer and historian, was born from the marriage.

Isidoro Carini was trained in the Congregation of the Oratory. In 1865, he founded the weekly L'Amico della religione, which ceased after the popular uprisings of Palermo in September 1866. In 1868, he was ordained a priest, and in the same year he founded the weekly Ape iblea. The following year he founded the bi-weekly La Sicilia Cattolica, which absorbed the previous one. In 1874, he was among the founders of the Sicilian Society for Homeland History.

In 1876, he was appointed professor of palaeography at the University of Palermo. He devoted himself to the edition of the Greek and Arab diplomas, present in the Sicilian archives. He was the first to be a lecturer in the School of palaeography and historical criticism - as the Vatican School of diplomatic and archival palaeography was then called - established by Pope Leo XIII, at the Vatican Secret Archive, with motu proprio of 19 May 1884. His appointment was as sub archivist of the Holy See and consultant of the Commission of Cardinals. In 1888, Isidoro Carini founded the Roman Society for Biblical Studies. In 1890, he was appointed by Pope Leo XIII as "first custodian" of the Vatican Apostolic Library.

On 26 January 1893 he became a member of the Turin Academy of Sciences.

== Bibliography ==
- Battelli, Giulio (1977). "Carini, Isidoro". Dizionario Biografico degli Italiani (in Italian). Vol. 20: Carducci–Carusi. Rome: Istituto dell'Enciclopedia Italiana. ISBN 978-88-12-00032-6.
