= Equal Danger =

1971 novel by Leonardo Sciascia

- First edition
- Author: Leonardo Sciascia
- Original title: Il contesto
- Translator: Adrienne Foulke
- Language: Italian
- Publication date: 1971
- Publication place: Italy
- English publication date: 1973
- Media type: Print
- Pages: 119 pp (first English edition, hardcover)
- ISBN: 0-06-013809-2
- Preceded by: La corda pazza
- Followed by: The Wine-Dark Sea

Equal Danger (Italian: Il contesto) is a 1971 detective novel by Leonardo Sciascia where a police inspector investigating a string of murders finds himself involved in existential political intrigues. Set in an indeterminate country, this novel is informed by the corrupt politics and the Mafia of Sciascia's experiences in 1970s Sicily.

== Plot summary ==
The book starts with the murder of District Attorney Vargas, who is prosecuting a high-profile case. The subsequent investigation failing, the police assign the protagonist Inspector Rogas, "the shrewdest investigator at the disposal of the police," to solve the case. While he is starting his investigation, two judges are killed. After Rogas discovers evidence of corruption surrounding the three government officials, he is encouraged by superiors "not to forage after gossip," but to trail the "crazy lunatic who for no reason whatever was going about murdering judges." This near admission of guilt drives Rogas to seek out those wrongfully convicted by the murdered judges.

Rogas finds his likely suspect in Cres, a man who was convicted of attempting to kill his wife. Mrs. Cres accused her husband of trying to kill her by poisoning her rice, which she escaped only because she fed a small portion first to her cat, who died. Rogas concludes that he was probably framed by his wife, and seeks him out, only to find that he has sneaked away from his house. Meanwhile, another district attorney is killed, and eyewitnesses see two young revolutionaries running away from the scene. Rogas, close to finding his man, is demoted, and told to work with the political division to pin the crimes on the revolutionary Left.

From this point, Rogas finds Galano, the editor of a revolutionary paper, and has his phone tapped. This leads to Rogas discovering the Minister of Justice at a party with many revolutionary leaders. After this, he and the Minister have a discussion, where the Minister claims he would prefer the revolution, but feels the country is not ready. Following this, Rogas speaks to the President of the Supreme Court, who details a philosophy of justice wherein the court is incapable of error by definition. He also discovers that his suspect, Cres, is in the same complex as the President, but Rogas does not pursue him, hoping that he will kill the President. After Rogas realizes that Cres lives in the complex under a pseudonym and wasn't there to commit a murder, he meets with the Secretary-General of the revolutionary party. Both of them are killed. The book ends with the murder of the Secretary-General being blamed on Rogas.

== Publication history ==
Equal Danger was re-published in paperback form in 2013 by NYRB Classics.

== Film adaptation ==
A film adaptation of Il contesto was directed by Francesco Rosi and released in Italy on 12 February 1976.
