= Giacinto Carini =

Italian politician

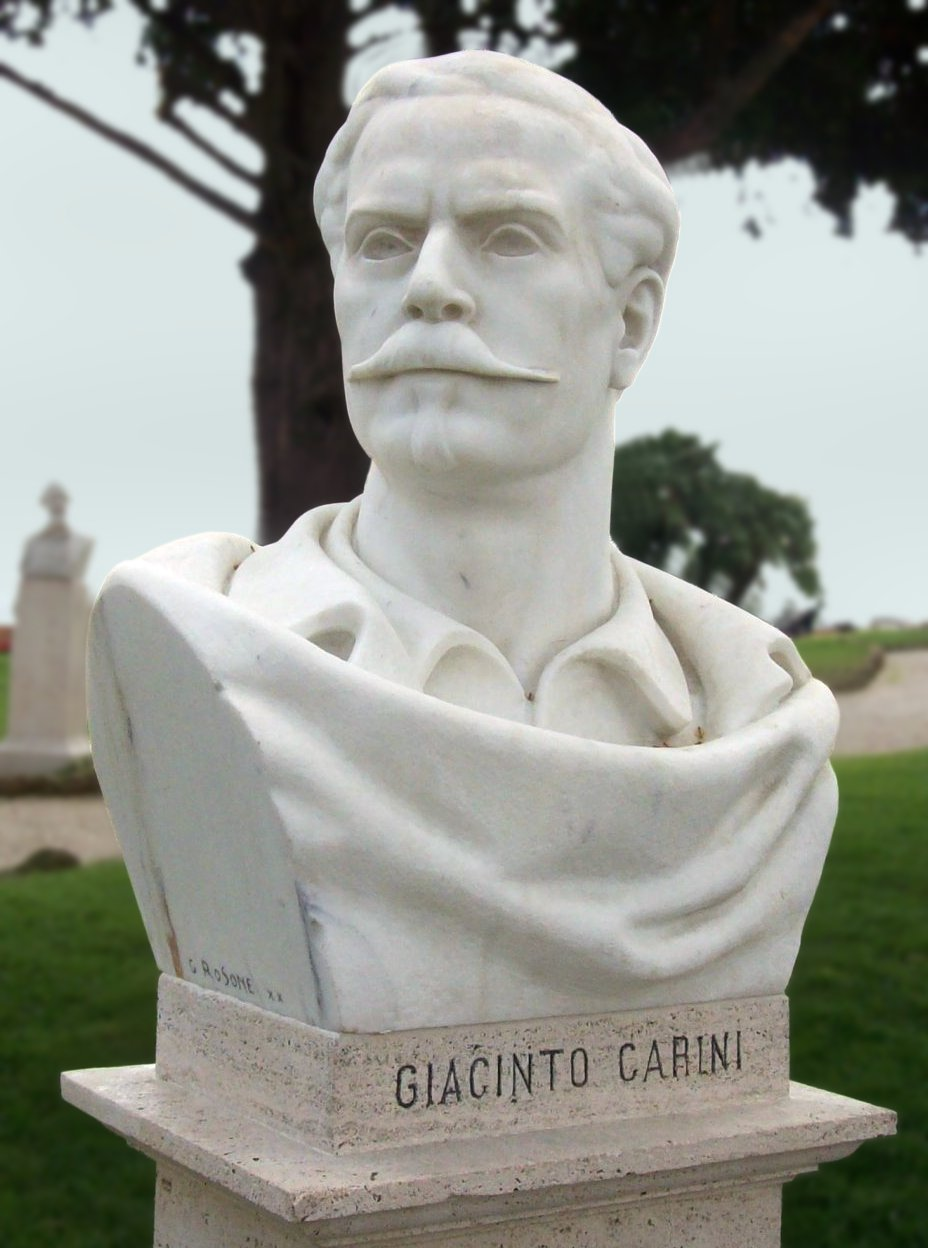
- Bust of Giacinto Carini

Deputy of the Kingdom of Italy
- Parliamentary group: Liberal-Conservative

Personal details
- Born: 20 May 1821 Palermo, Kingdom of the Two Sicilies
- Died: 16 January 1880 (aged 58) Rome, Kingdom of Italy
- Resting place: Palermo
- Party: Historical Right

Military service
- Allegiance: Kingdom of Sardinia; Kingdom of Italy
- Branch/service: Royal Sardinian Army; Royal Italian Army
- Years of service: 1859–1878
- Rank: Lieutenant general
- Unit: Cavalry
- Commands: Brigata Regina, Divisione di Perugia
- Battles/wars: Second Italian War of Independence; Expedition of the Thousand; Third Italian War of Independence

Giacinto Carini (Palermo, 20 May 1821 - Rome, 16 January 1880) was a politician and Italian patriot. He participated in the Sicilian independence revolution of 1848, was a Garibaldian, a general, and a member of Parliament.

== Biography ==
He was born in Palermo on 20 May 1821. When his father, Sicilian Finance Director, died, he inherited a large fortune, which he decided to dedicate in part to trade, becoming one of the first to introduce the use of steam machines for the husking of sumac. The great repression that followed the riots of '37 pushed him towards a liberal orientation; he had in friendship liberals like Mariano Stabile and Salvatore Vigo, who sometimes helped him in his agricultural entrepreneurship. In 1848, he participated in the Sicilian Revolution that broke out on 12 January: Carini was among the members of the First Committee.

He was appointed colonel by Ruggero Settimo (head of the government that was temporarily established), who entrusted him with the command of the 1st cavalry regiment: Giacinto Carini's task was to restore order in Burgio, in the district of Bivona in the province of Girgenti, a country in the throes of tumults and excesses.

When the Bourbon regime was restored in 1849, he found refuge in Paris, while maintaining an epistolary relationship with friends and political colleagues who remained in Sicily. During his residence in France, Carini got to know numerous exiled patriots, such as Giuseppe la Farina, and also exponents of the French cultural world, such as Victor Hugo, and Alexandre Dumas, of which remains a letter sent to Carini on the occasion of the battle of Milazzo, and of the expedition of Garibaldi's Thousand in Sicily. Due to the new contacts with exiles, he changed his political ideas, facing unitarianism. He protested against the retraction in Sicily of the deed of forfeiture of the Bourbon monarchy, and signed a protest against the decree of the king of Naples by which a debt of 20 million ducats had been imposed on the island, cancelling the '48 debt caused by the revolutionary government. While in Italy Cavourian politics and the monarchical project of unification take place, under the leadership of Garibaldi, Cavour and Vittorio Emanuele II, Carini follows the politics of his own country, also through the publication of a periodical whose printing was authorized by the same Napoleon III.

He lived in Paris until 1859, when he enlisted in the Hunters of the Alps, fighting in the second war of independence.

In 1860, driven by the desire to free Sicily from the dominion of the Bourbons, he joined the Thousand led by Giuseppe Garibaldi: he sailed with them from Quarto and fought bravely in the battles of Calatafimi, where with the rank of captain he commanded the 6th Company, and of Palermo, where he was in command of one of the two battalions that attacked the city. On 29 May 1860, he was seriously wounded by a bullet in his left arm at Porta di Termini, while he was pushing back the forces of Von Mekel, as recalled by a plaque walled up on the side of the wall where the door was once fixed. He was then appointed inspector general of the cavalry by Garibaldi. With the annexation, he was called to the Lieutenancy Council of Sicily and commander of the National Guard of Palermo. After the ' unification of Italy, by April 18, 1862 in' Italian regular army, where the rank of brigadier general fought in the Third War of Independence.

In 1867, he married the opera singer Emmy La Grua in Palermo.

He was elected member of parliament for five legislatures (from the eighth to the thirteenth) with the historical right, representing the constituency of Bivona, Palermo, Piacenza, Sant'Arcangelo di Romagna and Iesi from 1861 to 1880. Promoted to lieutenant general in 1871, he commanded the division of Perugia from 1871 to 1877. From 1878, he was made available by the war minister Mezzacapo, who, according to Carini, wanted to gradually remove him from the institutions as a Sicilian and a Garibaldian.

The wound caused by a bullet in 1860 could no longer heal, bringing torments and pains. He died in Rome on 16 January 1880: in 1912 the body was moved to his hometown, in the church of San Domenico [1]; a marble bust was dedicated to him inside the Falcone-Morvillo villa, in viale della Libertà in Palermo, and at the base of this sculpture there is an epigraph that reads these words: "To general Giacinto Carini, who magnanimous in exile, in the brave fight among the thousand, the mind the arm the heart, sacred to Italy Also in Rome on the Janiculumthere is a Bust of Giacinto Carini. Rome and Padua have dedicated a street to him.

His son Isidoro Carini (1843-1895) was a religious, a journalist and a distinguished historian and paleographer.

== See also ==
Giacinto Carini at Italian Wikipedia

== Bibliography ==
- Antonino Marrone, Il Distretto, il Circondario ed il Collegio Elettorale di Bivona (1812-1880), Bivona, Comune di Bivona, 1996.
- Brancato F., Lettere di Isidoro La Lumia a Giacinto Carini, Fondazione I. Mormino del Banco di Sicilia, Palermo 1966.
- Dumas A., La Battaglia di Milazzo: lettera di Alessando Dumas al brigadiere G. Carini, ispettor generale di cavalleria, Torelli, Firenze 1860.
- Giordano N., I tumulti popolari in Sicilia dopo la rivoluzione del 1848 e l’opera di G. Carini, in Il Risorgimento in Sicilia, n. s., III (1967).
- Lupo S., L’unificazione italiana:Mezzogiorno, rivoluzione, guerra civile, Donzelli, Roma 2011. Papandrea T., S. Vigo. Vita e carteggio, Acireale 1906, pp. 141 ss., pp. 158–161.
- Dizionario siciliani illustri, Confederazione fascista dei professionisti degli artisti, Ciuni Editore - Palermo 1939.
