= To Each His Own (novel) =

1966 novel by Leonardo Sciascia

- First edition
- Author: Leonardo Sciascia
- Original title: A Ciascuno Il Suo
- Translator: Adrienne Foulke
- Language: Italian
- Genre: Detective novel
- Publisher: Carcanet / Gli Adelphi
- Publication date: 1966
- Publication place: Italy
- English publication date: 1968
- Media type: Print (Paperback)
- Pages: 146
- ISBN: 978-0-85635-991-0
- OCLC: 28175434
- Preceded by: L'onorevole
- Followed by: La corda pazza

To Each His Own (Italian: A ciascuno il suo), first released in English as A Man's Blessing, is a 1966 detective novel by Leonardo Sciascia, in which an introverted academic (Professor Laurana), in attempting to solve a double-homicide, gets in too deep, with his naive interference in town politics.

== Plot summary ==
Dr. Manno, the town pharmacist, receives an anonymous letter made up of newspaper cuttings. The letter contains a death threat, but is dismissed by the locals as a practical joke. However, when Dr. Manno and his hunting companion, Dr. Roscio, are found murdered the next day, it becomes quite apparent that the letter was intended to do more than simply frighten the pharmacist from engaging in his favourite pastime.

Although the double-homicide is interesting gossip for the townspeople, nobody gives the motives for the murders a second thought, and it is assumed that the pharmacist would have known the reason for his murder and would have thus deserved the consequences. Everybody in the town continues with their daily lives after a short lapse of time apart from Professor Laurana.

When Dr. Manno initially received the letter, Laurana notices the word "UNICUIQUE" and proudly believes himself to be the only person with the knowledge to solve the case. For months, Laurana follows various leads, and before long finds himself entangled in a web of corruption from which he cannot escape. Prof. Laurana is soon regarded to be a threat by the perpetrators of the crime, and it does not take long before he too is murdered.

== Publication history ==
To Each His Own was first published in English under the title A Man's Blessing in 1968 by Harper & Row. It was reissued as To Each His Own by Carcanet Press in 1989, and by NYRB Classics in 2000. All English editions have used the same translation by Adrienne Foulke.

== Film adaptation ==
A film adaptation of To Each His Own was directed by Elio Petri and released in Italy on 22 February 1967. The film won several awards, including the Best Screenplay at the Cannes Film Festival and the Silver Ribbon in several categories at the Italian National Syndicate of Film Journalists.
