= Leonardo Sciascia =

Italian writer (1921–1989)

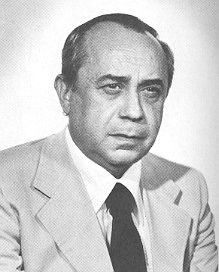

Member of the Chamber of Deputies
- In office 20 June 1979 – 11 July 1983
- Constituency: Rome

Member of the European Parliament for Central Italy
- In office 17 July 1979 – 24 September 1979

Personal details
- Born: 8 January 1921 Racalmuto, Kingdom of Italy
- Died: 20 November 1989 (aged 68) Palermo, Italy
- Party: PCI (1975–1977); PR (1979–1984)
- Occupation: Writer; novelist; journalist; political activist

Leonardo Sciascia (Italian: [leoˈnardo ʃˈʃaʃʃa]; 8 January 1921 – 20 November 1989) was an Italian writer, novelist, essayist, playwright, and politician. Some of his works have been made into films, including Porte Aperte (1990; Open Doors), Cadaveri Eccellenti (1976; Illustrious Corpses), Todo Modo (also 1976) and Il giorno della civetta (1968; The Day of the Owl).

== Biography ==
Sciascia was born in Racalmuto, Sicily, on 8 January 1921. In 1935, his family moved to Caltanissetta, where Sciascia studied under Vitaliano Brancati, who would become his model in writing and introduce him to French novelists. From Giuseppe Granata, future Communist member of the Italian Senate, Sciascia learned about the French Enlightenment and American literature. In 1944, he married Maria Andronico, an elementary school teacher in Racalmuto. In 1948, his brother committed suicide, an event which profoundly impacted Sciascia.

Sciascia's first work, Favole della dittatura (Fables of the Dictatorship), a satire on fascism in Italy, was published in 1950. This was followed in 1952 by La Sicilia, il suo cuore (Sicily, its Heart), his first and only poetry collection, illustrated by Emilio Greco. The following year Sciascia won the Premio Pirandello, awarded by the Sicilian Region, for his essay "Pirandello e il pirandellismo" ("Pirandello and Pirandellism").

In 1954, Sciascia began collaborating with literature and ethnology magazines published by Salvatore Sciascia in Caltanissetta. In 1956, he published Le parrocchie di Regalpetra (The Parishes of Regalpetra), an autobiographic novel inspired by his experience as an elementary school teacher in his home town. In the same year, he moved to teach in Caltanissetta, only to move again to Rome in 1957 where he struck up a lifelong friendship with Sicilian artist, Bruno Caruso. In the autumn of 1957, he published Gli zii di Sicilia (Uncles of Sicily), which includes sharp views about themes such as the influence of the U.S. and of communism in the world, and the 19th century unification of Italy.

After one year in Rome, Sciascia moved back to Caltanissetta, in Sicily. In 1961, he published Il giorno della civetta (The Day of the Owl), one of his most famous novels, about the Mafia, and in 1963, the historical novel Il consiglio d'Egitto (The Council of Egypt), set in 18th-century Palermo. After a series of essays, in 1965 he wrote the play L'onorevole (The Honorable), a denunciation of the complicities between government and the mafia. Another political mystery novel is 1966's A ciascuno il suo (To Each His Own).

The following year, Sciascia moved to Palermo. In 1969, he began a collaboration with Il Corriere della Sera. That same year he published the play Recitazione della controversia liparitana dedicata ad A.D. (Recitation of liparitana dispute dedicated to A.D.), dedicated to Alexander Dubček. In 1971, Sciascia returned again to mystery with Il contesto (The Challenge), which inspired Francesco Rosi's movie Cadaveri eccellenti (1976; Illustrious Corpses). The novel created Polemics, due to its merciless portrait of Italian politics, as did his novel Todo modo (1974; One Way or Another), due to its description of Italy's Catholic clergy.

At the 1975 communal elections in Palermo, Sciascia ran as an independent within the Italian Communist Party (PCI) slate and was elected to the city council. In the same year, he published La scomparsa di Majorana (The Disappearance of Majorana), dealing with the mysterious disappearance of scientist Ettore Majorana. In 1977, he resigned from PCI, due to his opposition to any dealing with Christian Democracy (DC). Later, he would be elected to the Italian and European Parliament with the Radical Party. Sciascia's last works include the essay collection Cronachette (1985), the novels Porte aperte (1987; Open Doors) and Il cavaliere e la morte (1988; The Horseman and Death). He died on 20 November 1989 in Palermo.

== Writing ==
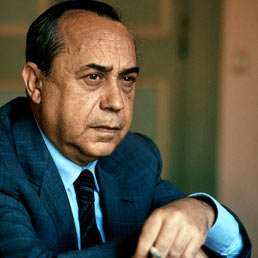
Sciascia as Member of the Chamber of Deputies, 1979

A number of his books, such as The Day of the Owl (Il giorno della civetta) and Equal Danger (Il contesto), demonstrate how the Mafia manages to sustain itself with the help of the anomie inherent in Sicilian life. He presented a forensic analysis of the kidnapping and assassination of Aldo Moro, a prominent Christian Democrat, in his book The Moro Affair.

Sciascia's work is intricate and displays a longing for justice while attempting to show how corrupt Italian society had become and remains. His linking of politicians, intrigue, and the Mafia gave him a high profile, which was very much at odds with his private self. This high profile resulted in his becoming widely disliked for his criticism of Giulio Andreotti, then Prime Minister, for his lack of action to free Moro and answer the demands of the Brigate Rosse (Red Brigades).

In 1979, Sciascia was elected for the Radical Party in the House of Deputies and became a member of the committee of the House for the investigation into Moro's kidnapping, which stated that there was a certain amount of negligence on the part of the Christian Democrat Party in their stance that the state was bigger than a person, and that they would not swap Moro for 13 political prisoners, even though Moro himself had stated that the swapping of innocent people for political prisoners was a valid option in negotiations with terrorists. However, senior members of the party disagreed with this stance and were of the view that Moro had been drugged and tortured to utter these words. Out of this experience, Sciascia wrote an important book.

Sciascia wrote of his unique Sicilian experience, linking families with political parties, the treachery of alliances and allegiances, and the calling of favours that result in outcomes that do not benefit society, but those individuals who are in favor. His books are rarely characterized by a happy ending or by justice for the ordinary man. A prime example of this is Equal Danger (1973; Il Contesto), in which the police's best detective is drafted to Sicily to investigate a spate of murders of judges. Focusing on the inability of authorities to handle such an investigation into the corruption, Sciascia's hero is finally thwarted. His 1984 opus, Occhio di Capra (Goat's Eye), is a collection of Sicilian sayings and proverbs gathered from the area around his native village, to which he was intensely attached throughout his life.

== Works ==
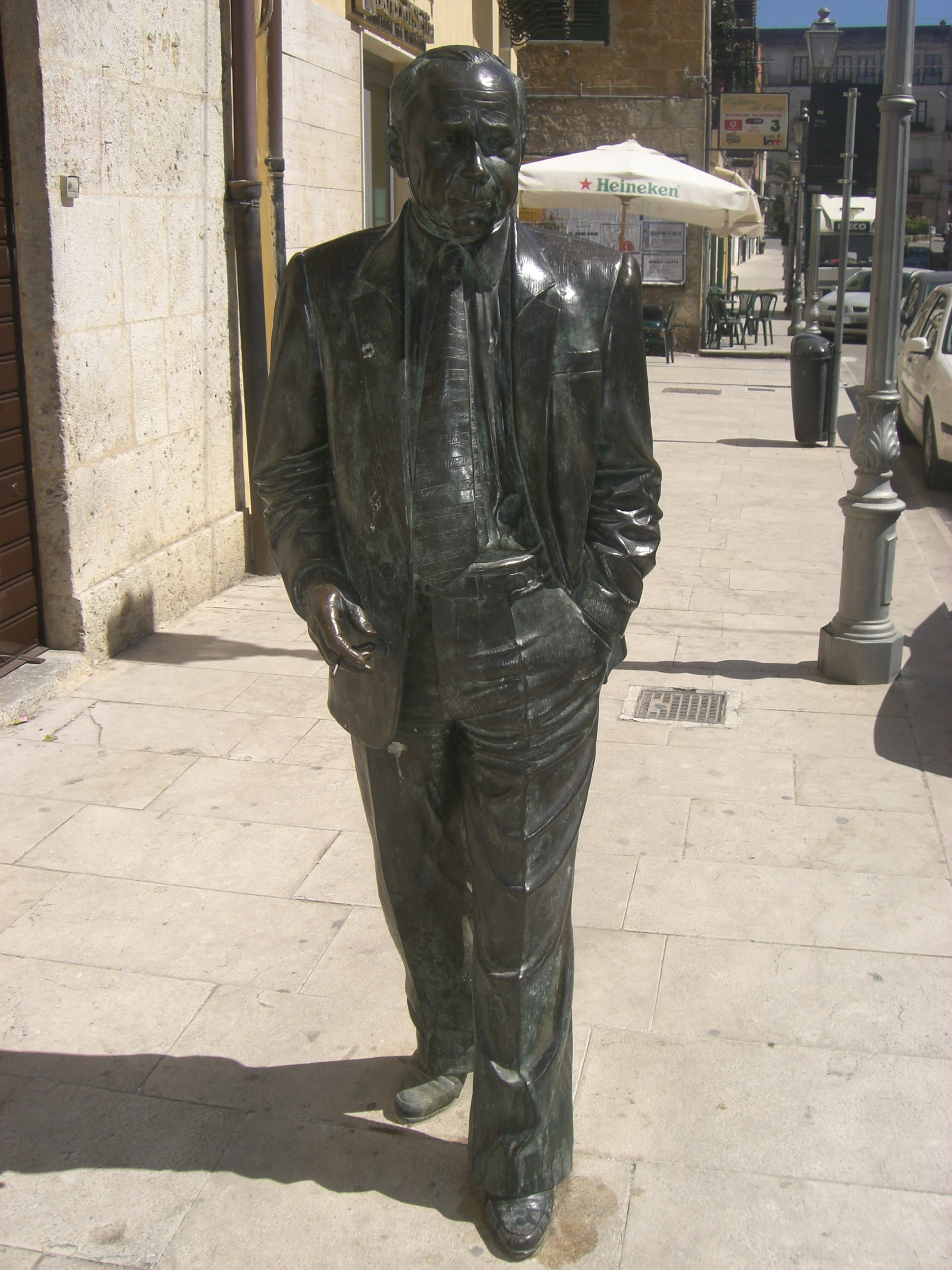
His statue in Racalmuto

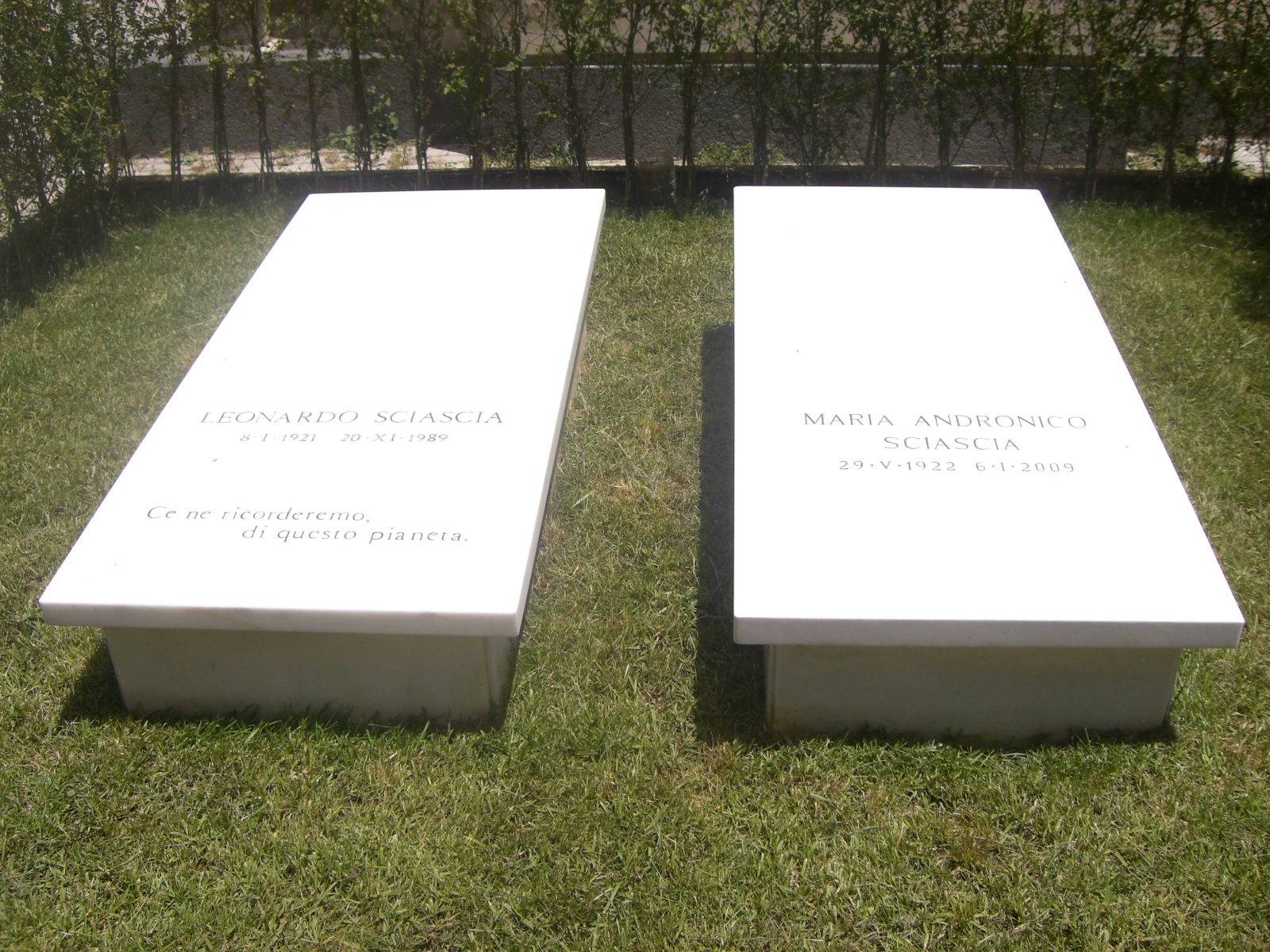
His tombstone in Racalmuto

- Le favole della dittatura (1950)
- La Sicilia, il suo cuore (1952)
- Il fiore della poesia romanesca. Belli, Pascarella, Trilussa, Dell'Arco (1952)
- Pirandello e il Pirandellismo (1953)
- Le Parrocchie di Regalpetra (1st ed. 1956, 2nd augmented ed. 1963) (Salt in the Wound, trans. Judith Green (1969))
- Gli zii di Sicilia (1st ed. 1958, 2nd augmented ed. 1961) (Sicilian Uncles, trans. N.S. Thompson (1986)) – short stories
- Il Giorno della Civetta (1961) (Mafia Vendetta, trans. Archibald Colquhoun and Arthur Oliver (1963); republished as The Day of the Owl (1984))
- Pirandello e la Sicilia (1961)
- Il consiglio d’Egitto (1963) (The Council of Egypt, trans. Adrienne Foulke (1966))
- Santo Marino (1963)
- Morte dell'inquisitore (1964) (Death of the Inquisitor, trans. Judith Green (1969); Death of an Inquisitor and other stories, trans. Ian Thomson (1990) (published with translations of Cronachette (1985) and Le strega e il capitano (1986))
- L'onorevole (1965)
- Jaki (1965)
- I mafiosi (written 1965, published 1972) – an adaptation of the play I mafiusi di la Vicarìa by Giuseppe Rizzotto and Gaspare Mosca
- A ciascuno il suo (1966) (A Man's Blessing, trans. Adrienne Foulke (1968); republished as To Each His Own (1992))
- Racconti siciliani (1966)
- Recitazione della controversia liparitana dedicata ad A.D. (1969)
- La corda pazza (1970)
- Atti relativi alla morte di Raymond Roussel (1971)
- Il contesto. Una parodia (1971) (Equal Danger, trans. Adrienne Foulke (1973))
- Il Mare Colore del Vino (1973) (The Wine-Dark Sea, trans. Avril Bardoni (1985)) – collected short stories
- Todo Modo (1974) (One Way or Another, trans. Adrienne Foulke (1977); Sacha Rabinovich (1987))
- La Scomparsa di Majorana (1975) (The Mystery of Majorana, trans. Sacha Rabinovich (1987))
- I pugnalatori (1976)
- Candido, ovvero, un sogno fatto in Sicilia (1977) (Candido, or A Dream Dreamed in Sicily, trans. Adrienne Foulke (1979))
- L'affaire Moro (1st ed. 1978, 2nd augmented ed. 1983) (The Moro Affair, trans. Sacha Rabinovich (1987))
- Dalle parti degli infedeli (1979)
- Nero su nero (1979)
- Il teatro della memoria (1981)
- La sentenza memorabile (1982)
- Cruciverba (1983)
- Stendhal e la Sicilia (1984)
- Occhio di capra (1st ed. 1984, 2nd augmented ed. 1990)
- Cronachette (1985) (Little Chronicles trans. Ian Thomson (1990) (published with translations of Morte dell'inquisitore (1964) and Le strega e il capitano (1986))
- Per un ritratto dello scrittore da giovane (1985)
- La strega e il capitano (1987) (The Captain and the Witch, trans. Ian Thomson (1990) (published with translations of Morte dell'inquisitore (1964) and Cronachette (1985)
- 1912+1 (1986) (1912 + 1, trans. Sacha Rabinovitch (1989))
- Porte Aperte (1987) (Open Doors, trans. Marie Evans (1991))
- Il Cavaliere e la Morte (1988) (The Knight and Death, trans. Joseph Farrell (1991))
- Alfabeto pirandelliano (1989)
- Fatti diversi di storia letteraria e civile (1989)
- Una storia semplice (1989) (A Straightforward Tale, trans. Joseph Farrell (1991); A Simple Story, trans. Howard Curtis (2010))
- A futura memoria (se la memoria ha un futuro) (1989)

== Bibliography ==
=== In Italian on Sciascia's works ===
- Leonardo Sciascia, a cura di Sebastiano Gesù, Giuseppe Maimone Editore, Catania 1992
- Narratori siciliani del secondo dopoguerra, a cura di Sarah Zappulla Muscarà, Giuseppe Maimone Editore, Catania, 1990
- Cadaveri eccellenti, a cura di Sebastiano Gesù, Giuseppe Maimone Editore, Catania, 1992
- V. Fascia, F. Izzo, A. Maori, La memoria di carta: Bibliografia delle opere di Leonardo Sciascia, Edizioni Otto/Novecento, Milano, 1998
- V. Vecellio (a cura di), L'uomo solo: L'affaire Moro di Leonardo Sciascia, Edizioni La Vita Felice, Milano, 2002
- V. Vecellio, Saremo perduti senza la verità, Edizioni La Vita Felice, Milano, 2003
- G. Jackson, Nel labirinto di Sciascia, Edizioni La Vita Felice, Milano, 2004
- L. Palazzolo Leonardo Sciascia deputato radicale 1979–1983, Kaos edizioni, 2004
- L. Pogliaghi (a cura di), Giustizia come ossessione: forme della giustizia nella pagina di Leonardo Sciascia, Edizioni La Vita Felice, Milano, 2005
- M. D'Alessandra e S. Salis (a cura di), Nero su giallo: Leonardo Sciascia eretico del genere poliziesco, Edizioni La Vita Felice, Milano, 2006
- P. Milone, L'enciclopedia di Leonardo Sciascia: caos, ordine e caso : atti del 1○ ciclo di incontri (Roma, gennaio-aprile 2006), Quaderni Leonardo Sciascia, 11. Milano: La Vita Felice, 2007
- R. Martinoni, Troppo poco pazzi: Leonardo Sciascia nella libera e laica Svizzera (Collana Sciascia scrittore europeo, I, in collaboration with Amici di Leonardo Sciascia) Leo S. Olschki editore, Firenze: Leo S. Olschki editore, 2011
- I. Thomson, Una conversazione a Palermo con Leonardo Sciascia, Rubbetino Editore, 2022

=== In English on Sciascia's works ===
- Giffuni, Cathe (Spring–Summer 1989). "A Bibliography of the Mystery Writings of Leonardo Sciascia". Clues: A Journal of Detection. 10 (1): 75–87.
- L. Sciascia, M. Padovani, Sicily as Metaphor, Marlboro: Marlboro Press, 1994
- J. Farrell, Leonardo Sciascia, Writers of Italy. Edinburgh: Edinburgh University Press, 1995
- G. Ania, Fortunes of the Firefly: Sciascia's Art of Detection, Market Harborough: University Texts, 1996
- R. Glynn, Contesting the Monument: The Anti-Illusionist Italian Historical Novel, Italian perspectives, 10. Leeds, England: Northern Universities Press, 2005
- J. Cannon. The Novel As Investigation: Leonardo Sciascia, Dacia Maraini, and Antonio Tabucchi, Toronto Italian studies. Toronto: University of Toronto Press, 2006
