= Calogero =

Italian given, family and place name

- Pronunciation: Italian: [kaˈlɔːdʒero]
- Gender: Male
- Language: Italian
- Name day: June 18

Origin
- Origin: Greek

Other names
- See also: Calogera, Calogerus

Calogero (from the Greek: καλόγερος, romanized: kalógeros, a familiar term for a monk) is common given name and family name, and a place name of Greek origin.

== Variants ==
- (Masculine): Calocero
  - (Hypocoristic): Calò, Gero, Gerino
- Feminine: Calogera, Calocera

=== Variants in other languages ===
- Catalan: Calógero, Calogerio, Calocer
- English: Charles
- Ancient Greek: Καλόγερος (Kalogeros)
- Latin: Calogerus, Calocerus
- Polish: Kaloger
- Russian: Калогер (Kaloger)
- Sicilian: Calòjiru, Calòriju
- Spanish: Calógero, Calógerio, Calocero

== Origin and diffusion ==
Derived from the Ancient Greek: καλόγερος, romanized: kalogeros, composed of Ancient Greek: καλός, romanized: kalos (Ancient Greek "fair"; Modern Greek "good") and Ancient Greek: γέρων, romanized: geron ("old man", "old") and literally means "nice old man", "one who has nice old age""; the first element is reminiscent of such names as Calliope and Callimachus, while the second is reminiscent of the name Gerontius. A second interpretation, not generally accepted, is that the second element is the Greek keros (grain), according to which the name would mean "good grain".

Historically, in the ambit of Greek Orthodoxy, the term caloyer is used as a name for a monk or a hermit, in a manner that translates as "brother" or "monk", a significance that is retained in Modern Greek.

The name is traditionally found in and is characteristic of Sicily, bestowed by the cultus of Saint Calogerus the Anchorite, a monk and hermit near Sciacca; in the province of Agrigento, Calogero is the third-most widespread masculine name, but it is well-attested in the whole of the island.

== Feast days ==
The feast day is celebrated on June 18 in honour of Saint Calogerus, exorcist and hermit in Sicily. Other feast dates recorded for the name are:

- February 11, Saint Calogerus, Bishop of Ravenna and confessor
- April 18, Saint Calocerus, Roman soldier and martyr at Albenga under Hadrian
- 19 May, Saint Calocerus the Eunuch, brother of Saint Parthenius, martyred under Decius, commemorated together with Parthenius

== People ==
=== Mononym ===
- Calogero (singer) (born 1971 in Échirolles as Calogero Joseph Salvatore Maurici), French singer-songwriter

=== Given name ===
- Calogero Bagarella (1935–1969), Italian criminal and member of the Sicilian Mafia
- Calogero "Jerry" Calà (born 1951), Italian comedian and filmmaker
- Calogero "Charly" Chiarelli (born 1948), Italian-Canadian writer, storyteller, actor and musician
- Calogero Conti (1924–2020), commonly referred to as "Zu Liddu", Sicilian mafioso
- Calogero Lo Giudice (1938–2021), Italian politician
- Calogero Minacore (1910–1993), also known as Carlos "The Little Man" Marcello, Italian-American mafioso who became the boss of the New Orléans crime family
- Calogero "Chazz" Palminteri (born 1952), American actor, screenwriter and producer; descended from immigrants from Agrigento, Sicily
- Calogero Pisano (born 1981), Italian politician
- Calogero Rizzuto (architect) (1955–2020), Italian architect and historic preservationist
- Calogero "Don Calò" Vizzini (1877–1954), historical Mafia boss of Villalba in the Italian province of Caltanissetta, Sicily

=== Surname ===
- Fiorenza Calogero (born 1978), Italian singer and actress
- Francesco Calogero (1935–2026), Italian physicist and peace activist
  - Calogero conjecture, minority interpretation of quantum mechanics (attributed to Francesco Calogero)
  - Calogero–Degasperis–Fokas equation, the nonlinear partial differential equation (jointly attributed to Francesco Calogero)
- Guido Calogero, Italian philosopher, thinker, activist, and Partito d'Azione politician
- Nicholas J. Calogero (1924–2004), American politician
- Pascal F. Calogero Jr. (1931–2018), American judge

=== Fictional ===
- Calogero "C" Anello, the son / main character in A Bronx Tale
- Calogero "Clay" Appuzzo, a character in Showtime's drama I'm Dying Up Here, portrayed by Sebastian Stan
- Calogero, chef/owner of one of Inspector Montalbano's local osterias in the eponymous TV series set in Sicily, portrayed by Giuseppe Mascellino
- Calogera "Al" Culcher, a personality in numerous comedy stylings of Aldo, Giovanni & Giacomo
- Calogero Sedara, a character in the romance Il Gattopardo by Giuseppe Tomasi di Lampedusa
- Calogero Di Spelta, a character in the comedy La grande magia by Eduardo De Filippo
- Calogero (called Calò), a character in The Godfather and The Godfather: Part III, portrayed by Franco Citti
