= Monte Kronio =

Mountain in Italy

- Location within Sicily

Highest point
- Elevation: 395.48 m (1,297.5 ft)
- Coordinates: 37°31′08″N 13°06′50″E

Geography
- Location: Province of Agrigento, Sicily, Italy

Monte Kronio, or Monte San Calogero, is a hill about 7 km from Sciacca, a comune of the province of Agrigento in Sicily.

== Description ==
With a height of 395.48 metres, the hill is composed mostly of limestone. It is a nature reserve administered by the state forestry agency of the Regione Siciliana.

On the mountain is the "Sanctuary of San Calogero," from the 16th century, the Antiquarium and various natural caves which emit geothermal gas, the most well-known of which is the so-called "Stove of San Calogero."

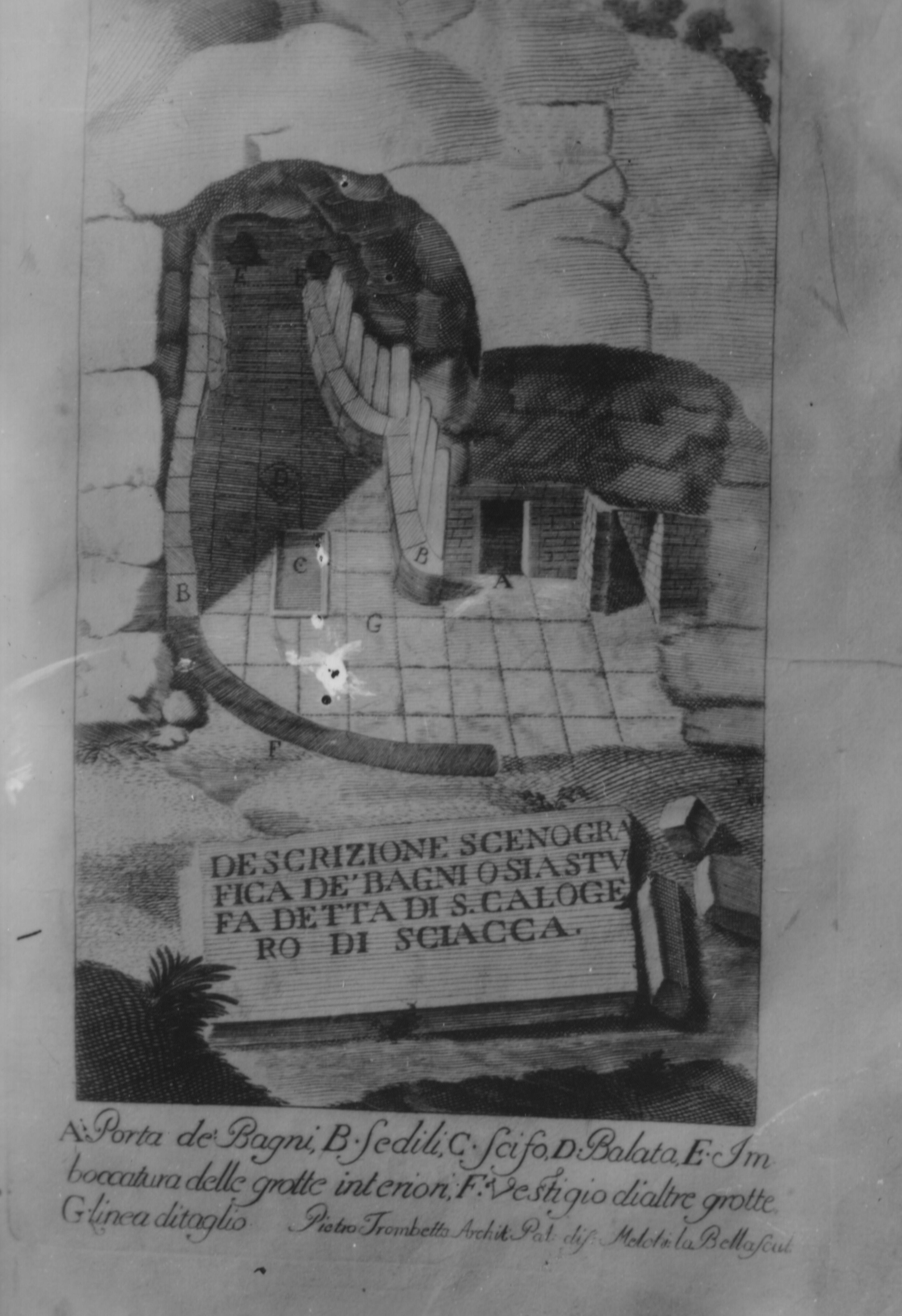
Cave inscription

The vast area behind the settlement of Sciacca, which culminates in Monte Kronio, may be the site of an ancient volcano, which even today shows some activity, however slight, through the emission of sulphur vapours. This theory is supported by the presence of Graham Island off the coast, a volcanic island forming part of a wider "Empedoclean" system, so it cannot be ruled out that Monte Kronio was a vent of a larger volcanic system in the distant past.

== Antiquarium of Monte Kronio ==
On the mountain there is the "Antiquarium di Monte Kronio - Stufe di S. Calogero" museum, a thermal complex and a series of karst caves which were used for health purposes in antiquity. The antiquarium was established in the 1980s and contains discoveries from local excavations. The site is managed by the Soprintendenza of cultural heritage for Agrigento.

=== The "Stove of San Calogero" ===
The cave with this name is 9.4 metres long and 4.2 metres wide and reaches a maximum height of c. 4 metres. Inside the temperature varies between 36 and 42 °C, depending on the season and time of day.

Because of the high temperature, people once spent time in the cave, which was created by Daedalus in the territory of the Sicans according to legend, as a cure for arthritis rheumatism, gout, and sciatica. Seats, benches and drilled holes into which effected limbs must have been inserted were carved in the interior walls.

Following a survey carried out in 1880 by professor Silvestro Zinno on behalf of the comunale council of Sciacca, the comune proposed to turn this into a spa.

== Sanctuary of San Calogero ==
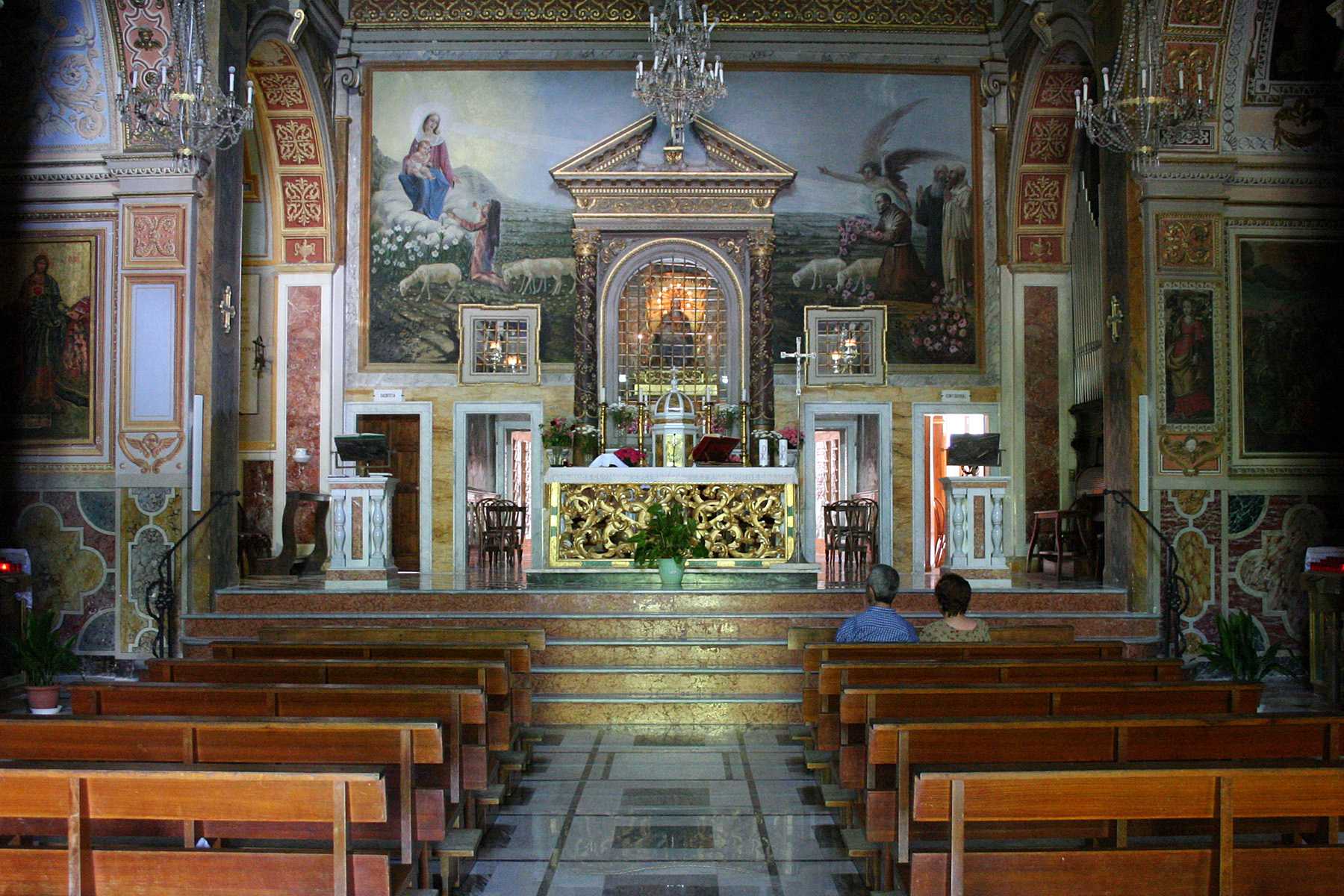
The basilica sanctuary of San Calogero

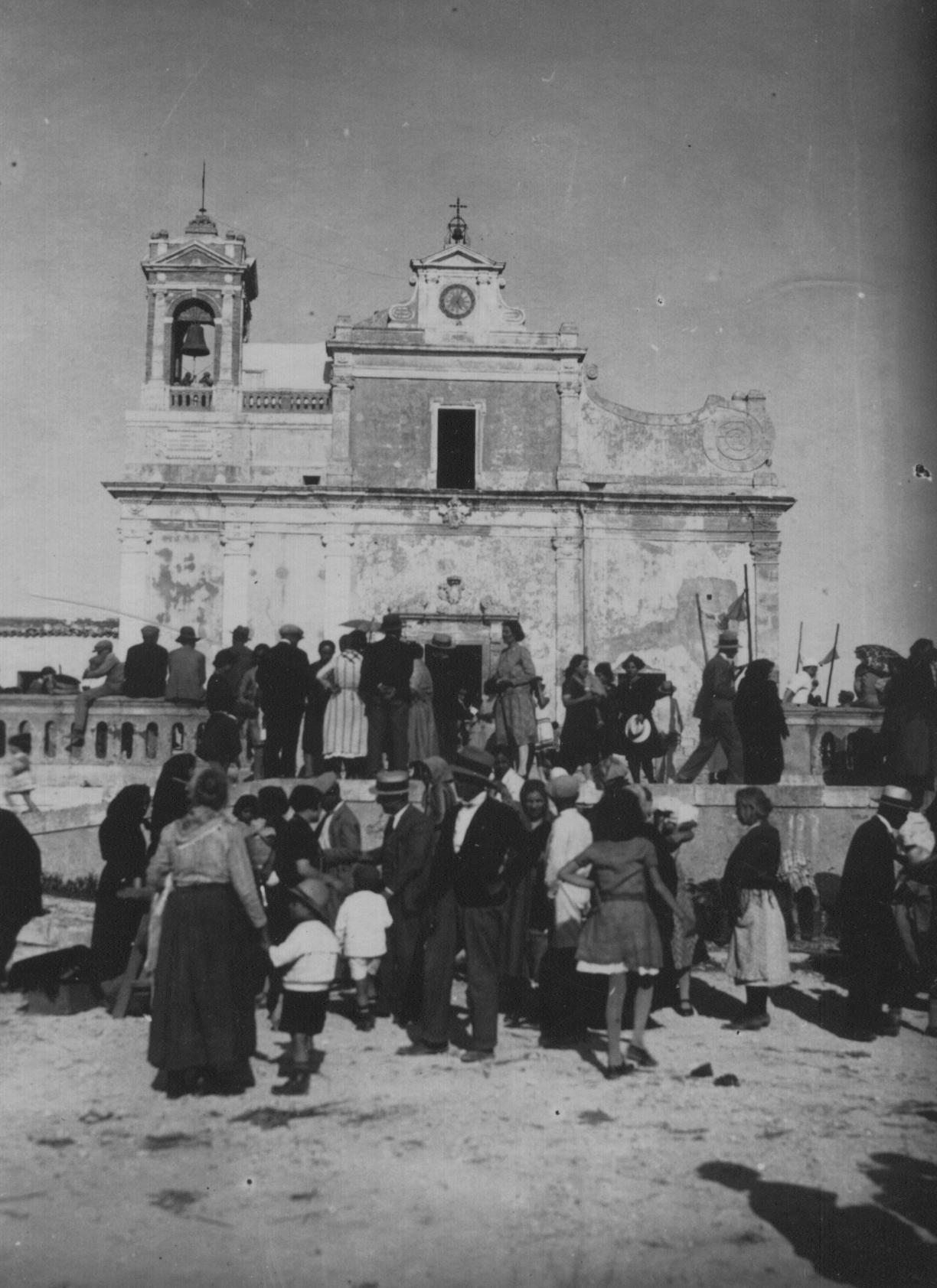
Some pilgrims at the sanctuary

The basilica sanctuary of San Calogero was built in 1530 and belonged to the Third Order Regular of St. Francis of Penance from 1948. Pope John Paul II raised it to the status of a minor basilica in 1979. It contains a statue of the saint, made by Antonello Gagini.

== Ancient winemaking ==
In 2012 Copper Age jars dating from the fourth millennium BC were found in a cave on Monte Kronio. Organic samples taken from the jars proved to contain tartaric acid and its salt, confirming the use of the vessel as wine containers. The site is the location of one of the earliest known evidences of winemaking, dating back 6000 years, a similar age to the evidence from Areni in Armenia.

== See also ==
- Saint Calogerus the Anchorite
- it:Coppa Monte Kronio
