= Gerondas =

Elder in the Greek Orthodox Church

A Gerondas, (Greek: Γέροντας) is an Elder in the Greek Orthodox Church, similar to the Starets of the Russian Orthodox Church. They are usually monks, particularly Hieromonks. The female equivalent would be a Gerontissa (Γερόντισσα).

== See also ==
- Caloyers
