= Caloyers =

Greek monks who followed the rule of Saint Basi

The Caloyers (Ancient Greek: καλόγερος, kalos ghérôn, "good old men"), also spelled Calogers or Calogeri, were Greek monks who followed the rule of Saint Basil. Both male and female, they inhabited Mount Athos (only men), and disseminated throughout many of the churches of the East. They lived either in monasteries, as at Mount Athos and Meteora or insulated in hermitages, devoted to agriculture and prayer.

There was never any reform among them; they retained their original institution and former habits, with minute exactness. Tavernier observed that they lived an isolated, austere life, eating no meat, and maintained four lents, besides numerous other fasts, with great strictness: they ate no food till they had earned it by the labor of their hands. During their lents, some did not eat more than once in three days, others only twice in seven.

They were divided into three ranks or degrees: the novices, called Archari; the moderately accomplished, called Microschemi (Μικρόσχημοι); and the perfect, called Megaloschemi (μεγαλόσχημοι). This last rank was divided into the following: Coenobites, who spent the day reciting their offices, from midnight to sunset; Anchorites, who left the community to live alone, only going outside on Sundays and holidays to perform devotions at monasteries; and Recluses, who lived alone in grottos and caverns, on the mountains, and survived on alms furnished to them by the monasteries.

== See also ==
- Gerondas
- Hesychasm
- Eastern Orthodox Monks
- Calogero – Italian given, family and place name
- Calogerus the Anchorite – Eremite monk venerated by the Orthodox and the Catholic churches

== Sources ==
- McClintock, John and James Strong. "Caloyers". Cyclopedia of Biblical, Theological & Ecclesiastical Literature. Baker Academic. 1982. ISBN 0-8010-6123-7.
- Gardner, James. Faiths of the World. Kessinger Publishing. 2003. ISBN 0-7661-4303-1. Page 248
- Webster, Noah. American Dictionary of the English Language. 1828.
