= Second case of Sciacca =

Conflict fought between noble families of Sicily, Italy

- Part of Case of Sciacca
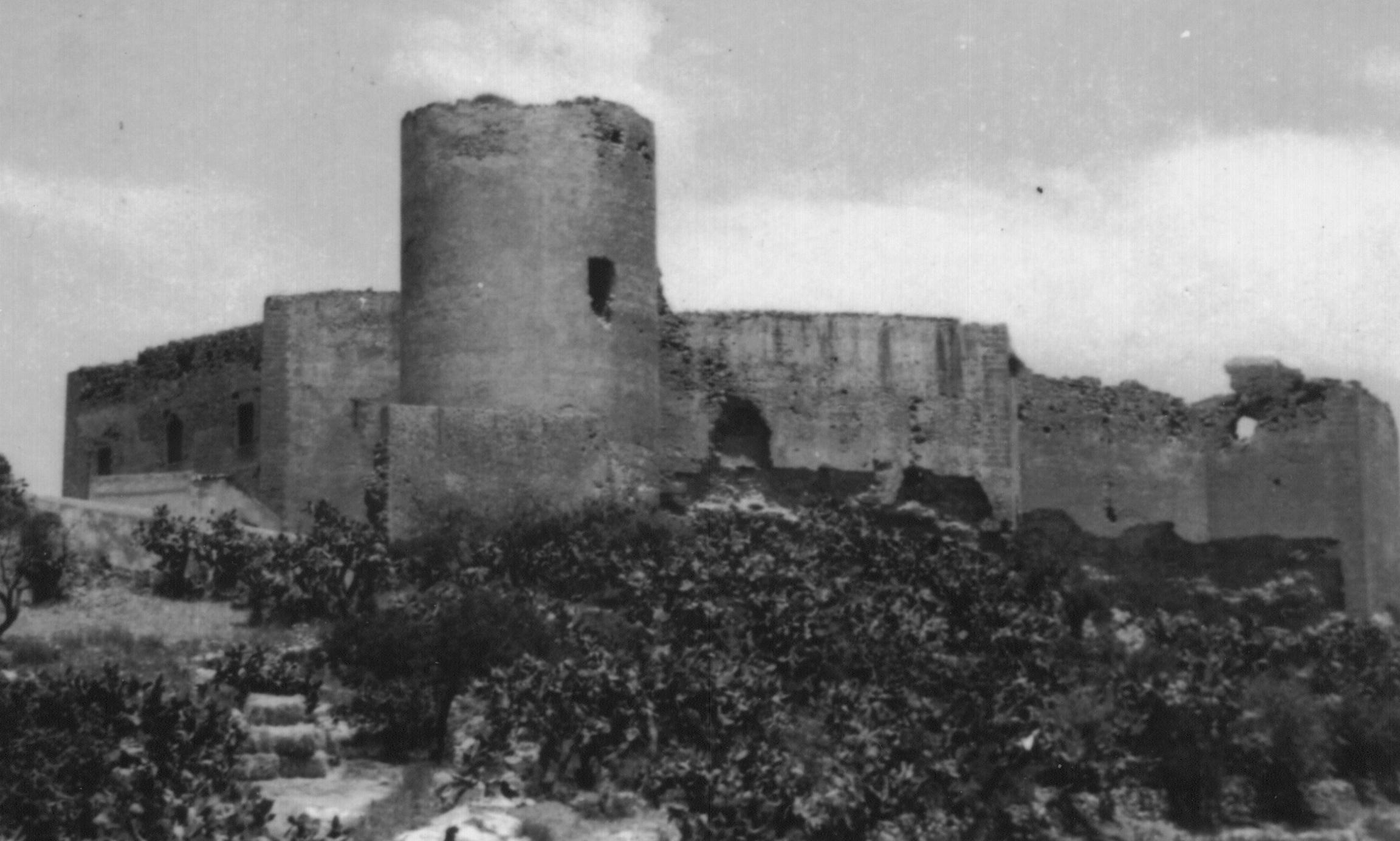
- The Castle of the Luna in Sciacca
| Date | 1529–1530 |
| Location | Bivona and Sciacca |
| Result | Death of Sigismondo II de Luna and Giacomo Perollo |

Belligerents
| Armed Forces of the De Luna; Bravi of Count de Luna; Arbëreshë of Giorgio Comito | Armed forces of the Perollo family Troops sent by the viceroy of Sicily; Troops sent by the marquis of Geraci; Troops sent by the princes of Castelvetrano and Partanna |

Commanders and leaders
| Sigismondo de Luna | Giacomo Perollo; Federico Perollo |

The second case of Sciacca, sometimes also referred to as the third, was the concluding part of the violent conflict fought between Sicily's noble families of de Luna and Perollo between 1455 and 1529, referred to as the "case of Sciacca." The main phases of the conflict were fought in the territories of the feudal town of Bivona and the demesne town of Sciacca, both current Italian municipalities in the province of Agrigento in Sicily, in the summer months of 1529.

In addition to Sigismondo II de Luna and Giacomo Perollo, the real protagonists of the conflict, the second Sciacca case involved several personalities, from the relatives of the two enemies to the privateer Sericono Bassà, from Pope Clement VII to Emperor Charles V.

The case finally ended, at the end of February 1530, with the death of Sigismondo de Luna, which occurred more than seven months after that of his enemy Giacomo Perollo.

== Historical context ==
The 16th century in Sicily was characterized by the constant discord among the feudal lords of the island. Being inhabited by several lords, many state-owned cities were bloodied by the struggles caused by the lust for dominance of each lord who, taking advantage especially of the weakness of the government, wanted to impose himself in the cities, flaunting luxury and power.

Sciacca, a port city in southwestern Sicily, was the home of numerous powerful noble families of the time: predominant over all were the Perollo family (a family of French origin, which had acquired a prominent role as early as the 13th century) and the Aragonese De Luna family, which also had possessions in other parts of Sicily (Bivona, Caltabellotta, Caltavuturo, Castellammare del Golfo).

In the early decades of the sixteenth century the Perollo family had become even more powerful through the good offices of Giacomo Perollo, lord of Pandolfina, who boasted a great friendship with Hector Pignatelli, viceroy of Sicily (both of whom were page boys at the court of the King of Spain during their boyhood).

Having been Sciacca's deputy in the Sicilian Parliament several times, he enjoyed a large following, both among the people and numerous patrician families.

Other families, however, resenting the attitudes and riches of the Perollo, plotted against them and pitted the de Luna against him, especially Sigismondo de Luna, "the most powerful of the lords of the area," a son of Giovanni Vincenzo de Luna (baron of Bivona, count of Caltabellotta and Sclafani, stratigotus of Messina, president of the Kingdom and lord of the port of Castellammare del Golfo) and husband of Luisa Salviati, daughter of Jacopo Salviati and Lucrezia de' Medici.

== The casus belli ==
The first confrontation

And, as if he had to prepare himself, not for any conflict, but for a war, he ordered his trusted knight of honor Marco Lucchesi, well known to those of Bivona for his qualities as a strong and valiant knight, to set out for Bivona to recruit the best and bravest of the strong and valiant mountaineers, and to enter with them into Sciacca as if to put it in a state of siege. But those of Perollo, to whom the tendentious moves of De Luna did not escape their notice, soon became aware of them, and without setting any time, in armed ordinance, they ambushed the Bivonese before they had reached Sciacca. And indeed, they ordered a secret ambush, for which, as soon as the Bivonese led by Marco Lucchesi popped up, those of the Perollo suddenly stormed. Quite a few of the Bivonese fell to the first fire, but the others, led by the brave Marco Lucchesi, retreated to provide themselves with a safer position, to avoid enemy shots, and to save their lives. Having found a better defensive position, with intrepid courage they stabbed the Bivonese, thus avenging the affront they received in the first clash; but even so, seven of the Bivonese perished there, and among them the most valiant, Calogero D'Onda, who was very dear to the count, and many others were seriously wounded. After the battle ended, Lucchesi, with all those people who remained with him, took another route to Sciacca, to evade new clashes before receiving the count's authorization.

— Giovan Battista Sedita, Cenno storico-politico-etnografico di Bivona, 1909

The first clash between the two opposing factions occurred when about 30 of Count Luna's bravi, on their way from Bivona to Sciacca, were ambushed by a host of Perollo's armigers.

The bravi of the de Luna, despite being wounded (among them the Bivonese Calogero Unda, "much esteemed by Count Luna"), managed to reach Sciacca to reinforce the number of the Aragonese family's armigers; their large numbers caused the Perollo to request mediation between the two lords, Giacomo Perollo and Sigismondo de Luna, from the archpriest of Sciacca Don Gabriele Salvo.

Peace was promised, but such a pact was in vain, since, not long afterwards, an episode triggered a real war between the two: after an attempt by Sigismondo failed, Giacomo Perollo succeeded in freeing, without ransom, the baron of Solunto, kidnapped earlier by the Barbary pirate Sinam Bassà (called Sericono or also "the Jew"), as well as ten other Christians.

The checkmate suffered by Sigismondo further worsened the relationship between the two lords; increasing Sigismondo's resentment, moreover, were above all the constant demonstrations of force and contemptuous attitudes ("even to the point of mocking him and calling him mad") of Giacomo Perollo toward him.

== Stages of the conflict ==
=== Early stages ===
The early stages of the conflict were characterized by constant murder and intimidation: Giovanni Vincenzo de Luna tried in vain to kill Giacomo Perollo; Girolamo Ferraro, a nobleman who had spoken words of peace before Sigismondo de Luna, was killed; some of Count de Luna's servants were clubbed; a bravo of Perollo's, Cola Stornello, was found dead (killed because "he had said before the de Luna house that his sword cut gold and silk.") a Bivonese man, whose name is known only (Matteo) wounded the archpriest of Sciacca Don Salvo because he was believed to be a partisan of Giacomo Perollo; Francesco Sanetta, captain of justice of Sciacca, broke into Sigismondo's house, along with some of the Perollo's braves, to search for armigers of the enemy.

A meeting held in Caltabellotta on 18 June 1529 (in which, most likely, Giovanni Vincenzo de Luna also participated) decreed the turning point of the conflict: Sigismondo "decided to shorten the time for the decisive clash" and arranged for all his supporters to gather in Bivona to join him, later, precisely in Caltabellotta.

=== The first clash at Sciacca ===
On the night of 19 June 1529, one hundred armed men of the de Luna family, "ready to act at the most opportune moment," sneaked into Sciacca. A few days later a clash took place between the two opposing sides: two armigers of Perollo lost their lives on the occasion, which revealed the presence of a large number of followers of Sigismondo de Luna.

Therefore, Perollo had his friend Ettore Pignatelli, viceroy of Sicily, intervene directly: the latter sent Geronimo Statella, baron of Mongerbino, escorted by a company of infantrymen to Sciacca.

The commander Statella, in his capacity as captain of justice, had some time before captured in Bivona Bastiano Napoli, bravo of Giovanni Vincenzo de Luna, and despite the protests of the count (who as a result of this episode "believed his rights of mero et mixto imperio had been infringed") had him hanged in the village, causing the protests and threats of the people who forced him to flee away from Bivona.

Statella arrived in Sciacca on 14 July: he banished some members of the Amato, Fontanetta and Lucchesi families, friends of the de Luna, from the town; he condemned other men who were enemies of the Perollo to death; and finally, he ordered Sigismondo de Luna to move away from Sciacca and disband his troops (which amounted to about 400 infantrymen and 300 cavalrymen).

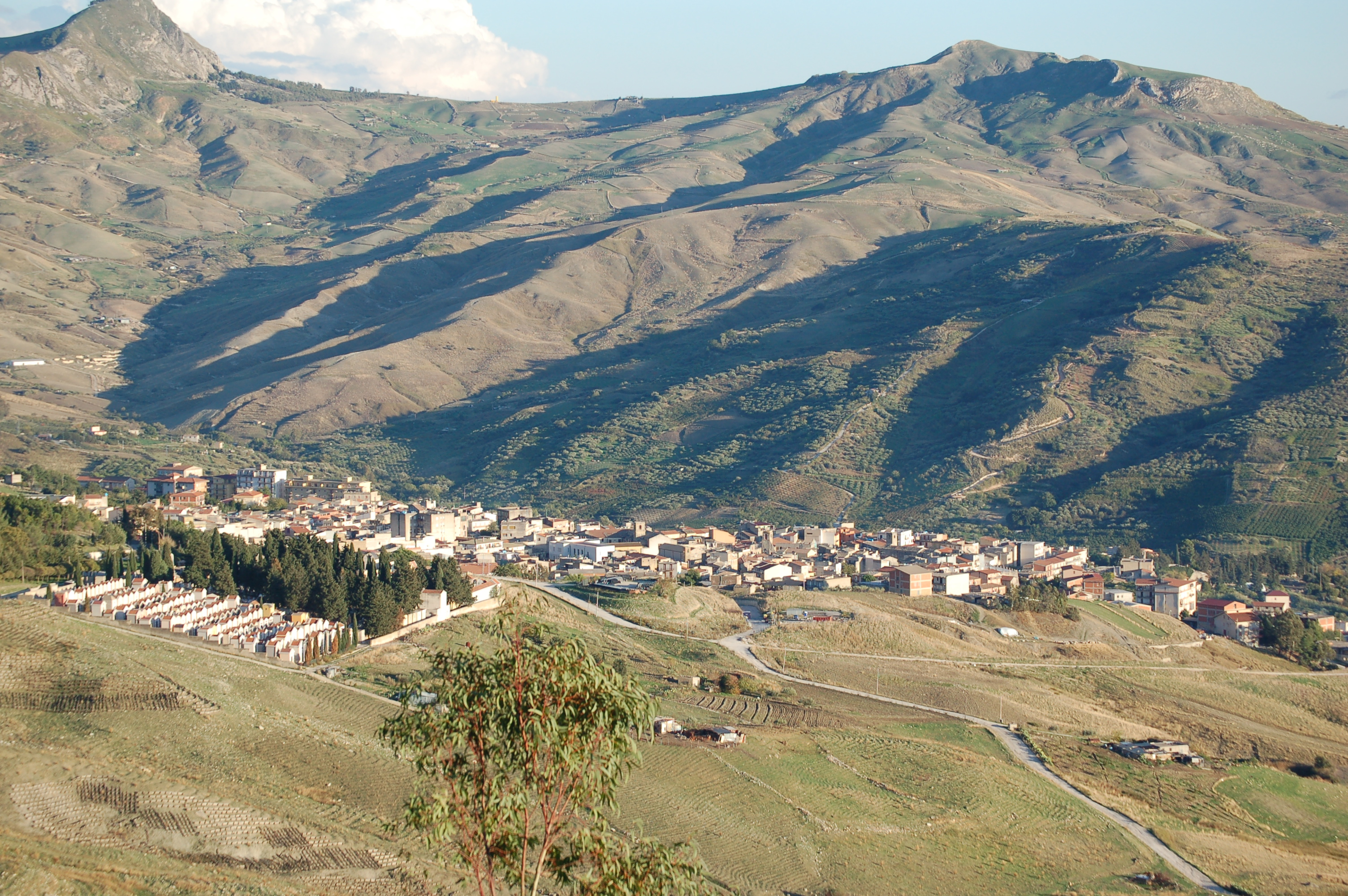
Panorama of Bivona: in the center of the image (outside the town), Cozzu di li furchi

=== Girolamo Statella in Bivona ===
On his return trip to Messina, Girolamo Statella passed through Bivona on 16 July 1529: there he had twenty of Count de Luna's braves hanged, including Giorgio Grasta. The hanging was followed by an insurrection of the people of Bivona, and once again Statella was forced to flee the mountain town and head back to Sciacca. The following is a description of the episode taken from the work Cenno storico-politico-etnografico di Bivona by Giovan Battista Sedita, dated 1909:

Thereafter Statella passed through Bivona, where the first that came into his hands was Giorgio Grasta, leader of a squadron and much protected by the Count, and with Grasta another 19 men.
Having these in his hands, on the same day, July 16, he had them publicly hanged on gallows specially erected on a hill a few steps from the town (the ever-remembered Cozzu di li furchi). Wanting then to perform with many others the same thing, he was unsuccessful, for the Bivonese mutinied, and taking up arms, forced the harsh captain to return to Sciacca whence he had come.

=== The massacre of Sciacca ===
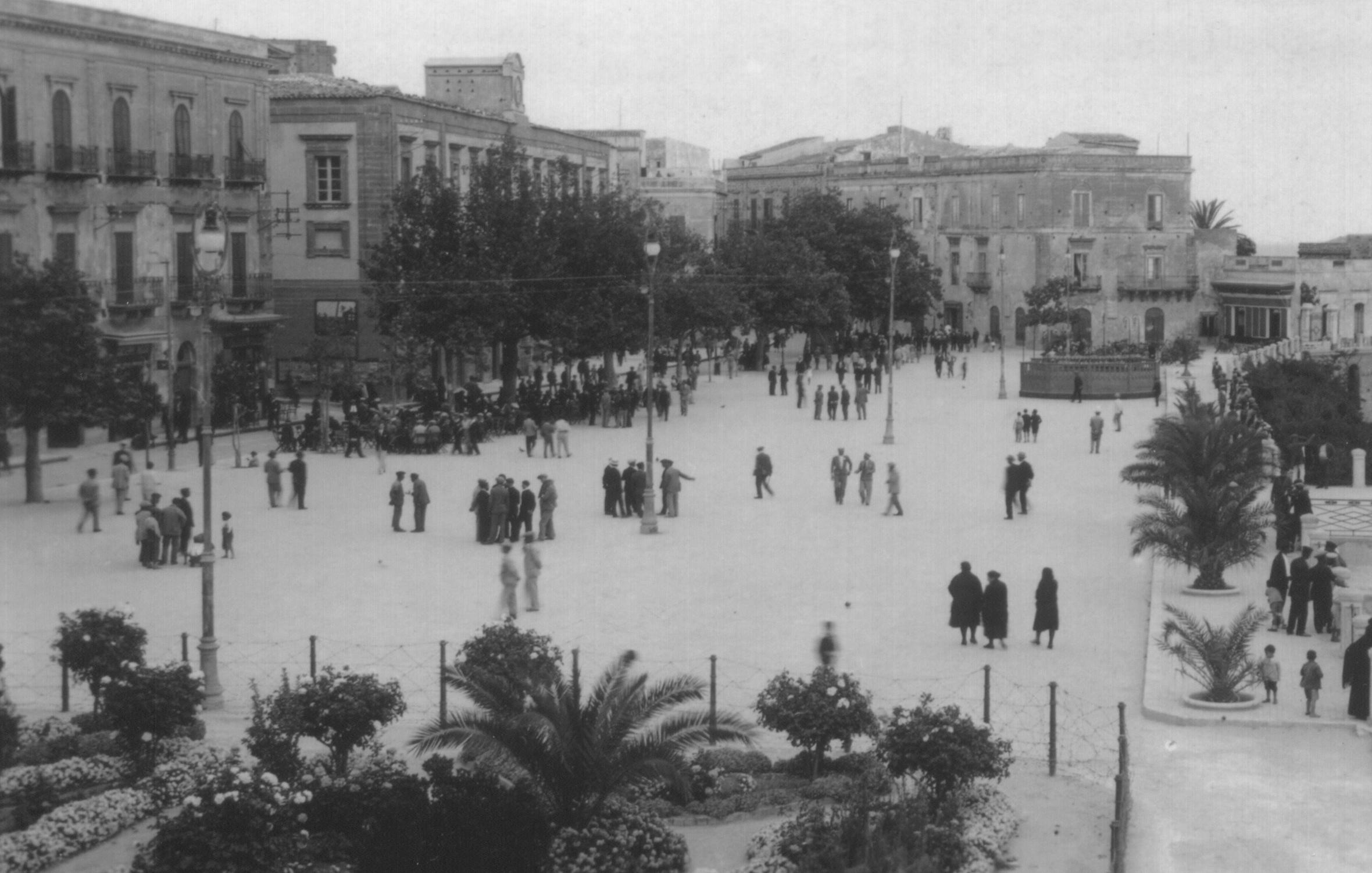
Historical image of Sciacca, a state city besieged during the conflict

Moving away from Sciacca, Sigismondo settled with his small army in the Verdura fief, near the mouth of the river of the same name, about ten miles east of the port city. Statella again ordered him to disband the troops, by Sunday, 22 July 1529: otherwise, Sigismondo would incur the crime of lese-majesty. Fearing an enemy attack, Giacomo Perollo sent his son Federico to Messina, to Viceroy Pignatelli; Federico Perollo left with sixty knights to ask for more reinforcements, but de Luna attacked sooner than expected.

On the evening of 19 July, Sigismondo and his men stealthily entered Sciacca; at dawn, once Perollo's and Statella's houses were surrounded, de Luna ordered the attack. Girolamo Statella was killed by the Albanian Giorgio Comito, head of a squadron in Sigismondo's service: Comito, "chief of the Greeks" (the Arbëreshë of Sicily), carried out a personal revenge:

And finally Statella was killed with a blow of a rapier to the heart by that Comito whom Statella a few days before wanted delivered by the Count to his hands. Then they threw the body of Baron Statella from the top of the tower, and when his skull hit the stones and was crushed, his brain came out, which was then picked up and buried by a certain Marco Rappa.

Giacomo Perollo enclosed himself within the walls of his castle (the so-called "old castle," which has now practically disappeared), together with his men: Sigismondo, therefore, ordered an assault on the castle. On 20 July, the building was attacked four times, but all attempts were in vain. The bodies of the "most valiant" warriors and those of the nobles were taken to Bivona, as ordered by de Luna.

Perollo was also able to defend itself the following day, 21 July, in which several assailants lost their lives, including the Bivonese Antonio Di Noto, "a very valiant young man and held in high esteem by De Luna," and the Trapanese Giovanni Lipari, "a man of incredible valor." The warriors were also taken to Bivona.

On 22 July 1529 Sigismondo de Luna ordered the demolition of the castle gates: on this occasion he had eight pieces of artillery used, forming part of the defensive system of the city of Sciacca:

[...] with the strength of oxen he made them take them to the road opposite the so strong and impregnable castle of Baron Perollo. And so the Count's men, armed with cannons, began to knock down the tower, which immediately showed signs of giving way and shattering. Perollo, seeing the desperate situation, ordered the flag to be hoisted on the battlements of the tower as a sign of peace.

Sigismondo de Luna would accept the peace proposal made by the enemy only if he "came before him, kneeling, to beg forgiveness and kiss his foot." Due to the harshness of Count Luna's proposal, Giacomo Perollo refused, and the assault was also renewed the following day.

=== Perollo's death ===
The killing of Giacomo Perollo

[...] Calandrini [...] immediately ran to where Giacomo was: Onofrio Imbeagna and many other of the Count's most important friends joined him; and [...] first the aforementioned Calandrini, and then all the others, gave him many blows from behind; they did not leave him wounded until they had finished killing him, when Giacomo fell dead [...]. ...] They then inflicted on the dead body all those cruelties which would perhaps have made the barbarity of the most cruel tyrants blush, for many [...] drank his blood, and others tore off his flesh with their teeth. Thus, Giacomo Perollo, Baron of Pandolfina, and royal portolan of the city of Sciacca, most clear for the splendour of his ancestors and for his glorious deeds, ended his life on Monday 23 July at 10 pm in the year 1529.

— Francesco Savasta, Il famoso Caso di Sciacca, 1726

On 23 July 1529, Sigismondo de Luna's men managed to break down the tower and gate of San Pietro, entering Perollo's castle and killing everyone they came across.

Giacomo Perollo managed to escape and hide in a private house (owned by a certain Luca Parisi): betrayed by one of his followers, Antonello Palermo (to whom Sigismondo had promised "all the large sum that the baron had brought"), Perollo was discovered and killed by Calogero Calandrino.

However, Sigismondo de Luna was not satisfied with his enemy's death:

[...] Count Luna, who had the corpse in his hands, barbarously and cowardly had it tied to the tail of a horse and rode it through the streets of the city, both as a trophy and to frighten the citizens of the whole city, who had unconditionally surrendered to him out of fear. He also plundered the other houses of all the Perollo and most of their followers, making a massacre of all those who fell into the hands of such an enraged beast and his people.

News of the baron's killing, "preceded and followed by so many excesses, so much slaughter and carnage," reached Perollo's friends and Federico (Giacomo's son), who learned what had happened along the road from Messina to Sciacca). The latter, who was together with a contingent of troops that the viceroy had entrusted to him, warned his friend Pignatelli of the "very serious events that had taken place," and, aggregating some armed men sent to him by the marquis of Geraci between Caltanissetta and Polizzi, on 29 July 1529, he set out for Sciacca, vowing to "kill De Luna and tear his heart out of his chest."

=== Battle of Blood Valley ===
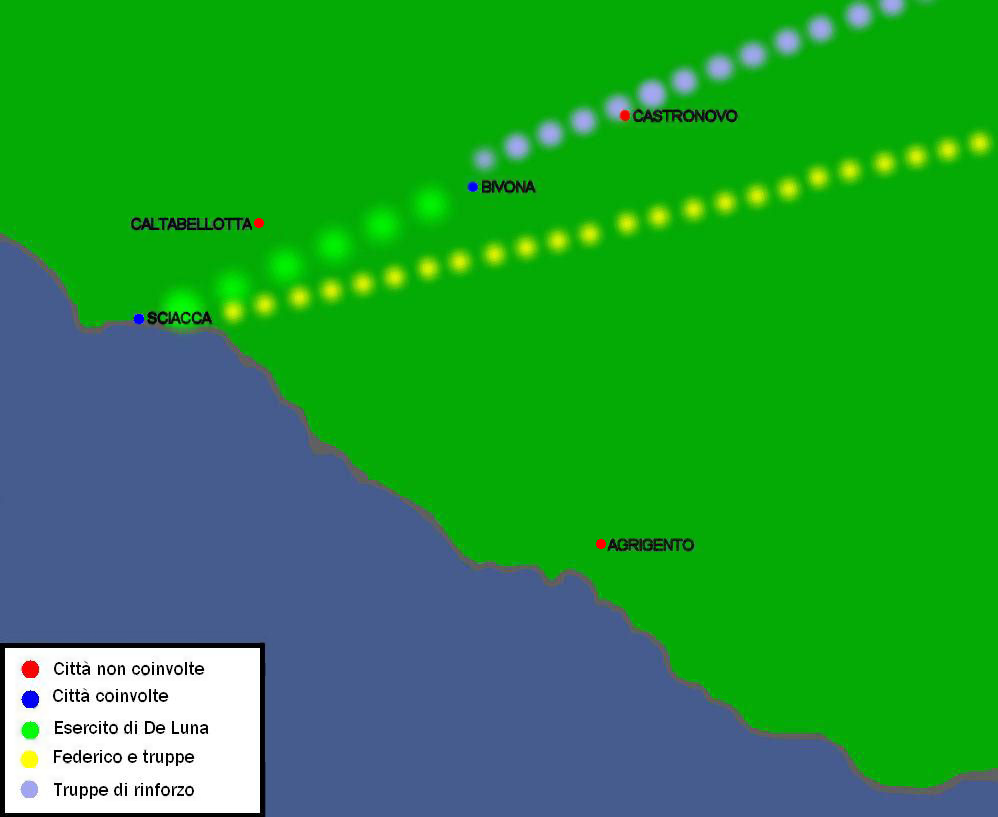
Battle of Blood Valley, fought between Bivona and Castronovo di Sicilia

Sigismondo de Luna, knowing the moves of his adversaries with the help of his own secret spies, "fearing that he could not cope with the royal army," retreated with all his men (more than 1,000 men, of whom as many as 130 were wounded) to Bivona, "his city, which would perhaps have known how to appreciate the many excesses, to which he had indulged."

Between Sciacca and Bivona, having reached the Verdura River, Onofrio Imbeagna, one of Perollo's killers, who had already been seriously wounded during the assault, died.

Count Luna arrived in Bivona on 1 August and had the defenses of the castle and town fortified: he had trenches made, forts, parapets and moats prepared.

On 2 August, Federico Perollo and his army arrived in Sciacca, finding, however, no enemy. The baron waited, therefore, for the arrival of reinforcements sent from Messina by Viceroy Pignatelli; but the royal troop, captained by the two ministers of justice Nicolò Pollastra and Giovanni Riganti (judges of the Grand Criminal Court, who received full powers from the viceroy), having to pass through Bivona before reaching Sciacca, after passing Castronovo, ran into Count Luna's army:

It was at dawn on the 11th of August 1529, when the royal army had arrived in the ancient fief of Leone, a place between Castronovo and Bivona, that the leaders of this army marched forward with 100 men on horseback, both to inspect the roads and to discover the progress of the enemy, who was not unlikely, as he was, to lie in wait in those quarters belonging to the enemy. But when they had reached a distance of a little more than 2 miles, and were in the very gorge that now bears the name of the Valley of Blood, they suddenly found themselves surrounded and under attack.

Of the 100 horsemen sent ahead by the two ministers of justice, thirty were killed, others were mortally wounded, and others ran to warn the rest of the army, which was stationed in the Leone fiefdom, present-day territory near Filaga, a hamlet of Prizzi.

Learning of what had happened, Pollastra and Riganti decided to reach Sciacca "by another route": as soon as they arrived there, they formed an army of 1,000 infantrymen and 1,000 cavalrymen (including Frederick Perollo's warriors) and set out for Bivona.

Informed of his opponents' intentions, Sigismondo de Luna, aware of the enemy's strength, resolved to flee.

=== The siege of Bivona ===
When the army arrived in the area of Bivona on the same day, 13 August, it was divided into three squadrons before entering the land: one of 600 horses was placed under the command of Gian Paolo, who was very skilled in military exercises; another of 400 horses was placed under the command of a brave Spanish commander; and another of a thousand infantrymen was led by these judges. They therefore advanced in an orderly fashion to Bivona, and having arrived there, surrounded the whole country and the castle outside, which they began to attack from two sides.

— Francesco Savasta, Il famoso Caso di Sciacca, 1726

Arriving in Bivona on 13 August 1529, the royal troops were divided into three squadrons: it was Gian Paolo Perollo, Giacomo's nephew and the leader of a force of 600 horsemen, "the first to advance with the retinue of his men into the same land, where he immediately had all those shelters that the count had installed dismantled."

Entering de Luna's residence inside the castle and noticing the absence of Sigismondo and his relatives, he knocked down the gates; then, "climbing up over the top of the tower, killing all those who stood before him, he raised the flags with the arms of the Emperor.

The soldiers who were storming the other side of the castle, seeing the flag with the imperial insignia on the tower, gathered with the rest of the troops stationed around the town; together with the royal ministers, having made sure that the town was under the control of their own militia, they entered Bivona:

Federico Perollo, who had entered the castle with Gian Paolo, immediately appeared on one of its balconies, and then, accompanied by many nobles and a troop of his most valiant men, set out to search all the chambers and all the innermost places of the said castle to find the Count: but all was in vain. Soon they heard from many that their great enemy, whom they so longed to have in their hands, had already fled. This news made them very angry, and they raged against the accomplices and followers of Sigismondo.

The royal ministers exercised "acts of strict justice": they hanged numerous inhabitants of Bivona in the main square of the town and in different "parts of the land"; others were quartered ("and then the quarters were hung on the walls of the houses, leaving in the streets flooded with blood the severed heads of the executed."), driven into exile, placed in prisons, stripped "of their belongings."

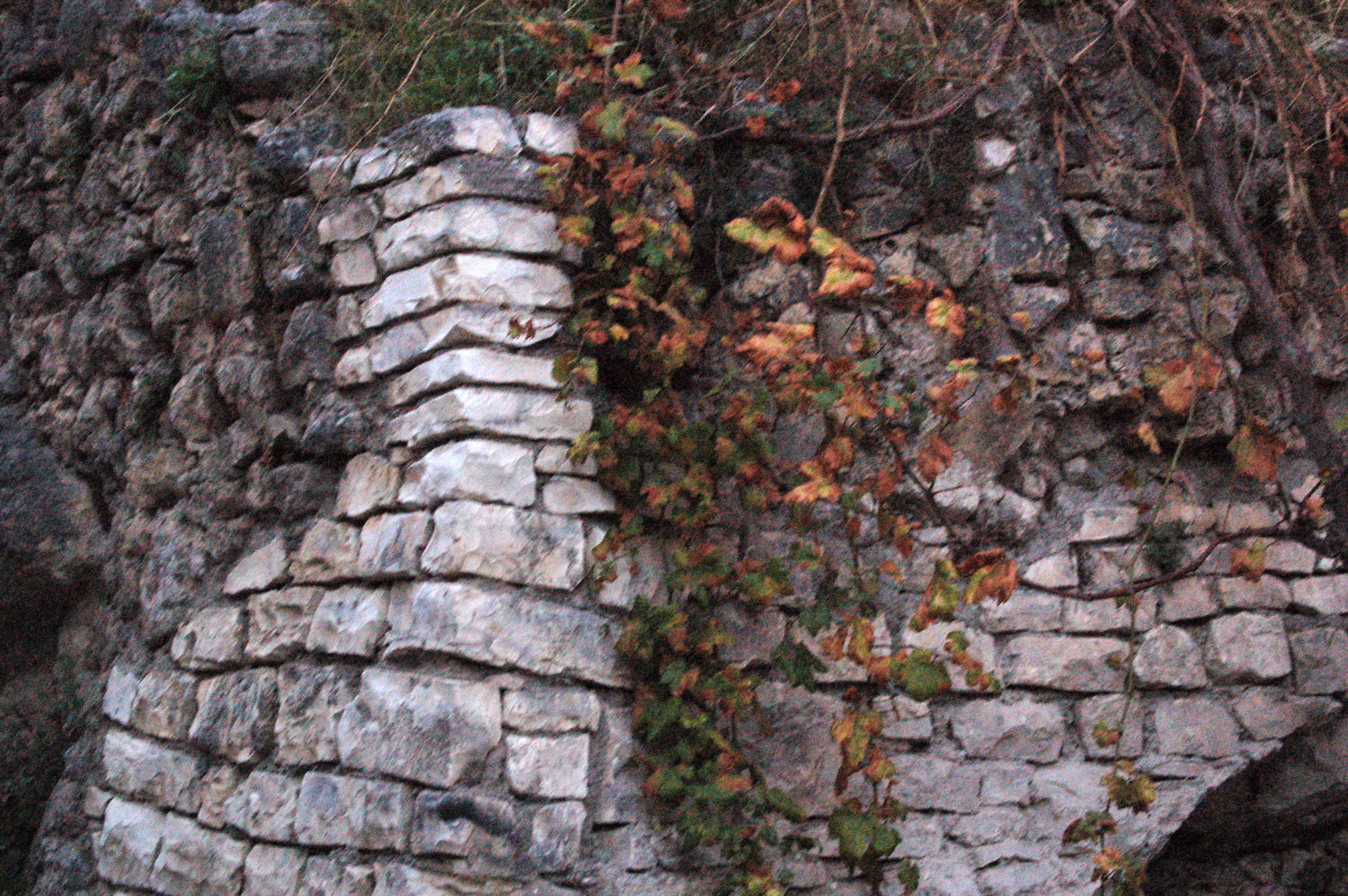
The ruins of the castle of Bivona, destroyed during the sacking

=== The sacking of the Bivona castle ===
After raging against the people of Bivona, in the hope that someone would "give him De Luna into his hands, or at least let him know where he was locked up," Federico Perollo had the castle of Bivona sacked, stripping the building and the town of all their wealth:

[...] then they had the castle stripped of its precious furniture and noble utensils, and with all the other furniture that was in it, they handed everything over to the royal treasury. Oh, what lamentations were heard everywhere in that wretched land, which was so closely guarded on all sides, that it was a very lamentable affair to see that many of the Bivonese wished to save themselves by fleeing, but because of the guards that surrounded the said land, they could not get out; whereupon they were compelled to remain, and to sacrifice their lives to the avenging iron of severe justice. After the Perollos, together with the royal ministers, had taken these steps in Bivona, they finally sacked it, and, seeing that they had nothing else to do, since they could not have Sigismondo in their hands, they decided to go to Sciacca to punish the criminals.

On 17 August 1529 they returned to Sciacca, with "their swords and shields still stained with the blood of their enemies."

=== The return to Sciacca ===
Returning to Sciacca (17 Aug.), Ministers Pollastra and Riganti, in a ruling on 13 September 1529, declared Sigismondo de Luna and his men "guilty of the crime of felony and lese-majesty"; despite their contumacy, Sigismondo and his men were sentenced to death and had their property confiscated.

The judges of the grand criminal court arrested numerous nobles and plebeians belonging to the de Luna faction and executed them; they issued throughout the kingdom notices of arrest against all those who had served Sigismondo; they sent to Messina, to the viceroy, some jurors from Sciacca accused of connivance with the de Luna family.

Not even the city of Sciacca was exempt from the severe punishment administered by the two ministers: it was condemned to pay a large sum of money "for not having given aid to the captain of arms Girolamo Statella"; later, the sentence was remitted by Viceroy Pignatelli. Below is Savasta's detailed description:

[...] two of them, Filippo Montaliana and Giovanni Maurici, were sent to prison in a castle in the city of Messina, where they languished and suffered for three years, and then died miserably. The other two, Baldassare Tagliavia and Pietro Lorefice, as well as many other nobles, had their heads cut off by the hands of executioners in the public squares, and a great number of plebeians, who were all on the side of this rebellious insurrection, were hanged on the gallows. Many other nobles that they could get their hands on, and among them Girola, Peralta, Baron of S. Giacomo, Bartolomeo Tagliavia, and Michele Impugiades, and others, who, with the confidence of striking a blow, had joined in the conspiracy against Perollo, were held in the bosom of a dark prison for the rest of their lives. They also exiled many hundreds of men, including all those who belonged to the Lucchesi family to the third degree. Also exiled were Clemente lo Piparo, Giovanni Amato and Giovanni Vallelajo, who took part in the sacking of the castle [...].

On 4 October 1529 the royal ministers Pollastra and Riganti, after spending forty-nine days in Bivona and Sciacca, decided to return to Messina. On the morning of the following day (5 October) the two left accompanied by Federico Perollo and his brother Friar Domenico: Perollo's purpose was to personally thank the viceroy of Sicily Ettore Pignatelli. On 15 October the various troops who rushed to Perollo's aid, offered by the marquis of Geraci and the princes of Castelvetrano and Partanna, were dismissed.

=== Sigismondo in Rome ===
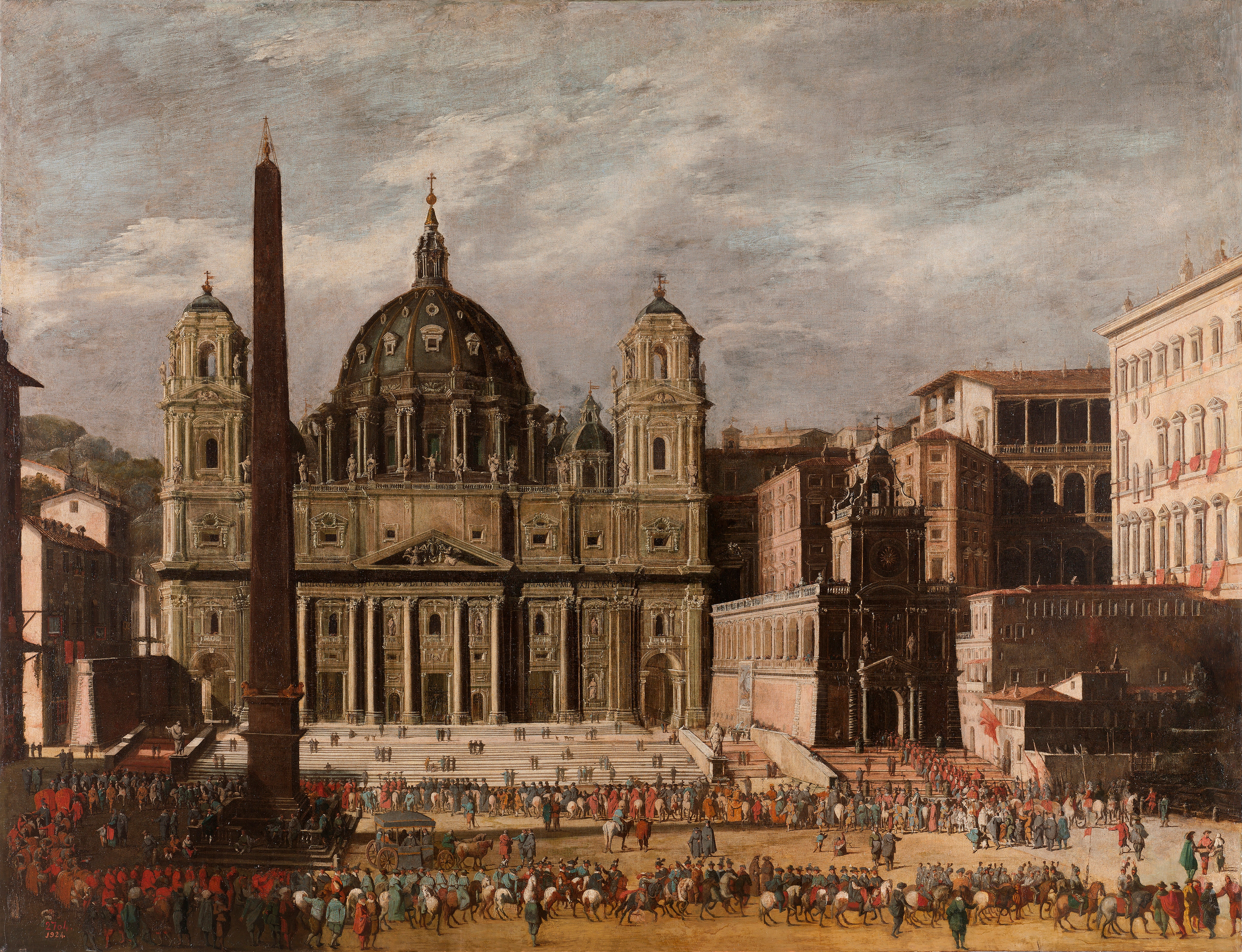
St. Peter's Basilica in an ancient painting

Leaving Sicily on 13 August, after "a long and disastrous journey," Sigismondo de Luna reached Civitavecchia; from there, he made his way to Rome. Count Luna fled Bivona with his wife, three sons and his most trusted men, taking with him all that he could gather of his wealth before his flight:

[...] Arrived at Verdura, he found the usual ship ready, which he kept there permanently, and in broad daylight, on the 13th of August 1529, he embarked for Civitavecchia, from whence he went to Rome, thus exposing, that traitor, so many poor people to the fury and vengeance of the terrible enemies. In this De Luna was fortunate, for at the same time that the ship set sail from the beach of Verdura, the royal army was passing through that fiefdom on its way to Bivona, but they took no notice of it, far from suspecting that De Luna could be found in those woods.

In Rome Sigismondo sought the protection and assistance of Pope Clement VII, his cousin-in-law. His wife Luisa Salviati was the daughter of Lucrezia de' Medici (daughter of Lorenzo the Magnificent and great-granddaughter of Cosimo the elder), niece of Pope Leo X (who in 1520 favored the marriage between Sigismondo and Luisa, which took place three years later) and cousin of Pope Clement VII.

=== Charles V and Clement VII ===
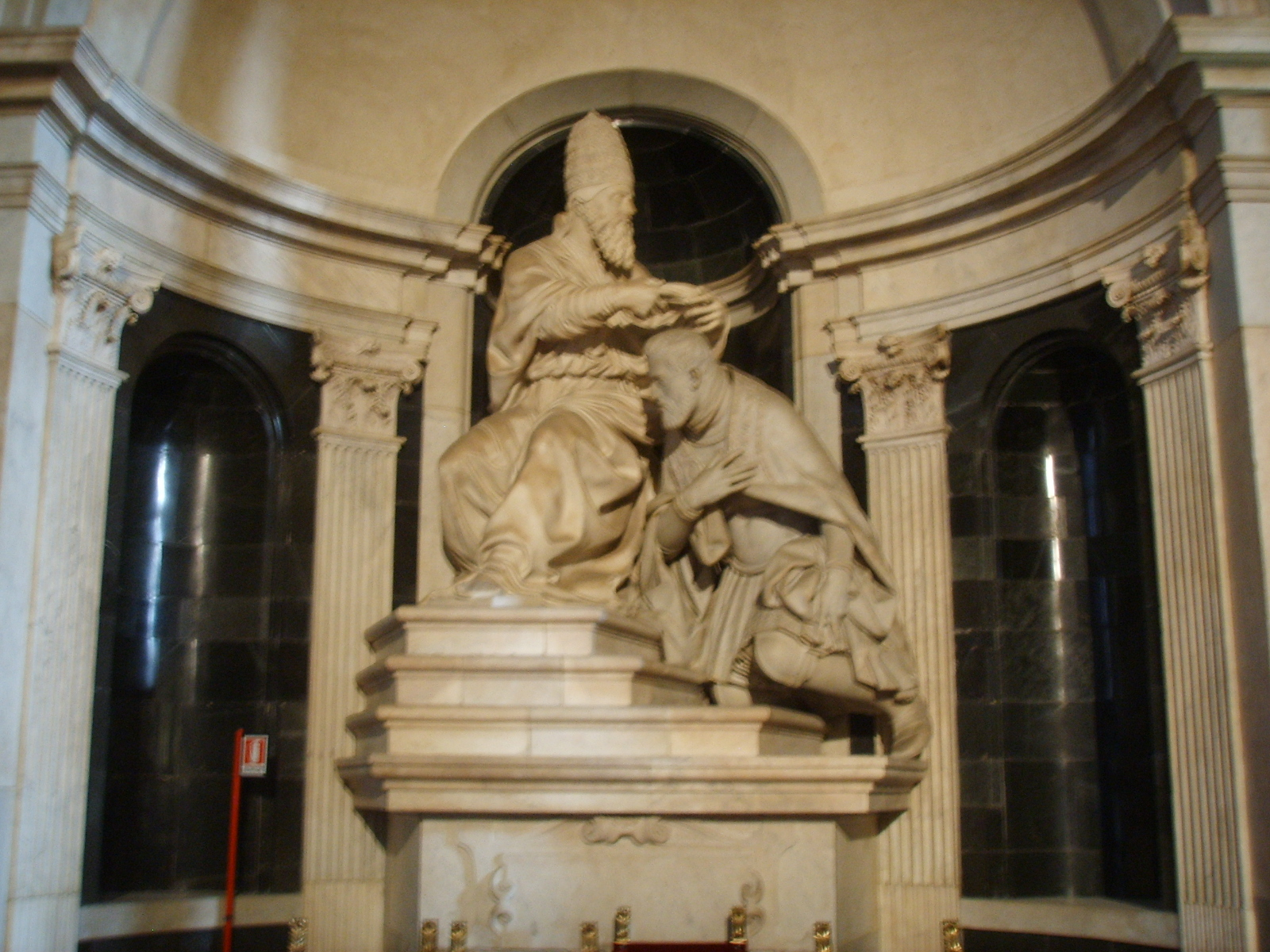
Clement VII crowns Charles V, Baccio Bandinelli, Hall of the five hundred, Palazzo Vecchio, Florence

[...] Count Sigismondo was afraid to appear before the Supreme Pontiff, Clement VII, his uncle, because of the horror of the abominable excesses he had committed: nevertheless, encouraged by the countess, his wife, he went with her before the Vicar of Christ and knelt at his feet: and then the lamentations, tears and sobs of the count and the countess were so many that they pitied the inmost parts of Clement. The latter, overwhelmed by so much tenderness, promised him, after bitterly denouncing Sigismondo, that he would ask the benevolent greatness of the Emperor Charles V for a pardon for his release, although he would then be crowned, which would be in a few months' time. The anguished Count breathed a sigh of relief at the Pope's promise, and, comforted by this hope, he began to attend with pleasure the congresses of the nobles of that great city which is the head of the world.

— Francesco Savasta, Il famoso Caso di Sciacca, 1726

Sigismondo de Luna's aim was to obtain the pardon and grace of Charles V through the papal authority of Clement VII. A few months ago, the Treaty of Barcelona had been concluded between Clement VII and Charles V (29 June 1529), at the conclusion of the war pitting the Habsburgs against the League of Cognac: under this agreement, Charles V would be crowned emperor by the pontiff himself.

Considering the seriousness of the actions committed by his nephew, Clement VII resolved to wait for a propitious opportunity to hope for a favorable response from Charles V; in the meantime, Sigismondo de Luna began to frequent noble circles in Rome.

The opportunity presented itself on 24 February 1530, the day on which the Pope was to crown the Emperor in Bologna:

[...] in the Archiepiscopal Church of Bologna, [...] the Emperor and the Pope were seated together on the same throne, and at the very moment when he was about to crown him, he interrupted the service and interposed his most fervent prayers to obtain mercy for Count Sigismondo Luna, his nephew. When he heard the Emperor utter the hated name of Sigismondo Luna, his heart was filled with indignation, and his eyes burned like two coals of fire. Then, overcome with rage, he closed his mouth at the answer, and, thinking of the most atrocious case, of which he was well informed, he was for a time horrified, unable to utter a word. Then he drew in his breath, turned to the Pope, told him briefly what had happened, and then, in a grave and stern tone, before the Consistory of Cardinals and in the presence of the whole world, absolutely refused the Supreme Vicar of Christ the grace of pardon for Count Sigismondo Luna.

The Pontiff did not want to reply to the Emperor and went on with the coronation; he left again for Rome with a "distressed mood."

Two days later, the Pope again came to Charles to ask him for a pardon "with humbler and more fervent supplications." The Emperor, recognizing the greatness of Clement VII, "the first among the Emperors, and kings of the world," granted the pardon to Giovanni Vincenzo de Luna, Sigismondo's father, to Luisa Salviati and to Pietro, Giulio and Giacomo (Sigismondo's wife and children). Sigismondo, however, remained "with no more hope of pardon." Charles V even decreed that "by the hand of an executioner his head should be cut off on a stage so that an eternal infamy to his name may be left.".

=== The suicide of Sigismondo de Luna ===
Arriving back in Rome, Pope Clement VII informed his nephews of Charles V's decision. Sigismondo de Luna, who had been anxiously awaiting news of the possible pardon he had received through the help of his uncle the pontiff, as soon as he heard of the imperial decree pronounced against himself, "became dismayed in a manner, that he became all cold, and half dead."

Having lost all hope and in the grip of regret and despair, Sigismund, "furious and maddened," ran hastily through the streets of Rome; finally, he reached the Tiber and threw himself into it, dying drowned.

The news of his death shook the entire family:

The news of Sigismondo's desperate death filled all Rome, and indeed the whole world, with horror; and when the Pope heard of it, he wept with sorrow for his nephew's misfortune. Immediately he went to console the most distressed Countess, who, at this grim news, mourned bitterly for the loss of her beloved husband. Such, in short, was the end of Count D. Sigismondo Luna.

With the death of de Luna, there was a definitive end to the second case of Sciacca, which saw the death of the two protagonists of the conflict, Sigismondo II de Luna and Giacomo Perollo.

== Consequences ==
[...] Sigismondo, [...] who caused so many tears and so much blood to be shed by the two sisters "Sciacca and Bivona," who, before and after him, always had very cordial relations.

— Giovan Battista Sedita, Cenno storico-politico-etnografico di Bivona, 1909

=== The "deplorable state" of the city of Sciacca ===
At the end of the conflict, the state city of Sciacca remained in a "very deplorable state, feeling among all the cities of the kingdom the most vivid pain of its wounds, and the most sensitive bitterness of its miseries. For it remained depopulated in the multitude of its inhabitants, destroyed in the magnificence of its buildings, and impoverished in the abundance of its wealth."

The population went from about 25,000 inhabitants in 1328 (under Frederick III) to about 35,000 in 1459, to just 12,000 in the period following the civil war between the Luna and Perollo families. For this reason, the people of Sciacca sang:

Casu di Sciacca, spina di stu cori

di quantu larmi m’ha fattu ettari!
Iddi si lazzariaru comu cani

di Sciacca ‘un ni rimasi ca lu nomu!
Case of Sciacca, thorn in this heart!

How many tears it has made me shed!
They fought like dogs

All that remains of Sciacca is its name!

— Sciacca folk song

In 1575, as a result of the plague that occurred in Sicily on 23 May (caused by a ship from the East), the town of Sciacca lost 5,000 people, reaching about 7,000 in January 1576, when the contagion ceased. The plague struck again in Sciacca in 1625 (28 Oct.), the disease being "brought from the city of Palermo by a certain Ragamazzo, a native of Sciacca." In the month of January 1629 "the said evil was seen to rage with full force." In the month of August another 5,000 people died.

Thus, in 1716, during the reign of Vittorio Amodeo in Sicily, when the numbering of the souls of all the cities and lands of the kingdom had been made, it was found that in Sciacca alone there were about nine thousand.

— Francesco Savasta, Closing sentence of Il famoso Caso di Sciacca, 1726

=== The feudal properties of the de Luna family ===
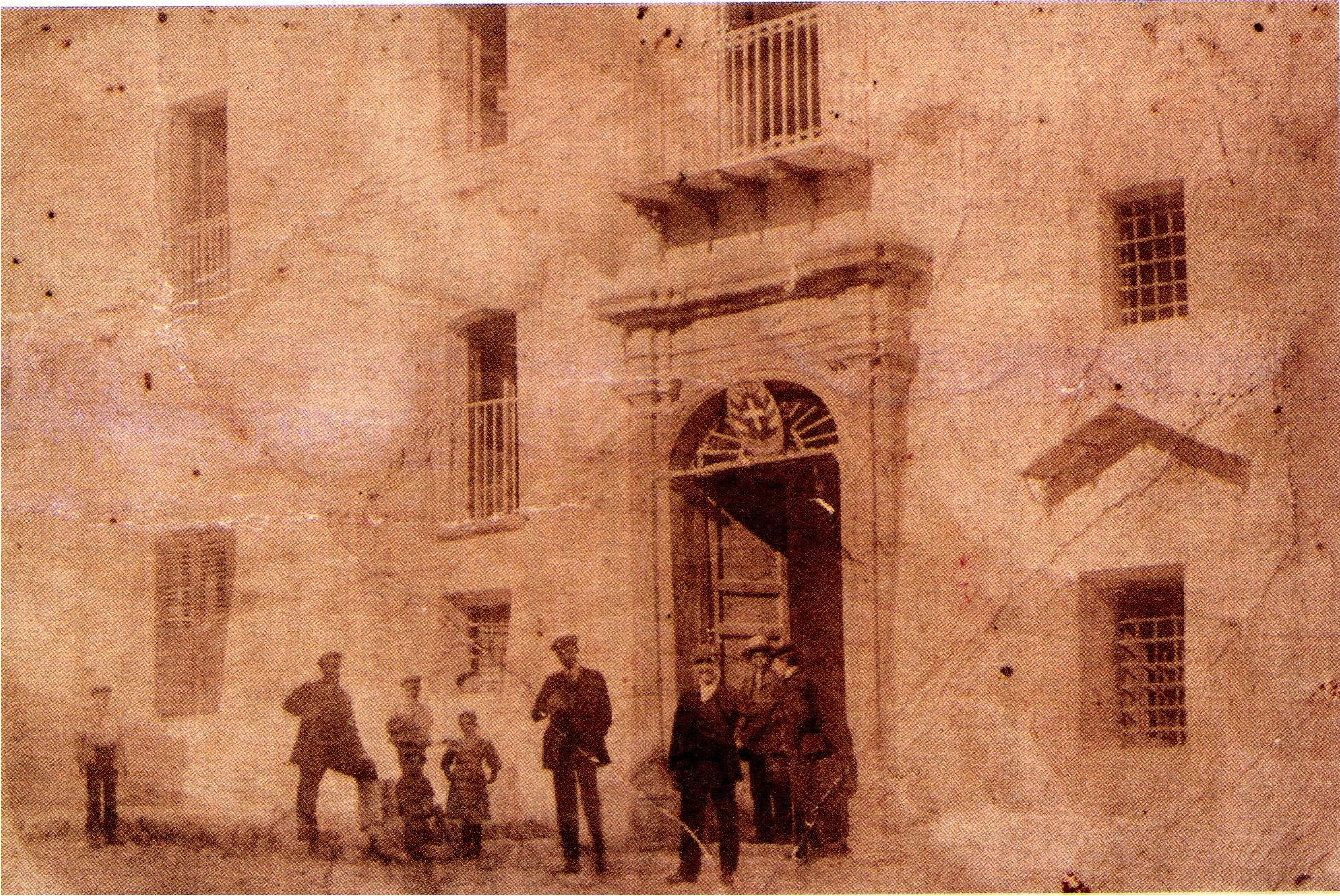
The ducal palace of Bivona, residence of Pietro de Luna

Let it never be, Most Blessed Father, that the mercy of a sovereign should be reduced to the impulses of sense: but it is necessary that reason should have its dominion, when the prayers of those who intercede are in fact absolute commands and can be executed without violating the right of justice. Return, therefore, the three innocent children conceived by Lucrezia Medici, your niece, to my immaculate grace; as also D. Giovanni Luna, their ancestor, as an old man and innocent still of the crime of his son, restoring them to the ancestral and paternal Contado, with the condition, however, that they be paid all the interest suffered by the House of Perollo, as much for the sacking done to the castle, and to the other palaces of the Perolli, as for the ruin of the same castle, and for the burning of the same palaces: and in case they do not respect the Perollo family in the future, they will have to suffer the confiscation of their property again. And I declare to leave Sigismondo in my misfortune [...].

— Francesco Savasta, Dialogue between Charles V and Clement VII in Il famoso Caso di Sciacca, 1726

Due to the intercession of Pope Clement VII, Emperor Charles V reinstated the paternal states (county of Caltabellotta, county of Sclafani, barony of Bivona) to Sigismondo de Luna's sons, who were nevertheless forced to pay all the damages suffered by the Perollo and their men.

Giovanni Vincenzo de Luna, on the other hand, was investigated because he was accused of having authorized the undertaking of Sigismondo, his son: only later did the viceroy of Sicily, remembering the support he had received on several occasions from Giovanni Vincenzo de Luna, allowed him to be interrogated at home by "a young and inexperienced master notary." He was then interrogated by the viceroy. The de Luna received only a light sentence, "less for complicity than for help given to the offenders after the events."

Giovanni Vincenzo's feudal property, which had been confiscated, was returned only a few years later, probably after Charles V granted an indult to Sigismondo's sons (5 December 1533).

According to these provisions, enforced in Sicily on 12 March 1534, Giovanni Vincenzo de Luna (curatorio nomine of the three grandsons) was given back the 500 onze of annuity, previously seized by the tax authorities. On 24 February 1536, the Magna Regia Curia decreed the amount that Sigismondo's sons had to pay back to the Perollo family: 11,966.20 onze in damages. The numerous appeals filed by the de Luna family, however, resulted in a settlement (with notary Giacomo Scavuzzo of Palermo) only on 28 June 1549: according to this, Pietro de Luna, son of Sigismondo and new count of Caltabellotta and Sclafani and baron of Bivona following the death of his grandfather Giovanni Vincenzo (which occurred in Bivona in 1547), compensated Brigida Perollo (widowed wife of Giacomo Perollo) and his children by 4. 800 onze, equal to about 24,000 florins.

In 1554, Charles V elevated Bivona to a duchy and a city, and Pietro de Luna was the first Sicilian noble to acquire the title of duke.

=== The end of the de Luna and Perollo families ===
Following the death of Giovanni Vincenzo, Pietro, first duke of Bivona, headed the de Luna family. He returned to Sicily around the mid-1540s, but did not return to Sciacca: he fixed his residence in Palermo. Then invested with the ducal title by Charles V in 1554, he fixed his residence in the ducal palace of Bivona, together with his bride Isabella de Vega, daughter of the viceroy of Sicily Juan de Vega: from her he had three daughters and one son, who died prematurely. On his second marriage to Angela La Cerda, he had a son, Giovanni, who in turn, having had no children from his marriage to Belladama Settimo and Valguarnera, caused the extinction of the de Luna family.

The Perollo family, on the other hand, "did not last so short," but remained "fruitful for more than a century and a half."

Afterwards it gradually disappeared, limited to a few descendants, allowing, with its great wealth, the expansion of many noble families of the kingdom, who, related to the Lords of Perollo, came to possess their property. The Perolli family, however, is still represented by the person of D. Francesco Perollo, a knight of great merit and singular distinction, still today senator for the second time of the city of Palermo, his homeland, enriched with the most precious descendants of two of his spirited male sons of minor age, D. Emmanuele and D. Francesco Perollo. Emmanuele and D. Arcadio, [...] who give great hope to the homeland and to our city of Sciacca, indeed to the whole of our kingdom, to see in them all the glory of their father's virtuous talents and all the greatness of the sublime merits of their great-grandfathers.

== Chronology of events ==
- June 1529: privateer Sericono Bassà arrives in Sciacca; Baron Giacomo Perollo frees the Baron of Solunto, unleashing the wrath of Count Sigismondo de Luna
- 19 June 1529: de Luna's men sneak into Sciacca.
- 14 July 1529: Girolamo Statella, having arrived in Sciacca, orders Sigismondo to leave the city.
- 16 July 1529: Statella has twenty of count de Luna's men hanged in Bivona.
- 19 July 1529: Sigismondo and his men attack Sciacca; Statella is killed by the arbëreshë Giorgio Comito.
- 23 July 1529: death of Giacomo Perollo.
- 1 August 1529: Sigismondo de Luna enters Bivona victorious.
- 11 August 1529: battle of Blood Valley between royal and de Luna troops.
- 13 August 1529: Sigismondo de Luna sets sail from the mouth of the Verdura River for Rome; Bivona is sacked by Perollo's men.
- 17 August 1529: royal ministers Pollastra and Riganti return to Sciacca.
- 5 October 1529: Federico Perollo and the royal ministers depart again for Messina.
- 24 February 1530: Coronation of Charles V in Bologna.
- 26 or 27 Feb 1530: after Charles V refuses him a pardon, Sigismondo de Luna commits suicide, drowning himself in the Tiber.

== Literature ==
Lu baruni Pirollu è pugnalatu

di centu mani, senza rimissioni.
Veni com’un briganti ammanittatu
pirchì si cci av’a dari lizioni.
Poi veni d’un cavaddu strascinatu
davanti a tutta la popolazioni...
E lu baruni di li granni’mprisi

li strati ‘nsanguiniàu di stu paisi
Baron Perollo was stabbed

by a hundred hands, without mercy.
He was tied up like a bandit
because he deserved a lesson.
Then he was dragged off his horse
in front of all the people....
And the baron, famous for his great deeds

bloodied the streets of this land.

— Vincenzo Licata, 'U caso di Sciacca

The continuous struggles and battles between the de Luna and Perollo families are the main theme of the novel 'U caso di Sciacca, written by Sciacca poet Vincenzo Licata (1906–1996) entirely in Sicilian.

Vincenzo Navarro, a poet from Ribera, also composed a literary work in Sciacca about the conflict between the Luna and Perollo families: it is a tragedy, entitled Giacomo Perollo.

== Maps ==
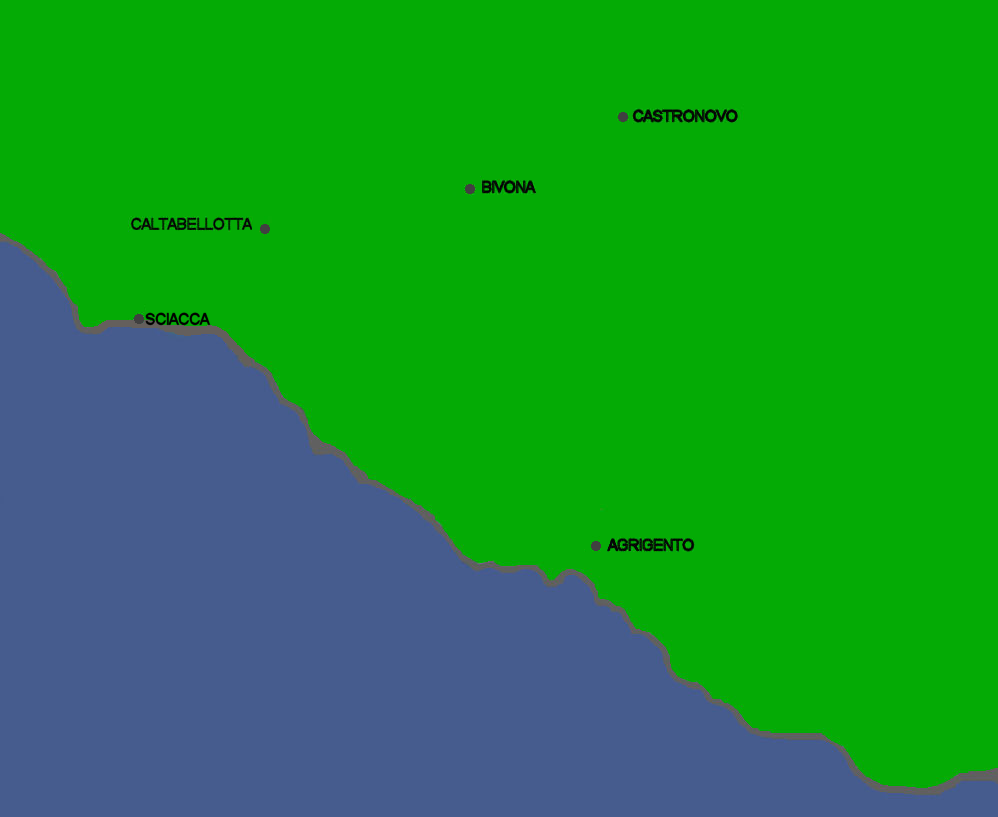
The sites of the clash

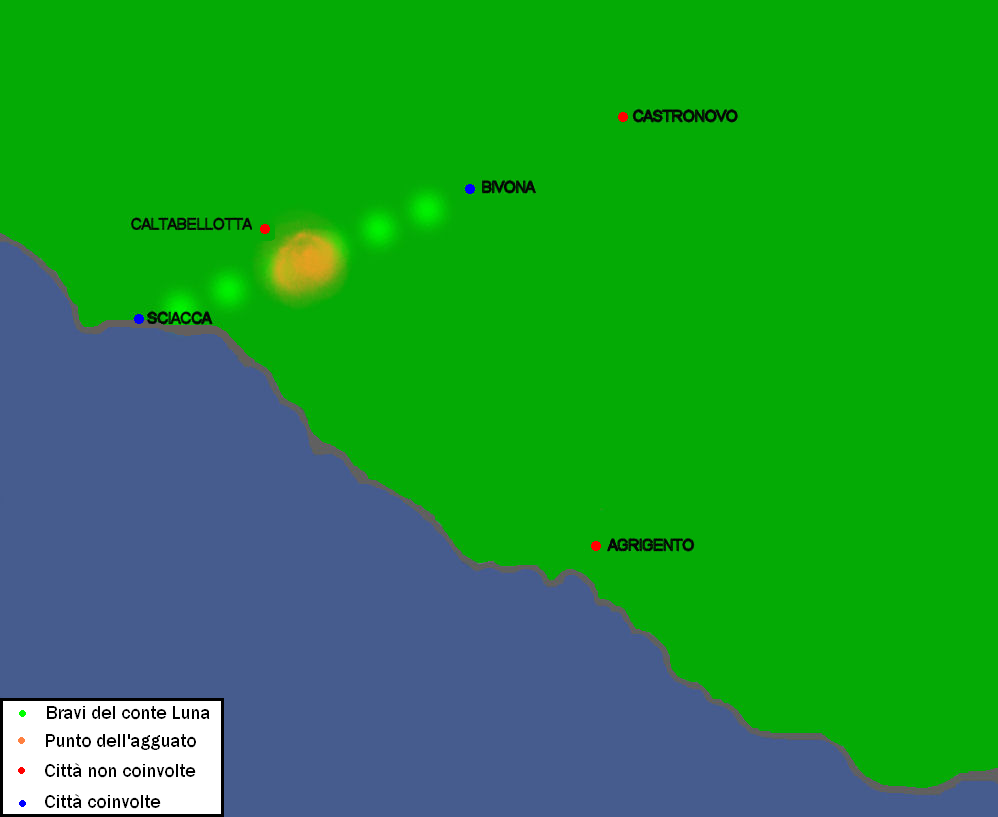
Map of the first clash between the factions

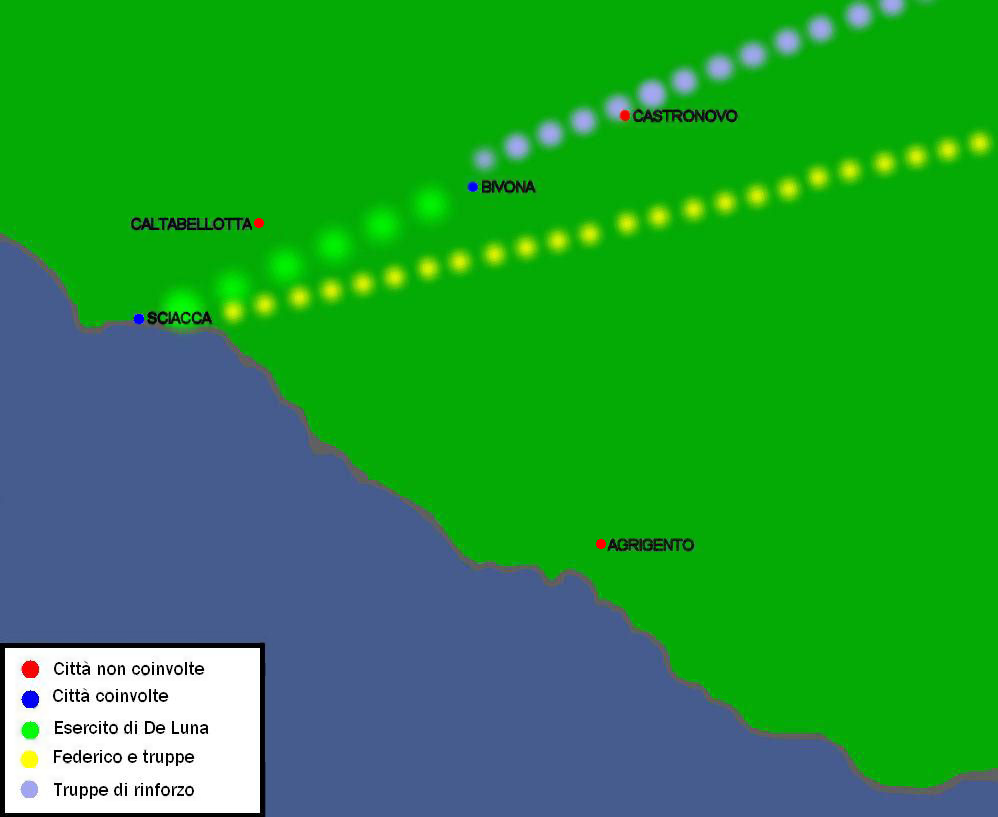
Map of the Battle of Blood Valley

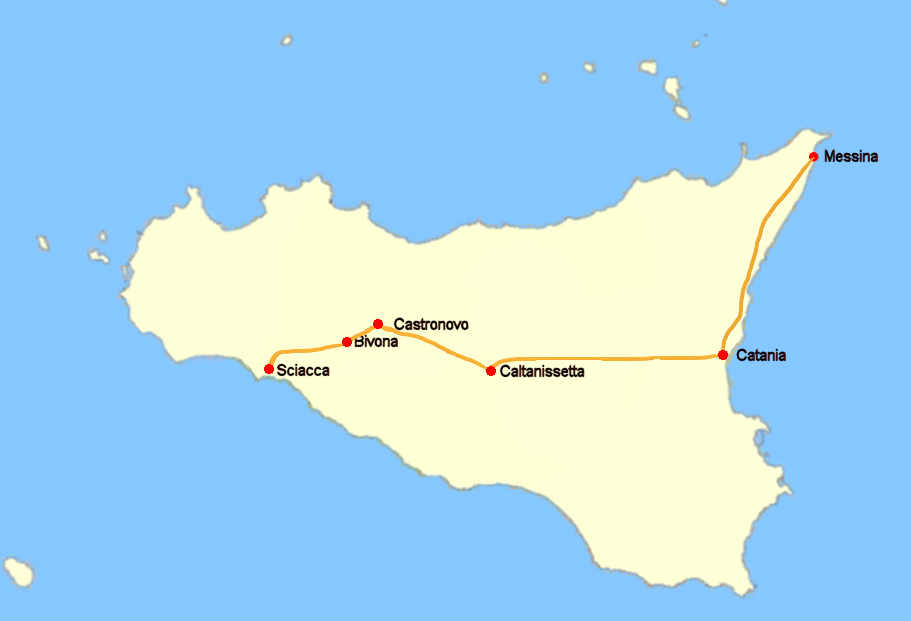
Messina-Sciacca route

== See also ==
- Bivona
- Sciacca

== Bibliography ==
- Cancila, Orazio (1984). Così andavano le cose nel secolo sedicesimo. Palermo: Sellerio Editore Palermo. ISBN 978-88-389-0339-7.
- Giordani, Gaetano (1842). Della venuta e dimora in Bologna del sommo pontefice Clemente VII per la coronazione di Carlo V imperatore celebrata l'anno 1530. Cronaca con note documenti ed incisioni. Bologna: Volpe.
- La Lumia, Isidoro (1862). La Sicilia sotto Carlo V imperatore: narrazione istorica con documenti inediti. Palermo: Fratelli Pedone Lauriel.
- Licata, Giuseppe (1881). Sciacca e le Terme Selinuntine. Sciacca: Tipografia I. Barone.
- Marrone, Antonino (1987). Bivona città feudale voll. I-II. Caltanissetta-Roma: Salvatore Sciascia Editore.
- Rosa, Mario; Verga, Marcello (2003). La storia moderna: 1450–1870. Torino-Milano: Bruno Mondadori. ISBN 978-88-424-9553-6.
- Savasta, Francesco (1726). Il famoso Caso di Sciacca. Palermo.
- Scaturro, Ignazio (1948). Il caso di Sciacca. Mazara del Vallo: Società editrice siciliana.
- Sedita, Giovan Battista (1909). Cenno storico-politico-etnografico di Bivona. Bivona.
- Vannucci, Marcello (1999). Le donne di casa Medici. Roma: Newton Compton Editori. ISBN 88-541-0526-0.
