= Inspector Montalbano =

Inspector Montalbano may refer to:

- Inspector Montalbano (TV series)
- Salvo Montalbano, the eponymous character in the above TV series and an earlier series of novels and short stories

== See also ==
- Montalbano (disambiguation)
- The Young Montalbano, a prequel to the Inspector Montalbano TV series
