= Sciacca =

- Comune
- Comune di Sciacca
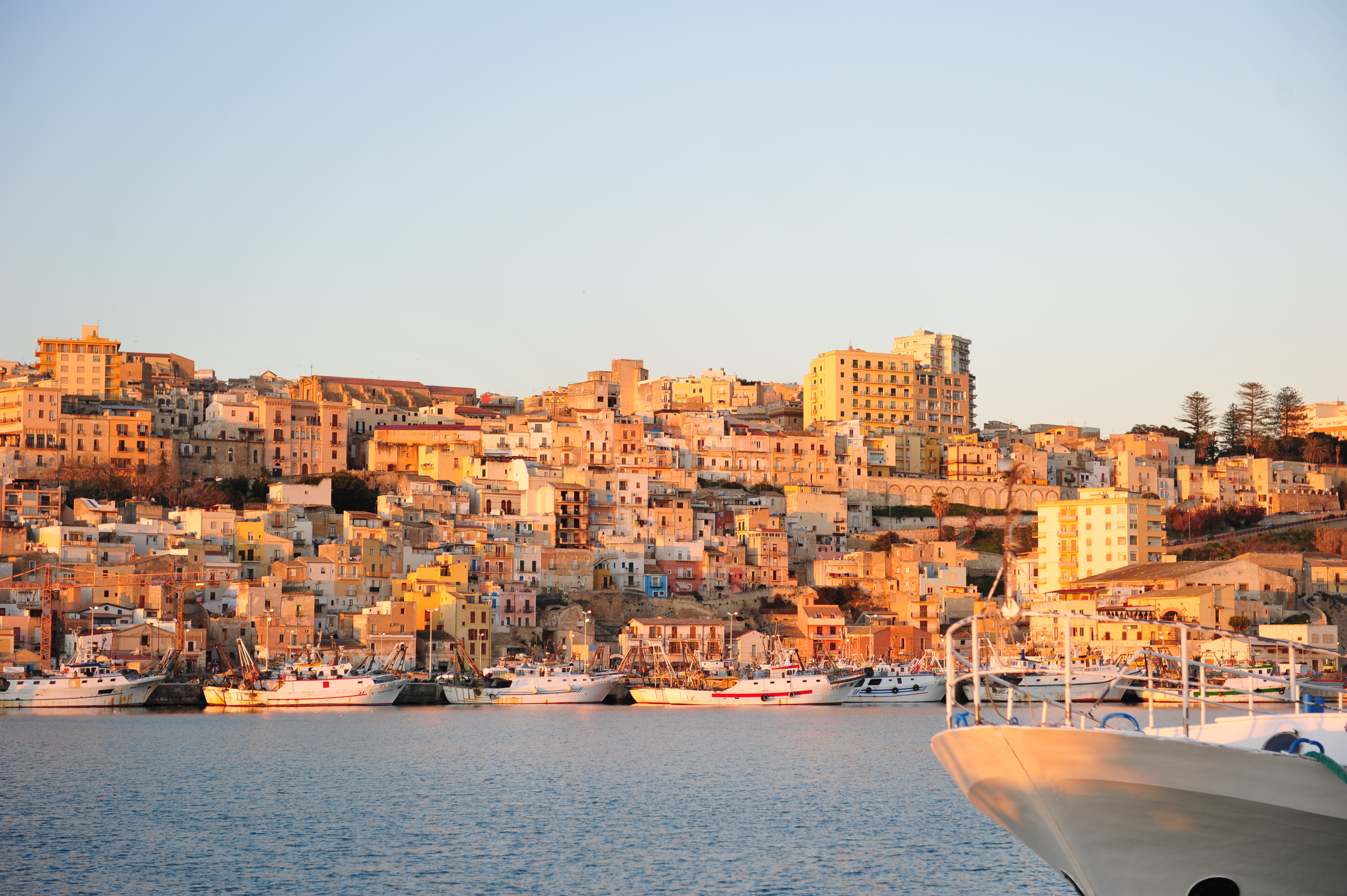
- View of Sciacca

- Coat of arms

- Location within Italy Location within Sicily
- Coordinates: 37°30′33″N 13°5′20″E
- Country: Italy
- Region: Sicily
- Province: Agrigento (AG)
- Frazioni: Lazzarino

Government
  - Mayor: Fabio Termine

Area
  - Total: 191.67 km^{2} (74.00 sq mi)
- Elevation: 60 m (200 ft)

Population (31 August 2022)
  - Total: 38,912
  - Density: 203.02/km^{2} (525.81/sq mi)
- Demonym(s): Saccensi, Sciacchitani
- Time zone: UTC+1 (CET)
  - Summer (DST): UTC+2 (CEST)
- Postal code: 92019
- Dialing code: 0925
- Patron saint: Holy Mary of Soccorso
- Saint day: 2 February
- Website: Official website

Sciacca (Italian and Sicilian: [ˈʃakka]; Ancient Greek: Θέρμαι, romanized: Thérmai; Latin: Thermae Selinuntinae, Thermae Selinuntiae, Thermae, Aquae Labrodes or Aquae Labodes) is a town and comune (municipality) in the province of Agrigento on the south-western coast of Sicily, Southern Italy. It overlooks the Mediterranean Sea.

The town was founded by the Sicani, an indigenous people of Sicily, in the 7th century BC. It has been known since ancient times for its thermal, sulfurous, and sodium-chloride waters. Throughout its history it has been dominated by different cultures and each period has left its mark on the city, enriching its historical heritage.

Ancient Greeks legends attributed the discovery of the thermal baths to mythical figures, Hercules or Daedalus depending on the version. Later, the Christians attributed the discovery of the baths to Calogerus the Anchorite.

The town reached its period of greatest splendor during the Norman rule, between the 11th and 12th centuries, when it became the centre of a rich county.

In the late Middle Ages, the clash between two powerful noble families gave rise to the so-called Sciacca Cases. The second case ended the dispute in 1530.

During the Spanish and Austrian rule Sciacca lost much of its maritime and commercial prosperity. Between the 16th and 18th centuries, naval trade routes were severely hampered by the constant presence of Barbary corsairs in the Mediterranean Sea, which profoundly damaged the city's economy. The recovery in trade was facilitated by the peace treaty signed between Charles VI and the North African cities of Tripoli and Tunis in 1726, which put an end to the emergence of pirates on those sea routes.

Under the Bourbon monarchy, between the second half of the 18th and 19th centuries, Sciacca became the seat of a sea consulate, responsible for the control and surveillance of the local maritime sector.

Today, Sciacca is the most populous town in the province after Agrigento. It is known for its historic carnival and its ceramics. Spa activities, despite being one of the town's main attractions, were suspended in 2015.

== History ==
=== Origins ===
The founders of the first inhabited center were the Sicani in the 7th century BC. They were an indigenous population of western Sicily who developed between the 2nd millennium and the 5th century BC, and were then absorbed by the Greek civilization. The Sican culture in the area is evidenced by the presence of numerous burial chambers.

=== Greek age ===
Thermae was founded in the 5th century BC by the Greeks, as its name suggests, as a thermal spa for Selinunte, 30 km distant, whose citizens came there to bathe in the sulphurous springs, still much valued for their medical properties, of Mount San Calogero which rises up behind the town. There is no account of the existence of a town on the site during the period of the independence of Selinunte, though the thermal waters would always have attracted some population to the spot. It seems to have been much frequented in the time of the Romans. At a later period they were called the Aquae Labodes or Larodes, under which name they appear in the Itineraries. Pliny was most likely mistaken in assigning the rank of a colonia to the southern, rather than northern, town of the same name. Strabo mentions the waters (τὰ ὕδατα τὰ Σελινούντια).

The origin of the town's name has been much debated, with Latin "ex acqua", as a reference to the springs of thermal water of the area, or Arabic "Syac", meaning bath, and al Saqquah, dating back to the cult of the Syrian god "Shai al Quaaum", as possibilities.

=== Medieval age ===
The city walls, the bastions and the Old Castle owe their existence to Roger the Great Count.

A royal city that had remained faithful to Manfred of Sicily during the Angevine invasion, by 1268 A.D. Sciacca was besieged by Charles I of Anjou and surrendered the following year. After the Sicilian Vespers, it established itself as a free commune. During the War of the Sicilian Vespers, the city was besieged numerous times; the final engagement of the 20-year war took place in 1302, when a French army failed to capture the city.

Following the Vespers era, the Peralta family took possession of it and obtained from the king of Sicily the right to mint coins. In the following centuries, the town was at the center of bloody feuds between rival baronial families (the Luna, of Aragonese origin, and the Perollo, of Norman stock), which nearly halved its population. In 1647, the impoverished town was the seat of an anti-Spanish rebellion.

=== Modern age ===
During World War II, the Italian Regia Aeronautica (Royal Italian Air Force) had a base near Sciacca.

== Geography ==
=== Overview ===
The municipality borders Caltabellotta, Menfi, Ribera and Sambuca di Sicilia.

=== Climate ===
Sciacca has a Mediterranean climate (Köppen climate classification: Csa), with short, mild and moderately rainy winters and long, hot and dry summers. The city receives around 450 millimeters (17.7 inches) of rain per year, experiencing a peak of 72.3 millimeters (2.8 inches) in November and a minimum of 2.5 millimeters (0.1 inch) in July.

Climate data for Sciacca, elevation 56 m (184 ft)
Month	Jan	Feb	Mar	Apr	May	Jun	Jul	Aug	Sep	Oct	Nov	Dec	Year
Record high °C (°F)	22.2 (72.0)	22.5 (72.5)	29.1 (84.4)	27.5 (81.5)	35.2 (95.4)	38.5 (101.3)	41.0 (105.8)	40.8 (105.4)	39.5 (103.1)	32.8 (91.0)	28.0 (82.4)	23.2 (73.8)	41.0 (105.8)
Mean daily maximum °C (°F)	15.0 (59.0)	15.3 (59.5)	16.8 (62.2)	19.1 (66.4)	23.8 (74.8)	28.0 (82.4)	31.0 (87.8)	30.9 (87.6)	28.0 (82.4)	24.2 (75.6)	19.9 (67.8)	16.2 (61.2)	22.3 (72.2)
Daily mean °C (°F)	11.7 (53.1)	11.7 (53.1)	13.0 (55.4)	14.9 (58.8)	18.9 (66.0)	22.7 (72.9)	25.7 (78.3)	25.8 (78.4)	23.4 (74.1)	19.9 (67.8)	16.1 (61.0)	12.8 (55.0)	18.1 (64.5)
Mean daily minimum °C (°F)	8.4 (47.1)	8.1 (46.6)	9.1 (48.4)	10.8 (51.4)	13.9 (57.0)	17.5 (63.5)	20.3 (68.5)	20.7 (69.3)	18.7 (65.7)	15.7 (60.3)	12.3 (54.1)	9.5 (49.1)	13.8 (56.8)
Record low °C (°F)	1.2 (34.2)	1.2 (34.2)	1.5 (34.7)	5.0 (41.0)	8.5 (47.3)	8.0 (46.4)	10.5 (50.9)	11.6 (52.9)	9.5 (49.1)	7.7 (45.9)	3.4 (38.1)	2.3 (36.1)	1.2 (34.2)
Average precipitation mm (inches)	70 (2.8)	61 (2.4)	54 (2.1)	41 (1.6)	22 (0.9)	4 (0.2)	2 (0.1)	9 (0.4)	25 (1.0)	81 (3.2)	67 (2.6)	80 (3.1)	516 (20.4)
Source: Regione Siciliana

== Main sites ==
Sciacca still retains much of its medieval layout, which divided the town into quarters, each laid out on a strip of rock descending toward the sea. Sciacca has several points of interest, including:

- Cathedral of Maria SS. del Soccorso (12th century, rebuilt in 1685)
- Castle of the Counts Luna; scarce remains can be still seen
- Church of Santa Margherita
- Chiesa del Carmine
- Church of San Michele (1371, rebuilt in the 17th century)
- Church of Santa Maria delle Giummare
- Palazzo Steripinto
- Palazzo Tagliavia (11th century), in neogothic style
- Palazzo Perollo (15th century)

== Culture ==
Sciacca's festivals include the Carnival, celebrated during the week before the beginning of Lent (February). The highlight of the festival is the parade of bizarre figures mounted on floats, famous throughout Sicily for their gaudy expressions. The local television stations are TRS Tele Radio Sciacca and RMK Tele Radio Monte Kronio.

== Diaspora ==
Starting around the turn of the 20th century, a number of residents of the Sciacca area emigrated to Norristown, Pennsylvania and the North End of Boston.

The Boston-based descendants of Sciacca, especially those from fishing families, have celebrated the Festival of the Madonna del Soccorso since 1910.

The Norristown-based descendants of Sciacca, through the local M.S.S. Club, founded in 1904, maintain both traditions and devotions to the Madonna del Soccorso. The M.S.S. holds a communion breakfast in February and a large festival (often called simply "The Feast") in August in celebration of the miracles performed by the Madonna herself in Sciacca.

== Economy ==
The economy of Sciacca is mainly based on agriculture, fishing and related food industries, as well as tourism.

== Gallery ==
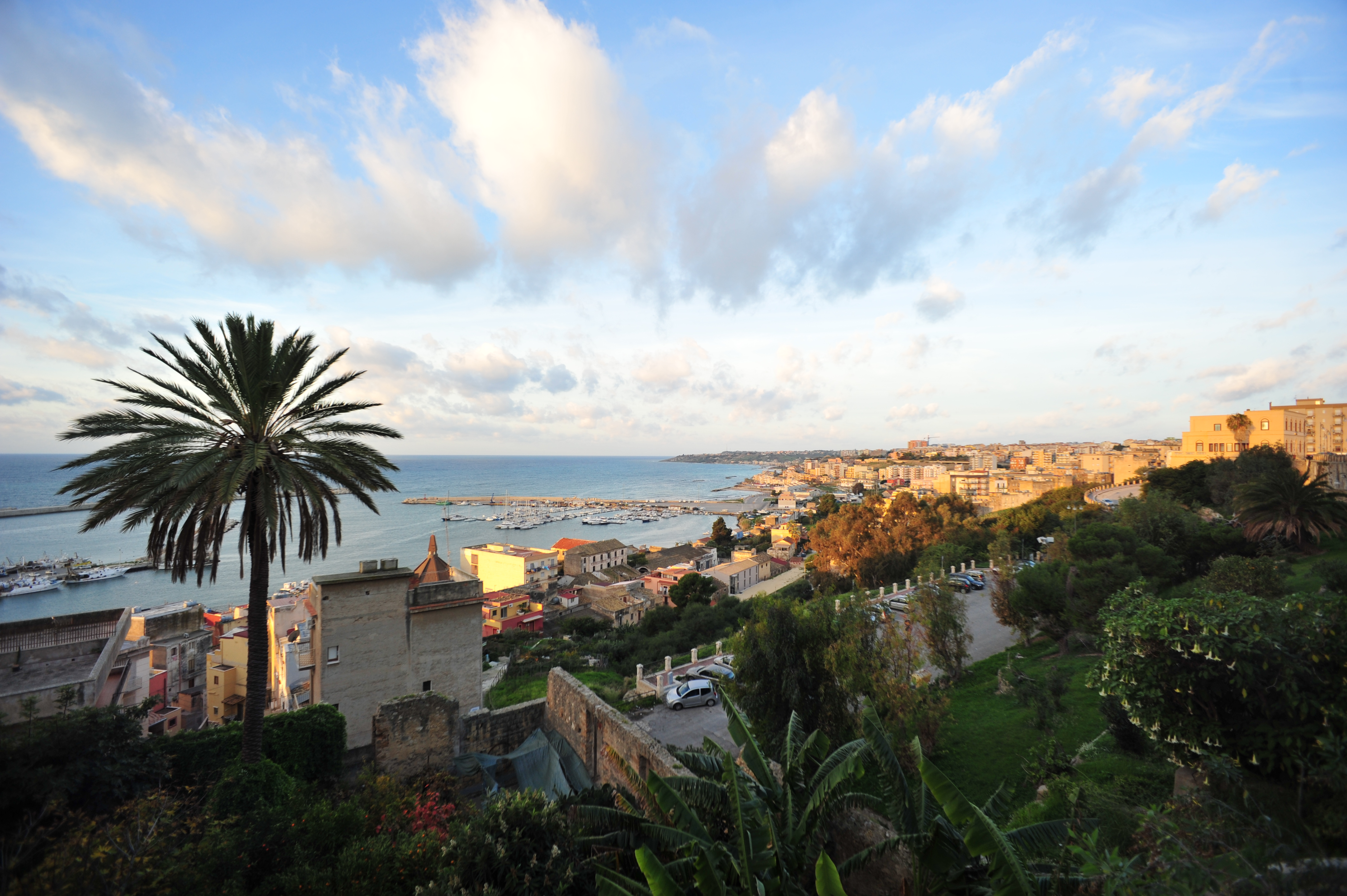
View from Piazza Scandaliato

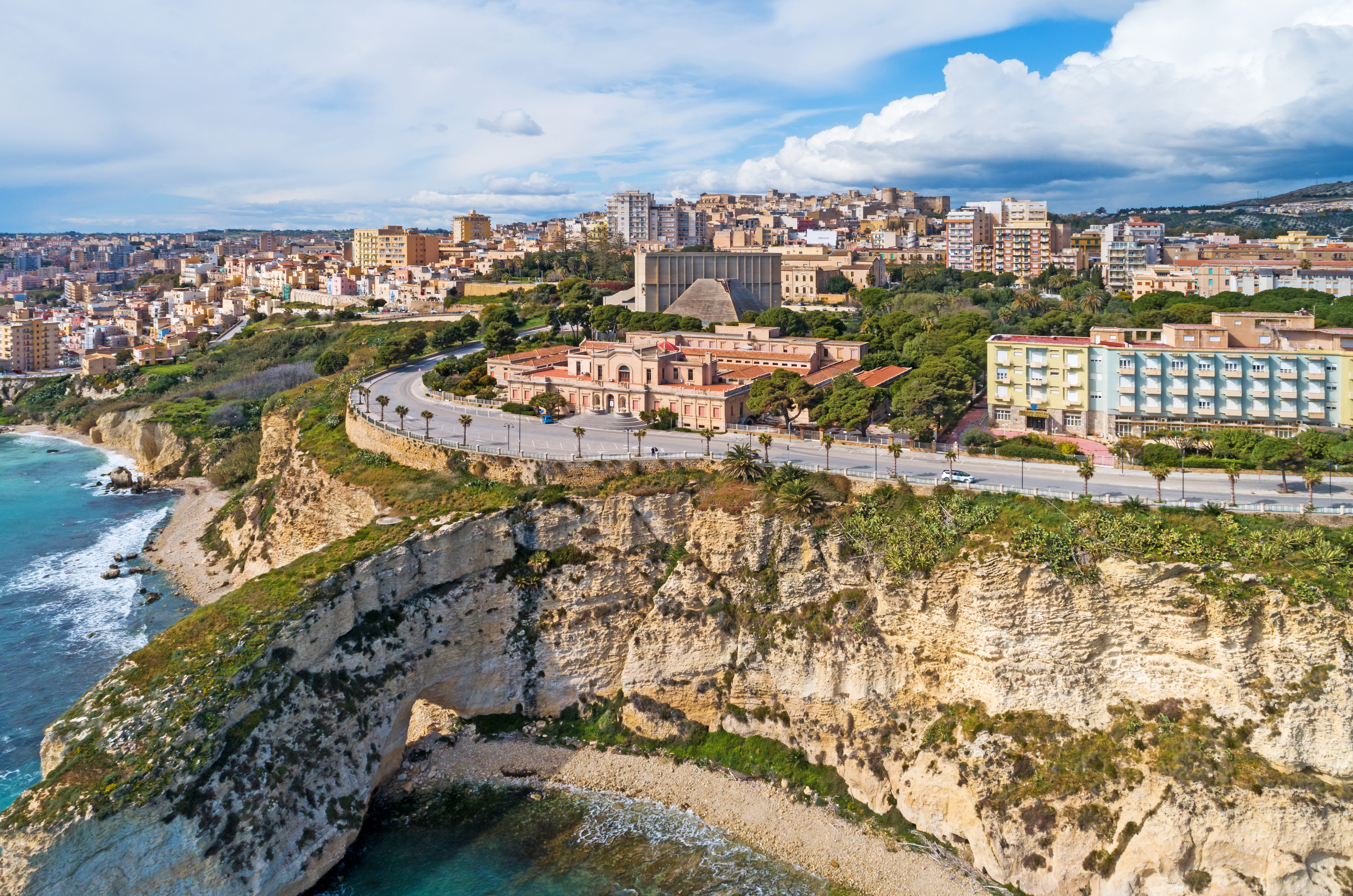

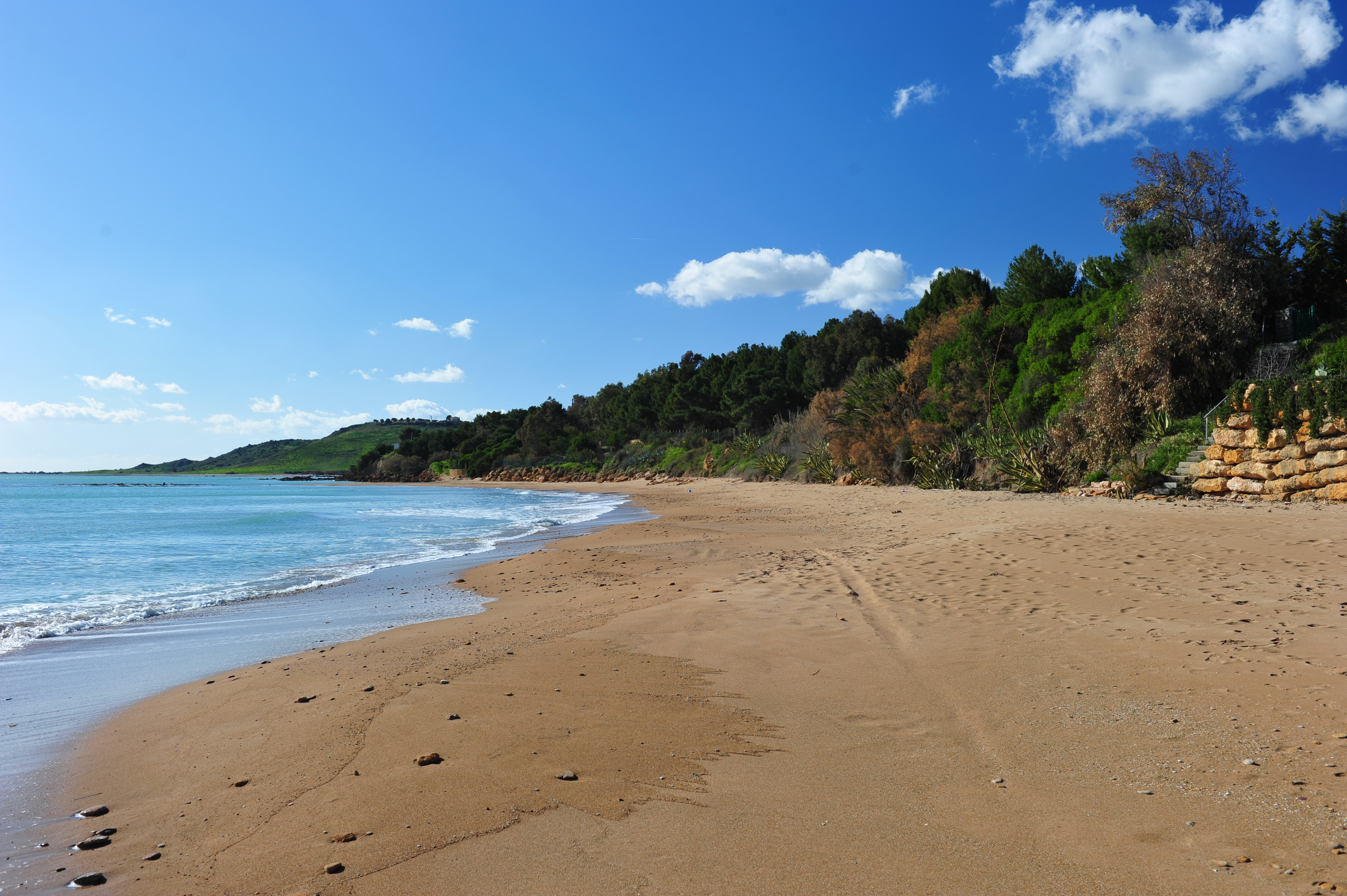
Beach of Timpi

== Sister cities ==
- Salvador, Brazil, since 2001
- Kırşehir, Turkey, since 2011
- Mustafakemalpaşa, Turkey, since 2011

== People ==
- Cataldo Amodei (1649–1693), baroque composer
- Giuseppe Mario Bellanca (1886–1960), airplane designer who created the first monoplane in the United States with an enclosed cabin
- Johnny Dundee (1893–1965), world featherweight and super featherweight champion
- Tommaso Fazello (1498–1570), authored the first printed history of Sicily
- Giovanni Antonio Medrano (1703–1760), Major Royal Governor of Mathematics of the Kingdom of Naples, chief engineer of the kingdom, royal architect, brigadier, and teacher of Charles III of Spain and his brothers the infantes. He is the architect who designed the San Carlo opera house and Palace of Capodimonte in Naples.
- Andrea Tummiolo (born 1984), footballer

== See also ==
- Second case of Sciacca
