= Calogerus the Anchorite =

Eremite monk venerated by the Orthodox and the Catholic churches

Saint Calogerus
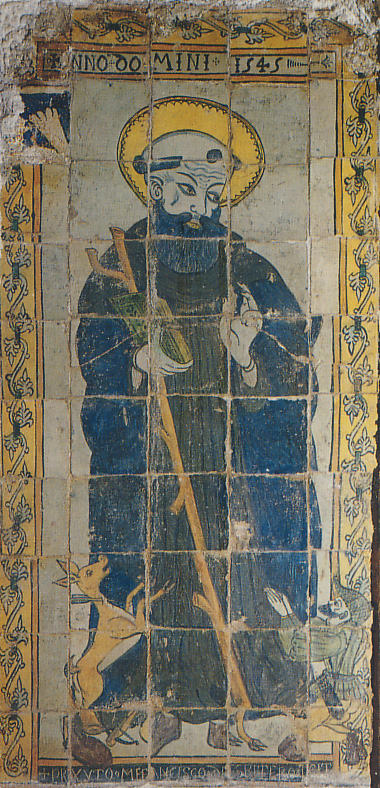
- Icon of Saint Calogerus from the grotto above Mount Kronio, dated 1545

Anchorite, Hermit, Calogerus of Sicily, Calogerus of San Calogero
- Born: c. 466; Chalcedonia
- Residence: Monte Kronio
- Died: 561; Sciacca
- Venerated in: Catholic Church, Eastern Orthodox Church
- Major shrine: Sanctuary of San Calogero, Agrigento, Sicily
- Feast: 18 June
- Attributes: Hermit, Basilian abbot
- Patronage: Naro, Campofranco, Petralia Sottana, and San Salvatore di Fitali in Sicily
- Tradition or genre: Hermetical, Basilian

Calogeros the Anchorite (Ancient Greek: Καλόγερος ὁ Αναχωρητής, romanized: Kalogeros ho Anakhorētēs, Kalogeros o Anakhoritis, Latin: Calogerus or Calocerus, Sicilian: Calòjiru and Caloriu, Italian: Calogero, also known as Calogerus the Hermit and Calogerus of Sicily, Chalcedon c. 466 – 18 June, 561, Monte Kronio) was a hermetical monk, venerated as a saint by the Catholic and Orthodox churches, and the patron of many places in Sicily.

== Veneration ==
Calogerus is commemorated by the Orthodox Church on June 18, together with the bishop Gregorius and the deacon Demetrius. The three saints are noted as opponents of Arianism who fled from Africa to Sicily to escape persecution. They were active in the area of Fragalata, near Messina. Calogerus is commemorated on the same day in the Catholic Church. Calogerus is also held to have worked as a missionary on Lipari in the Aeolian Islands, before retiring to live as a hermit on Monte Kronio, which is now sometimes called in Sicilian: Monte San Caluòru (Italian: Monte San Calogero) in his honor, as is another mountain near Palermo.

Saint Calogerus is venerated at Agrigento more than Saint Gerland, who is the patron of Agrigento. Other centres in which Saint Calogero is particularly venerated are Porto Empedocle, Naro, Sciacca, Frazzanó, San Salvatore di Fitalia, Cesaró, Petralia Sottana and Campofranco. In iconography, he is usually identifiable as a bearded hermit with olive complexion wearing eastern (Syriac) hooded vestments.

== See also ==
- Caloyers – Greek monks who followed the rule of Saint Basi
- Calogero – Italian given, family and place name
