= Calogero Rizzuto (architect) =

Italian cultural heritage official (1955–2020)

- Born: 20 January 1955; Sambuca di Sicilia, Sicily, Italy
- Died: 23 March 2020 (aged 65); Syracuse, Sicily, Italy
- Education: University of Palermo
- Occupation: Architect

Calogero Rizzuto (20 January 1955 – 23 March 2020) was an Italian architect and historic preservationist.

== Life and career ==
Rizzuto graduated from University of Palermo with a degree in architecture in 1983 and worked as a resident architect in Rosolini until 1989. In the following years, he acquired great competence as a manager in the cultural and tourism sector through projects in Sicily.

Since 2007, Rizzuto had been responsible for the cultural heritage of the Sicilian region on the Soprintendenzen in Ragusa and Syracuse. He also worked at the Museum of Kamarina. Since Summer 2019, he held the position of First Director of the Archaeological Parks of Syracuse (Parco Archeologico della Neapolis, Villa Romana del Tellaro, ancient Heloros) and devoted himself to the further development and securing of the archaeological sites.

Rizzuto, who lived in Rosolini, was married and had two children. He died on 23 March 2020, at the age of 65 from COVID-19 during the COVID-19 pandemic in Italy.
