= History of Bivona =

History of the municipality of Bivona, Italy

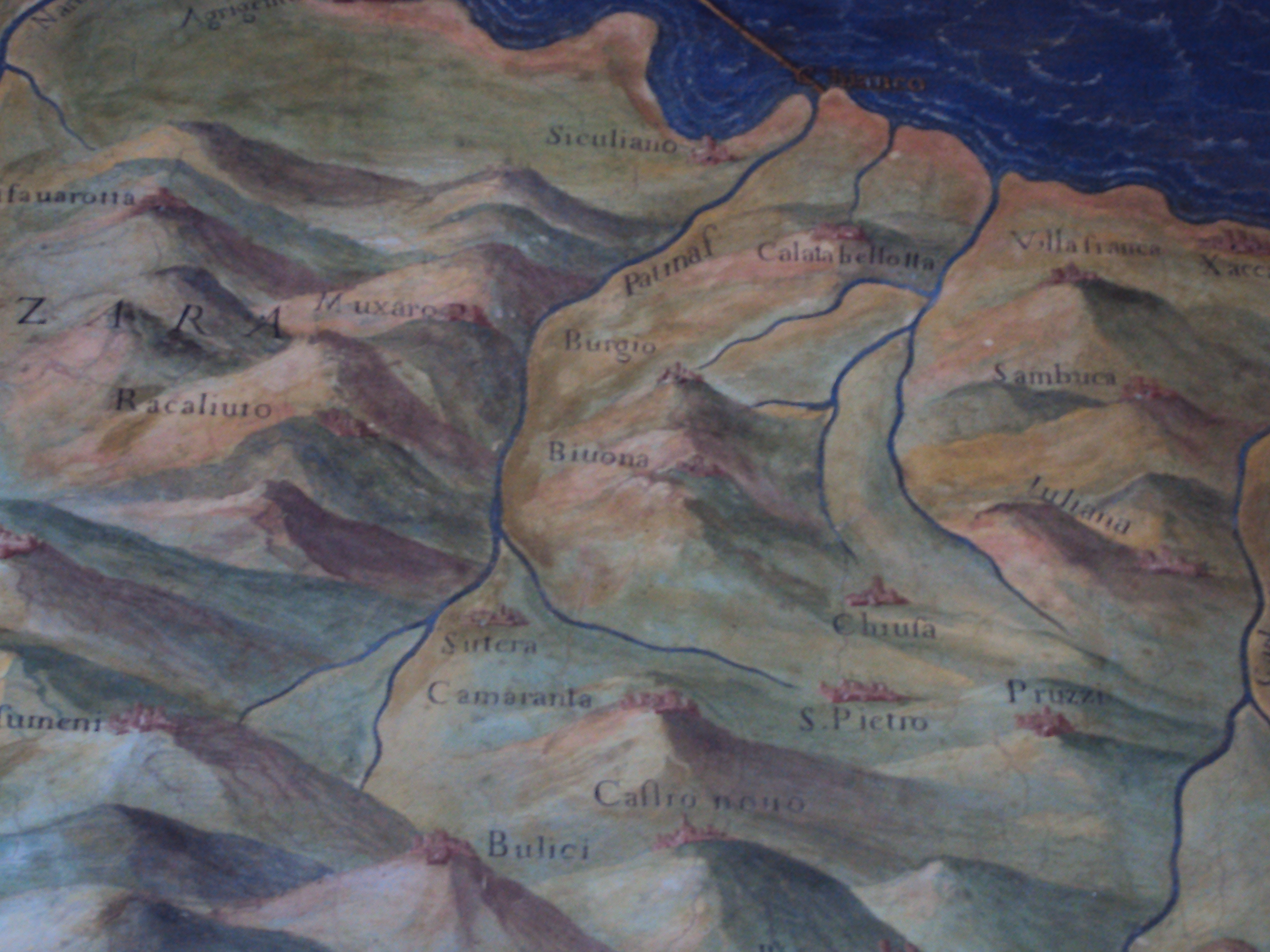
Bivona shown on the map of Sicily featured in the Gallery of Maps at the Vatican Museums

The history of Bivona, an Italian municipality in the province of Agrigento in Sicily, begins with the appearance of the first human settlements in the municipal area dating back to the Copper Age. Also documented in the Bivona area are settlements from the Greek, late Roman and medieval periods. The town of Bivona, although sometimes believed to be of Islamic origin, is documented from 1160: first a simple hamlet, then a lordship, it was one of the main feudal centers of the Vallo di Mazara.

In 1554 Emperor Charles V elevated Bivona, the first among Sicilian cities, to the rank of duchy, giving it the title of city; until 1812, therefore, the town was administered by noble Spanish families (De Luna of Aragon, Moncada, Alvarez de Toledo), which, however, caused its social and economic decline.

Following the abolition of feudalism, Bivona became the capital of a Bourbon district; in 1860, having become part of the Kingdom of Savoy, Bivona filled the role of capital of the district of the same name in the province of Girgenti.

== Prehistoric age ==
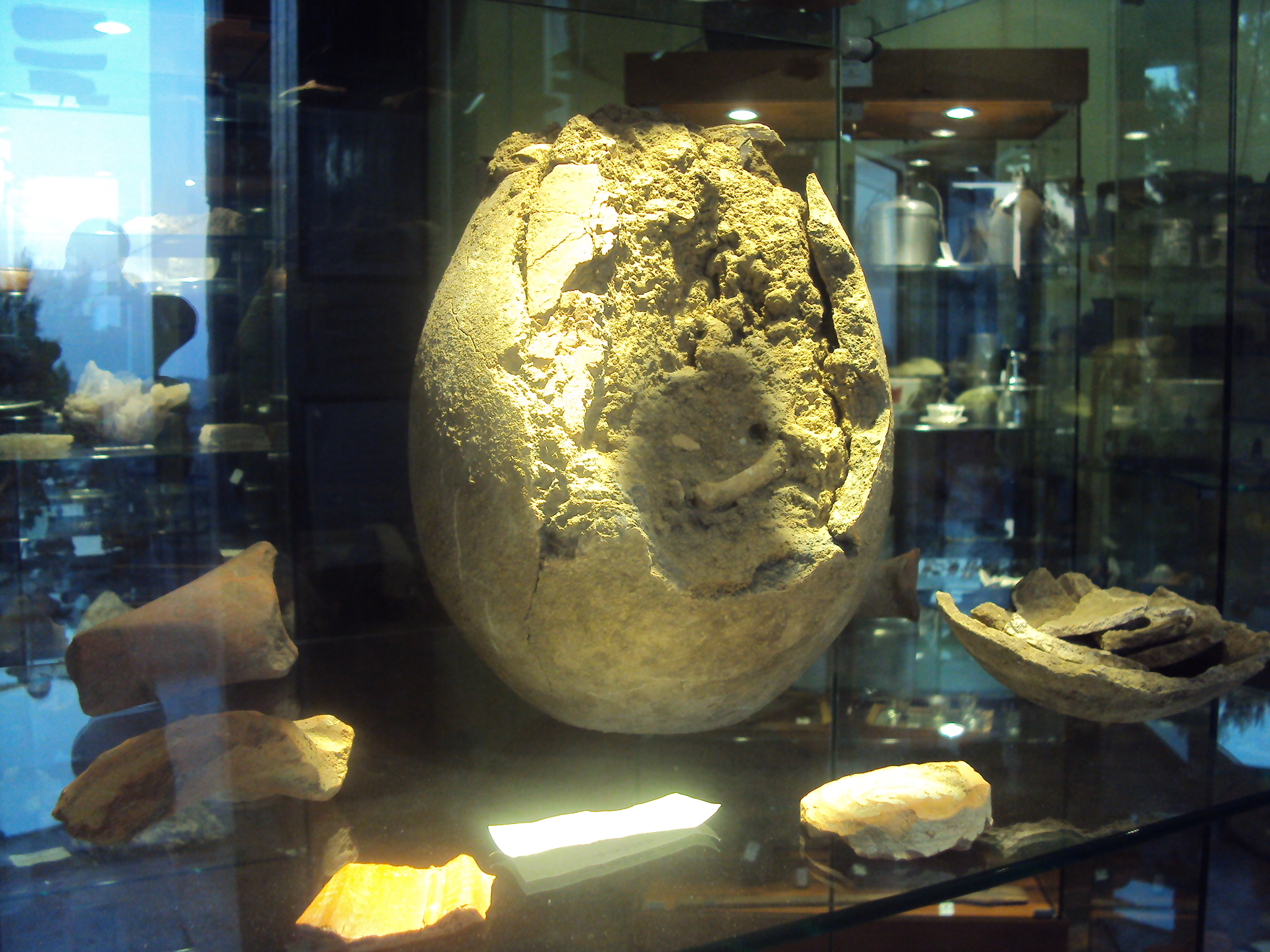
Enchytrismòs burial from the Millaga necropolis and exhibited in the Civic Museum of Cianciana.

Various archaeological findings have confirmed human presence in the Bivona area since the Copper Age (3rd millennium B.C.).

The survey (Agrigent Survey) conducted by the archaeological team led by Professor Johannes Bergemann of the Georg-August University of Göttingen in 2009–2010 uncovered remains of the prehistoric age in the Bivona territory, including a rock necropolis.

The study and analysis of sporadic archaeological finds in the territory of Bivona had previously been carried out mainly by Cesare Sermenghi, author of Missing Minor Worlds and The Past and Its Answers, and by the Bivonese Salvatore Midulla, author of Bivona, the Origins and Early History.

Some Serraferlicchio pottery shards testify to a settlement dating back to the Eneolithic; in a small plateau of modest size, due to the discovery of some pottery belonging to the facies of Sant'Angelo Muxaro, there is evidence of a settlement dating back to the 8th century B.C., on the Monte delle Rose overlooking Bivona.

In the former fief of Pollicìa, located a few kilometers west of the town of Bivona, in the municipal territory of Palazzo Adriano, various archaeological finds have been unearthed, including pottery shards of the Serraferlicchio style.

The finds date back to the Copper Age: some sherds are part of a dipper cup, others are part of another cup, painted with dark-gray vertical bands; a lobster-red ceramic tumbler bottom and other relics belonging to objects decorated with latticework were also found. Finally, two large fragments of red pottery were found that were part of a thick and shiny bowl.

Some enclosures, believed to be small tomb structures, were also noted in the area. The abundant presence in the Pollicia district of chalky rock allowed the indigenous peoples the easy exploitation of underground dwellings and mineral deposits of salt, believed to be the first means of exchange between the indigenous Eneolithic civilization and the newly introduced Aegean-Mycenaean one.

== Ancient age ==
=== Scholarly hypotheses about ancient Bivona ===
A passage from Strabo, which mentions Hipponium, mistakenly identified with Bivona instead of the city of Vibo Valentia in present-day Calabria, led some 16th-century scholars to place Bivona as the place where, according to the ancients, the mythological rape of Persephone took place.

Also Francesco Maurolico, based on the identification of Hipponium with Bivona, situated there the "place of delights" called "Horn of Amalthea," built by the tyrant Gelon of Syracuse. This identification, already rejected by some seventeenth-century scholars, was still revived in the eighteenth and nineteenth centuries, even up to local scholar Giovan Battista Sedita in the early twentieth century.

A founding of Bivona in the third century B.C. by refugees from the city of Hippana, mentioned by Polybius and Diodorus Siculus and destroyed in 258 B.C., during the First Punic War and from whose name would derive that of Bivona, has also been hypothesized.

Other smaller settlements have also been hypothesized in the vicinity of Bivona: in the seventeenth century, Rocco Pirri, echoing Tommaso Fazello argued that the ancient cities of "Platanello," or Platanella, and "Muzaro," or Muzzaro, would have arisen there.

Cesare Sermenghi also speculated that the Bivonese district of San Matteo was the location of the ancient Sicilian city of Makella, mentioned by Polybius, Diodorus Siculus and Cassius Dio, although there are other hypotheses regarding its location. According to Sermenghi, in turn Makella would have been identifiable with the ancient city of Muzzaro, which is instead identifiable with archaeological remains near Sant'Angelo Muxaro. Sermenghi also believed that the locality of Adranon, mentioned in the sources as being close to Makella, would have been identifiable with the Rifesi forest in the territory of Palazzo Adriano, near Bivona.

=== Toponym ===
The similarity of the name Bivona with Hipponium (or Ipponio or Hippana) had already been noted by modern historians, from Aretio to Amico. In 1709 the Jesuit Giovanni Andrea Massa enumerated all the toponymic designations of Bivona, later used by other historiographers. In the 19th century Michele Amari included Bivona in a list of towns in Sicily that, having first been attested to in the Norman period, may have been founded by settlers from central and northern Italy who arrived in Sicily at that time and who would have imposed the names of their city of origin on the new centers: Bivona was paired with Bibbona, a Tuscan town in the province of Livorno: the hypothesis, however, seems untrue, since Bivona was certainly inhabited by Arab people, who settled in Sicily before the coming of the Normans. In the second half of the 20th century Cesare Sermenghi confirmed the possible derivation of the place name Bivona from Hippana; in his book Mondi minori scomparsi (1981), he stated:

Now, apart from any document: to corroborate in the larger story the mixture of the men of Hippana, the following glottological interpretation can be made, i.e., the linguistic "excavation" that is comparatively set forth below:

- a) Hippo Regius and Hippo Ziarytus, two cities of Numidia;
- b) Hippona, so named later the Hippo Regius of Numidia (reminiscent of the Bishop of Hippona, St. Augustine);
- c) Hipponio or Hipponium, a city in Lucania, later called Vibone and then Bivona, then Vibo Valentia;
- d) Hipanis, now Bug, river north of Puntus Euxinus (Black Sea);
- e) Hippana, near Prizzi (Palermo), denotes the same toponymic origin whose root over time undergoes the inevitable erosion and thus the homophonic metamorphosis that follows:
  1. Hippo Regius becomes Bon;
  2. Hippo Ziarytus becomes Bon;
  3. Hippona becomes Bona;
  4. Hipanis becomes Bug;
  5. Hipponium (Catanzaro), becomes Bivona, then Vibona and then Vibo Valentia, which is an uneroded form.

From the above homophonic examinations, we therefore infer that Hippana (near Prizzi) gave toponymic birth to Bivona (Agrigento)

— Cesare Sermenghi, Mondi minori scomparsi, 1981

In 1987, however, the Bivonese Antonino Marrone did not accept the hypothesis put forward a few years earlier by Sermenghi, stating that it does not appear that the evolution of the language of the populations gravitating on the Sicani mountains had until the 12th century made any changes to the name Ippana, not detecting, therefore, a toponymic relationship between Ippana and Bivona; however, he assured that although the village had been during the Middle Ages a pagus Saracenorum (a village inhabited by Muslims), the name Bivona is not of Arab derivation: the village's foundation is therefore to be assumed at a date prior to the invasion of Sicily by the Arabs.

Furthermore, Antonino Marrone noted the existence of several toponyms widespread in antiquity and having the same root as Bivona, but of which there is no documented relationship with other toponyms having Ippo as roots. Finally, he emphasized the analysis of some historians and linguists who asserted that the ancient name of Calabrian Hipponio (Vibo Valentia) was Vibo, now also preserved in the name of its small hamlet Bivona.

Regarding the etymology of the name of the Calabrian city, the following is what the priest Francesco Albanese wrote in 1962 in his work Vibo Valentia nella sua storia:

Two distinct settlements had, from very remote times, the same name of Hippònion, one on the Tyrrhenian Sea south of Vibo Marina and the other on the hill behind, four kilometers away. In a straight line, in a pleasant, wide-terraced place gently sloping to the sea, northeast of present-day Vibo Valentia. Hippònion was founded by Siculi or rather by indigenous Brettii, as indicated by the Osco-Sabellian name Vei, Veip, 'Eipon, Eiponion handed down to us from the oldest coins. The Greeks converted the primitive name to the style of the ancient language to Hippònion and the Romans to Vibo, Vibona and later to Bibo, Bibona, Bivona. Some mistakenly have derived the name Hippònion from the Greek ἵππος, horse, to signify the valor and generosity of the inhabitants and the equine form of the building or the town itself nurturing excellent horses; others, however, from Ubo, an Oriental word meaning inlet, changed by the Greeks to Hippò, Hippònion, a town in the center of the inlet.

— Francesco Albanese, Vibo Valentia nella sua storia, 1962

The name Bivona is believed to be a name of non-Arabic derivation; it is found in this form for the first time in a document of 1171, although the most frequent form until the early sixteenth century was Bibona. The form Bisbona was most likely first used by Frederick III, in a letter dated 28 September 1363, sent to Giovanni Chiaramonte. This variant is probably due to a learned re-elaboration: in a letter of 1553 it was written:

Bisbona quoque vulgo Bivona dicitur
Bisbona, which the populace also calls "Bivona"

Again in 1557 an erudite explanation is given:

It is this land called Bivona, almost Bi-bona, that is, bis-bona, because of the perfection of the air, being placed above very high cliffs and because of the abundance of the salutary waters and fruitful trees, of which it supremely abounds, a place truly more than good and most pleasant.

There is also the form Vivona, now used in the local dialect.

=== Archaeological sites ===
Archaeological areas	
Prehistoric settlements	Serra di Cuti
Prehistoric settlements	Pietre Cadute
Prehistoric settlements	Monte Castelluccio
Prehistoric settlements	Serra di Caraha
Greek settlements	Monte Mezzo Canale
Greek settlements	Pietre Cadute
Greek settlements	Monte Castelluccio
Greek settlements	Contrada il Ponte
Roman settlements	Monte delle Rose
Roman settlements	Monte Mezzo Canale
Roman settlements	Monte il Casino
Roman settlements	Monte Chirullo
Roman settlements	Vallone Salito
Roman settlements	Contrada Madonna dell'Olio
Roman settlements	Maidda
Roman settlements	Ferraria
Roman settlements	Pietre Cadute
Roman settlements	Contrada Millaga
Roman settlements	Monte Castelluccio
Roman settlements	Contrada il Ponte
Medieval settlements	Pizzo San Matteo
Medieval settlements	Vallone Lordo
Medieval settlements	Contrada Margi
Medieval settlements	Maidda
Medieval settlements	Ferraria
Medieval settlements	Monte Castelluccio
Settlements of uncertain age	Contrada Madonna dell'Olio
Settlements of uncertain age	Montata Baida
Settlements of uncertain age	Contrada Millaga

== Medieval Age ==
=== Origins of Bivona ===
The oldest document that has come down to us in which Bivona (mentioned as Bibona) is mentioned dates from 1160. In 1171 it is mentioned as a casale.

According to a hagiographic biography of St. Rosalia, published in 1650 by Jesuit Father Francesco Sparacino, the saint is said to have lived for five years (from 1149 to 1154) at the Mount of Roses in Bivona, a then uninhabited land and feud of her father Sinibaldo, from where she was removed when the forest in which she lived in hermitage was cut down for the foundation of the city.

In the following 13th century Bivona is mentioned among the centers of the diocese of Agrigento in 1260 and is still mentioned in 1264, in the 1270s, and in 1281.

Alfonso Airoldi and Gaetano Di Giovanni supposed a Byzantine origin of Bivona, the latter also cited by Biagio Pace.

=== Darptein Taibah: Islamic age ===
quod olim Ruggerii et Guillermorum Siciliae regum aetate Saracenorum pagus erat ut eorum diplomatibus memoria proditum est.
[Bivona] which was once, at the time of the kings of Sicily Roger and the two Williams, a Saracen village, as has been handed down by their diplomas

— Tommaso Fazello, De Rebus Siculis decades II, 1560

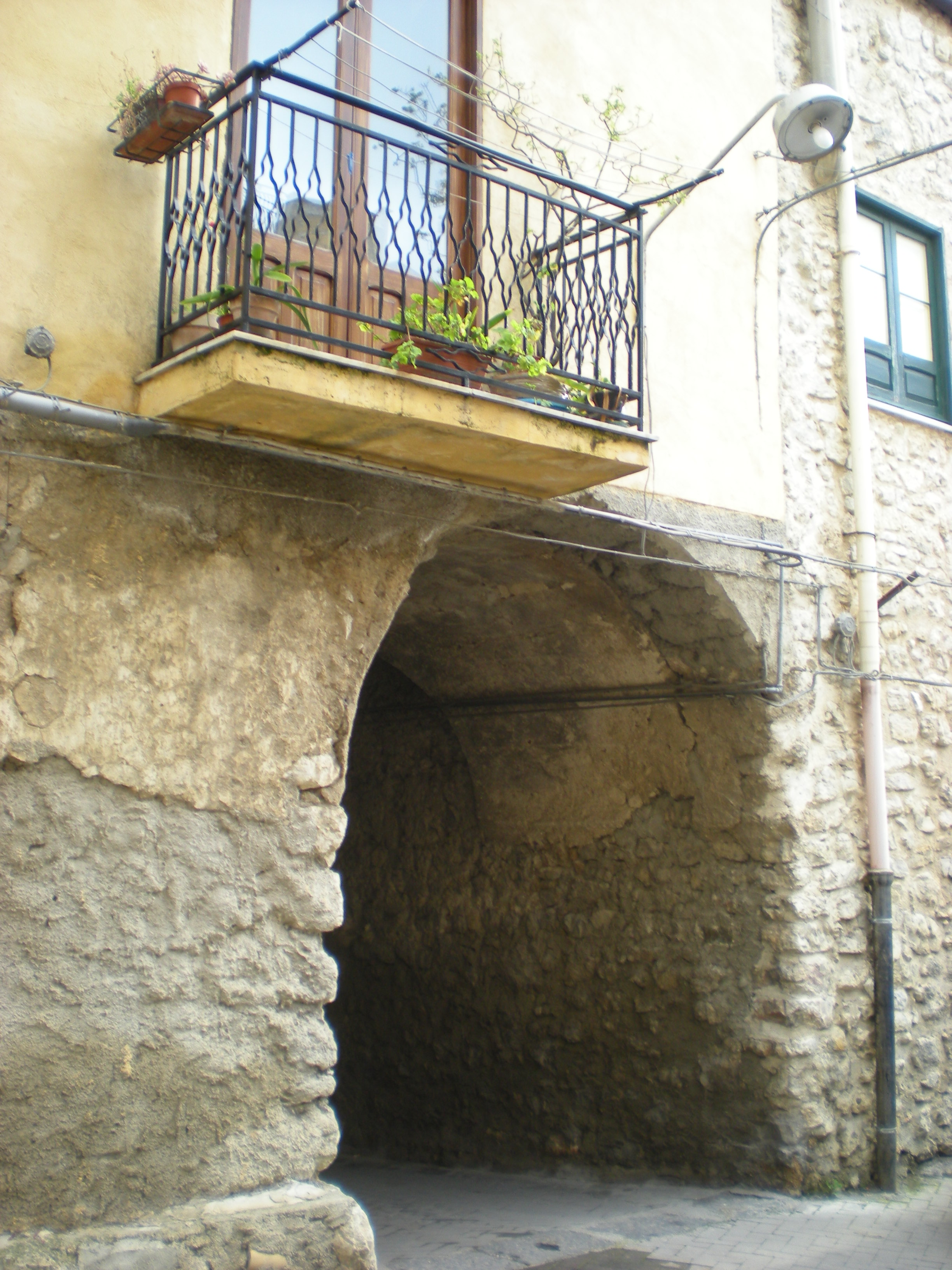
Xanèa between Sirretta Street and Guggino Square

Saracen incursions, which began in Sicily in the seventh century, quickly led to the Arab conquest of the entire island during the ninth century and the formation of the Emirate of Sicily until the expulsion by the Normans in the eleventh century.

The presence of the Arabs in Bivona would be attested by the presence in the local dialect of toponyms and terms of Arab origin (including xanèa). In this period the name of the settlement would have been Darptae Intaiba, attested on some maps of Sicily relating to that period.

An origin of the settlement in Arab times had also been hypothesized by the sixteenth-century scholar Tommaso Fazello, in the second edition of his work (De Rebus Siculis decades II of 1560), who considered Bivona a pagus Saracenorum, that is, a village inhabited by Arab people. In 1580 the historian Marco Antonio Martines described Bivona in the same manner as Fazello, and in 1873 the Castronovese historian Luigi Tirrito accepted, albeit with some objections, that Bivona may have been a Saracen village. There must have been a place of worship in the village, probably a mosque, the location of which is not known and of which there are no more traces.

Al-Ballanūbī, a well-known Arab-Sicilian poet, was born in Villa Noba, a hamlet near Bivona.

The War of the Vespers

According to some documents taken from De Rebus Regni Siciliae, Bivona is said to have actively participated in the War of the Vespers, called the "War of the Ninety Years" because it was fought between 1282 and 1372.

In 1909 the Bivona historian Giovan Battista Sedita, in his work entitled Cenno storico-politico-etnografico di Bivona, wrote:

I am not talking about the short-lived rule of Charles of Anjou with the famous Sicilian Vespers of 1282, in which Bivona took part (see Michele Amari's history of the Vespers) and in no small part, responded to the call.

In Michele Amari's work cited by Sedita, moreover, reference is made to Robert of Anjou's concession of the castle of Bivona to Giacomo of Catania: this is the first certain data on the lordship of Bivona.

During the years of the conflict it is assumed that the inhabitants of the hamlets located in the surrounding area moved to Bivona, as it was equipped with efficient defensive structures that would have offered shelter and protection. In 1282 the town was asked to contribute to the collection of provisions for the army: Bivona offered 100 bushels of wheat, 200 of barley, 100 pigs, 200 geldings, 36 ounces of gold, and 10 archers.

The first phase of the War of the Vespers ended with the signing of the peace treaty between the Angevins and the Aragonese in nearby Caltabellotta.

=== Lordship of Bivona ===
In 1299 Robert of Anjou is said to have granted, along with the castle of Calatamauro, the castle of Bivona, mentioned on this occasion for the first time, to Giacomo of Catania, who was supposed to drive out Ugone Talach.

The Descriptio Feudorum lists Simone of Montecateno (or Moncada) as lord of Bivona.

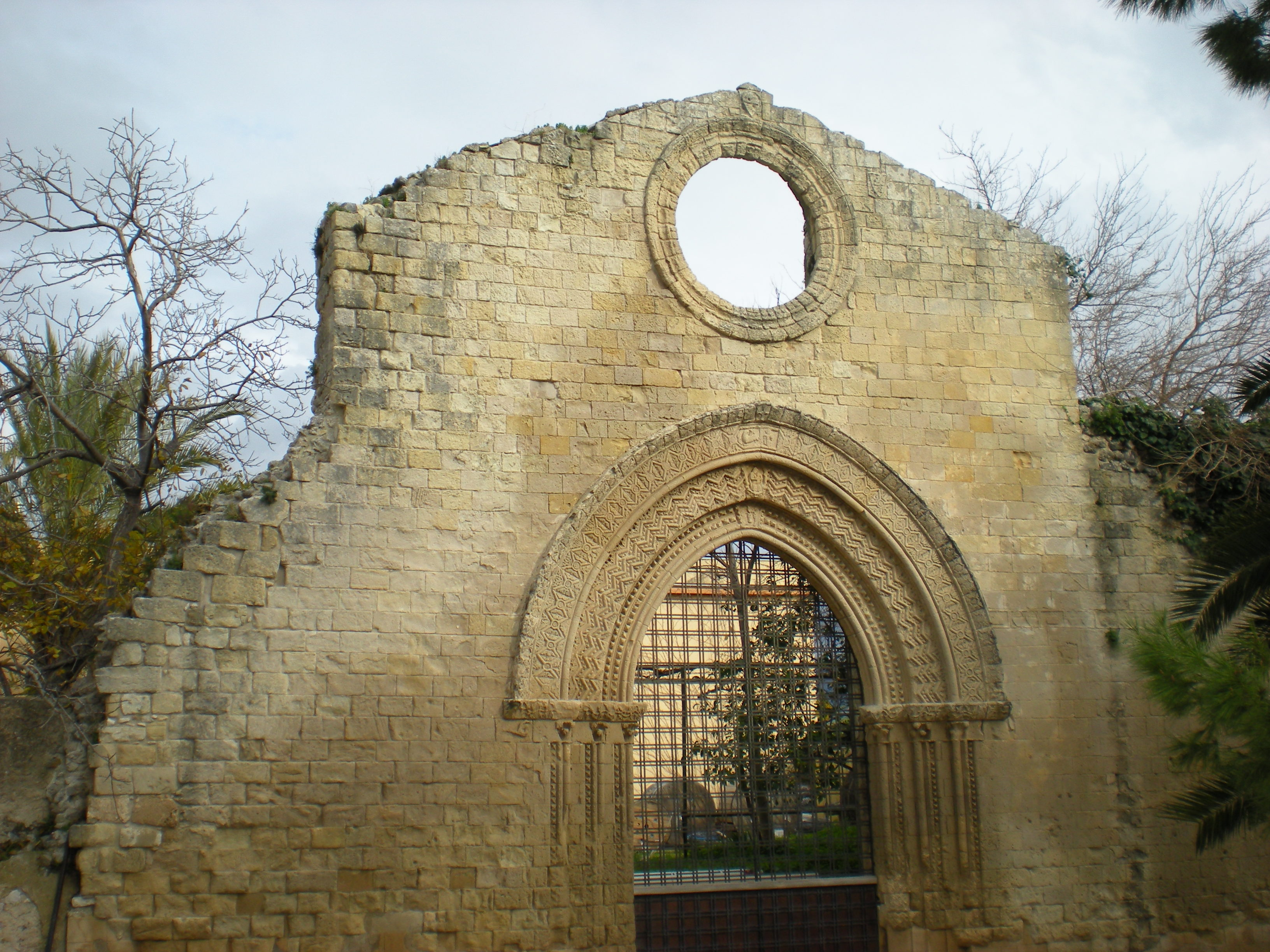
The portal of the "chiaramontana" mother church, built between the 13th and 14th centuries

In 1353 the Chiaramontes, with the help of the Angevins, rebelled against King Louis of Aragon, whose guardian had become Blasco II Alagona following the death of Matteo Palizzi. Bivona also took part in the revolt, but after Frederick IV of Aragon's victory at Aci on 27 May 1357, he abandoned the Chiaramontan faction, returning to it in 1359. Internal discord between the royal and Chiaramontan faction caused the intervention of royal troops under the command of Francis II Ventimiglia, who occupied Bivona and sacked it. After their departure, the Chiaramontes attempted to seize the castle, left in the custody of Claudio Doria, and failing to breach its defenses, they abandoned the town, which was again sacked. In 1360 Corrado Doria became the new lord of Bivona, who was succeeded by his son Antonello, but by 1363 the lordship had passed to Giovanni III Chiaramonte of Palermo. After his death in 1374, the lordship passed to Manfredi III Chiaramonte and upon his death in 1391, to his daughter Eleonora. Following Andrea Chiaramonte's rebellion against King Martin I of Sicily, the Chiaramontes lost all their property.

Niccolò Peralta, husband of Elisabetta Chiaramonte, together with his father Guglielmo rebelled against the king because of his failure to recognize his father-in-law's inheritance, and occupied several centers, including Bivona, which he returned only in 1397. Bivona was later claimed by both Niccolò Peraltra and Pietro Moncada, and pending judgment the captaincy and castellania were briefly entrusted to Bernardo de Carretto of Catania. In April 1397 Pietro Moncada became lord of Bivona, due to the spontaneous renunciation of Niccolò Peralta. After the rebellion of Guglielmo Raimondo Moncada, the property of the Moncada family was confiscated, and in December Bivona was granted to Niccolò Peralta.

When Niccolò Peralta died in 1398, he inherited the Bivona fiefdom from his second daughter, Margherita Peralta, who married Artale de Luna (brother of Maria de Luna, queen of Aragon and mother of the king). The latter, who distinguished himself in the repression of rebels in 1408 in Sardinia and 1420 in Corsica, died in 1421. A few years later, his widow, Margherita Peralta remarried Antonio Cardona. Bivona was given to their son Giovanni, who, however, at the age of fourteen returned it to his mother. Heir to the county of Caltabellotta and the barony of Bivona was Antonio de Luna, the eldest son fathered by Margherita Peralta with Artale, who in 1453 received the investiture of the barony of Bivona and other feudal property.

=== Jewish Community of Bivona ===
In the 15th century there was a Jewish community in Bivona. The community grew demographically and was related to the Jewish community in Palermo.

Other documents from the period that refer to it are a document from 1472, which deals with the exchange of the Barony of Bivona with that of Sambuca by Carlo de Luna with his brother Sigismondo, and a document from 1489, by which Viceroy Fernando de Acuña invited the procurators of each Sicilian Jewry to a General Council. With the 1472 document there is confirmation of the presence of 70 families (equal, roughly, to 300–350 people), or 7 percent of the Bivonese population. The demographic increase of the Bivonese Jewry was also due to its relations with the Jewish community of Palermo: numerous Jews from Palermo operated in the territory of Bivona, and some even moved to the town of Agrigento. In 1474 the lord of Bivona, Sigismondo de Luna, was appointed Secret Master of the Kingdom, that is, protector of the Jews.

Like the other Jewish communities in Sicily, the Jews of Bivona were subject to the expulsion decree of Ferdinand II of Aragon and Isabella of Castile in 1492.

The Jews occupied a fairly central district of Bivona, namely the one surrounding the church and convent of San Domenico. Most likely in this area stood both the synagogue, the room used for the purification of women, and the local seat where the alamia (the Jewish community of the town) met.

== Modern Age ==
=== The first case of Sciacca ===
A dispute over the return by the Perollo family of the barony of San Bartolomeo to Antonio de Luna rekindled the hatred between the two families: on 6 April 1455, in Sciacca, during the procession of the Holy Thorn, Pietro Perollo, son of Giovanni, seriously wounded Antonio de Luna. The latter, having just recovered, entered Sciacca with a considerable number of vassals and, setting fire to the houses of the Perollo family, killed more than a hundred people. However, all these events are not lacking in inaccuracies: they still turn out to be only partially documented.

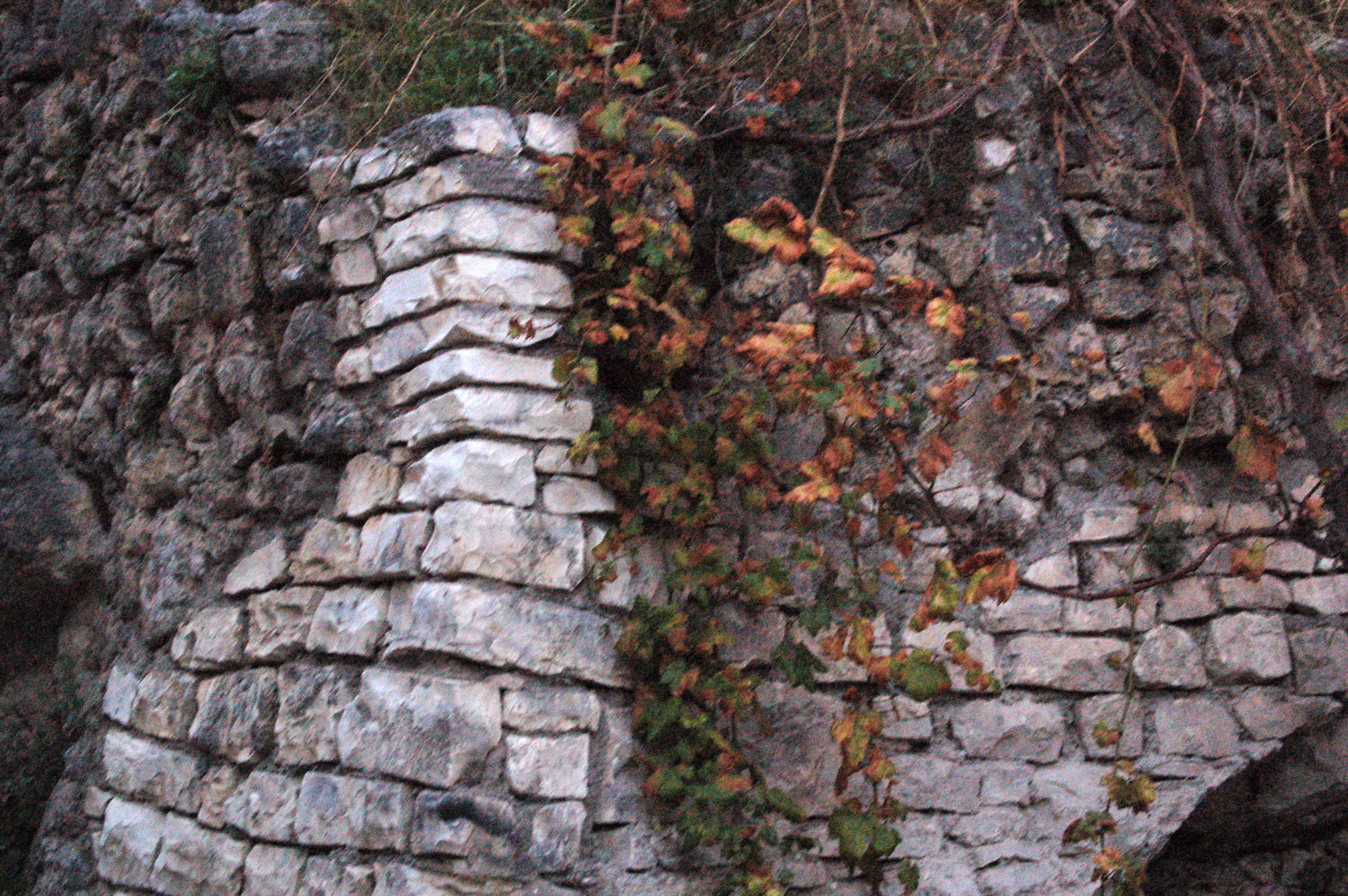
Ruins of the Castle of Bivona

=== The de Luna dynasty ===
After Antonio's death, his son Carlo inherited his property, exchanging with his brother Sigismondo the land and castle of Bivona for the barony of Sambuca. Sigismondo de Luna (he obtained from King John of Aragon the title of Chamberlain, in 1474 he was appointed Secret Master with the right of jurisdiction over all the Jews of Sicily and in 1475 Master Portolan, both prestigious positions in the Kingdom of Sicily), in precarious economic condition, was forced to sell, though subject to buy-back, the land of Bivona to his brother Pietro, who had taken the ecclesiastical habit.

Pietro de Luna was lord of Bivona for a year, then the title passed back to Sigismondo. On 20 October 1480, his son Gian Vincenzo received the investiture, and his uncle Pietro, archbishop of Messina, was entrusted as guardian. He appointed Michele de la Farina as procurator of the barony of Bivona.

Gian Vincenzo, after long disputes with the Alliata e Settimo family, his aunt Eleonora de Luna and his cousin Simone Ventimiglia, succeeded in 1511 in obtaining the investiture of the county of Caltabellotta. From 1514 he was stratigotus of Messina and from 1516 to 1517 he was president of the kingdom. In 1520 Charles V gave him lordship over the port of Castellammare del Golfo. Count Luna's economic conditions became critical after the second case of Sciacca, which drove his son Sigismondo (in 1523 he married Florentine Luisa Salviati, niece of Pope Leo X) to suicide.

=== The second case of Sciacca ===
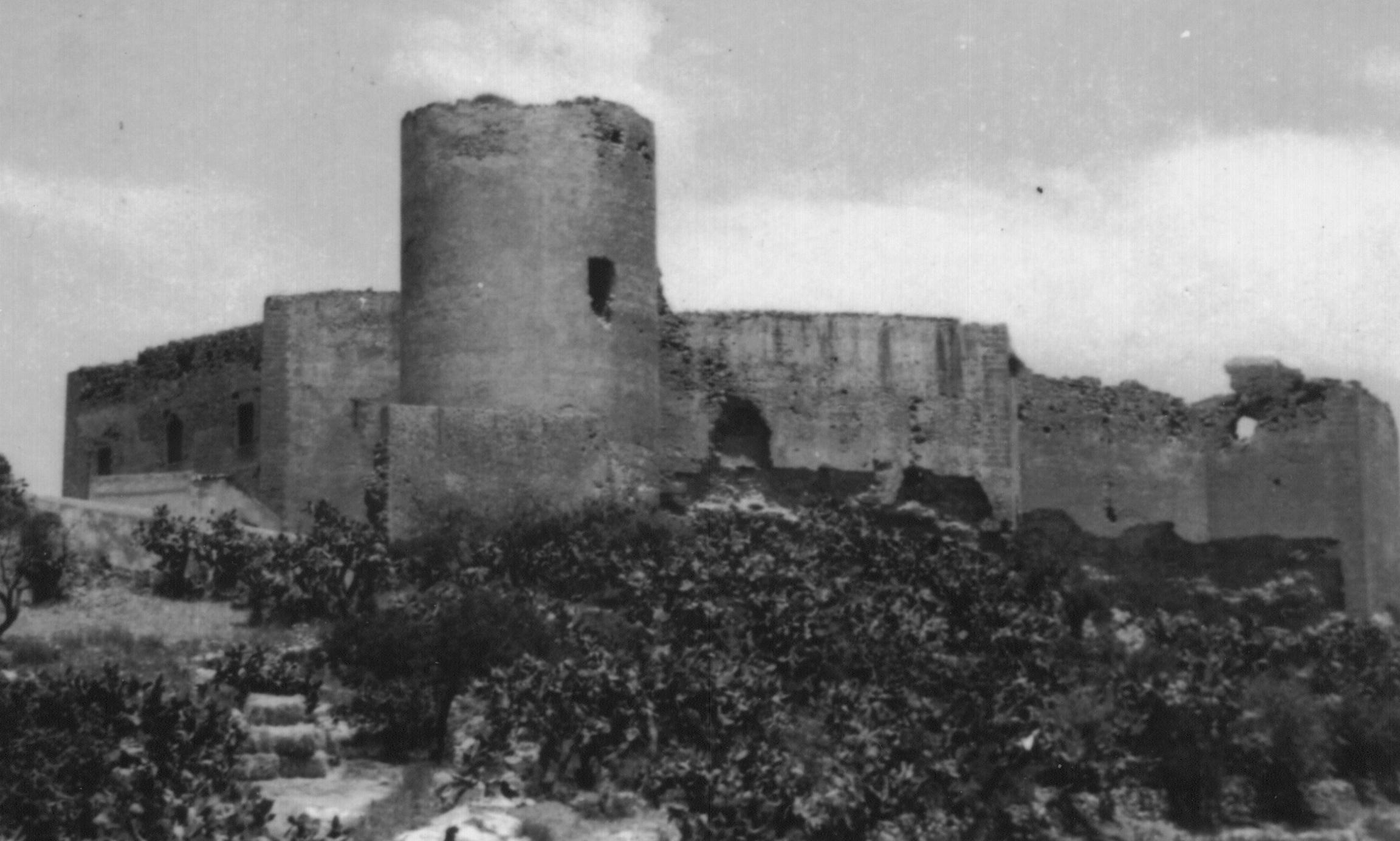
The castle of the De Luna family in Sciacca

In 1520 Gian Vincenzo de Luna went to Rome, to the pope, to form marriage bonds between his son, Sigismondo, and Luisa Salviati, daughter of Jacopo Salviati and Lucrezia de' Medici, daughter of Lorenzo de' Medici, sister of the then pontiff Leo X and half-sister of Cardinal Giulio de' Medici, the future Pope Clement VII. The wedding was celebrated in Rome in 1523. At that time the struggle between the Luna and Perollo families, both among the most powerful families in the Val di Mazara, exploded violently. The first clash between the two factions took place on the road leading from Bivona to Sciacca (the main town where the Perollo exercised power): about thirty soldiers of Count Luna clashed with a host of Perollo's armigers; the soldiers, despite being ambushed by the armigers, managed to reach Sciacca. The number of Count Luna's men grew significantly, and therefore the archpriest of Sciacca Don Gabriele Salvo tried to act as peacemaker between the two families. However, the peace did not last long: following a blow suffered by Sigismondo, the situation worsened considerably. Count Gian Vincenzo de Luna attempted to kill Giacomo Perollo, the Luna's worst enemy, but failed.

On 19 June 1529, Sigismondo smuggled about a hundred armed men into Sciacca: a few days later the death of two of Perollo's armigers revealed the numerous presence of de Luna's men. Giacomo Perollo turned to Viceroy Pignatelli, his friend, who from Messina sent Geronimo Statella (baron of Mongerbino) to Sciacca with a company of foot soldiers. Statella, upon reaching Sciacca, ordered Sigismondo de Luna to disband his troops and move away from the town. On 16 July Statella, passing through Bivona, had Giorgio Grasta hanged with 19 other men, all of them soldiers of Count Luna, in a place near the town: to this day this place is called Cozzu di li furchi. This caused an insurrection of the people of Bivona against Statella, who was forced to return to Sciacca.

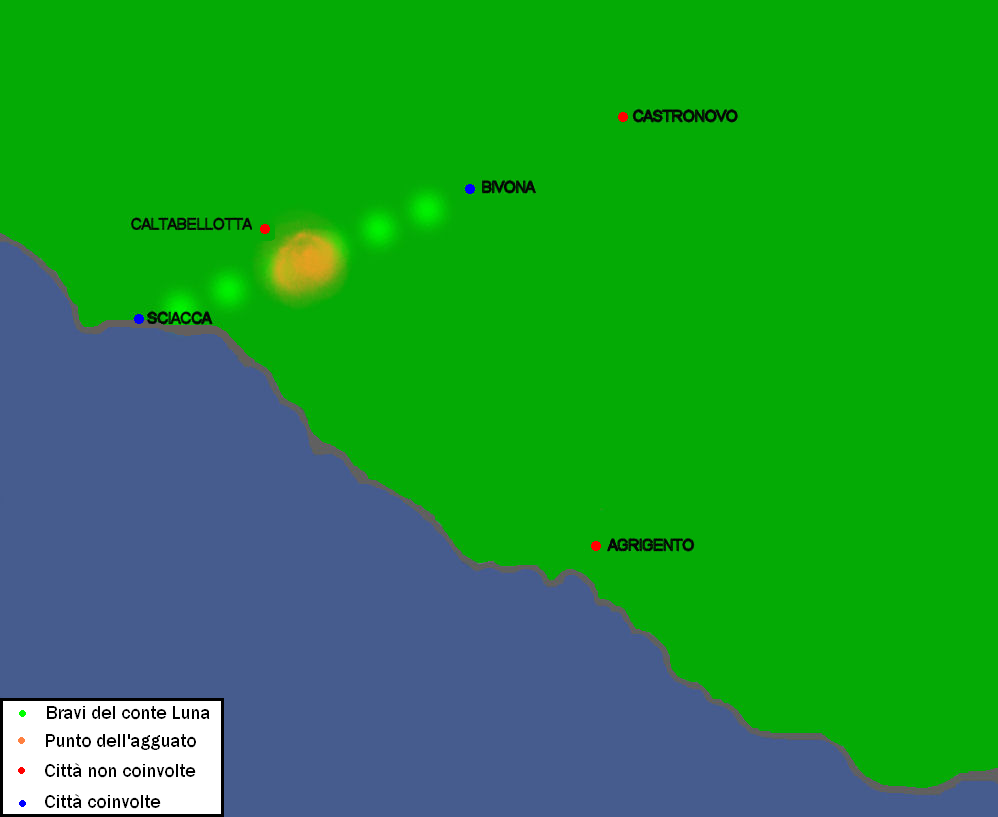
Map of the first clash between the factions

At dusk on 19 July Count Luna entered Sciacca with his men, had the houses of Perollo and Statella surrounded and, at dawn, ordered the attack. Giorgio Comito, leader of a gang hired by Luna, killed Geronimo Statella. On 23 July Count Luna and his men raided the Perollo castle and killed everyone they found. Giacomo Perollo, who had initially managed to escape and hide in a private house, was betrayed: he was killed by Calogero Calandrino. However, Sigismondo, not satisfied with the death of his adversary, committed an act that was not very humane: he tied Perollo's corpse to the tail of a horse and had it carried all over the city. Count Luna, having accomplished his revenge, retreated to Bivona.

Federico Perollo, son of Giacomo, with a contingent of troops entrusted to him by Pignatelli, with some armed men sent to him by the Marquis of Geraci, with the troops of Nicolò Pollastra and Giovanni Riganti (Judges of the Grand Criminal Court), set out for Bivona. However, Sigismondo decided to flee: on 13 August, together with his wife and children, he set sail for Rome. Perollo, having arrived in Bivona and not having found Count Luna, had a veritable raid carried out: many were hanged, some were quartered, and others were driven into exile; some were placed in prisons, and the castle was stripped of its precious furnishings and noble utensils. Bivona was sacked altogether.

In the meantime Sigismondo, sentenced to death and confiscated from his property, arrived in Rome at his uncle Pope Clement VII to obtain a pardon from King Charles V: the pardon was not obtained and Sigismondo, disheartened, committed suicide by jumping into the Tiber. This was in February 1530. In 1547, his father, Gian Vincenzo de Luna, also died in Bivona.

=== The elevation to a duchy (1554) ===
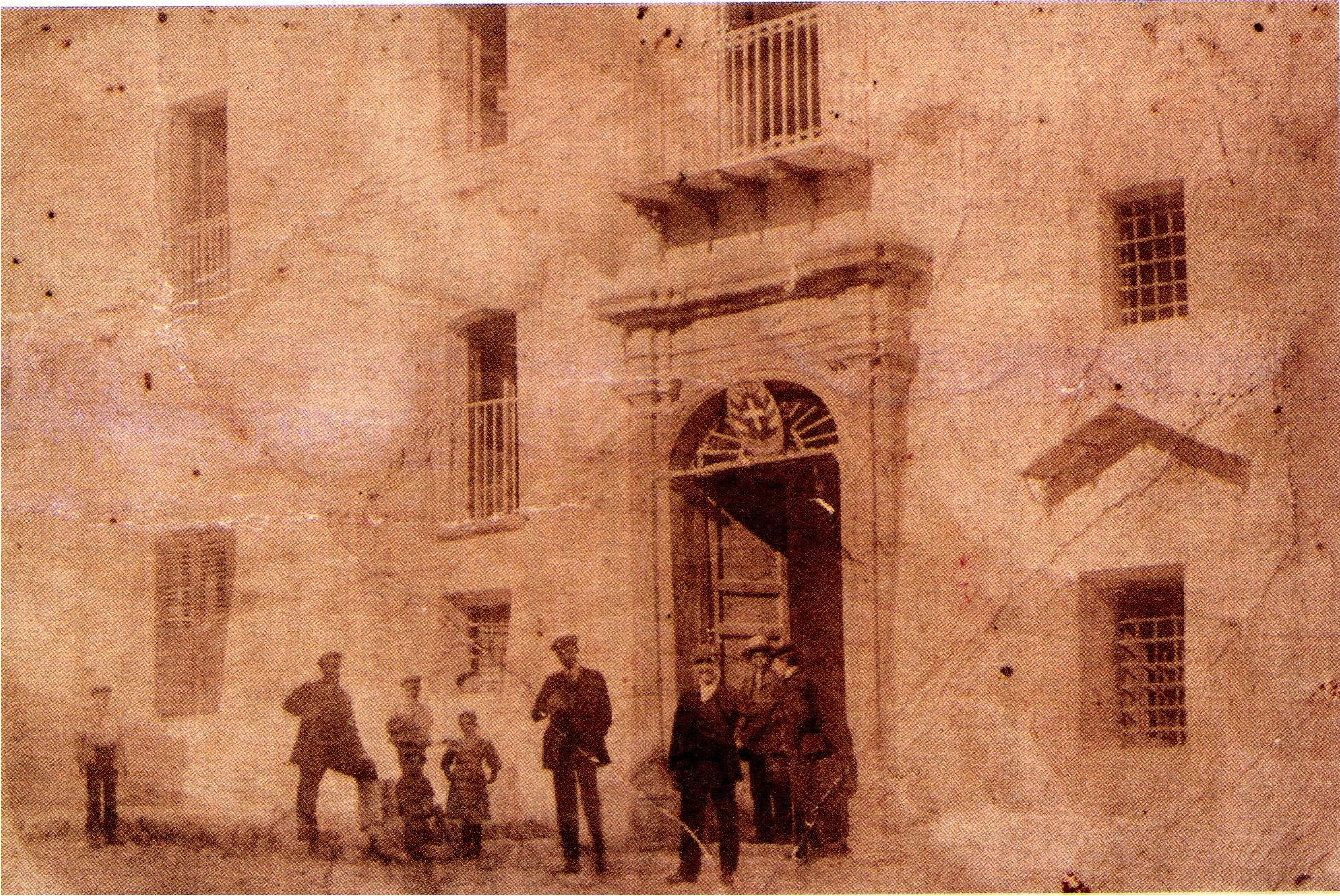
The Ducal Palace of Bivona in an early 20th century photo

Gian Vincenzo's inheritance was collected by his nephew Pietro de Luna (son of Sigismondo), who in 1549 received the investiture of the counties of Caltabellotta and Sclafani, the baronies of Bivona and Caltavuturo, the fief of Misilcassimo, and half of the fief of Cristia; he also became stratigotus of Messina. He regained investiture of a large number of fiefs ceded or alienated by his predecessors, aided by his father-in-law Juan de Vega, viceroy of Sicily: Pietro, in 1552, married Isabella, Juan's daughter, in Messina. The couple, after a period spent in Palermo, moved permanently to Bivona, where the palace that later took the name Ducal Palace had been built. By a privilege of 22 May 1554, enforced in Palermo on 16 June 1554, Charles V elevated the barony of Bivona to the status of a Duchy: the town (one of the most populous in the whole of Sicily and the most populous of those belonging to the Luna family) acquired the right to assume the title of city. Pietro de Luna was the first among Sicilian nobles to acquire the title of Duke (the highest feudal dignity at the time).

In 1553 Jesuit Father Domenech, in a letter addressed to Ignatius of Loyola, described Bivona and its territory, emphasizing its fertility, amenity and moral steadfastness:

Besides this you should know that this land is in the midst of many other lands and cities, which encircle it. Ten, twenty, twenty-five miles, a little more or less, distant from it are Agrigento, Termini, Trapani, Mazara, Giuliana, Prizzi, S. Stefano, and Palermo, which is a day's journey away. And since it is a healthy land and very abundant in wheat, meat and wood, and with regard to customs much better than Palermo and Messina, it is believed that from the surrounding towns many parents will send their children there to study rather than to the two aforementioned cities. It is also rich in fountains and gardens, its climate is healthy, and it enjoys the reputation of being the best among the mountains of this kingdom.

=== The de Luna dynasty (1554–1621) ===
From his marriage to Isabella, Pietro had four children (the firstborn was Aloisia); from his second marriage to Angela La Cerda (daughter of the new viceroy, the Duke of Medinaceli), he had only one son, Giovanni, who was named his universal heir.

Despite his marriage to Belladama Settimo and Valguarnera, Giovanni had no children, and, therefore, on 13 November 1584, he ceded all his states and property to his half-sister Aloisia. On Giovanni's death in 1592, Aloisia de Luna assumed the investiture of the Duchy of Bivona, the Counties of Caltabellotta and Sclafani, the baronies of Caltavuturo and Castellammare del Golfo and numerous other fiefs. Aloisia in 1567 married Cesare Moncada, prince of Paternò; in 1577 she married Antonio Aragona, Duke of Montalto. Aloisia's inheritance, given the untimely death of her son Francesco II Moncada, was achieved by her grandson Antonio d'Aragona Moncada, son of Francesco and grandson of Cesare, in 1620.

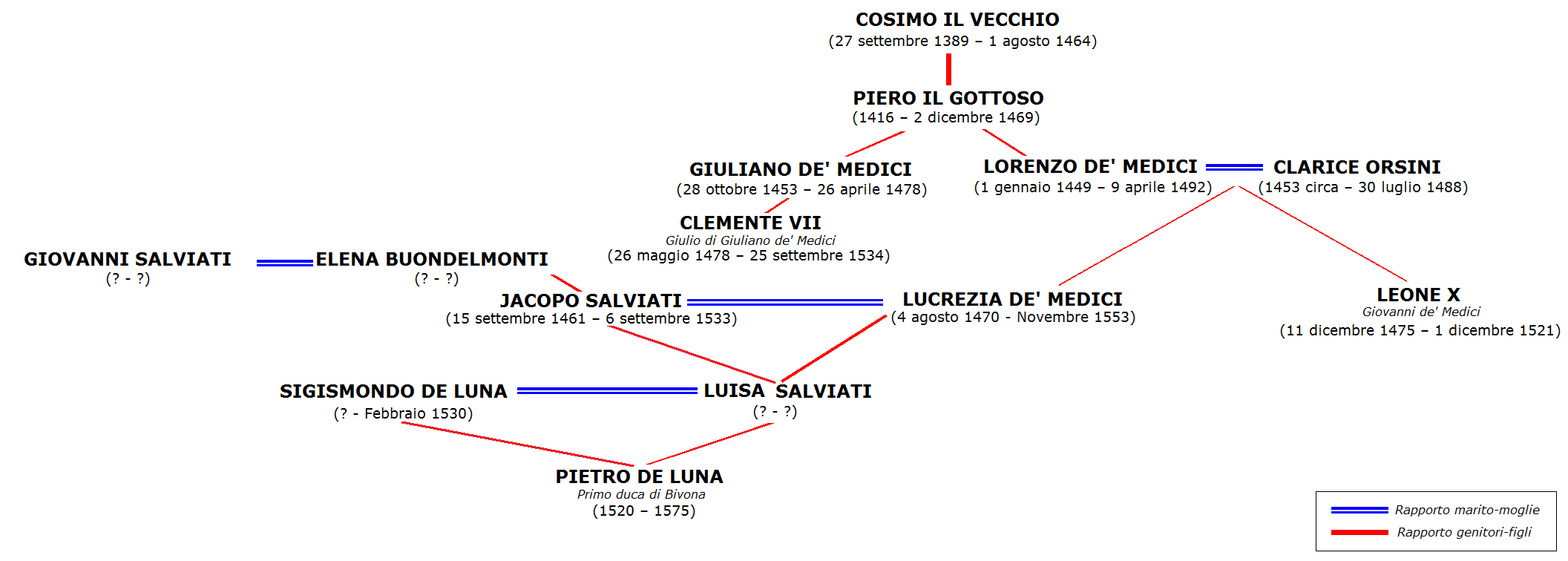
Ancestry of Pietro de Luna

=== The Jesuit college ===
Bivona, a town in the province of Agrigento, was, thanks to this Jesuit College founded by the Duchess de Luna, perhaps the most important cultural center in the province.

— Leonardo Sciascia, Delle cose di Sicilia, 1980

Ignatius of Loyola, founder of the Society of Jesus (1534), had forged very solid relations with the viceroy of Sicily Giovanni De Vega during the latter's stay in Rome as Charles V's ambassador to Pope Paul III.

It was Giovanni de Vega himself, in 1548, who accompanied the ten Jesuits who founded the first Sicilian college in Messina; his wife Eleonora De Osorio, on the other hand, contributed to the foundation of the Jesuit college in Palermo. Their sons, Ferdinando and Assuero, had two colleges founded in the cities they governed (Catania and Syracuse); their daughter, Isabella, asked Ignatius of Loyola directly for the establishment of the Jesuit college in Bivona, the city of which she became duchess in 1554.

Ignatius of Loyola had been chosen by Isabella de Vega as her spiritual director, and with her he undertook a dense and interesting correspondence; therefore, she earnestly begged him to have a Jesuit college established in Bivona as well, saying that it should become, after those of Palermo and Messina, the most important in the Kingdom. The foundation of the Bivona college was prevented by the aversion of Ignatius of Loyola himself to establishing colleges in small towns: this problem was solved through the insistence of the duchess, who in 1553 obtained the assent of the future saint through a letter that Ignatius of Loyola himself sent to Father Geronimo Domenech, provincial of Sicily. In it Ignatius of Loyola wrote:

[...] concerning the college of Bivona everything seems to be well, as long as Your Holiness has people to send there. About the place Your Holiness knows what is convenient, therefore nothing more is to be said [...].

The foundation stone of the Bivona college building was laid on 21 May 1554; in July the foundation stone of the new church was laid in the presence of Pietro de Luna and Ferdinando De Vega, Giovanni's brother. Between 1554 and 1555 it was Father Domenech who kept Ignatius of Loyola informed about the situation of the college being built in Bivona: he, in his letters, expressed very positive opinions about Bivona and its inhabitants. At the end of 1555 Ignatius of Loyola decided to send nine Jesuits to the new Bivona college: they left Palermo on the morning of 1 January 1556. The first rector of the Jesuit college in Bivona was Eleuterio Du Pont, born in Lille in 1527 and a former medical student at the University of Paris.

The Jesuit college in Bivona was the first college in Italy to be founded in a town of few inhabitants (just over 7,000); plans and blueprints of the second Jesuit college in Bivona, built in the 17th century, can be found at the National Library in Paris. The Jesuits in Bivona represented the religious Order that during the Modern Age most influenced the spiritual, cultural and economic life of the town.

=== The Moncadas (1621–1736) ===
Antonio d'Aragona Moncada became Duke of Bivona on 18 November 1621; in 1616 and 1623 he was governor of the Company of Peace, in Palermo. He married Giovanna della Cerda, daughter of the Duke of Medinaceli, and they had seven children (six boys and a girl): in 1627 it was his eldest son, Luigi Guglielmo, who received the investiture of his father's states, since his father, having become a priest, entered the Society of Jesus (and in Palermo he founded the Monastery of the Assumption of the Discalced Carmelite nuns).

Luigi Guglielmo Moncada married in first marriage Maria Afan de Ribera, and in his second marriage Caterina Moncada e di Castro, with whom he had his son Ferdinando. Luigi Guglielmo was a prominent figure: he was President of the Kingdom from 1635 to 1637 (years in which he took steps to strengthen the defenses of the city of Palermo, erecting the Montalto Gate and having Porta Felice and Porta Carini fortified); he was Viceroy of Sardinia in 1647 (a period in which he worked to suppress several revolts, such as those of Masaniello in Naples and D'Alesi in Sicily); was appointed Viceroy of Valencia in 1657; was awarded the Order of the Golden Fleece; was Commander of Belvis della Sierra, thrice Grandee of Spain, General of the Cavalry of the Kingdom of Naples and Major Butler to King Charles; finally, in 1667, having become a widower, he was appointed cardinal by Alexander VII.

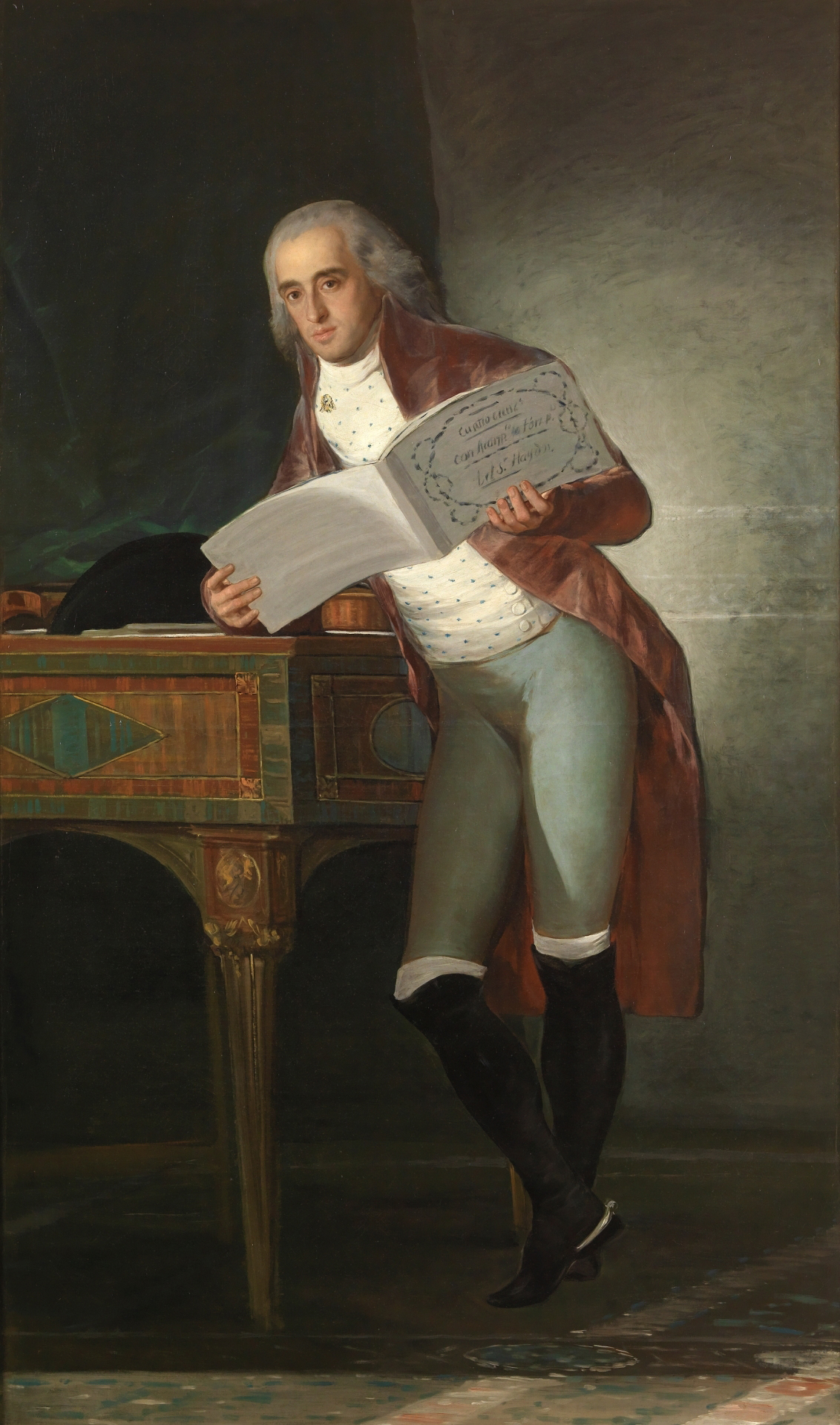
Portrait of the Duke of Alba (José Alvarez de Toledo, Duke of Bivona), Francisco Goya, 1975 (Prado Museum, Madrid)

Despite everything, the economic and financial conditions of the Prince of Paternò were very worrying. When he died, he was succeeded by his son Ferdinando (1673), who married Maria Teresa Faxardo Toledo e Portugal. Their daughter, Caterina, in 1713 (the year of Ferdinando's death) collected her father's inheritance: she was already married to Giuseppe Federico Alvarez de Toledo, Duke of Ferrandina and Marquis of Villafranca.

=== The Alvarez de Toledo (1736–1812) ===
In 1736 Federico Vincenzo Alvarez de Toledo, the son of Giuseppe Federico and Caterina Moncada, became Duke of Bivona; however, the heirs, all very wealthy Spanish feudal lords, never intervened directly in local affairs (the state's attorneys general oversaw the duchy), and so for Bivona the phase of decline began.

After Federico Vincenzo, who died in 1753 in Madrid, the duchy passed to his son, Antonio. His son and universal heir was José Alvarez de Toledo, who had no children by his wife Maria Teresa Cayetana de Silva: when he died (in Seville in 1796), he was succeeded by his brother Francisco. Francisco de Borja Alvarez de Toledo, born and died in Madrid (1763–1821), was the last duke to exercise feudal lordship over Bivona. In 1812, feudal rule was abolished in Sicily.

== Contemporary age ==
The year 1812 came, therefore, to represent for Bivona much more than for many other towns on the island, an effective historical watershed: in fact, it concluded for our town that long and troubled historical cycle that had brought it dignity and well-being, but also disappointment and misery, and opened another one full of hope that instilled in it the confidence to recover the dignity that in the past had made it occupy one of the pre-eminent places among the inhabited centers of Western Sicily.

— Antonino Marrone, Bivona Città feudale, 1987

=== The district of Bivona (1812–1860) ===
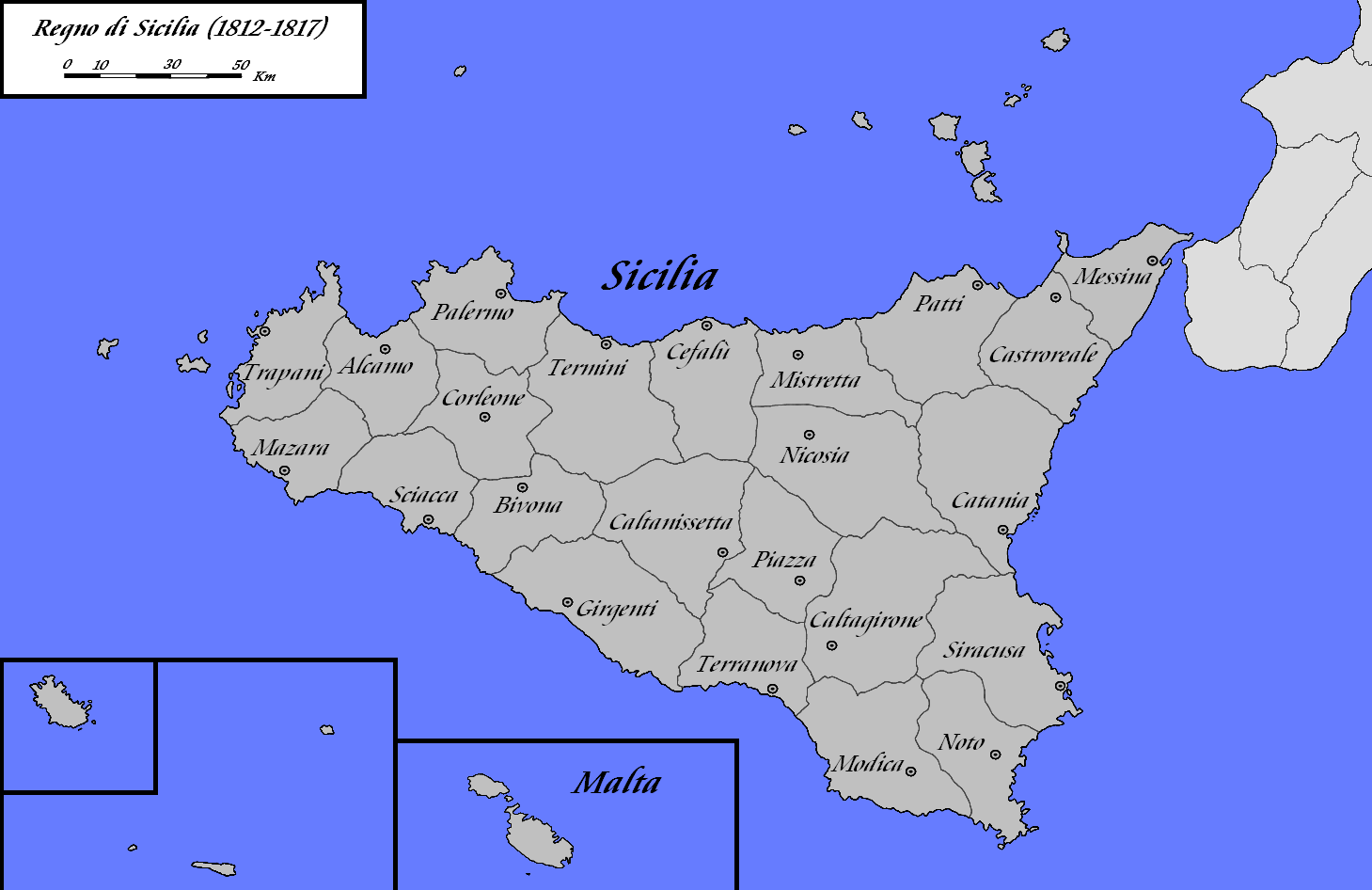
Districts of Sicily

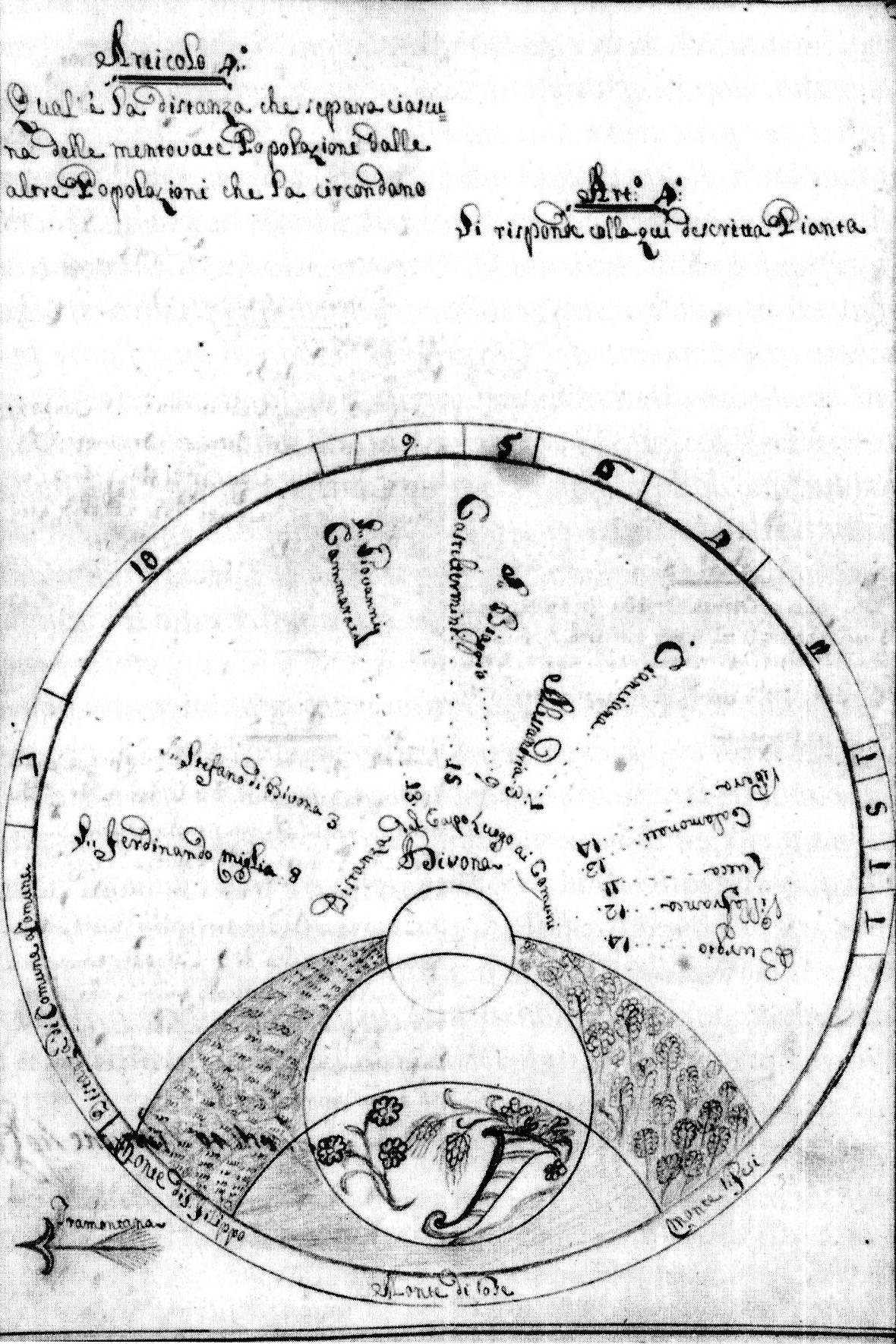
Map of the ancient district of Bivona, with relative distances from other municipalities

From 18 June to 7 November 1812, the Sicilian Parliament, convened by King Ferdinand III of Sicily, held several sessions that sanctioned the abolition of feudal society on the island. The new constitution also made Sicily independent from any other kingdom. The entire Island was divided into 23 districts: each formed an electoral, judicial and financial district. Citizens elected the civic council (whose job was to administer the communes) and representatives to the Chamber of Commons. The council elected the municipal magistrate who exercised the executive power of civic administration. The Sicilian municipalities that benefited most were the feudal centers and those that became district capitals.

Bivona benefited enormously from this new political climate: the town, one of the major feudal centers of Sicily in the 15th and 16th centuries, was designated as the capital of one of these districts; the delimitation of its territory was made taking into consideration the natural, economic and demographic characteristics of the towns involved (the territory was bounded by the Sicani Mountains chain to the north, the Sicilian Channel to the south, and the Platani and Verdura rivers to the east and west).

The district included the following municipalities: Bivona, the hamlet of San Ferdinando (present-day Filaga, then a hamlet of Bivona until it became a hamlet of the municipality of Prizzi in 1859), Santo Stefano di Bivona (present-day Santo Stefano Quisquina), Cammarata, San Giovanni Gemini, Casteltermini, San Biagio Platani, Alessandria della Rocca, Cianciana, Ribera, Calamonaci, Lucca Sicula, Villafranca Sicula, and Burgio.

Bivona countered the claims of Castronovo di Sicilia, which aspired to become the capital of the Bivona district. The reasons for assigning the capital to the city of upper Agrigento were more than valid, so Castronovo was assigned to the district of Termini Imerese. The district of Bivona bordered: to the north the districts of Corleone and Termini, to the east the one of Caltanissetta, to the south the one of Girgenti (Agrigento), and to the west the one of Sciacca.

Bivona was also the seat of a subintendency and subprefecture.

==== The Revolution of 1820 ====
On 6 July 1820, the Carbonari military in Naples succeeded in forcing King Ferdinand to proclaim the Constitution promulgated in Spain in early 1820, which thus also became the Constitution of the Kingdom of the Two Sicilies. The Palermo political class attempted to take advantage of the opportunity to gain Sicily's independence from the Kingdom of Naples.

Numerous demonstrations took place throughout Sicily, many of which caused quite a bit of unrest and turmoil. The first demonstrations were held starting on 14 July in Palermo, and before long they spread throughout the island.

In Bivona the townspeople took to the streets on the evening of 19 July, and many demonstrators occupied the premises of the Subintendency, without causing any public unrest. On 23 July a Provisional Deputation of Security and Public Tranquility and a Provisional District Government Council were formed.

==== The Sicilian Revolution of 1848 ====
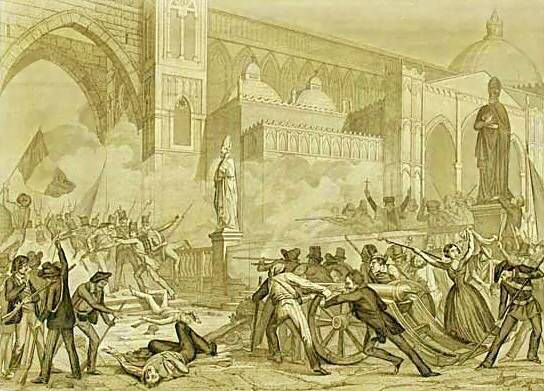
The insurrection of Palermo

Beginning in the last months of 1847, a climate of revolution began to be felt in Sicily, which resulted in the insurrection of Palermo on 12 January 1848: in less than a month the city was liberated from royal troops due to the political-military operations of the General Committee, which wanted to restore the Constitution of 1812 and wanted to annex the Sicilian Nation to the Italian Federation. Committees were formed in numerous municipalities to send their memberships to the city of Palermo.

Also in Bivona on 27 January 1848, the tricolor (symbol of the Revolution) was raised and the Bivona Revolutionary Committee was formed, which covered, in addition, the role of District Committee.

==== The Expedition of the Thousand ====
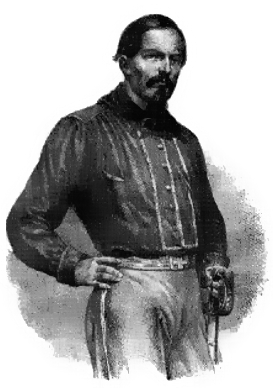
Nino Bixio made a stop in Bivona in July 1860.

On 15 May 1860, news of Giuseppe Garibaldi's landing in Marsala spread in Bivona, and the Bivona liberals, who were in favor of the plan to unify Italy, provoked an insurrection of the people.

Provisional Committees were formed in Bivona and all the municipalities of the district: Calamonaci even sent a squad of volunteers to Garibaldi. The central committee in Girgenti obliged each municipality to organize a squad to send to Palermo. Garibaldi, who on 14 May became dictator of the island in the name of Victor Emmanuel, reorganized Sicily administratively and militarily by issuing several decrees.

The district of Bivona quickly became one of the most disordered and dangerous: it was the only one that did not enjoy the protection of a company of arms, and this favored theft, looting and raids by the numerous armed groups initially formed to join Garibaldi's troops in Palermo. On 12 June the civic council and municipal magistrate, both administrative bodies in favor of Independence and Unity, were established in Bivona.

On 4 July Menotti Garibaldi stopped in Bivona, joined a few days later by the entire column commanded by Nino Bixio, who in the village had a confrontation with the young Baron Onofrio Guggino: Bixio stated in one of his letters:

[in Bivona] patience, that great virtue of the donkey, has been put to the test.

The serious economic situation in Sicily, which had become a battleground between Garibaldi and the Bourbon army, caused the Prodictatorial Government on 17 Oct to issue a decree declaring that the debts of Sicilian municipalities became state debts.

=== The district of Bivona (1860–1927) ===
Historical evolution of the population before 1861
1593	7.315
1628	10.000
1659	4.000
1697	3.600
1722	4.023
1762	3.381
1772	3.417
1802	2.660
1805	2.050
1814	2.565

==== The clash with the Garibaldians ====
In the summer of 1862 various Sicilian centers sent thousands of men who gathered at the Ficuzza base camp, responding to Garibaldi's call for the liberation of Rome: however, the hero of two worlds' plans were hindered by the state of siege proclaimed in Sicily and by Urbano Rattazzi, president of the Council, who feared negative political repercussions both in Italy and abroad.

On 2 August, Garibaldi divided the 3,000 volunteers who had arrived at Ficuzza into three columns and instructed them to gather new adherents in the rest of the island: the three groups followed different routes, and before long the first clashes with the army occurred. The Garibaldian column that traveled along the southernmost stretch of Sicily, commanded by Colonel Giuseppe Bentivegna and consisting of about 1,000 men, left Corleone on 3 August and three days later reached Santo Stefano di Bivona (present-day Santo Stefano Quisquina, a few kilometers from Bivona). The column made a stop in the village, but this was fatal to it: more than sixty armed men were sent from the subprefecture of Bivona, including soldiers and carabinieri, who provoked a firefight with the Garibaldians, who were forced to desist from their attempt to enlist new volunteers.

Garibaldi's men had brought back a few casualties and demanded in vain the return of the rifles that were seized from them; they were forced to leave Santo Stefano, and after passing through Casteltermini, they abandoned their journey in southern Sicily and met with Giuseppe Garibaldi at Santa Caterina Villarmosa. The prefecture of Girgenti justified the incident, frowned upon by the authorities in Palermo, by saying that Bivona had no telegraph office and, for that reason, was unaware of the government's instructions. Journalist and writer Franco Mistrali commented on the incident in these words:

The first blood was shed. Armed citizens fought against themselves. Italians against Italians.

==== Gymnasium in the Savoy period ====
Under the Savoy government, a Gymnasium was established in Bivona by decree of Giuseppe Garibaldi in 1860: however, it was not opened until 9 February 1863. Placido Cerri (1843-1874) (philologist and student of historian Alessandro d'Ancona) also taught there; although he had won a scholarship to perfect his studies abroad, he gave up his research because he was forced to move from Turin to Bivona, where he had been appointed regent of the gymnasium; he recounted the economic-social backwardness of the Sicilian reality in an investigation published in installments in the Florentine newspaper La Nazione and the book Le tribolazioni di un insegnante di ginnasio.

==== The cholera of 1867 ====
At the end of May 1867, Bivona suffered from the cholera epidemic that struck Sicily. The disease caused the death of more than one hundred and fifty people; the town was not officially declared free of the disease until 8 August 1867.

Many people abandoned the city to take refuge in the countryside, causing the country's daily activities to slow down or come to a complete standstill: stores were closed, institutional bodies remained inert, and the dead were left at home. The serious situation was resolved by Francesco Caglià Guettard, secretary of the subprefecture of Bivona: he had a doctor come from Palermo to treat the sick; he had all the stores reopened, with the intervention of the carabinieri; he had the carabinieri and soldiers stationed there bury the corpses scattered around the town; he organized a collection of funds to be donated to the families affected by the disease; he pointed out the bad management and poor performance of the municipal administration and requested that the town of Bivona be entrusted to a commissioner.

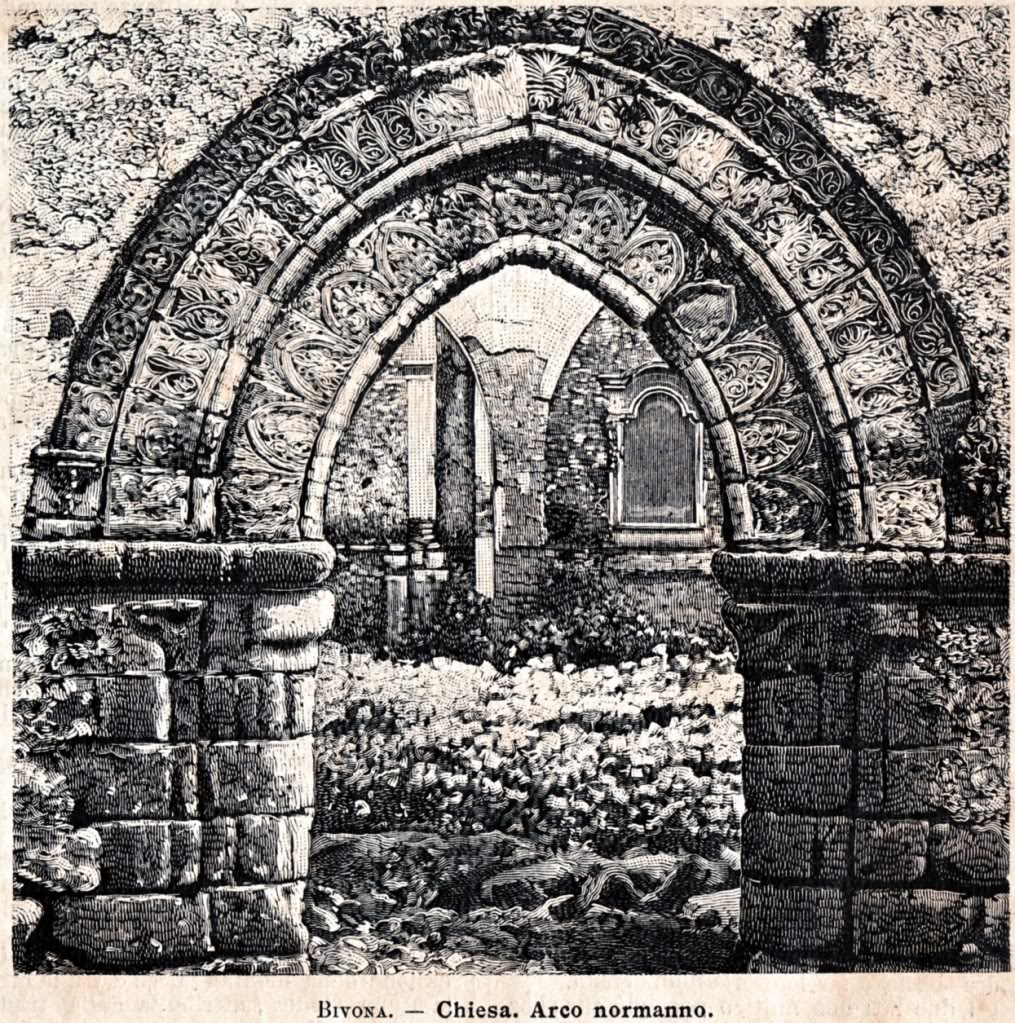
Side portal of the Chiaramontana mother church in Bivona in the early twentieth century

==== The Hundred Cities of Italy ====
In 1892 Bivona appeared, along with Girgenti, in the work Le Cento Città d'Italia (The Hundred Cities of Italy), published by the Milanese newspaper Il Secolo beginning in 1887. The January 1892 issue reproduced photos of some of Agrigento's temples and of the portals (the front one and a side one) of the old Chiaramontana mother church. Bivona, mentioned as the capital city of the district, was thus described:

Still secluded as it is, because of its position among the mountains, from modern movement, Bivona preserves in its main buildings a special medieval imprint. Remarkable, though left in deplorable neglect, are the remnants of an 11th-century church (Norman period) in which we especially admire the elegant and slender pointed arch of the portal.

==== The case of the Duke of Bivona ====
In a social and political climate characterized by the mutilated victory of World War I, the rise of the mafia in Sicily and the crisis of the latifundial economy, the Duke of Bivona Don Eristano (or Tristano) Alvarez de Toledo, a resident of Madrid, became the victim of a kidnapping that took place in Ribera, in the vicinity of Bivona, by some members of a cooperative.

In the summer of 1919, the "Cesare Battisti" cooperative led by pharmacist Liborio Friscia asked the Opera Nazionale Combattenti (ONC) for the lease of the latifundium belonging to the Duke of Bivona, who was also a senator and grandee of Spain.

Arriving in the village in January 1920, Don Eristano, intending to sell his estates to another cooperative, was seized by "Battisti" fighters for three days in his own palace, which had already belonged to his predecessors.

Following his liberation, the Duke of Bivona denounced the violence suffered by the "Bolsheviks" of Ribera, even getting the government of Madrid to intervene, and sold his own latifundium to the rival cooperative of the "Battisti," the one led by Antonino Parlapiano, who in turn leased the latifundium to three cooperatives composed of people belonging to different Mafia gangs.

Ribera is still home to the palace of the Dukes of Bivona, which belonged first to the noble family of the Moncadas, then to the Alvarez de Toledo. The interior is partially frescoed; in one room there is a painting depicting all the heraldic coats of arms of the ancestors of the Alvarez de Toledo family.

=== The Fascist period ===
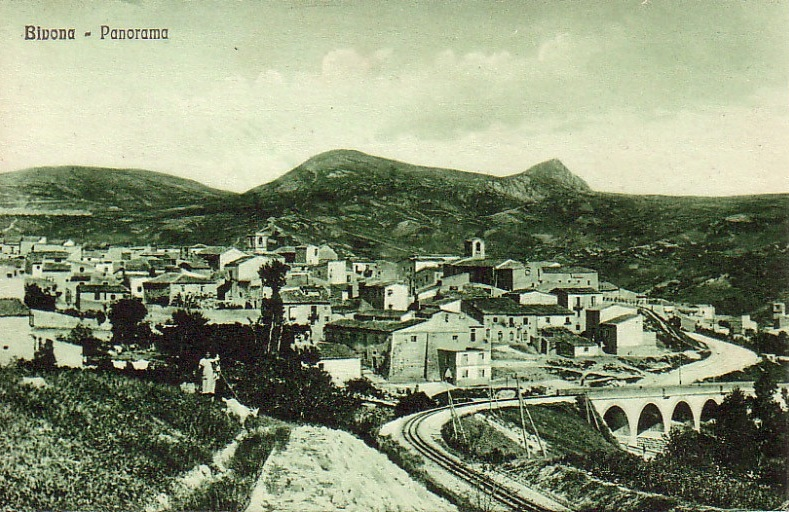
Overview of Bivona from the first half of the 20th century

During the Fascist period, the customs and traditions imposed on society by Benito Mussolini were also introduced in Bivona.

Gymnastics was held in high regard: periodic gymnastic performances were held in the atrium of the former Jesuit College or in Piazza San Giovanni: in a 1942 gymnastic recital held in Agrigento, the Little and Young Italian Girls of Bivona won the silver cup.

Bivona also celebrated the Festa dell'Uva (Grape Festival), cheered by the presence of numerous carts filled with grapes and the town band. Mussolini's policy of demographic development meant that families also became numerous in Bivona: sometimes they were rewarded with a number of medals hung on a tricolor ribbon bearing the inscription "Unione Fascista Famiglie Numerose."

On the occasion of a visit by Benito Mussolini in the late 1930s, the town, which until 1927 remained the seat of a sub-prefecture, was adorned with numerous trees and plants; some squares were renovated and arranged, others renamed; and a municipal villa was built in the town's central square.

In the Fascist period the institute was replaced by a Regio Istituto Tecnico Inferiore (named after Francesco Crispi, a native of the area), in which Latin was also taught.

==== The railway station ====
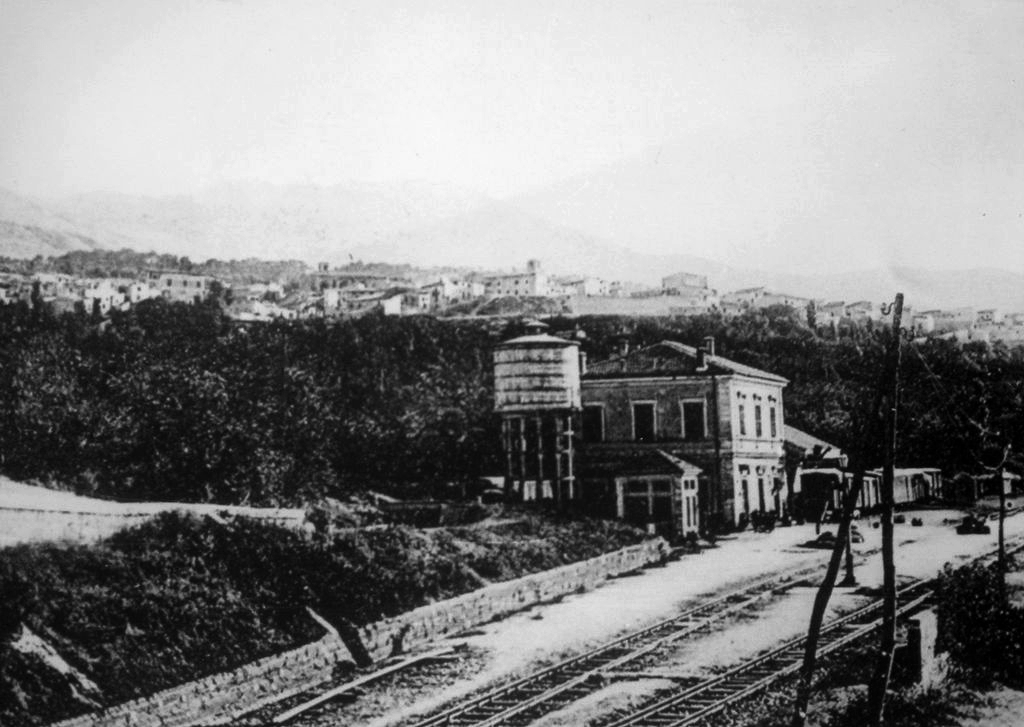
Bivona station in a vintage photo

=== World War II ===
In July 1943, following the American landing in Sicily, several groupings were organized with the aim of stopping the American advance. One of these groupings, called Ricci (mobile group "B"), resisted the enemy advance for many days right near Bivona. On 20 July 1943, the Americans launched the decisive attack, beginning a suffocating artillery fire from the first light of dawn and taking advantage of the aid of numerous violent air attacks. The Ricci grouping, which had already suffered numerous losses, was overwhelmed by the Americans precisely in Bivona. The town was thus reached by the American Third Armored Division, which, after liberating Agrigento, reached Bivona and Cammarata.

Bivona was a place the Anglo-Americans strongly wanted to seize, given its strategic location in the interior of Sicily, a communication route between Palermo and Agrigento.

On 22 July, Allied troops captured the city of Palermo; a few days later, on 5 August, they liberated Catania; on 17 August 1943, they entered Messina and liberated Sicily.

At the end of the conflict, Bivona suffered numerous losses among its inhabitants who fought the war: the names of those who fell in World War II are recorded in the cenotaph dedicated to their memory, which on 25 April each year, on Liberation Day, is adorned with a wreath covered with a tricolor sash.

=== The post-World War II period ===
==== The establishment of the classical high school ====
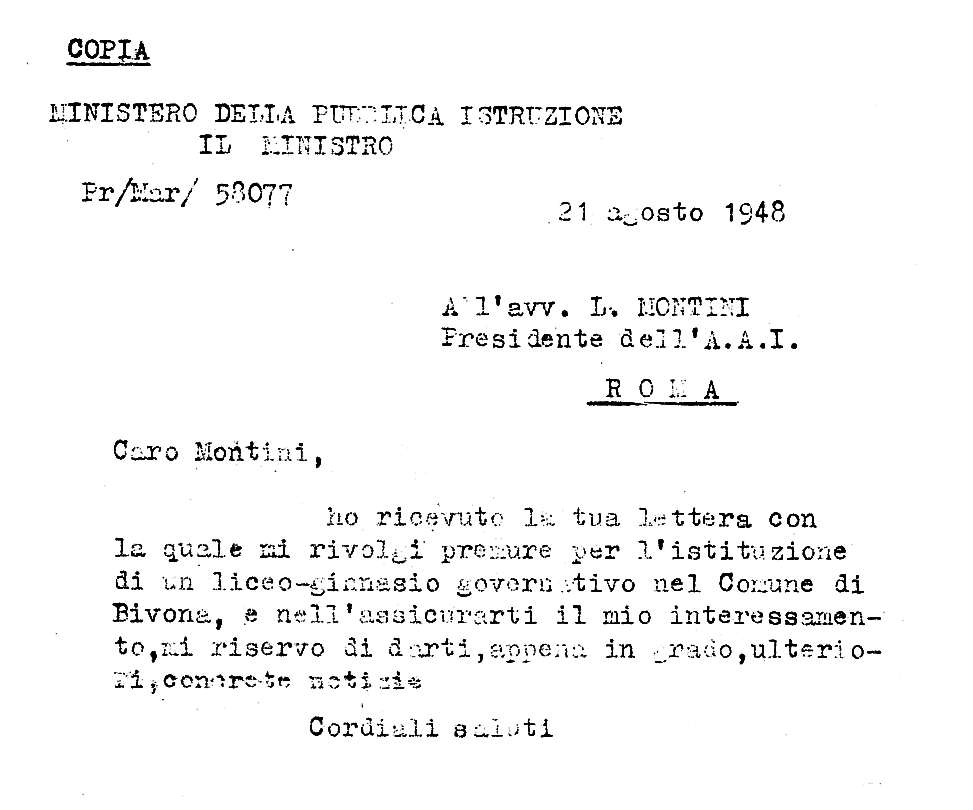
Correspondence between Guido Gonella and Ludovico Montini regarding the establishment of the high school-gymnasium in Bivona

[...] it is incumbent on us to recognize as a privilege to have Bivona host those schools, which certainly produced their cultural effects in the local social environment and created the premises that have allowed [Bivona] to constitute for the area, up to the present day, an appreciated center of study.

— Antonino Marrone, Bivona città feudale, 1987

During the period of World War II, a functioning gymnasium course was established, first as a detached section of the classical high school in Sciacca, then as a section of the classical high school in Agrigento. The classical high school in Bivona was activated in the late 1940s through the collaboration between Bivona lawyer Edmondo Trizzino, Minister of Education Guido Gonella and Brescian lawyer Ludovico Montini, brother of Giovanni Battista Montini, the future Pope Paul VI. Lawyer Trizzino, at the urging of his wife, Baroness Leonarda Guggino, went to Rome to discuss the restoration of classical education in his country, through the establishment of a high school, with lawyer Montini, his friend and colleague when they both practiced in Brescia.

The deputy and future Christian Democrat senator did not hesitate to grant the request and on 27 July 1948, he sent a letter to Guido Gonella, minister of Public Education, urging him to take an interest in the question on the eventual Bivonese high school. On 21 August 1948 Guido Gonella replied to the letter, assuring his interest and reserving the right to provide further concrete news. Thanks to his intervention, a few months later the State High School of Bivona was established, named after Luigi Pirandello; the provisional location was the former Jesuit college, which had been the seat of educational institutions for centuries.

The Bivona high school obtained autonomy with a decree of 18 March 1953; in the 1990s new high school courses were implemented: linguistic, scientific and bio-socio-sanitary, the only one in Sicily. It is the only classical high school in the province of Agrigento dedicated to Luigi Pirandello, who was born in the city of temples.

== See also ==
- Bivona
- Castello di Bivona
- District of Bivona

== Bibliography ==
- Amari, Michele (1843). La guerra del vespro siciliano o Un periodo delle istorie siciliane del secolo XIII (2 ed.). Parigi: Baudry.
- Attanasio, Sandro (1976). Sicilia senza Italia, luglio-agosto 1943. Mursia.
- Di Giovanni, Gaetano (1865). Notizie storiche su Casteltermini e suo territorio. Girgenti.
- Di Salvo, Paolo. Il primo catasto fondiario urbano di Bivona (1838). Bivona: Comune di Bivona.
- Lupo, Salvatore (2004). Storia della mafia. Isola del Liri: Donzelli Editore.
- Marrone, Antonino (1987). Bivona città feudale voll. I-II. Caltanissetta-Roma: Salvatore Sciascia Editore.
- Marrone, Antonino (1997). Storia delle Comunità Religiose e degli edifici sacri di Bivona. Bivona: Comune di Bivona.
- Marrone, Antonino (2000). Ebrei e Giudaismo a Bivona (1428-1547). Bivona: Circolo Leonardo da Vinci - Bivona.
- Marrone, Antonino (2001). Bivona dal 1812 al 1881. Bivona: Comune di Bivona.
- Mistrali, Franco (1862). Da Caprera ad Aspromonte e Varignano. Milano.
- Oliveri, Fabio. Palazzo Adriano: territorio e storia. Palazzo Adriano: Comune di Palazzo Adriano.
- Pace, Biagio (1949). Arte e civiltà della Sicilia antica. IV Barbari e Bizantini. Roma: Editrice Dante Alighieri.
- Puddu, Mario (1965). Guerra in Italia, 1943-1945. Roma.
- Sciascia, Leonardo (1980). Delle cose di Sicilia. Palermo: Sellerio Editore.
- Sedita, Giovan Battista (1909). Cenno storico-politico-etnografico di Bivona. Bivona.
- Sermenghi, Cesare (1981). Mondi minori scomparsi. Palermo: Il Vertice/Libri Editrice.
- Sermenghi, Cesare (1989). Il passato e le sue risposte. Bivona: Biblioteca Comunale.
- Tornatore, Salvatore (2009). Il culto di S. Rosalia a Bivona. La Chiesa e il Fercolo. Bivona: Comune di Bivona.
- Zingali, Gaetano (1962). L'invasione della Sicilia (1943): avvenimenti militari e responsabilità politiche. Crisafulli.
