= Castello di Bivona =

- Part of the walls of Bivona
- Bivona, Sicily, Italy
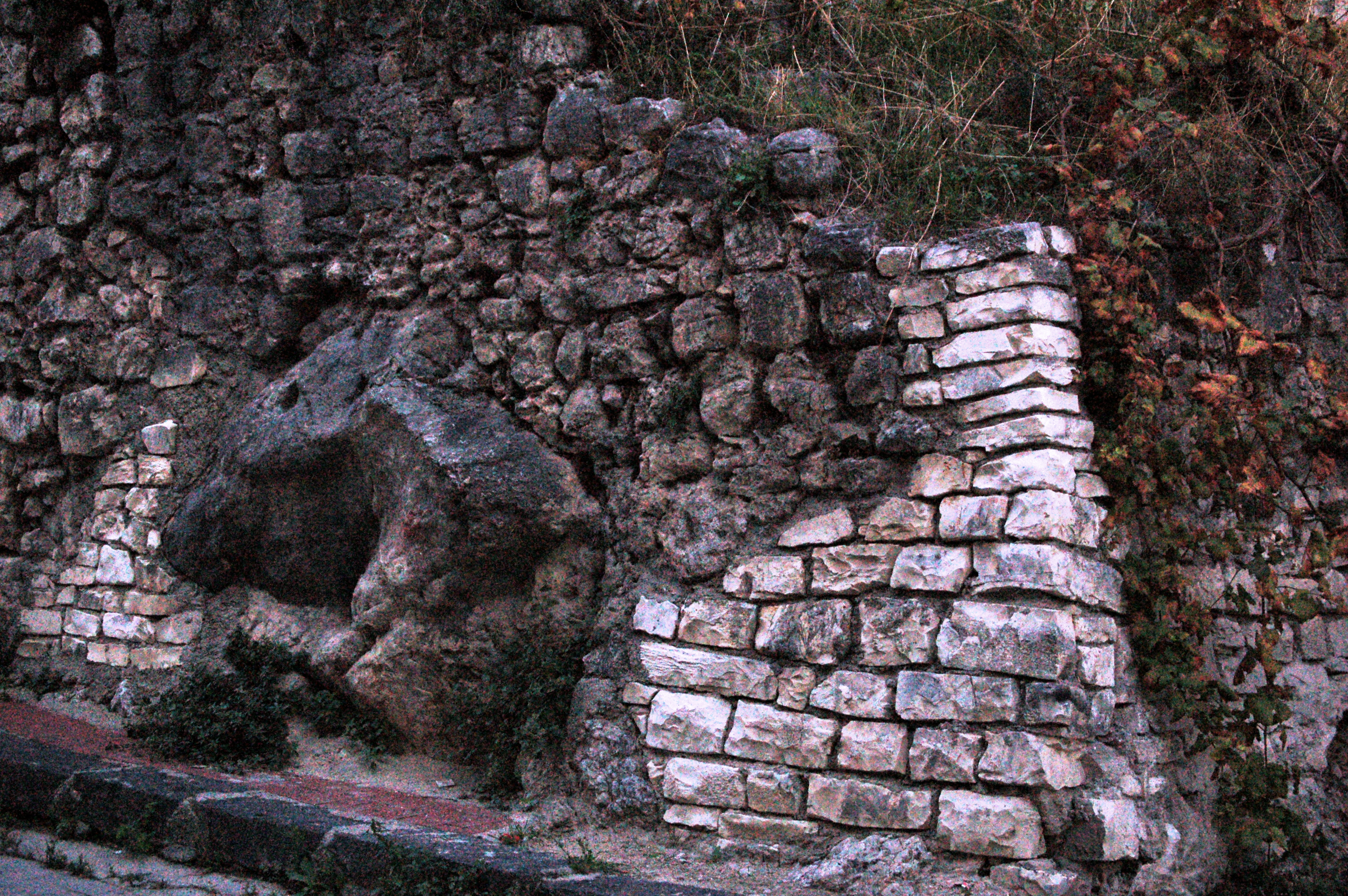
- Ruins of the Castello di Bivona

Site information
- Type: Castle
- Owner: Public
- Open to the public: No
- Condition: Ruins

Location
- Map of the Castello di Bivona
- Coordinates: 37°37′10.4″N 13°26′22.5″E
- Area: c. 1,700 m^{2} (18,000 sq ft)

Site history
- Built: 14th century
- Fate: Partially destroyed, 1529
- Battles/wars: Secondo caso di Sciacca

The Castello di Bivona was a castle in the town of Bivona, Sicily. It was built in the 14th century, and it was partially destroyed when it was sacked in 1529. The castle is now in ruins, and a few remains can still be seen.

== History ==
The first reliable evidence of feudalism in Bivona dates back to 11 October 1299, when Robert of Anjou, the King of Naples, granted the castles of Bivona and Calatamauro to Giacomo de Catania. The castle mentioned in this decree was probably a watchtower which had been built as part of the walls of Bivona around the time of the War of the Sicilian Vespers.

Eventually, the castle began to be built in the first half of the 14th century. In 1359, Guido and Francesco Ventimiglia almost destroyed it, but it was rebuilt within the same year by Corrado Doria. The land and castle of Bivona was passed to Nicholas Peralta in 1397. In 1406, it belonged to Francesco Castellar.

The castle was looted and partially destroyed in 1529, during the Secondo caso di Sciacca, a conflict between the de Luna and Perollo noble families.

Today, the castle is in ruins. Some parts of it are embedded in structures of a later period.

== Layout ==
The layout of the castle has been determined from old maps of Bivona. Its dimensions were as follows, giving it an area of around 1,700 m^{2} (18,000 sq ft):

- North side: 47.5 m (156 ft)
- East side: 35 m (115 ft)
- South side: 27 m (89 ft)
- West side: 44.5 m (146 ft)

A description of the castle is found in the Atti della Città di Palermo of 1892 by Fedele Pollaci Nuccio and Domenico Gnoffo.

== See also ==
- History of Bivona
