= Biagio Pace =

Italian archaeologist and politician

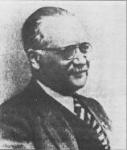
- Born: 13 November 1889; Comiso, Sicily
- Died: 28 September 1955 (aged 65); Comiso, Sicily
- Occupations: Archaeologist, politician

Biagio Pace (Comiso, 13 November 1889 – Comiso, 28 September 1955) was an Italian archaeologist and fascist politician.

== Biography ==
=== Political Activity ===
Teaching archaeology from 1917 at the University of Palermo, in 1922 Pace joined the National Fascist Party, and in 1924 was a candidate in Sicily on the Fascist slate and was elected to the Chamber of Deputies. He was consistently re-elected until 1939, and was President of the Legislative Commission for National Education. From 1939 until 1943, he was a national councillor in the Chamber of Fasces and Corporations.

On 26 December 1946 Pace presided over the founding meeting of the Italian Social Movement and in 1947 was elected to the National Executive Committee of the party.

=== Academic Activity ===
He was Professor of Archaeology and the History of Classical Art at the University of Pisa from 1925 and from 1932 to 1935 Head of the Faculty of Literature at the University of Naples Federico II. From 1926 he was Academic of the Lincei and then Academic of Italy. In the thirties he directed a mission in the Sahara which brought to light the civilization of the Garamantes. To him are owed the discoveries of Camarina and Mozia in Sicily and numerous studies on Byzantine Sicily.

In 1933 he was president of the High Council of Antiquities and Fine Arts. In 1943 he was assigned the "Mussolini Award" for the Moral & Historical Sciences by the Royal Academy of Italy.

== Works ==
- Studi siciliani, Palermo, 1926
- Dalla pianura di Adalia alla valle del Meandro, Milano, Alpes, 1927.
- Arte e civiltà della Sicilia antica, Milano, Dante Alighieri, 1935
- Tembien: Notte di un Legionario della "28 ottobre", Napoli, Ricciardi, 1936.
- L'Impero e la collaborazione internazionale in Africa, Roma, National Institute of Fascist Culture, 1938.
- Introduzione allo studio dell'archeologia, Milano, Mondadori, 1947

== Bibliography ==
- Pietro Giammellaro, "Biagio Pace e la Sicilia antica", in Studi Storici, 53 (2) (2012) pp. 391–420 (cfr. ).
- Pietro Giammellaro, "Il problema della presenza fenicia in Sicilia nella storiografia italiana nazionalista e fascista: Ettore Pais, Emanuele Ciaceri e Biagio Pace", in: Ana Margarida Arruda (Edited by), Fenicíos e Púnicos por terra e mar. Acta do 6º Congresso Internacional de Estudos Fenícios e Púnicos, Centro do Arqueologia da Universidade de Lisboa, Lisbon (ES), 2013, pp. 159-166.
- Pietro Giammellaro, "Biagio Pace, the Whitakers and the first steps of Archaeological investigation in Motya", in "Rivista di Studi Fenici XLVII (2019), pp. 39-52
